= List of nurses =

This is a list of notable nurses in history. To be listed here, the deceased nurse must already have a Wikipedia biography article. For background information, see history of nursing and timeline of nursing history. For nurses in art, film and literature, see list of fictional nurses.

== A-B ==
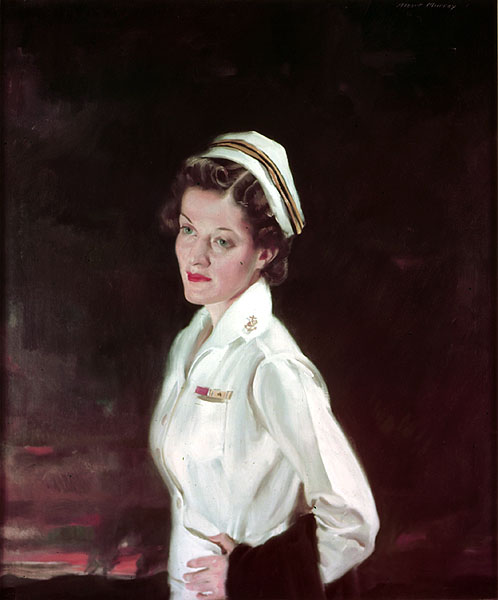
Ann Agnes Bernatitus

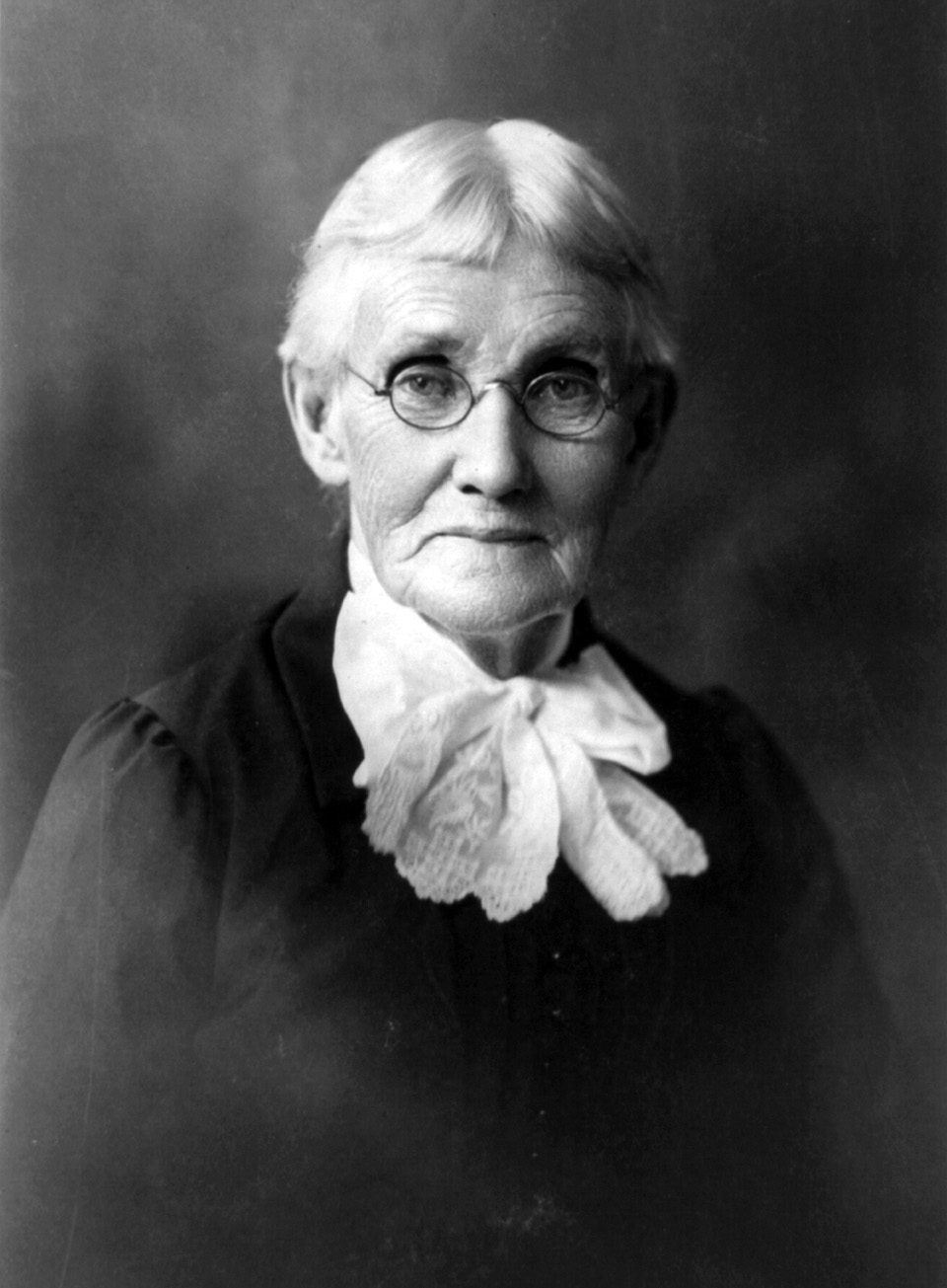
Mary Ann Bickerdyke

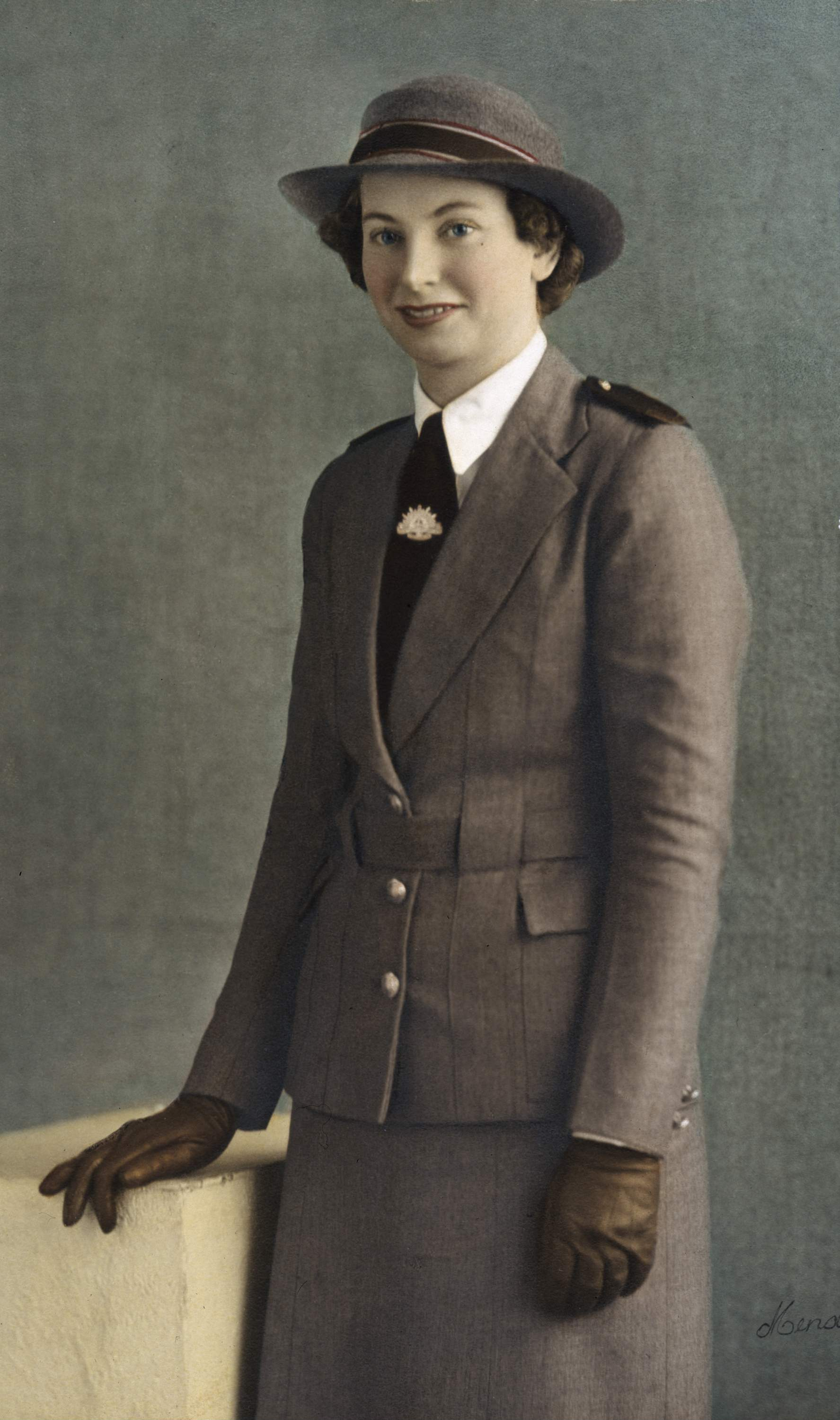
Vivian Bullwinkel

- Lydia Abell ARRC (1872–1959), Australian civilian and military nurse during the First World War
- Judith Adams (1943–2012), Australian nurse, midwife and politician
- Justus A. Akinsanya (1936–2005) Professor of Nursing and Fellow of the Royal College of Nursing
- Saint Alda (died c. 1309), Italian Catholic saint
- Moyra Allen (1921–1996), helped develop the McGill Model of Nursing
- Allen Allensworth (1842–1914), African-American American Civil War soldier who started as a nurse
- Annie Altschul (1919–2001), Britain's mental-health nurse pioneer
- Katherine McCall Anderson (1866–1924), civilian and military matron
- Margaret Irene Anderson (1915–1995), Australian Army nurse
- Pixie Annat (1930–2022), Australian Matron and Queensland Great
- Olive Anstey CBE (1920–1983), Australian nurse
- Charles Atangana (1880–1943), paramount chief of the Ewondo and Bane in Cameroon
- Margaret Auld (1932–2010), Chief Nursing Officer for Scotland 1977–1988
- Martha Ballard (1735–1812), American frontier midwife, great-aunt of Clara Barton
- Anna Baillie RRC (1864–1958), established the first provincial Preliminary Training School for Nurses, and served as a Principal military Matron of Bristol during the First World War
- Anna DeCosta Banks (1869–1930), first head nurse at the Hospital and Training School for Nurses in Charleston, South Carolina
- Doris Bardsley (1895–1968), Australian nurse, president of the Australasian Trained Nurses' Association
- Williamina Barclay (1883–1975), Scottish nurse; one of the main initiators of the evacuation of St Kilda archipelago
- Kathleen Hope Barnes ARRC MBE (1909–1981), Australian nurse
- Ellen Barron (1875–1951) Australian matron
- Nita Barrow (1916–1995), fifth Governor-General of Barbados who started as a nurse midwife and public health educator
- Clara Barton (1821–1912), organized the American Red Cross
- Dora Isabel Baudinet (1883–1945), Australian nurse
- Dame Doris Beale, DBE, RRC and Bar (1889–1971), matron-in-chief of Queen Alexandra's Royal Naval Nursing Service
- Ethel Hope Becher GBE, RRC and Bar (1867–1948), matron in chief of Queen Alexandra's Imperial Nursing Service
- Christine Beasley CBE (born 1944), Chief Nursing Officer for England
- Irene L. Beland (1906–2000), American nursing educator, author of Clinical Nursing: Pathophysiological and Psychosocial Approaches
- Jane Bell OBE (1873–1959), Scotland-born Australian principal matron of the First Australian General Hospital in Egypt in First World War
- Agnes Jessie Bennett (1880–1969), Australian nurse
- Isabel Bennett RRC (1862-1922), civilian matron and during First World War, ran an annexe for injured officers
- Ann A. Bernatitus (1912–2003), one of the Angels of Bataan – USN nurses in the Philippines in World War II
- Claire Bertschinger, Swiss-British nurse who inspired the Band Aid charity movement
- Mary Ann Bickerdyke (1817–1901), nurse during the American Civil War known as "Mother Bickerdyke"
- Louisa Bicknell (1879–1915), Australian civilian and military nurse
- Martha Bidmead RRC (1862–1940), Australian nurse
- Dame Emily Mathieson Blair DBE, RRC (1890–1963), British military nurse and nursing administrator
- Florence Blake (1907–1983), American pediatric nursing professor and author
- Florence A. Blanchfield (1884–1971), superintendent of the United States Army Nurse Corps
- Isla Blomfield (1865-1959), Australian nurse
- Cecilia Blomqvist (1845–1890), Finnish deaconess
- Kath Bonnin (1911–1985), Australian army nurse during World War II
- Doris Booth (1895–1970), Australian nursing volunteer
- Angela Boškin (1885–1977), first professionally trained Slovenian nurse and social worker in Yugoslavia
- Hilda Bowen (1923–2002), credited with establishing the modern nursing profession in The Bahamas
- Peggy Boyd (1905–1999), one of Scotland's first air-ambulance nurses; served during World War II
- Jo Brand (born 1957), British nurse-turned-comedian
- Elsa Brändström (1888–1948), Swedish World War I Red Cross nurse in Siberia
- Sister Philippa Brazill (1895–1988), Sister of Mercy, Australian nurse and hospital administrator
- Mary Carson Breckinridge (1881–1965), founder of the Frontier Nursing Service
- Daisy Bridges CBE (1894–1972), British nurse and midwife, known for being International Council of Nurses General Secretary
- Louisa Briggs (1836–1925), Australian nurse and, aboriginal leader and activist
- Mary Francis Bridgeman (1813–1888), nun and Crimean War nurse
- Ellen Johanne Broe (1900–1994), Danish nurse and nursing educator
- Anna Broms (1862–1890), first professionally trained nurse in Finland
- Sidney Browne (1850–1941), first matron-in-chief of the Queen Alexandra's Imperial Military Nursing Service and first president of the Royal College of Nursing
- Viola Davis Brown (1936–2017), first African-American to lead a state office of public health nursing in the United States
- Abraão José Bueno (born 1977), Brazilian nurse and serial killer
- Carrie E. Bullock (1887–1962), African-American nurse
- Vivian Bullwinkel (1915–2000), lone survivor of the Banka Island Massacre, celebrated by the Australian Service Nurses Memorial
- Beryl Burbridge OBE (1902–1988), Australian military matron
- Elizabeth Burchill (1904–2003), Australian nurse, philanthropist and author
- Mercia Butler (1933–1990), indigenous Australian nurse and nun

== C-D ==
- Betsi Cadwaladr (1789–1860), Welsh nurse who worked alongside Florence Nightingale in the Crimea
- Amanda Cajander, (1827–1871), pioneer in the education of deaconesses and nursing in Finland
- Maude E. Callen (1898–1990), American nurse-midwife
- John Campbell, British nurse, nursing educator, and YouTuber
- Sadie Canning MBE (1930–2008), Western Australia's first Aboriginal trained nurse and hospital matron
- Vice Admiral Richard Carmona (born 1949), American registered nurse, later Surgeon General of the United States
- Kate Carruthers (1887–1969) Scottish nurse, joined the Territorial Force Nursing Service
- Alice Cashin RRC and Bar (1870–1939), Australian World War I military nurse
- Harriett Cassells FRCN (1926–2017), Northern Ireland nurse, known for her work in fever nursing and infection control
- Mabel Helen Cave RRC (1863–1953), matron of the Westminster Hospital and war-time nursing leader and member of the Army Nursing Board
- Edith Cavell (1865–1915), British nurse, World War I
- Dorothy Cawood MM (1884–1962), Australian civilian and military nurse
- Maria Cederschiöld (1815–1892), pioneer in the education of deaconesses and nursing in Sweden
- Justina Charles, Dominican politician
- Patricia Downes Chomley (1910–2002), Australian nurse and college director
- Ellen Christensen (1913–1998), Danish nurse and resistance fighter
- Luther Christman (1915–2011), first male dean of a U.S. nursing program; established the Rush model of nursing
- Dame June Clark (1941–2025), professor at the University of Swansea, president of the Royal College of Nursing 1990–1994
- Letitia Clark, MBE, RRC (1870–1939), matron, nursing leader and founding member of the precursor to the College of Nursing
- Margaret Turner Clarke (1836–1887), Australian nurse
- Trevor Clay (1936–1994), general secretary of the Royal College of Nursing 1982–1989
- Jessie Clifton (1876–1959), Australian nurse, became matron in charge of the Western Australian Nursing Transport system in World War I
- Rosabella Paulina Fynes Clinton (1853–1918), nurse, and founding member of masseuse institute, and council member of Royal College of Midwives
- Frances Cluett (1883–1969), Newfoundland army nurse and educator
- Sheila Collins (1921–2009), Royal College of Nursing's chair of council
- Louise Conring (1824–1891), first professionally trained nurse in Denmark, head of Copenhagen's Deaconess Institute
- Evelyn Conyers CBE, RRC & Bar (1870–1944), New Zealand–born Australian matron-in-chief during World War I
- Dorothy S Coode (1873–1967), British nurse, president of the Royal College of Nursing
- Margaret Cooper (1922–2013), British nurse tutor
- Pearl Corkhill MM (1887–1985), decorated Australian military nurse of the First World War
- Cubah Cornwallis (died 1848), Jamaican nurse and "doctoress" who treated Nelson and William IV when they were stationed in the West Indies
- Rachael Cox-Davies (1862–1944) CBE, RRC Bar, British nurse, matron, Royal Free Hospital and co-founder of the Royal College of Nursing
- Rose Creal RRC (1865–1921), decorated Australian military nurse of the First World War
- Joanna Cruickshank DBE, RRC (1875–1958), British nurse, founder and matron-in-chief of Princess Mary's Royal Air Force Nursing Service
- Emily Margaret Cummins RRC (1866–1934), nursing leader and arranged first nurses day service in 1924
- Lilian Ellen Cushon RRC & Bar (1873–1967), British nursing leader; during World War I, principal matron of the British Red Cross Hospital at Netley
- Beatrice Cutler (1861–1942), pioneering matron and founding secretary of the National Council of Nurses of the United Kingdom
- Lady Ursula d'Abo (1916–2017), British wartime nurse with the Voluntary Aid Detachment
- Andrea Dalzell, American nurse, first wheelchair-using registered nurse in the state of New York
- Harriet Patience Dame (1815–1900), nurse during the American Civil War, served with the 2nd New Hampshire Volunteer Infantry
- Grace Ebun Delano (born 1935), Nigerian nurse and midwife, pioneer of reproductive health services in Nigeria
- Jane Delano (1862–1919), founder of the American Red Cross Nursing Service
- Sylvia Denton (1941–2020), president of the Royal College of Nursing 2002–2006
- Maria de Villegas de Saint-Pierre (1870–1941), founded the Saint-Camille Nursing School and directed the Élisabeth Hospital in Poperinge during World War I
- Edith DeVoe (1921–2000), first African-American nurse to serve in the regular Navy, World War II and Korean War nurse
- Marion Dewar (1928–2008), Canadian nurse, mayor of Ottawa and a member of the Parliament
- Helen Dey (1886–1968) CBE, RRC British nurse, Matron of St Bartholomew's Hospital
- Louise Dietrich (1878–1962), American nurse in Texas and suffragist
- Dorothea Dix (1802–1887), superintendent of Army Nurses during the American Civil War
- Elizabeth Dodds RRC (1872–1944), nursing leader and matron of Bethnal Green Infirmary and Military Hospital
- Josephine Dolan (1913–2004), nursing historian and educator at the University of Connecticut
- Mary Donaldson, Baroness Donaldson of Lymington (1921–2003), Lord Mayor of London
- Sister Dora (1832–1878), British nurse
- Ellen Dougherty (1844–1919), first professionally trained registered nurse in New Zealand
- Rosalie Dreyer (1895–1987), Swiss-born, naturalized British nurse, known as matron-in-charge of the Nursing Service of the London County Council
- Lucy Lincoln Drown (1848–1934), American nursing educator
- Lois Dunbar (fl. 1861–1864), American Civil War nurse
- Anka Đurović (1850–1925), Serbian nurse in the first Serbian-Turkish War, the Bulgarian-Serbian War, the First Balkan War, the Second Balkan War, and World War I

== E-F ==
- Sarah Emma Edmundson (1841–1898), Canadian-American writer; served with the Union Army in the American Civil War
- Alice Gordon Elliott OBE (1886–1977), Australian nurse and community worker
- Victoria Joyce Ely (1889–1979), Florida's first licensed midwife; conducted training programs for midwives in the state
- Queen Fabiola of Belgium (1928–2014), worked as a floor nurse in Spain before being crowned queen of Belgium
- Saint Fabiola (died 399), Catholic saint; cared for the sick and poor
- Claire Fagin (1926–2024), American nurse, educator, and academic
- Helen Fairchild (1885–1918), American nurse World War I
- Florence Farmborough (1887–1978), British nurse; kept diaries of her service during World War I as a Red Cross nurse with the Imperial Russian Army
- Ainna Fawcett-Henesy, FRCN (born 1946), Irish nurse; former regional adviser on nursing and midwifery for Europe for the World Health Organization
- Barbara Fawkes (1914–2002), chief education officer, General Nursing Council 1959–1974
- Ethel Gordon Fenwick (1856–1947), British nurse; led the campaign for the State Registration of Nursing in Britain
- Erna Flegel (1911–2006), Adolf Hitler's nurse
- Alma E. Foerster (1885–1967), American nurse; served in World War I, received the Florence Nightingale Medal (1920) and then worked in the United States Public Health Service
- Edna Lois Foley (1878–1943), American nurse
- Elizabeth Warham Forster (1886–1972), American nurse; served the Navajo Nation and advocated for their retention of traditional medicine practices
- Dame Elizabeth Fradd (1949–2024), assistant chief nurse in the U.K. Department of Health
- Edith de Magalhães Fraenkel (1889–1969), Brazilian nurse
- Isabella Fraser (1857–1932), Scottish nurse; worked as the matron of Dunedin Hospital, New Zealand
- Phyllis Friend (1922–2013), chief nursing officer, U.K. Department of Health and Social Security 1969–1982
- Michiko Fujiwara (1900–1983), Japanese nurse; later became a politician

== G-H ==
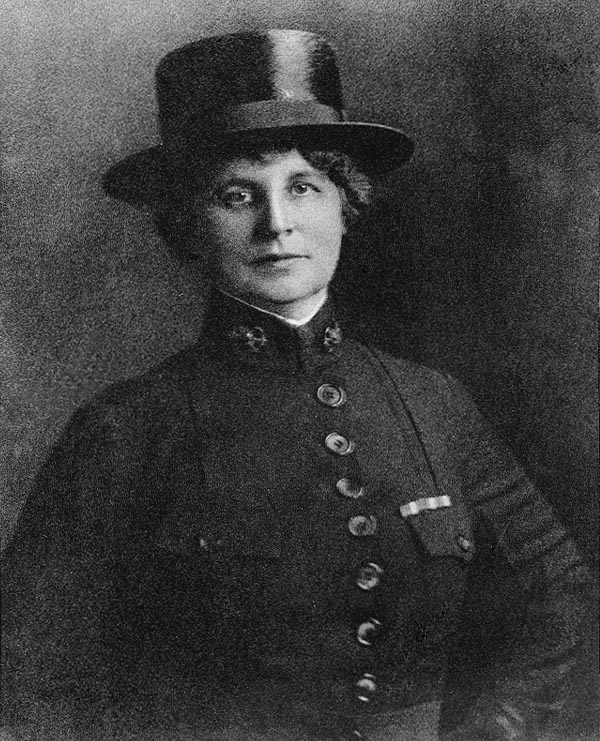
Lenah Higbee

- Genevieve de Galard (1925–2024), French nurse during the First Indochina War (also known as the French Indochina War)
- Marjorie Grace Gardener OBE, FRCN (1918–1999), nurse, educationalist and administrator
- Ann Garriock (1857–1929), military nursing leader and principal matron in the Queen Alexandra's Imperial Military Nursing Service
- Nelly Garzón Alarcón (1932–2019), Colombian nurse, teacher; first Latin American nurse to be president of the International Council of Nurses
- Eliza George (1808–1865), American Civil War nurse
- Catherine Alicia Georges (born 1944), America nurse, professor, and nonprofit executive
- Abigail Hopper Gibbons (1801–1893), abolitionist activist during the American Civil War
- Annie Warren Gill (1862–1930), president of the College of Nursing in 1927; matron, Royal Infirmary of Edinburgh
- Brigadier Dame Helen Shiels Gillespie, DBE, RRC, QHNS (1898–1974), British military nurse, matron and nursing administrator.
- Helen L. Gilson (1836–1868), American Civil War nurse
- Haydee Gómez Cascante (1926–2024), Costa Rican obstetrician nurse and educator
- Nicolle Gonzales (born 1980), Native American certified nurse midwife and founder of the Changing Woman Initiative
- Stella Goostray (1886–1969), American nurse, author and educator
- Marjory Gordon (1931-2015), nursing theorist and professor who created a nursing assessment theory known as Gordon's functional health patterns
- Dorothy Granada (born 1930), American nurse, humanitarian, and peace and social justice activist who founded a women's healthcare clinic in Mulukukú, Nicaragua, and was awarded the International Pfeffer Peace Award in 1997
- Edith Greaves (1879–1967) Nurse and Midwife; midwifery leader and Matron of City of London Maternity Hospital
- Margaret Dorothy Green (1929–2017), instrumental in setting up the UKCC the forerunner of the Nursing and Midwifery Council
- John Greene (1916–2001), first male president of the Association of Nurse Administrators 1976–1979
- Elinor D. Gregg (1889–1970), American public nurse
- Mona Grey (1910–2009), Northern Ireland's first Chief Nursing Officer
- Cathinka Guldberg (1840–1919), first professionally trained nurse in Norway
- Georgina Haines (1867–1959), wartime military nursing leader, also known for nursing King Edward VII during and after an emergency operation
- Millie E. Hale (1881-1930). in 1916, founded Millie E. Hale Hospital with her husband, John Henry Hale, M.D., in Nashville, Tennessee, the first year-round hospital for African Americans in the city
- Dame Catherine Hall (nurse) (1922–1996), general secretary, Royal College of Nursing (1957–1982)
- Cornelia Hancock (1839–1926), American Civil War nurse
- Madelon Battle Hancock (1881–1930), American nurse who was decorated with the Order of the Crown, the Croix de guerre, and the British War Medal and ennobled by Albert I of Belgium for her medical services during World War I
- Carrie Hall (1874–1963), World War I American Red Cross nurse and nurse educator
- Helen Hanks ARRC (1886–1949), British matron at St. George's Hospital
- Wilby Hart (1881–1967), stone mason and sculptor, and nurse to royalty
- Jean Evelyn Headberry (1911–1993), Australian registered nurse and midwife and recipient of the Florence Nightingale Medal
- Winifred Hector (1909–2002), British pioneering reformer of nurse education
- Eliza Parks Hegan (1861–1917), Canadian nurse
- Bodil Hellfach (1856–1941), Danish nurse, deputy head of the Danish Nurses' Organization
- Virginia Henderson (1897–1996), "First Lady of Nursing", American nurse theorist
- Monina Hernandez, first Filipino nurse to be appointed to the Nursing Council of New Zealand and first Filipino elected as director of the New Zealand Nurses Organisation
- Pamela Hibbs (1935–2021), British nurse and pioneer in pressure sore prevention
- Mary A. Hickey (1874–1954), American nurse and health administrator
- Lenah Higbee (1874–1941), pioneering U.S. Navy nurse during World War I
- Elaine Hills-Young MBE (1895–1983), British nurse integral to establishing the Red Cross in the Sudan
- Lisbeth Hockey (1918–2004), Austrian-born British nurse, first director of the Nursing Research Unit in Edinburgh
- Gerda Höjer (1893–1974), recipient of the Florence Nightingale Medal and president of the International Council of Nurses
- Stanley Holder OBE FRCN (1928–2017), British nurse leader, member of the UKCC United Kingdom Central Council for Nursing Midwifery and Health Visiting Board
- Mary Melanie Holliday (1850–1939), American Catholic religious sister and nurse at St. Joseph's Infirmary
- Lydia Holman (1868–1960), American nurse; dedicated her life to promoting rural public health
- Anna Morris Holstein (1825–1900), American Civil War nurse, matron-in-chief, from Gettysburg to Virginia; wrote Three Years in Field Hospitals of the Army of the Potomac
- Flora Hommel (1928–2015), American childbirth educator
- Edith Hudson (born 1872), British nurse and suffragette
- Dame Agnes Hunt (1867–1948), British Orthopaedic Nursing pioneer
- Alberta Hunter (1895–1984), American nurse who became a jazz singer
- Marget Husband (1887–1986), British nurse and matron of Glasgow Royal Infirmary
- Rachela Hutner (1909–2008), Polish pioneer nurse, credited with establishing the modern Polish nursing profession

== I-L ==
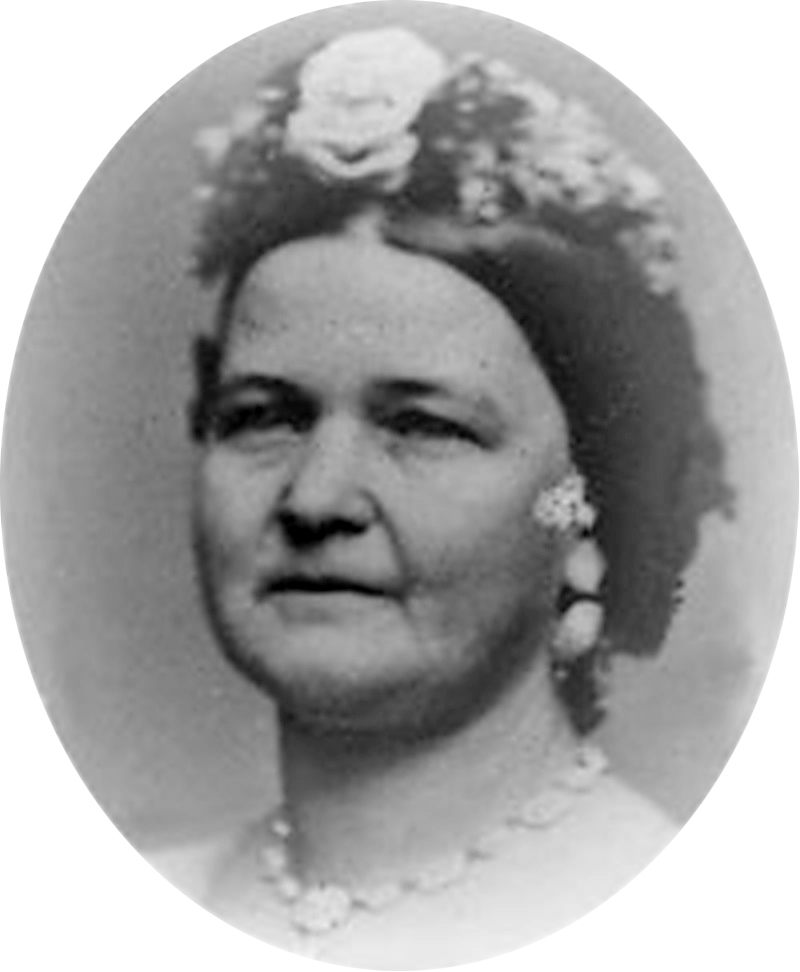
Mary Todd Lincoln

- Euphemia Steele Innes RRC DN (1874–1955), Scottish nurse, matron of Leeds General Infirmary and of 2nd Northern General Hospital, founded Leeds Nurses' League
- Calamity Jane (1852–1903), American frontierswoman and nurse
- Sally Lucas Jean (1878–1971), American health educator and nurse
- Victoria Jensen (1847–1930), deaconess, nursing supervisor, from 1914 head of Copenhagen's Deaconess Institute
- Lillie Johnson, CM (1922–2025), Jamaican-Canadian nurse and sickle-cell disease activist
- Hazel Johnson-Brown (1927–2011), first African-American head of the United States Army Nurse Corps
- June Jolly (1928–2016), British pioneer of children's nursing
- Violet Maud Evelyn Jones (1890-1942) Principal Matron, QAIMNS, killed in World War II
- Liliane Juchli (1933–2020), Swiss nurse and author/editor of a highly influential nursing textbook
- Caroline Keer RRC & Bar (1857–1928), British military nurse, matron-in-chief Queen Alexandra's Royal Army Nursing Corps
- Virginia Clinton Kelley (1923–1994), American nurse anesthetist and mother of United States President Bill Clinton
- Alicia Mary Kelly ARRC, MM (1874–1942), Irish-born Australian nurse, First World War
- Eunice Muringo Kiereini (born 1939), chief nursing officer of Kenya and first African president of the International Council of Nurses
- Marjorie Mayson Killby MBE (1889-1981) - British nurse involved in setting up nurse training in Romania
- Docia Kisseih (1919–2008), Ghanaian nurse and midwife, initiated advances in nursing and nurse training in post-independence Ghana
- Thora Knudsen (1861–1950), Danish nurse, trades unionist and women's rights activist
- Charlotte Kratz (1922–2006), British nurse pioneer in community health, first UK PhD in nursing
- Margaret Currie Neilson Lamb (1907–1992), British nurse, first nurse to chair General Nursing Council in Scotland
- Tina Lavender (born 1965/66), British midwife and professor
- Florence Sarah Lees (1840–1922), pioneer in District Nursing in the U.K.
- Daurene Lewis, (1943-2013), nurse and first Black woman mayor in North America
- Janet Lim (1923–2014), nurse, St. Andrew's Community Hospital; first nurse from Singapore to study in Britain; inducted as 2014 Singapore Women's Hall of Fame
- Mary Todd Lincoln (1818–1882), volunteer nurse during the American Civil War
- Winifred W. Logan (1926–2025), British nurse theorist and co-author of the Roper-Logan-Tierney model of nursing
- Kate Evelyn Luard, RRC and Bar (1872–1962), British nurse and writer
- Ljubica Luković (1858–1915), established the first nurses' training course in Serbia and in 1925 was posthumously awarded the Florence Nightingale Medal

== M-N ==
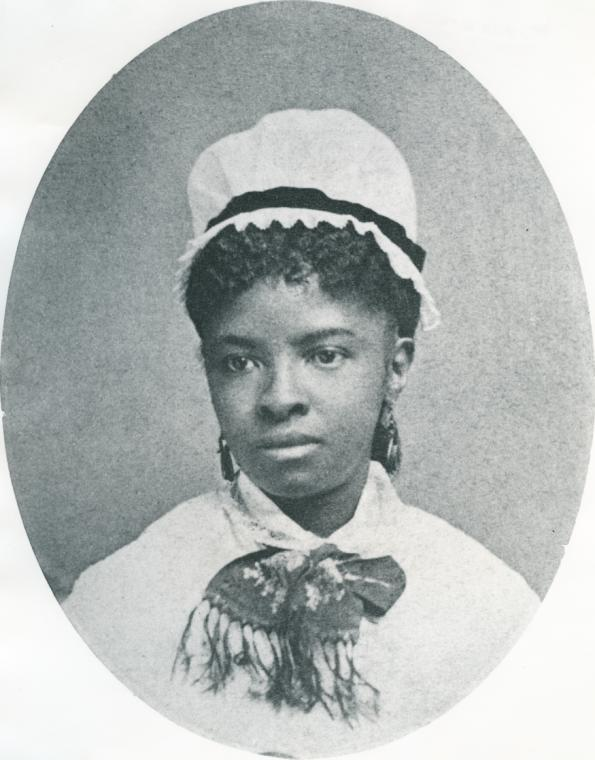
Mary Eliza Mahoney

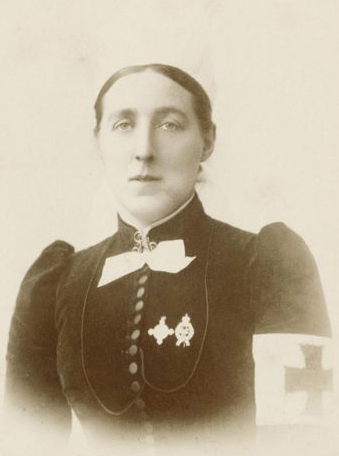
Kate Marsden

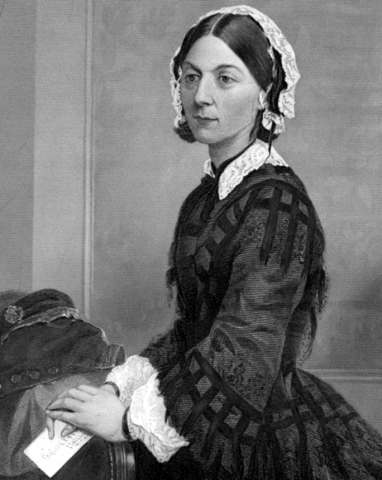
Florence Nightingale

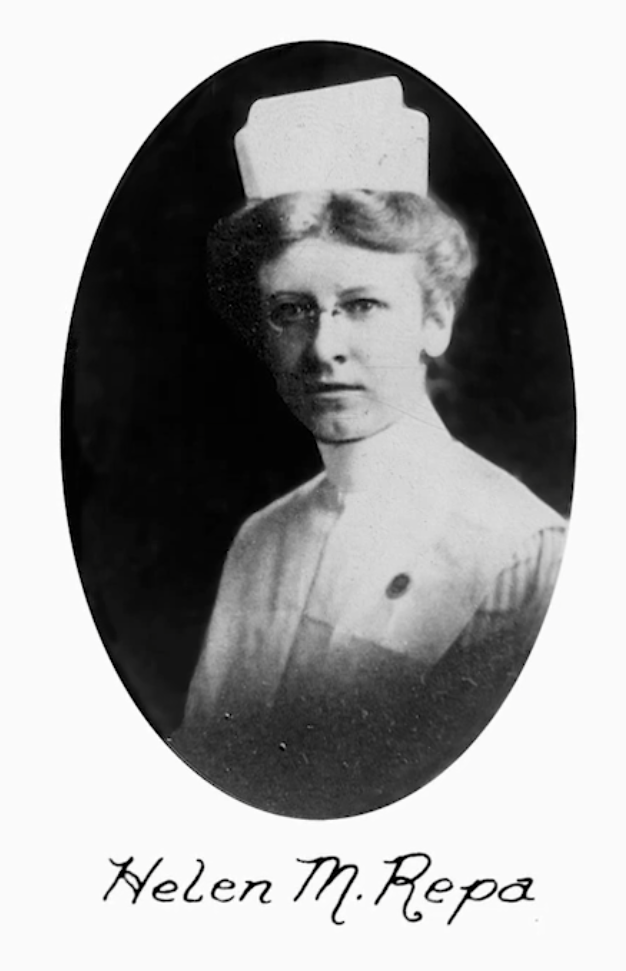
Helen Repa

- Dorothy Macham ARRC (1910–2002), Canadian nurse; executive director, Toronto's Women's College Hospital
- Eliza Mackenzie (1816–1892), Scottish military-nurse superintendent
- Emily MacManus (1886–1978), British nurse; matron, Guy's Hospital; president, Royal College of Nursing 1942–1944
- Princess Marie-Louise of Madagascar (1897–1948), Malagasy royal and World War II nurse; created a dame of the Legion of Honour
- Cecilia Makiwane (1880–1919), first African registered professional nurse in what would become South Africa
- Mary, Princess Royal and Countess of Harewood (1897–1965), British royal; undertook some nurse training and was a prominent advocate for nursing
- Mary Eliza Mahoney (1845–1946), first professionally trained African-American nurse
- Jeanne Mance (1606–1673), French nurse; founder, Hôtel-Dieu de Montréal (1645)
- Sophie Mannerheim (1863–1928), pioneer of modern nursing in Finland
- Edith Gertrude Manners OBE, RGN, SCM (1899–1966), matron, Glasgow Royal Infirmary (1947–1960)
- Marie Manthey (1935-2024), one of the originators of primary nursing
- Louise de Marillac (1591–1660), founder, Daughters of Charity of Saint Vincent de Paul
- Kate Marsden (1859–1931), British missionary nurse and explorer
- Sister M. T. Martin (1881–1929), Australian nurse sister who made graffiti in Egypt
- Anna Maxwell (1851–1929), U.S. Army nurse whose activities were crucial to the growth of professional nursing in America
- Carolyn McCarthy, (1944-2025), American nurse; became a politician
- Mabel Mary McCutcheon MBE (1886–1942), British-born nurse; established health facilities at Port Adelaide
- Jean McFarlane, Baroness McFarlane of Llandaff (1926–2012), British nurse; member, House of Lords
- Louisa McLaughlin (1836–1921), one of the first British Red Cross nurses; served in two wars
- Louise McManus (1896-1993), American nurse; first nurse to earn a PhD
- M. Helena McMillan (1869–1970), Canadian-American nursing educator
- Barbara McNulty (1917–2008), British nurse; known for her work with Dame Cicely Saunders in developing the U.K. hospice service and the world’s first community palliative-care service
- Janet Melrose (1860–1928), British nurse; matron, Glasgow Royal Infirmary
- Eleanor Jeanette Merry OBE (died 1982), British nurse in the mid-20th century; became director of the National Council of Nurses
- Agda Meyerson (1866–1924), pioneering Swedish nurse
- Jane Minor, also known as Gensey Snow (1792–1858), African-American healer, midwife, and slave emancipator
- Marie de Miribel (1872–1959), French nurse, Catholic activist and politician in Paris
- Beatrice Monk (1882–1962), matron, The London Hospital; president, College of Nursing (now RCN)
- Madeleine Molinier (1898–1976), French scientist and later Paris hospital nurse who initially worked with Marie Curie
- Lady Elizabeth Montagu (1917–2006), British nurse and novelist
- Janet Ann Moore MBE (1880–1968), New Zealand civilian and army nurse, nursing administrator, and hospital matron
- Honnor Morten (1861–1913), British nurse, journalist and campaigner
- Sarah Mullally (born 1962), British nurse; chief nursing officer: became bishop of London
- Charlotte Munck (1876–1932), Danish nurse; important figure in the training of nurses
- Annie Murray (1906–1996), Scottish nurse who went to the Spanish Civil War
- Helen Mussallem (1915–2012), executive director, Canadian Nurses Association
- Dame Ellen Musson (1867–1960) DBE, RRC first nurse to be Chair of UK General Nursing Council
- Anne Elizabeth Musson (c.1884-1958) MBE, ARRC Matron of Royal Victoria Hospital, Belfast (1922-1946)
- Razan al-Najar (1996/1997–2018), Palestinian nurse; shot during a rescue in 2018 Gaza border protests
- Elizabeth Grace Neill (1846–1926), New Zealand nurse; campaigned for state registration of nurses (New Zealand being the first country in the world to achieve this in 1901)
- Bertha Moraes Nérici (1921–2005), Brazilian nurse; served in World War II
- Bonnie Nettles (1927–1985), American nurse; co-leader, Heaven's Gate religious cult
- Nora Neve (1873–1952), pioneer of missionary nursing in Kashmir
- Mary Ann Brown Newcomb (1817–1892), American Civil War nurse following the Battle of Fort Donelson
- Betty Nicolas (1921-1991) FRCN British mental health nurse, pioneering Education Officer at General Nursing Council
- Elizabeth B. Nichols (1821–1911), American Union nurse during the American Civil War
- Florence Nightingale (1820–1910), British pioneer of modern nursing
- Doreen Norton (1922–2007), British nurse; pioneer in prevention of bedsores
- Lucille Elizabeth Notter (1907–1993), American nurse and nursing researcher
- Clara Noyes (1869–1946), enrolled 20,000 Red Cross nurses for World War I service, founded the first school for midwives in the U.S.
- Peggy Nuttall (1917–2008), British nurse; journalist, editor and director, Nursing Times
- Mary Adelaide Nutting (1858–1948), Canadian nurse, educator; pioneer in the field of hospital care

== O-R ==
- Dora Opoku OBE (1948-2010) Ghanaian-British nurse-midwife and authority on medical research ethics
- Sarah Elizabeth Oram, DBE, RRC (1860–1946), senior military nurse; acting matron-in-chief, Queen Alexandra's Imperial Military Nursing Service
- Rosabelle Osborne CBE, RRC (died 8 May 1958) British military nurse; principal matron, War Office; matron-in-chief, Queen Alexandra's Imperial Military Nursing Service (QAIMNS)
- Lucy Osburn (1836–1891), Australia's first professionally trained nurse
- Katherine Olmsted (1888–1964), American Red Cross nurse
- Rosalind Paget, DBE (1855–1948), nurse reformer, and midwife
- Hettie Kersey Painter (1821–1889), American physician; American Civil War nurse
- Emily Elizabeth Parsons (1824–1880) American Civil War nurse; hospital administrator, and founder, Mt. Auburn Hospital
- Sara E. Parsons (1864–1949), American nurse, writer and health administrator
- Edith Helen Paull (1902–1975), Indian medical nurse from Uttar Pradesh; associated with the Indian Red Cross Society
- Emma Maria Pearson (1828–1893), writer; one of the first British Red Cross nurses; served in two wars
- Fanny Pease (1866–1946), British nurse; militant suffragette
- Lucy Creemer Peckham (1842–1923), American nurse, physician, and poet
- Sue Pembrey (1942–2013), British nurse pioneer of patient-centred hospital care
- Hildegard Peplau (1909–1999), American nurse and academic; created the middle-range nursing theory of interpersonal relations
- Chief Kofoworola Abeni Pratt (1915–1992), Nigerian nurse, first black Chief Nursing Officer of Nigeria
- Dame Winifred Prentice (1910–2007) DBE, matron, Stracathro Hospital; president, Royal College of Nursing (1972–1976)
- Alex Pretti (died 2026), American nurse; shot dead by United States Border Patrol agents
- Ethel Clay Price (1874–1943), American nurse and socialite; first graduate of Watts Hospital Training School for Nurses
- Barbara Quaile OBE (1906–1999), Scottish nurse, midwife; matron, Glasgow Victoria Infirmary; lady superintendent, Royal Infirmary of Edinburgh
- Sheila Quinn (1920–2016), president, Royal College of Nursing (1982–1986); executive director, International Council of Nurses (1967–1970)
- Dorothy MacBride Radwanski (1928–2012), Scottish nurse pioneer in occupational health nursing
- Halima Rafat, pioneer Afghan nurse and women's rights activist, one of the first nurses of Afghanistan
- Kaye Lani Rae Rafko (born 1963), American nurse; became Miss America 1988
- Emmy Rappe (1835–1896), first professionally trained Swedish nurse pioneer in the education of nurses
- Elizabeth Raybould (1926–2015), English nurse; pioneer in nurse education in Northern Ireland
- Claire Rayner (1931–2010), British nurse; became a journalist, agony aunt and activist
- Dame Kathleen Raven (1910–1999), chief nursing officer, U.K. Department of Health
- Eileen Rees (1912–2008), nurse educationalist; chief nursing officer, University Hospital of Wales
- Dorothy E. Reilly (1920–1996), American nurse and nursing educator
- Helen Repa (1884–1938), Czech-American nurse; hero of the SS Eastland disaster of 1915
- Anna Reynvaan (1844–1920), first professionally trained nurse in the Netherlands
- Gertrude Richards, CBE, RRC (1864–1944), British nurse and senior military nursing leader
- Linda Richards (1841–1930), America's first professionally trained nurse
- Isabel Hampton Robb, American nurse theorist; helped develop early programs of nursing education
- Kathleen Robb (1923–2020), Northern Irish nurse and last matron of the Royal Victoria Hospital in Belfast
- Elaine Roe (1919-1998), U.S. Army nurse; one of the first four women to be awarded the Silver Star
- Edith MacGregor Rome (1870–1938) British nurse and matron; president, Royal College of Nursing
- Catherine Roy CBE, RRC, MM (1883–1976), Scottish military nurse; served at the front during the First World War; matron-in-chief, Queen Alexandra's Imperial Military Nursing Service.
- Juanita Rule (1914–2008), British nurse, educator and trade unionist

== S-T ==
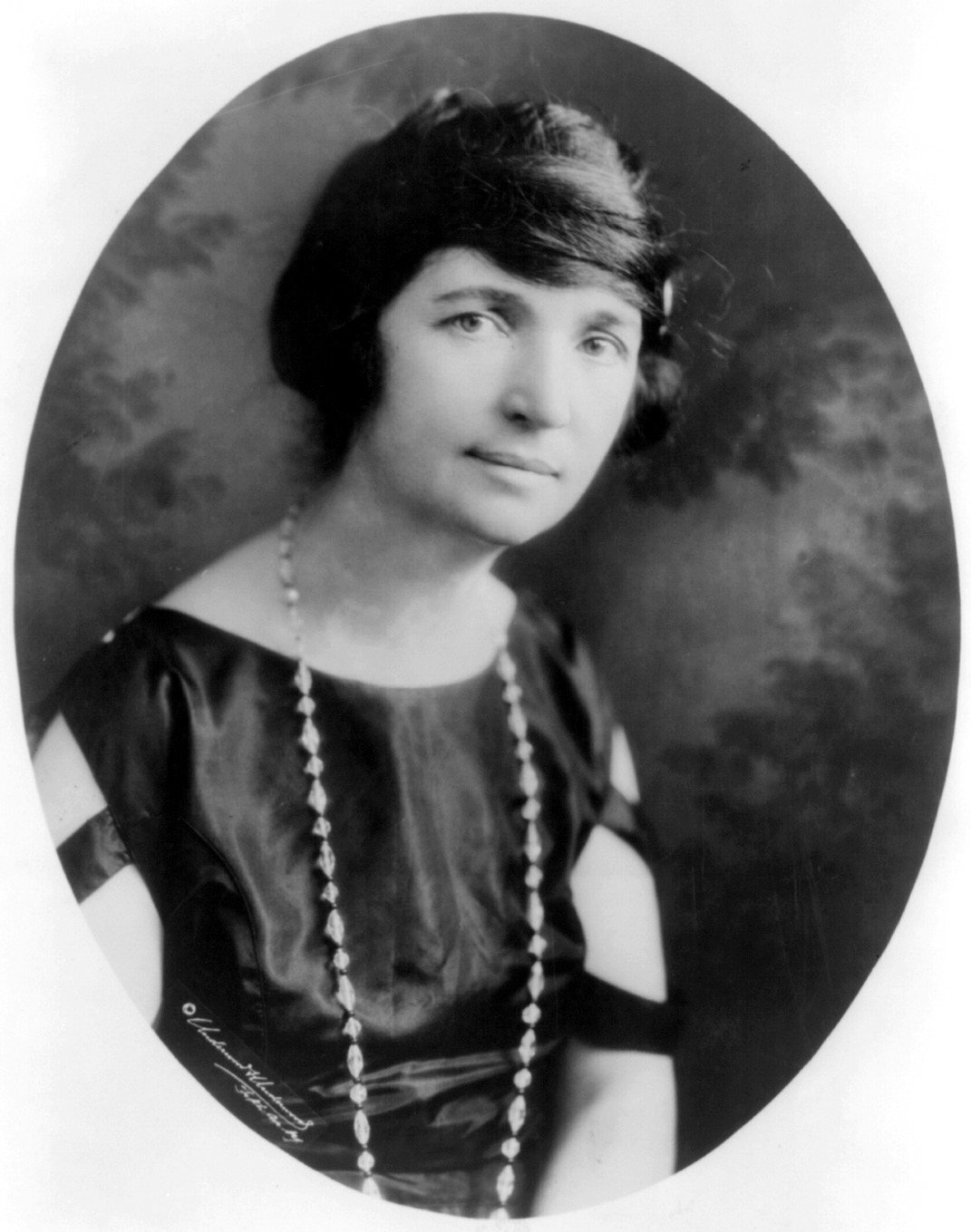
Margaret Sanger

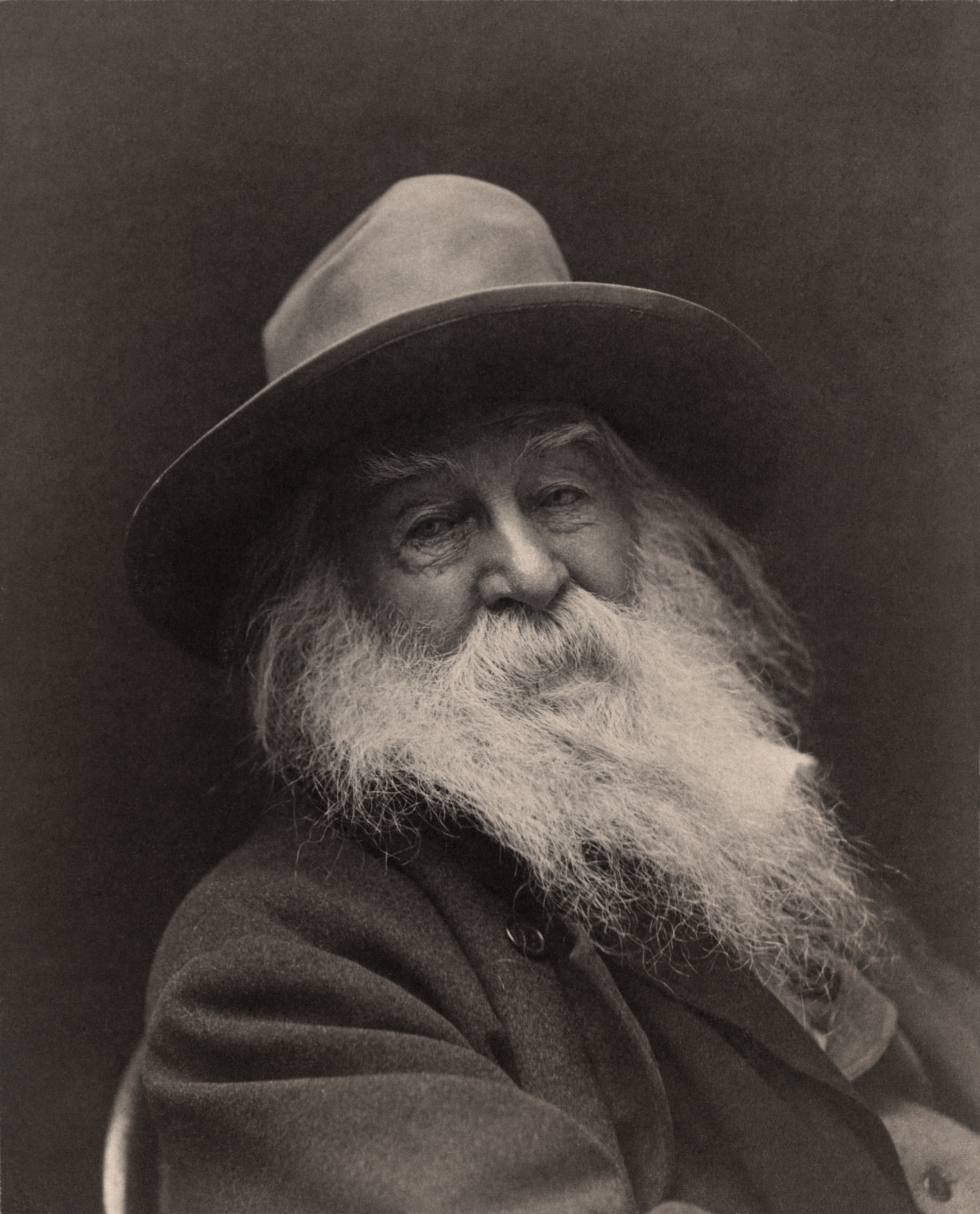
Walt Whitman

- Margaret Sanger (1879–1966), American nurse; founder, U.S. birth control movement
- Dame Cicely Saunders (1918–2005), British nurse; influenced the hospice movement
- Betty Schmoll (1936–2015), American nurse; founder, Hospice of Dayton, one of the first hospice programs in the United States
- Linda Spoonster Schwartz (born 1944), American nurse and veteran advocate
- Lynda Scott, New Zealand nurse; became member, Parliament
- Kathleen Stirling Scrymgour OBE (1895–1982), Australian hospital matron; founding member, president and fellow of what became the Royal College of Nursing in Melbourne
- Mary Seacole (1805–1881), Jamaican-British nurse in the Crimean War; known as "the Black Florence Nightingale"
- Schwester Selma (1884–1984), German-Jewish head nurse in Jerusalem; known as "the Jewish Florence Nightingale"
- Flora Madeline Shaw (1864–1927), Canadian nurse and nursing teacher
- M. Elizabeth Shellabarger (1879–1967), American army nurse during World War I; director, American Red Cross Nursing Service in Albania and Montenegro
- Nigar Shikhlinskaya (1871–1931), first professionally trained Azerbaijani nurse
- Kapelwa Sikota (1928–2006), first Zambian registered nurse
- Kathleen Simon, Viscountess Simon (1864–1955), British nurse and midwife; later married Sir John Simon, an abolition-of-slavery campaigner
- Ida Mabel Murray Simmons MBE (1881/2 or 1888–1958), public-health nurse; greatly improved maternal and infant health-care standards in Singapore
- Hilda Marjorie Simpson (1914–1992), British nurse; pioneer in nursing research; founder, Royal College of Nursing Research Society
- Muriel Skeet (1926–2006), British nurse; chief nursing officer, British Red Cross Society
- Eileen Skellern (1923–1980), influential British mental-health nurse
- Jessie Sleet Scales (1865–1956), first black public-health nurse in the United States
- Dame Anne Beadsmore Smith DBE, RRC & Bar (1869–1960), British nurse; British Army officer
- Dorothy Smith (nurse) CBE (1895–1988), British matron; chair, General Nursing Council
- Helen Gregory Smith, military nurse; matron, Glasgow Western Infirmary
- Myrah Keating Smith (1908–1994), nurse, midwife; only medical provider on Saint John, U.S. Virgin Islands for two decades
- Mary Southcott (1862–1943), Canadian nurse leader; founder, Graduate Nurses’ Association of Newfoundland
- Mabel Keaton Staupers (1890–1989), advocate for racial equality in the nursing profession during era of American segregation.
- Daphne Steele (1929–2004), Guyanese matron; first Black matron in the British National Health Service
- Maria Stencel (1900–1985), Polish nurse; director, School of Nursing at Łódź in 1946
- Maude Storey (1930–2003), president, Royal College of Nursing (1988–1990)
- Mae Woughter Strack (died 1941), American nurse; member, National Health Council
- Catherine Stronach (1875 - 1962), CBE, RRC, British nurse with military career
- Margaretta Styles (1930–2005), American advocate for standardization of nursing credentials; dean, University of California, San Francisco Nursing School; past president of the American Nurses Association and International Council of Nurses
- Sarah Swift (1954–1937), matron-in-chief, British Red Cross Society in World War I; co-founder, Royal College of Nursing
- Vera Blanche Thomas (born 1903), American nurse; president, Arizona State Nurses' Association (1927–1928)
- Adah Belle Samuels Thoms (1870–1943), African-American nurse; pioneering African-American–rights activist; fought for African-American nurses to be permitted to serve in the U.S. armed forces
- Godiva Marian Thorold (1840–1918), British nurse, matron; founding member, British Nursing Association
- Violetta Thurstan (1879–1978), British nurse; decorated for bravery during the First World War
- Robert Tiffany (1942–1993), British nurse; president, European Oncology Nursing Society
- Annie Rensselaer Tinker (1884–1924), volunteer nurse in World War I, suffragist, and philanthropist
- Sally Louisa Tompkins (1833–1916), humanitarian and philanthropist during the American Civil War
- Harriet Tubman (c. 1822–1913), African-American abolitionist
- Theodora Turner OBE, ARRC (1907–1999), matron, St Thomas' Hospital; president, Royal College of Nursing (1966–1968)

== U-Z ==
- Florence Udell, British nurse; president, Royal College of Nursing (1964–1966)
- Florence Wald (1917–2008), American nurse; founder, hospice movement in the U.S.
- Lillian Wald (1867–1940), American nurse, founder of visiting nursing in the U.S.
- Lucy Wamsley, OBE (1871–1947), British nurse, hospital matron; Lady Inspector for the Local Government Board
- Wang Xiuying (b. 1908, disappeared 1990), Chinese nurse, educator, and public health advocate
- Mary Ward (nurse) (1884–1972), English nurse to the boat people on the waterways
- Almyra Maynard Watson (1917–2018), American military nurse and officer in the United States Army Nurse Corps
- Agnes Watt, RRC (1859–1946), British nurse; oversaw the introduction of modern Nightingale-style nursing whilst matron, Radcliffe Infirmary; principal matron in the Territorial Force Nursing Service, of the 3rd Southern General hospital, Oxford, 1909–1922
- Dame Katherine Watt DBE, RRC, CStJ (1886–1963), British military nurse, nursing administrator and civil servant
- Jean Watson, American nurse theorist and nursing professor; known for her theory of human caring
- Anna von Wattenwyl (1841–1927), Swiss religious worker and nurse during the Franco-Prussian War
- Faye Wattleton (born 1943), American nurse; became president, Planned Parenthood Federation of America
- Richard Wells (nurse) (1941–1993), British nurse; shaped the nursing response to HIV/AIDS in the U.K.
- Grace Margery Westbrook CBE (1910–1999), British nurse; first practising nurse to be elected chair of the Staff Side of the Nurses and Midwives Whitley Council
- Elizabeth Wettlaufer (born 1967), Canadian serial killer who murdered eight of her patients with insulin injections
- Walt Whitman (1819–1892), American poet, American Civil War nurse
- Beatrice Brysson Whyte (1921–1993), British nurse and educator
- Jane Renwick Smedburg Wilkes (1827–1913), American Civil War nurse; co-founder, St. Peter's Hospital
- Elizabeth Elaine Wilkie (1915–1998), Scottish nurse; instrumental in the development of health-vsitor training in the U.K.
- Louisa Wilkinson (1889–1968), matron-in-chief, Queen Alexandra's Imperial Military Nursing Service; president, Royal College of Nursing
- Phyllis J. Wilson, American nurse and military officer
- Mary Opal Wolanin (1910–1997), American nurse; expert in eldercare
- Sara Wolfe (born 1973), indigenous Canadian nurse, midwife, and healthcare advocate
- Lavinia Young (1911–1986), British nurse; matron, Westminster Hospital
- Sarah Palmer Young (1830–1908), American Civil War nurse; memoirist
- Tome Yoshida (1876–1963), Japanese nurse; developed the Fukuoka nursing school
- Sophie Zahrtmann (1841–1925), deaconess, nurse; head, Copenhagen's Deaconess Institute

== See also ==
- List of African-American women in medicine
- List of Danish nurses
- List of nurses who died in World War I
- List of nurse-politicians
