= Women in nursing =

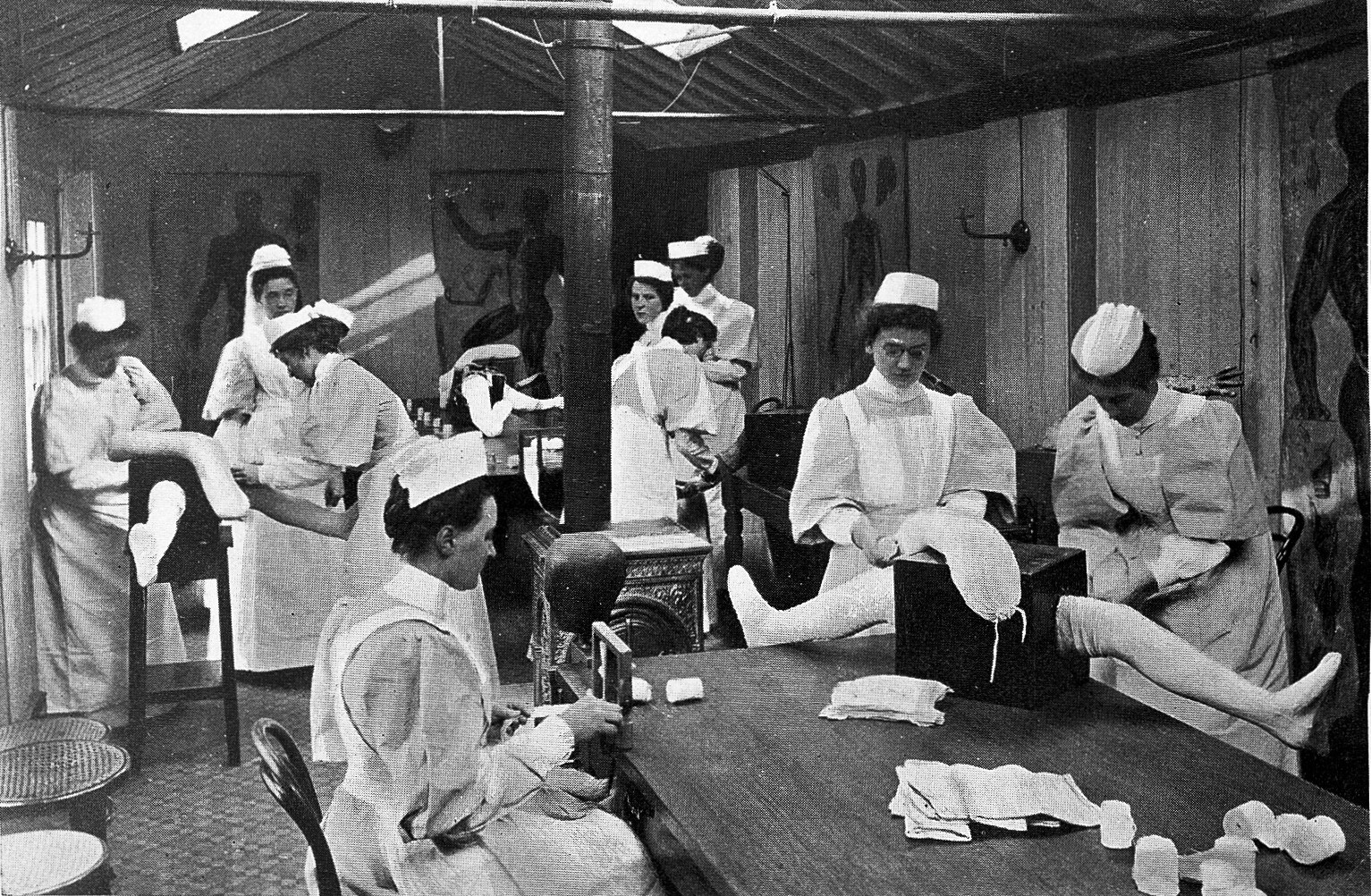
Women nursing students take a bandaging class run by the Royal London Hospital.

Historically, women have made up a large majority of the profession and academic discipline of nursing. Women's nursing roles include both caring for patients and making sure that the wards and equipment are clean. In the United States, women make up the majority of the field of nursing, comprising 86% of Registered Nurses (RNs) in 2021; globally, women comprise 89% of the nursing workforce.

== Daily tasks throughout history ==
Nurses in the past were often required to work long days and care for many patients, for very little pay. In addition, the typical university setting where nurses learned the work of the trade was not in existence back then. Instead, nurses learned the trade while working in the field. Another difference was that nursing students were called probationers. As probationers, they were required to follow the strict rules and regulations that were set forth by the institution. Additionally, probationers were required to follow all physicians’ orders without question and perform various household duties. After learning how to take orders, probationers were then sent to the operating room for a 6-week rotation. During that 6-week period, probationers learned how to inventory sterile bandages, keep operating room meticulously clean and provide sterile water for surgeons during surgery. Upon completion of their training, probationers turned into nurses.

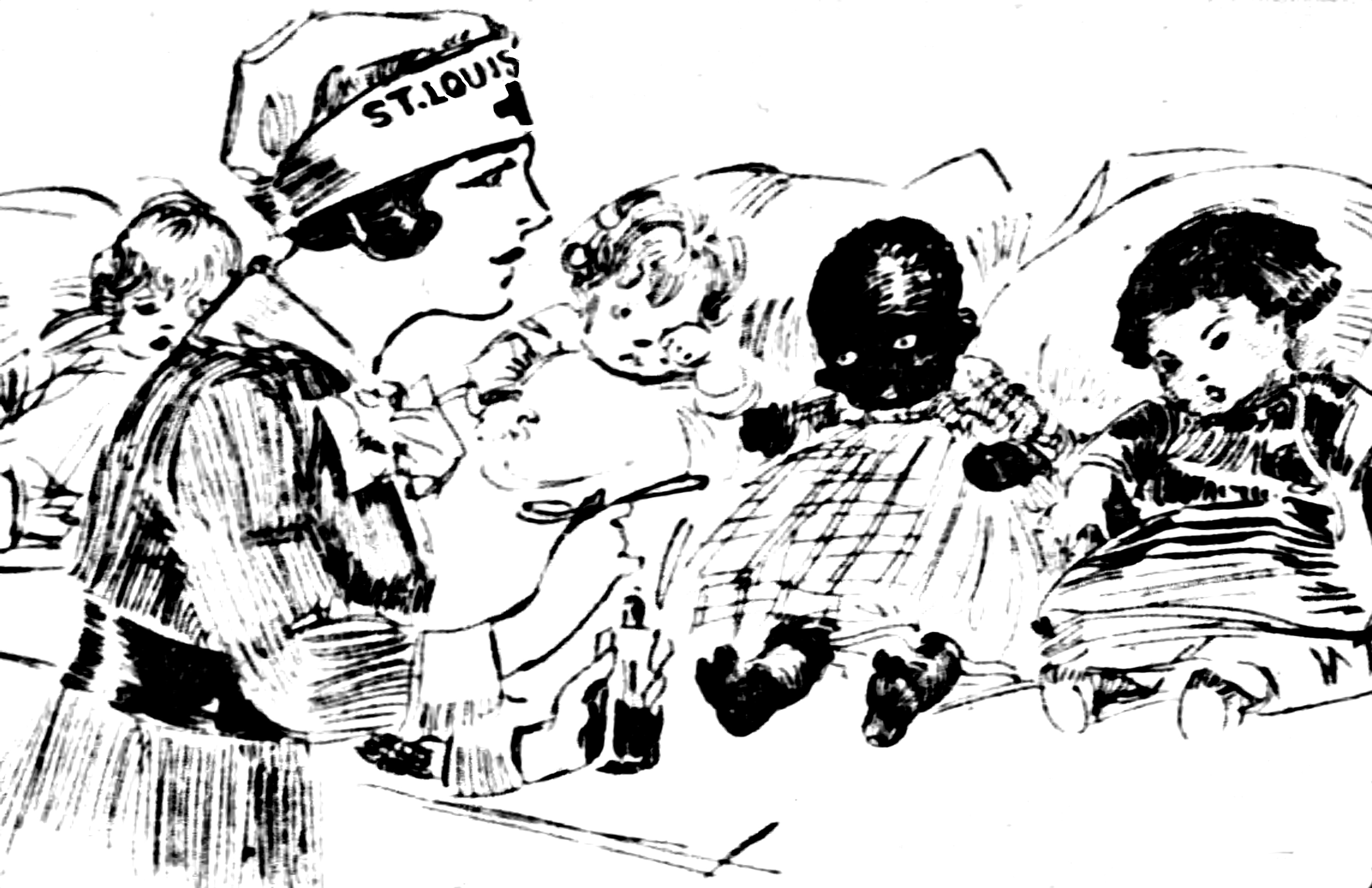
February 1918 drawing by Marguerite Martyn of a visiting nurse in St. Louis, Missouri, with medicine and babies

As nurses, some of their roles included providing patient education concerning nutrition and child related illnesses when needed. In general, nurses were the ones responsible for bathing patients, inserting catheters, dispensing medications, administering enemas, keeping the ward clean, and making sure that everything was documented correctly. During that time, there were no nurses' aides available to help with the daily care of patients. Thusly, all tasks fell upon the nurse. To add to that long list of tasks, a nurse was also responsible for preparing any holistic medications that were needed at the time to treat the various alignments that patients presented with. In the present time, holistic medications are hardly used, and any medications that are required are generally handled and prepared by a pharmacy. This is with the expectation of some intravenous (IV), antibiotics, and insulin preparations that the nurse will prepare on the floor (after receiving an order from a doctor). Listed below are more duties of nurses in these time periods.

=== 1880s ===
- Nurses had 50 patients apiece to care for and were in charge of both their nursing notes and keeping the ward clean. Some of their daily tasks are listed below:
  - Daily sweep and mop the floors of your ward; dust the patients’ furniture and window sills.
  - Maintain an even temperature in your ward by bringing in a scuttle of coal for the day's business.
  - Light is important to observe the patient's condition; therefore, each day fill kerosene lamps, clean chimneys, and trim wicks. Wash windows once a week.
  - The nurse's notes are important in aiding the physician's work. Make your pens carefully. You may whittle nibs to your individual taste.
  - Each nurse on day duty will report every day at 7 a.m. and leave at 8 p.m., except on the Sabbath on which day you will be off from noon to 2 p.m.
  - Graduate nurses in good standing with the director of nurses will be given an evening off each week if you go regularly to church.
  - Each nurse should lay aside from each payday a goodly sum of her earnings for her benefits during her declining years, so that she will not become a burden. For example, if you earn $30 a month, you should set aside $15.
  - Any nurse who smokes, uses liquor in any form, gets her hair done at a beauty shop, or frequents dance halls will give the director of nurse's good reason to suspect her worth, intentions, and integrity.
  - The nurse who performs her labors, serves her patients and doctors faithfully and without fault for a period of five years will be given an increase by the hospital administration of 5 cents a day, providing there are no hospital debts that are outstanding.

=== During the war ===
- War time saw a demand for nurses. For that demand to be filled, nurses made the transition into the battlefield, leaving their home life behind. On the battlefield, the main duty was to care for the sick and wounded. During war, nurses main focus was to heal the wounds. Nurses had taken no breaks, did not consume meals, or no rest periods.

=== After the war ===
- Completion of the war helped nurses gained a new level of respect from having learned about both anesthesia and psychiatric nursing. Additionally, around this time penicillin was created. Penicillin was invented in the year of 1928. This in turn helped to cure many infections and ultimately save many lives.
- Following the completion of the war nurses were able to receive benefits as well as a more diverse workforce.

=== 1950s ===
- During this generation injections were "still prepared with a pestle and mortar. Oxygen tanks were strapped to beds and there was very little equipment that was disposable. Nurses were in charge of sharpening needles and sterilizing catheter units."

=== 1960s ===
- The 1960s brought about the development of the Intensive Care Units (ICU) where nurses were required to read telemetry monitors and take patient's blood pressure. The development of Intensive Care Units was established by 'father of modern intensive care' Max Harry Weil. the ICU, the ability to be able to specialize in one field of nursing and obtain an advanced nursing degree (i.e. nurse practitioner degree) become available. Another thing that nurses were required to do (no matter what field they are in) was to stand when doctors entered the room. Lastly, female nurses were still wearing the traditional white uniform and hat.

=== 1970s ===
- This period saw several changes, with one being that new nurses had to generally work the graveyard shift as they worked their way up in the ranks. Generally, nothing came prepared, which left nurses responsible for mixing, calculating and drawing up both antibiotics and IV medications. To add to this nurses were still using paper charts and medication was kept under lock and key in a cabinet. The last main thing about this period was that nurses were still required to stand when doctors entered the room and the traditional white uniform and hat were still in practice in some facilities but with some modifications.

=== 1980-1990s ===
- Within this time frame, nurses saw an improvement of technology and its introduction into the field of nursing. The improved technology improved efficiency but it also required that nurses had to go back to training so that they knew how to use it in practice.
- During this time frame as well patient care technician was introduced, their tasks were to conduct basic care to patients. It helped the nurses a lot giving them a helping hand.

=== 2000s ===
- Nurses in this period today are still responsible for the direct care of patients (i.e. bathing, feeding, toileting, ambulating, positioning), following doctor's orders, taking vital signs, obtaining daily weights, recording both input and output, obtaining various lab samples, administering medications and charting. Additionally, a nurse may delegate some of those tasks to the nursing aide, but only if the delegation is within the person's skill level and if the facility allows the nurse to delegate that specific task.
- Nurses in this period today we are being introduced to newer technology such as the electronic medical record, which made it easier providing medications, progress notations, and any concerns. In this time as well stimulation labs were provided to give nursing students a better education. Until this day nurses are being introduced to new advancements.

== Nurse's uniforms throughout history ==
=== 19th century ===
During this time nursing uniforms were very similar to "servants’ uniforms, which consisted of a full black or printed gown with a white gathered or banded cap and a white apron." Around 1840, the field of nursing gained more respect and nurses were trained more. With this said the uniforms worn at this time started to change from the servant uniforms to the more classic "ladylike gowns with white aprons and caps to indicate that they were nurses." During this time, Florence Nightingale introduced new forms of education and uniforms for nurses, including the introduction of different colored hat bands to illustrate rank. "Fresh nurse students would wear ribbon bands of pink, blue, or other pastel colors. Senior nurses and nursing teachers would wear black ribbon bands to indicate seniority."

=== 20th century ===
A World War I nurse in a Red Cross ward uniform (left) and another nurse wearing a dark blue cape (right)

This period brought about the start of change in the uniforms by adding white bibs and pockets to the dresses. In addition, large hats were worn that resembled a nun's hat and veil. These types of uniforms stayed in practice up until the First World War, when it was decided that the uniforms needed to be revamped to make them more practical and improve nurses' efficiency. For instance, the sleeves on the uniforms were changed so that they rolled up, the bulky aprons were removed, and the shirts shortened. All these things helped with convenience and allowed nurses to function better, and were often coupled with shoulder-covering capes, which were usually navy or dark blue in colour on the outside with red lining on the inside.

By the 1950s, paper hats and simple folded hats replaced the large, elaborate crown-like caps that were worn by nurses during the First World War. The simple paper hats were more comfortable. The policy to use hats to denote seniority level was abolished, since the morale of nurses was affected by the discrimination. Dresses also evolved, since no one has the time to launder elaborately tailored clothing anymore. Dresses became less form fitting and were easy to wash, iron and wear."

By the 1970s with the appearance of males in the field wearing scrubs, the female uniforms once again changed, they "became less gendered". The hat was lost and uniforms become less formal. In addition, they started to resemble normal clothing. By the 1980s, the cap and the cloth apron were gone. To replace the cloth apron, nurses started to wear disposable ones.

=== Today ===
Nurses today continue to wear scrubs with many different colors and patterns available. The scrubs usually consist of drawn string pants and a V-neck top. The formal uniform (i.e. color and patterns allowed) though varies by policy. In some facilities it is required that the different types of employees all wear different color scrubs so that their specific job title can be determined by their scrub color. For example, "nurses in one color, techs in another, etc." Additionally "some hospitals are even going back to requiring that nurses wear white, though they haven't yet returned to skirts, hats, and stockings."

== Female nurses in popular culture ==
- Christine Chapel
- Carla Espinosa
- Audrey March Hardy
- "Hot Lips" Houlihan
- Samantha Taggart
- Julia (1968 TV series)

== Notable women in nursing ==
See List of nurses.

- Florence Nightingale
- Kelli Dee Hidalgo
- Mary Todd Lincoln
- Clara Barton
- Mary Eliza Mahoney
- Mary Seacole
- Mary Breckinridge
- florence Guinness Blake
- Edith Cavell
- Helen Fairchild
- Elizabeth Grace Neill
- Margaret Sanger
- Sophie Mannerheim
- Hazel W. Johnson-Brown
- Joyce Slinsky
- Jeanne Prentice
- Virginia Avenel Henderson
- Christiane Reimann
- Martha Ballard
- Dorothea Dix

The nurses listed obtained great recognition because of their achievements such as being the first ever graduate nurse, the first person to establish the profession of nursing, and established a school for nursing as well as different types of nursing subfields.

== See also ==
- Gender role
- Nurse stereotypes
- Women in medicine
- History of Medicine
- Nurse-client relationship
- Transcultural nursing
- History of Nursing
- History of nursing in the United States
- Nursing
