= Mary Ward =

Mary Ward may refer to:

== Scientists and academics ==
- Mary Ward (nurse) (1884–1972), English nurse to the boat people on the waterways
- Mary Ward (scientist) (1827–1869), Irish amateur scientist, killed by an experimental steam car
- Mary Alice Ward (1896–1972), Australian teacher and pastoralist

== Writers ==
- Mary Ward (suffragist) (1851–1933), Irish-born Cambridge based Women's activist. lecturer and writer
- Mary Augusta Ward (1851–1920), British activist and novelist, known by her married name of Mrs Humphry Ward
  - Mary Ward Centre, an adult education college located in London named for the above Mary Augusta Ward
- Mary Behrendsen Ward (1894–1985), American poet and fiction writer
- Mary Jane Ward (1905–1981), American novelist
- Mary Ward Brown (1917–2013), American writer
- Mary Eastman Ward (1843–1907), American poet

== Entertainers ==
- Mary Ward (actress) (1915–2021), Australian actress and radio broadcaster
- Mary Mae Ward, a fictional character on the American ABC TV serial General Hospital, played by Rosalind Cash

== Other ==
- Mary Ward (nun) (1585–1645), English Catholic nun who founded the Institute of the Blessed Virgin Mary
  - Mary Ward Catholic Secondary School, an educational college in Scarborough, Canada, named for the English Catholic nun
- Mary Ward (book), a 1939 English language biography of the nun Mary Ward by Ida Friederike Görres
- Mary Ward (ship), a passenger and cargo steamer built in Montreal, Canada in 1865, wrecked in a storm in 1872

== See also ==
- Mary Frances Xavier Warde (1810–1884), one of the original Sisters of Mercy
