= Turbot Township, Pennsylvania =

Township in Pennsylvania, US

Coordinates: 41°02′00″N 76°47′59″W

- Township
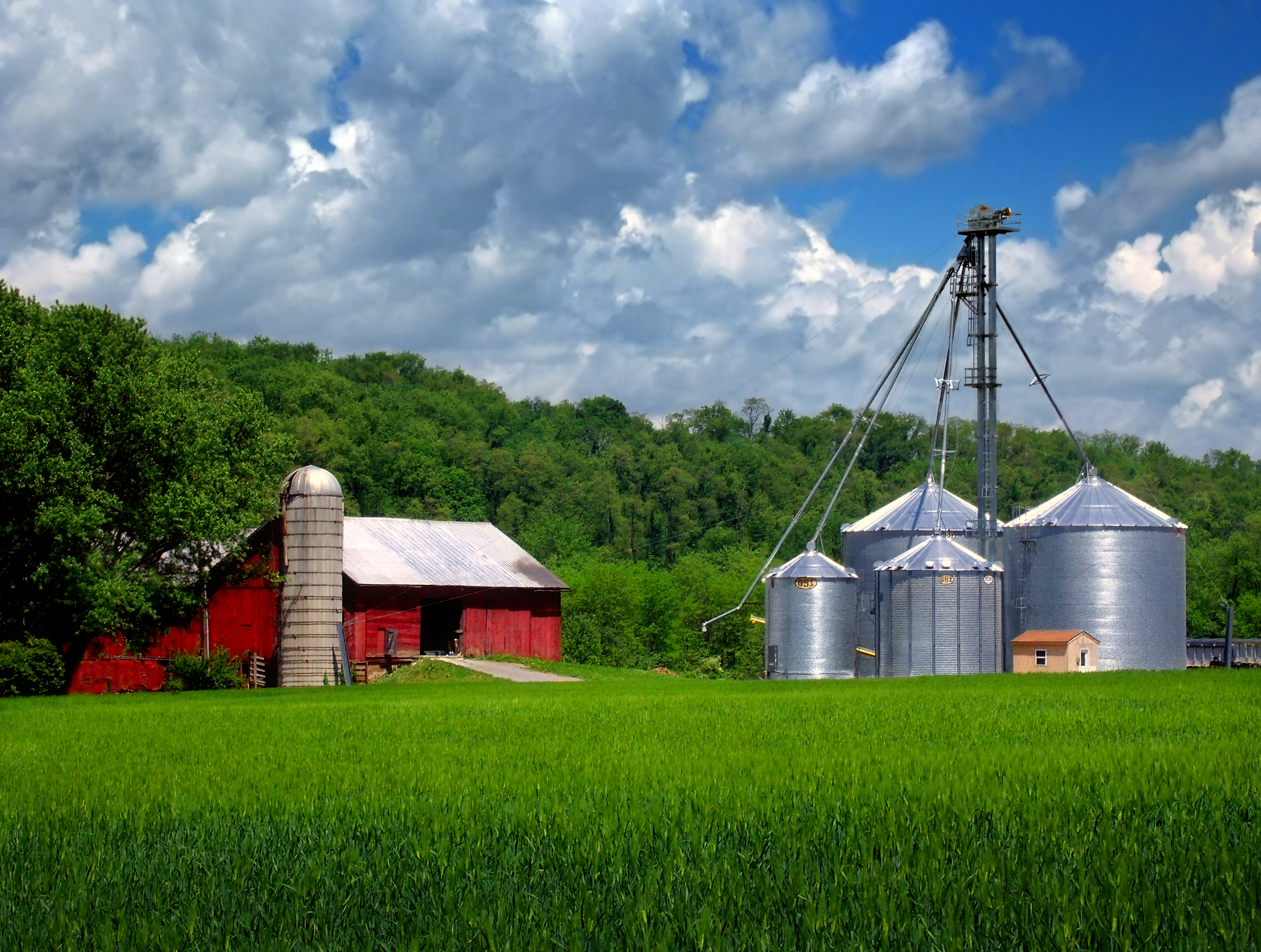
- a farm in the township

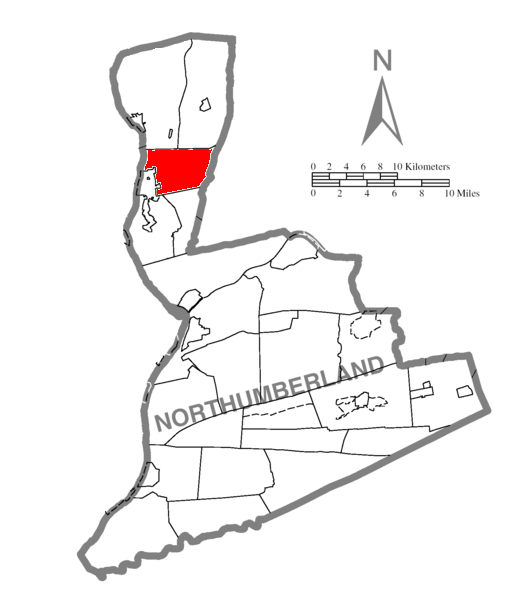
- Map of Northumberland County, Pennsylvania highlighting Turbot Township

- Map of Northumberland County, Pennsylvania
- Country: United States
- State: Pennsylvania
- County: Northumberland
- Settled: 1750
- Incorporated: 1772

Government
  - Type: Board of Supervisors

Area
  - Total: 14.07 sq mi (36.45 km^{2})
  - Land: 13.83 sq mi (35.83 km^{2})
  - Water: 0.24 sq mi (0.62 km^{2})

Population (2010)
  - Total: 1,806
  - Estimate (2016): 1,767
  - Density: 127.7/sq mi (49.32/km^{2})
- Time zone: UTC-5 (Eastern (EST))
  - Summer (DST): UTC-4 (EDT)
- Area code: 570
- FIPS code: 42-097-77830

Turbot Township is a township in Northumberland County, Pennsylvania, United States. The population at the 2010 Census was 1,806, an increase over the figure of 1,677 tabulated in 2000.

== Geography ==
According to the United States Census Bureau, the township has a total area of 14.1 square miles (36.4 km^{2}), of which 13.9 square miles (35.9 km^{2}) is land and 0.2 square mile (0.6 km^{2}) (1.63%) is water. The township has an exclave of about 11 acres surrounded by the Borough of Milton.

== Demographics ==
Historical population
Census	Pop.	Note	%±
2010	1,806		—
2016 (est.)	1,767		−2.2%
U.S. Decennial Census

As of the census of 2000, there were 1,677 people, 674 households, and 518 families residing in the township. The population density was 121.1 inhabitants per square mile (46.8/km^{2}). There were 692 housing units at an average density of 50.0 per square mile (19.3/km^{2}). The racial makeup of the township was 97.44% White, 1.25% African American, 0.30% Asian, 0.06% Pacific Islander, 0.36% from other races, and 0.60% from two or more races. Hispanic or Latino of any race were 0.83% of the population.

There were 674 households, out of which 28.5% had children under the age of 18 living with them, 69.3% were married couples living together, 3.7% had a female householder with no husband present, and 23.1% were non-families. 20.8% of all households were made up of individuals, and 9.8% had someone living alone who was 65 years of age or older. The average household size was 2.48 and the average family size was 2.82.

In the township the population was spread out, with 22.6% under the age of 18, 4.7% from 18 to 24, 26.7% from 25 to 44, 26.8% from 45 to 64, and 19.3% who were 65 years of age or older. The median age was 43 years. For every 100 females, there were 99.9 males. For every 100 females age 18 and over, there were 98.2 males.

The median income for a household in the township was $43,704, and the median income for a family was $48,906. Males had a median income of $34,271 versus $24,375 for females. The per capita income for the township was $19,732. About 3.3% of families and 6.1% of the population were below the poverty line, including 9.6% of those under age 18 and 5.9% of those age 65 or over.

== Notable person ==
- Helen Fairchild (1885–1918), a World War I nurse with the AEF
