= Kathleen Hope Barnes =

Australian nurse (1909–1981)

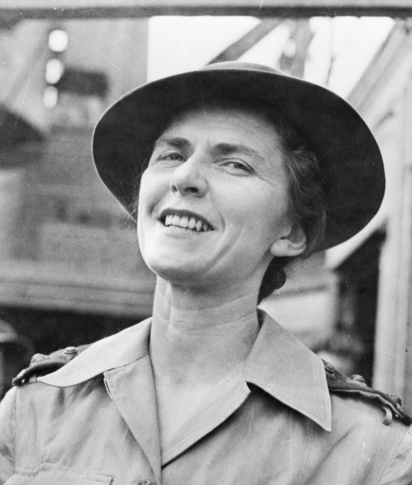
- Born: May 19, 1909; Cottesloe
- Died: July 4, 1981 (aged 72); Nedlands
- Education: Methodist Ladies' College
- Occupations: Nurse; Navy captain

Kathleen Hope Barnes ARRC MBE (May 19, 1909 – July 4, 1981) was an Australian nurse who was promoted to captain in the Australian Army Nursing Service during the second world war. She was mention in dispatches and was honoured by the Red Cross and with an MBE.

== Life ==
Barnes was born in Cottesloe in 1909. Her parents were Scottish born Agnes Kirkwood (born Burns) and her husband who was the Irish born James Barnes. Her father kept a shop. She was educated in the Perth suburb of Claremont at the Methodist Ladies' College.

In 1939 war was being declared in Britain and France and Barnes joined the Australian Army Nursing Service. In April 1940 she was in the first group of Western Australian nurses to be sent overseas when she left Fremantle on the Nevassa.

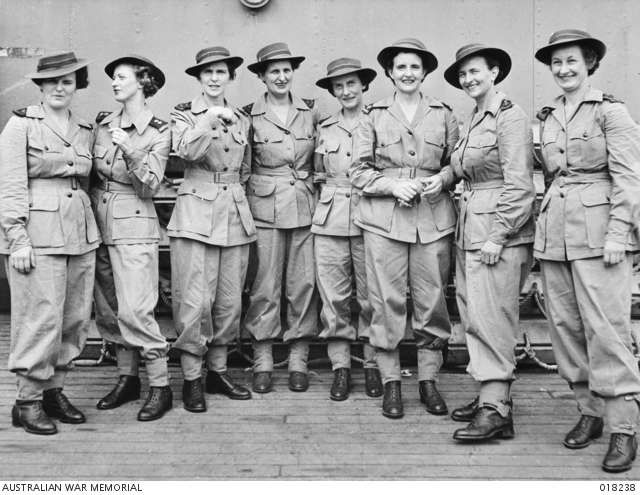
First nursing sisters of the Australian Army Nursing Service (AANS) to arrive in New Britain

In October 1942 she was in Port Moresby where she joined the 105th Casualty Clearing Station. She was a staff nurse and in the following March she became a lieutenant, and in August she was a captain. In November 1944 the Australian forces landed in Jacquinot Bay. In February 1945 she led the first few nurses to arrive in Jacquinot Bay who were the first on the island of New Britain.

In 1947 she was mentioned in dispatches and she became an associate of the Royal Red Cross. In the same year she joined the Silver Chain District and Bush Nursing Association where she was promoted until she was metropolitan nursing superintendent in 1955. She left ten years later after overseeing an expansion in the work. In 1958 she was the founding treasurer of the War Nurses' Memorial Association.

Barnes died in Nedlands in 1981.
