= Florence Blake =

American nurse, professor and writer

- Born: November 30, 1907; Stevens Point, Wisconsin
- Died: September 12, 1983 (aged 75)
- Education: University of Michigan
- Occupations: Nursing professor and author
- Known for: Family-centered nursing care
- Awards: ANA Hall of Fame

Florence Guinness Blake (November 30, 1907 - September 12, 1983) was an American nurse, professor and writer who made significant contributions to pediatric nursing and to family-centered nursing care. Blake wrote her classic text, The Child, His Parents and the Nurse, in 1954. She co-authored two other pediatric nursing textbooks, Essentials of Pediatric Nursing and Nursing Care of Children. She was on the nursing faculty at several American universities. She was posthumously honored with induction into the American Nurses Association Hall of Fame.

== Biography ==
Florence Blake was born on November 30, 1907. She was the daughter of musician Thelma Dunlap Blake and minister James Blake. She graduated from the Michael Reese Hospital School of Nursing in 1928. She completed an undergraduate degree from Columbia University in 1936. After teaching pediatric nursing in China for several years, she earned a master's degree from the University of Michigan in 1941. Beginning in the 1940s, Blake headed the graduate program in advanced pediatric nursing at the University of Chicago.

Blake's 1954 book, The Child, His Parents and the Nurse, highlighted the importance of parent-child relationships and parental involvement in the medical care of children. In a review published in the Yale Journal of Biology and Medicine, Morris Green wrote that the book represented the first textbook that attempted to provide comprehensive nursing knowledge on child care. Green wrote that "the emphasis is not limited to technical procedures and disease processes (disease-oriented care) but broadened to include a better understanding of the needs of children and parents (patient-oriented care) in health as well as disease."

Blake led the advanced pediatric nursing graduate program at the University of Wisconsin-Madison between 1963 and her retirement in 1970. She died on September 12, 1983. Blake was inducted into the American Nurses Association Hall of Fame in 1996.

== See also ==
- List of nurses
