= Marie de Miribel =

French missionary in Paris (1872-1959)

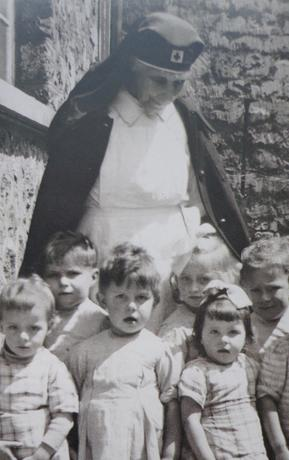
- Born: Marie Josèphe Adrienne de Miribel; 18 March 1872; Paris, France
- Died: 7 November 1959 (aged 87); Paris, France
- Burial place: Charonne cemetery
- Education: Visitation convent
- Occupations: Nurse, war resistor, missionary
- Father: General Marie François Joseph de Miribel

Marie de Miribel (born 18 March 1872 and died 7 November 1959), was a French nurse, Catholic activist and politician in Paris. She was the founder of the Croix Saint-Simon charity for social and hospital works, built the Croix Saint-Simon Hospital and took part in the French Resistance during the Second World War.

== Biography ==
Marie Josèphe Adrienne de Miribel was born in Paris in 1872 into an ancient noble family, called the Copin de Miribel, as the daughter of General Marie François Joseph de Miribel, then a colonel in the artillery, and his wife Henriette Louise de Grouchy. Educated at the Visitation convent, she became a lady-in-waiting to the Duchess of Orléans.

Her meeting with Father de Gibergues, founder of the Diocesan Missions, changed the direction of her life. She took part in the women's teams who went door-to-door distributing leaflets, taking advantage of the opportunity to identify families living in extreme poverty. She was overwhelmed by the poverty, the number of sick needing help, the unhealthy state of many homes, and the number of children to be cared for. Father de Gibergues allowed her to remain in the Charonne quarter, in eastern Paris, in direct contact with the poor through regular visits to families.

On 13 May 1906, as part of a diocesan mission, Marie de Miribel opened the Union House in the Charonne district. In 1912, she built the Croix Saint-Simon Hospital at 125 rue d'Avron. In 1922, she was one of the founding members of the Fédération des centers sociaux de France (FCSF) and she remained a member of the FCSF federal council until shortly before her death.

She was involved with young mothers, mutual aid teams, victims of tuberculosis and cancer, infant and neonatal mortality, and the fight against venereal disease. She was nicknamed "the saint of everyday life."

=== War years ===
From 1941 to 1944, she represented the Père-Lachaise district on the Paris City Council during the German occupation of World War II. Marie de Miribel also joined the French Resistance. She was a member of the Social Services Liaison Committee. In 1944, she became a Paris councilor. After the war, she welcomed 3,000 former prisoners and deportees into her dispensary. She extended her activities and had the equipment modernized in line with technical advances.

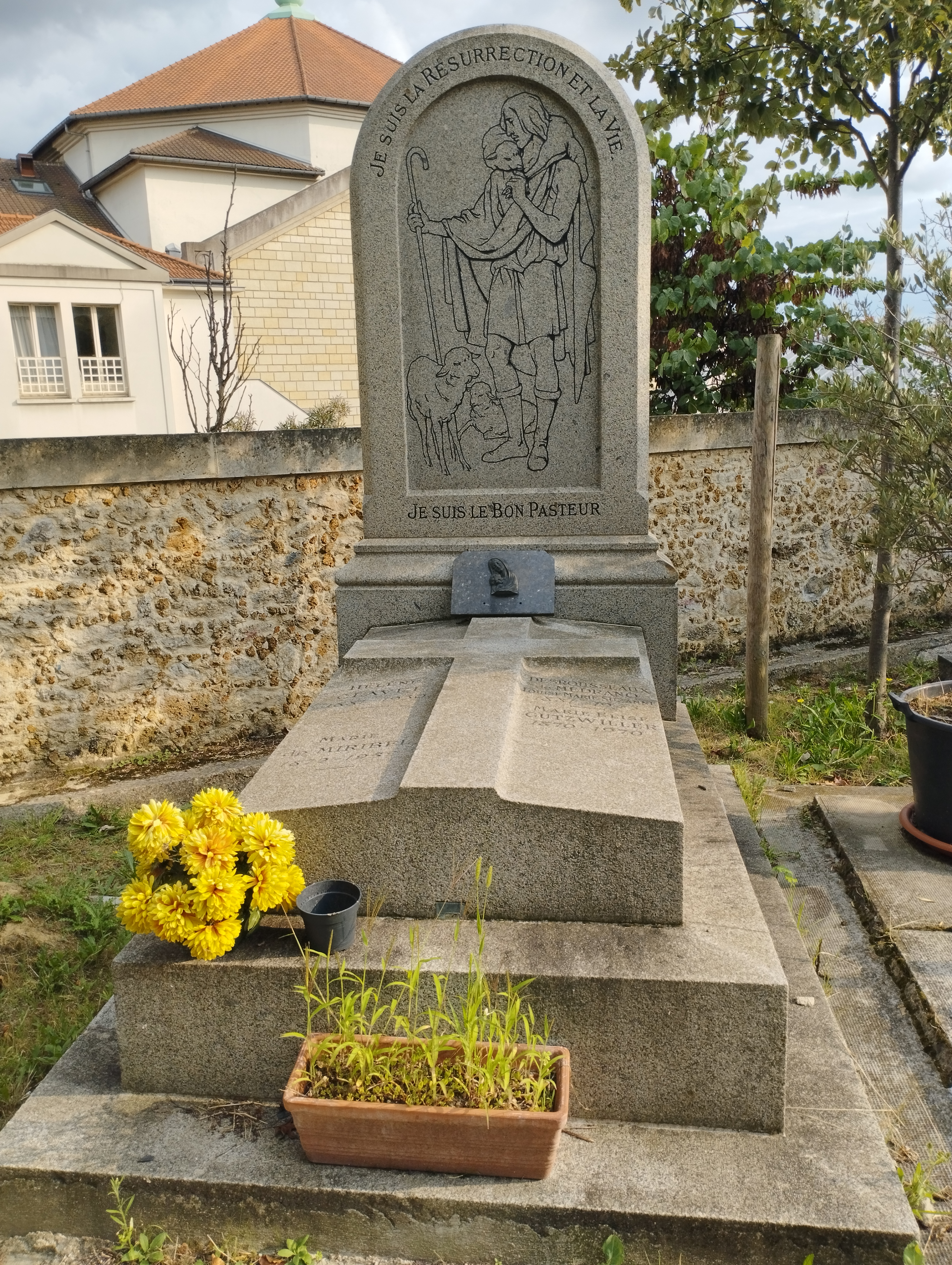
Marie de Miribel's grave in Charonne cemetery (division 1).

Marie de Miribel died in Paris on 7 November 1959. She was buried in her wartime nurse's uniform, without decoration, as she had refused both the Croix de Guerre and the Légion d'Honneur, her motto being "honor, no honor."

Her grave is located in the small Charonne cemetery adjoining the Saint-Germain-de-Charonne church (division 1, section 2).

=== Legacy ===
In the Charonne district of Paris, the town square called Place Marie-de-Miribel has been dedicated to her since 1982, near the premises of the Croix Saint-Simon charity. In 2012, when the T3b line of the Paris metro was extended, a "Marie de Miribel" station was created not far from the square named after her.

A day care center named for Marie de Miribel in the 11th arrondissement offers a daily support program for elderly or fragile people suffering from Alzheimer's disease or related disorders.
