= Margaret Turner Clarke =

Australian nurse

Margaret Turner Clarke (née McLachlan; c. 1836-8 – August 1887) was an Australian nurse and philanthropist. She was a pioneer within nursing in Australia. A student of the Florence Nightingale School for Nurses, she was the founder of the Visiting Relief Society (for health care in the gold fields) in 1865, and a co-founder of the pioneer nursing education Home and Training School for Nurses in Sydney (1882).

== Early life and education ==
Clarke was born in Tasmania, one of eight children of Charles McLachlan, a merchant in Hobart and a member of the Tasmanian Legislative Council, and his wife Isabella, née Dick. Charles McLachlan's work took him to Britain during Margaret's childhood, and she was educated in England, becoming proficient on the harp.

== Adult life and philanthropy ==
Clarke married her first husband, Captain John Lunan Wilkie of the 12th Regiment of Foot on 22 April 1856, at St David's Cathedral, Hobart. They had three daughters, one still-born in Hobart in 1857, one born in London in 1859, who did not survive infancy, and the third still-born in Sydney in 1861. In 1861, the regiment was sent to Lambing Flat, the scene of a gold rush and anti-Chinese violence. Clarke found the poor living conditions of the 15,000 miners shocking. On 1 February 1862, her husband died of apoplexy after falling from his horse, and Clarke returned to England. There, she trained at the Nightingale School for Nurses set up by Florence Nightingale at St. Thomas' Hospital, London.

She returned to Australia, and to Lambing Flat (renamed Young in 1863), by 1865. She had inherited about £3,000 on Wilkie's death, and "it was her favorite study to seek for all who were in trouble or poverty, and relieve their necessities to the utmost of her power." In November 1865, after a season of famine there, she established a Visiting Relief Society in Young. The following year, on 9 August 1866 at Trinity Church, Melbourne, she married George O'Malley Clarke, a magistrate and gold commissioner at Young,

Clarke also gave a great deal of support to the Church of England in the Young area. She donated £500 towards the total cost of £1,500 of building St. John's Church in Young as a memorial to her first husband, and also worked to raise additional funds, engage an architect, import materials, and she sewed the church needlework. She also helped to raise funds for a Church of England school and parsonage, and a public school, at Young, and for St Matthew's Church of England in the small village of Wombat.

In 1882, Clarke and her husband moved to Sydney. There, she helped to establish the Home and Training School for Nurses for the Sick, and donated £150-£200 per year to the Sydney City Mission. The Home and Training School for Nurses, situated in Phillip Street, Sydney, as well as having more than twenty nurses available for paid employment, also provided nurses to "seek out and relieve, with food and proper attendance, the sick whose poverty would otherwise place such relief beyond their reach."

Clarke died at her home in Woollahra, Sydney, on 8 August 1887, of heart failure. She was buried at Waverley Cemetery, with the service conducted by the Rev. Henry Wallace Mort, rector of All Saints Anglican Church, Woollahra. She left bequests to the Sydney City Mission and the Church Society of the Anglican Diocese of Goulburn, among others.
