= Louisa Bicknell =

Australian civilian and military nurse (1879–1915)

Louisa Annie Bicknell (1879 – 25 June 1915) was an Australian civilian and military nurse who died while serving in World War I.

== Early life ==
Bicknell was born in Abbotsford, Victoria, Australia in 1879, the seventh of twelve children of Eliza and John Bicknell. She initially learnt dressmaking, but later decided to train as a nurse. She trained at Mooroopna Hospital and worked at the Women’s Hospital.

== Career ==
Bicknell opened her own private hospital at Bairnsdale and nursed there for eight years. In April 1915 she enlisted in the Australian Army Nursing Service and embarked for Egypt on the Kyarra. She was stationed at Heliopolis, Cairo at the No.1 Australian General Hospital.

== Death ==
Bicknell sustained a scratch on her hand while nursing wounded soldiers, and developed pyaemia, a type of infection. She was ill for about six days, and died on 25 June 1915. Before she died, it was reported that she said: "How hard it is to die with so little accomplished, but I would go through it all again to help."

Bicknell is buried in the Cairo War Memorial Cemetery. She is remembered on the Bairnsdale Shire honour roll and on a memorial to overseas nurses who died in World War I at the Elizabeth Garrett Anderson Hospital in London.
