= Mary A. Hickey =

American nurse and health administrator (1874–1954)

Mary A. Hickey

Mary A. Hickey (December 1, 1874 – February 14, 1954) was an American nurse and health administrator. She was the first superintendent of nurses of the United States Veterans Bureau Nursing Services, who served this position for 20 years. She was also involved in the suffrage movement.

== Biography ==
Mary A. Hickey was born in Ireland on December 1, 1874, and her family later emigrated to the United States. She completed her early education at Springfield Central High School, Massachusetts. She received a diploma in nursing from St. Mary's School of Nursing in Brooklyn, New York City. She also studied advance courses in nursing from Teachers College, Columbia University.

She began her professional career as a public health nursing supervisor at the Massachusetts State Department of Health. Following the start of World War I, she resigned from her position and joined the American Red Cross to work in overseas service. She was stationed at an American hospital in France. In April 1918, she was enlisted as an Army Nurse Corps, serving with surgical units in the Champaign sector near the frontlines.

On her return in 1919, she joined the United States Public Health Service and was promoted to assistant superintendent of nursing in 1921. Meanwhile, as the United States entered World War I in 1917, the United States Congress reorganized the veterans' welfare programs and institutions. On August 9, 1921, an office named Veterans Bureau Nursing Services was created by consolidating all the programs related to veterans that were earlier administered by the Bureau of War Risk Insurance, Federal Board of Vocational Education, and Public Health Service. Hickey was subsequently appointed as the first superintendent of nurses in the newly established Veterans Bureau for looking after the nursing care of the veterans.

She also served as chief nurse at Baltimore and Fort McHenry. She was the director in the federal government section of the American Nurses Association and the president of the District of Columbia League of Nursing Education.

She died on February 14, 1954.
