= M. Helena McMillan =

Canadian-American nursing educator (1869 – 1970)

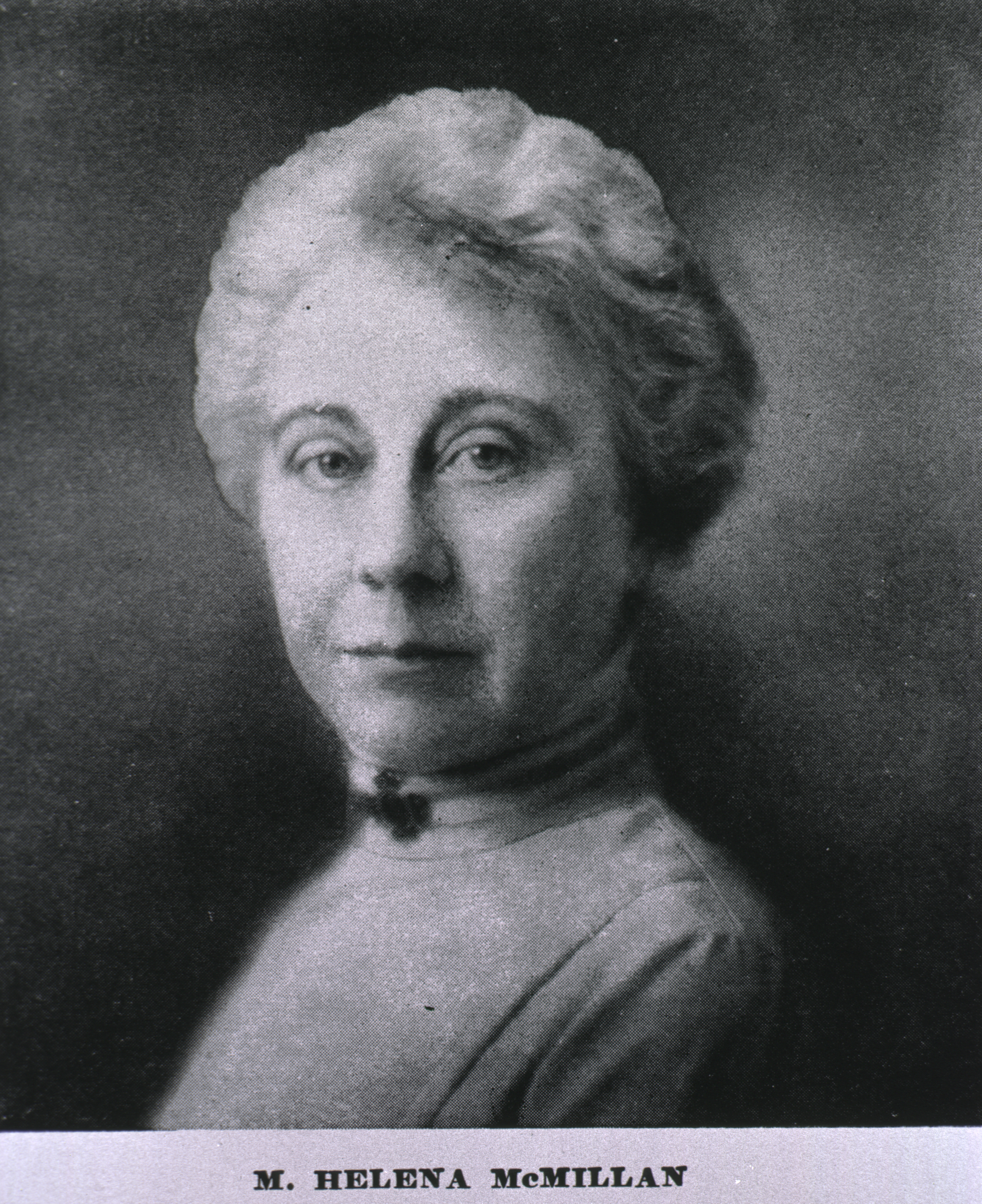
- Born: 1869; Montreal, Canada
- Died: January 28, 1970 (aged 100–101); Boulder, Colorado
- Education: McGill University; Illinois Training School for Nursing
- Occupation: Nursing educator
- Known for: Founded the Presbyterian Hospital School for Nurses

M. Helena McMillan (1869 – January 28, 1970) was a Canadian-American nursing educator. She founded the Presbyterian Hospital School for Nurses in Chicago and remained its director for 35 years. In 1907, she played an important role in the passage of the Illinois's first Nurse Practice Act.

== Biography ==
M. Helena McMillan was born in 1869 in Montreal, Canada. She attended private schools before earning her BA at McGill University in Canada. She later enrolled at the Illinois Training School for Nursing, where she graduated in 1894.

She worked as Lady Superintendent, Kingston General Hospital, Kingston, Canada, from 1895 to 1897.

In 1898, she organized the Lakeside Hospital School of Nursing in Cleveland, Ohio, which later became a part of Western Reserve University. In 1903, she returned to Chicago and founded the Presbyterian Hospital School for Nurses, which was affiliated with Rush Medical College (RMC).

In 1899, she became a member of the International Council of Nurses. She served as the president of the Illinois State Association of Graduate Nurses. She held important administrative responsibilities at the National League for Nursing Education, including the offices of secretary, treasurer, vice president, and member of the Board. She was also associated with American Nurses Association.

She died on January 28, 1970, in Boulder, Colorado, United States.

== Selected works ==
- McMillan, M. Helena. "The objects of the graduate nurses' association of Cleveland." AJN The American Journal of Nursing 1, no. 3 (1900): 187-193.
- McMillan, M. Helena. "The duties of the head nurse." The American Journal of Nursing 1, no. 9 (1901): 640-643.
- McMillan, M. Helena. "The physical effect of the three years' course." AJN The American Journal of Nursing 7, no. 10 (1907): 767-770.
- McMillan, M. Helena. "Recent Developments in Hospital Service (Continued)." The American Journal of Nursing (1923): 89-93.
- Dock, Lavinia L., Lillian D. Wald, Linda Richards, Katharine DeWitt, Isabel Hampton Robb, Isabel McIsaac, M. Helena McMillan, Harriet Higbee, and James E. Russell. "Thirty-Five Years Ago They Were Saying." The American Journal of Nursing (1935): 905-908.
