= Edith de Magalhães Fraenkel =

Brazilian nurse (1889–1969)

Edith de Magalhães Fraenkel (Rio de Janeiro, May 8, 1889 - April 5, 1969 (or 1968?) Ibid.) was a Brazilian nurse, a pioneer of Brazilian health and nursing; she collaborated in the fight against the Spanish flu.

== Life ==
Edith de Magalhaes Fraenkel was the daughter of Aldina de Magalhaes and Karl Fraenkel (1854–1906). Karl Fraenkel was born in Frankfurt am Main as the son of physician Daniel Fraenkel and his wife Julia (née Rosenthal). In 1914, the Brazilian Red Cross began training nurses in intensive courses. Edith de Magalhaes Fraenkel completed this training and then worked as a volunteer for the Red Cross. In 1918, she dedicated herself to the fight against the "Spanish flu", which affected the whole country and killed 15,000 people in Rio de Janeiro The initiative to fight the "Spanish flu" in Brazil was led by physician Carlos Chagas (1879–1934).

In 1919, Fraenkel completed additional training as a community nurse in the treatment of tuberculosis. She was later appointed by Carlos Chagas to the National Department of Public Health. Chagas was then director of the department. On a study trip to the US, Chagas learned about the training of community nurses in the USA. In the United States, they were trained in the tradition of Florence Nightingale. Chagas sought to develop something similar for Brazil. Chagas got the attention of the Rockefeller Foundation. In 1921, Edith de Magalhães Fraenkel, who at the time was in charge of the tuberculosis prevention center of the National Department of Public Health, received a scholarship to study nursing in the United States. In April 1922, she enrolled in the Philadelphia School of Nursing. In 1925, she was the first Brazilian nurse to complete her studies. She returned to Brazil the same year and became the first professor at the department's "School of Nursing". This school was later called the "Anna Nery School of Nursing" and is now part of the Federal University of Rio de Janeiro .

In 1927, Edith de Magalhães Fraenkel became the first president of the Brazilian Nursing Association and developed its regulations and ordinances. From 1927 to 1939, Edith de Magalhães Fraenkel became senior health nurse at the National Department of Public Health. Then she accepted a call to the "School of Nursing" at the University of São Paulo to set up this nursing school with support from the Rockefeller Foundation. The Rockefeller Foundation donated laboratories and a library. At the same time, the medical school and its hygiene institute were supported with know-how and specialized laboratories. The Rockefeller Foundation again awarded Edith de Magalhães Fraenkel a scholarship to the United States and Canada. Fraenkel was able to study the curricula at Johns Hopkins University, Boston University, and the University of Toronto in Canada. In 1954, the establishment of nursing courses was included in the school's regulations. In 1955, Edith de Magalhaes Fraenkel retired to Rio de Janeiro.

== International Council of Nurses ==
In 1953, Edith de Magalhães Fraenkel initiated and organized the 10th Nursing Congress of the International Council of Nurses (ICN) in Rio de Janeiro. The first code of professional ethics of the ICN in July 1953 was developed in "Enfermagem de São Paulo". Edith de Magalhães Fraenkel contributed significantly to this as dean of this school.

== Literature ==
- Amália Corrêa de Carvalho: Edith de Magalhães Fraenkel, 1980.
- Ernesto de Souza Campos: História da Universidade de São Paulo. 2. Auflage Edusp São Paulo, 2004, S. 414. Digitalisat
- Leopoldo Acuña: Carlos Ribeiro Justiniano Chagas. In: Wolfgang U. Eckart, Christoph Gradmann (Org.): Ärztelexikon. Von der Antike bis zur Gegenwart. 3. Auflage. Springer, Heidelberg 2006, S. 86.
- Taka Oguisso, Lucia Yasuko Izumi Nichiata: Edith de Magalhães Fraenkel, 2. Auflage FAPESP, São Paulo 2012.
- Taka Oguisso, Genival Fernandes de Freitas, Magali Hirmo Takasi: Edith de Magalhães Fraenkel: o maior vulto da Enfermagem brasileira. In: Revista de Escola de Enfermagem da USP, Band 47, Nr. 5, São Paulo 2013 Digitalisat
- Taka Oguisso, Lucia Yasuko Izumi Nichiata: Edith de Magalhães Fraenkel. In: Hubert Kolling (Org.): Biographisches Lexikon zur Pflegegeschichte, Who was who in Nursing History?". Band 8 hpsmedia Hungen 2018, S. 65 f.
