= Pamela Hibbs =

British nurse (1935 – 2021)

- Born: 1935
- Died: January 2021 (aged 85–86); University College London Hospital
- Occupation: nurse
- Employer(s): Hackney Hospital, City and Hackney Health Authority
- Known for: Her work on the prevention of pressure sores and her contribution to the planning and design of Homerton Hospital,
- Honours: CBE OBE FRCN

Pamela Hibbs (1935 – 2021) CBE OBE FRCN was a nurse leader and Chief Nursing Officer to the City and Hackney Health Authority, where she did notable work in planning and designing Homerton Hospital, and she was recognised for her achievements in the field of clinical nursing. She significantly improved standards in Hackney Hospital which at one point was seriously failing. A large amount of her work was around the area of pressure sore prevention, she used data to illustrate problems and enable prevention strategies.

== Early life and career ==
Born in 1935 and brought up in Kent, Wiltshire and Hampshire, Pamela Hibbs was the oldest of three children. Her mother had been a nurse and her father had worked in Fleet Street. She had a wartime childhood spent with aunts in Wiltshire. The family then relocated to Southampton. A local teacher introduced her to the history of St Bartholomew's Hospital, where she decided to take her nurse training. Hibbs began training as a cadet nurse at Southampton Eye Hospital and then took her general nurse training at St Bartholomew's Hospital, qualifying as a registered nurse with gold medal and first class honours for her year. Early in her post-qualification career she gained various clinical experience. This included work in the intensive care wards at St Mary's Hospital. Hibbs also took a year's course at Battersea College of Technology and qualified as a health visitor and worked in rural Berkshire. She returned to St Bartholomew's Hospital to be a ward sister and nursing officer, while also working as a night superintendent at St Leonard's Hospital.

== Further career ==
In 1976, Hibbs was seconded to Hackney Hospital to help improve a failing institution. She was appointed Divisional Nursing Officer Hackney Hospital responsible for acute, obstetric, mental illness, mental handicap and geriatric services, and remained at Hackney Hospital for eight years. Hibbs began by initiating improvements to the environment and particularly the needs of elderly patients. She made improvements including appointment of a Social Secretary devoted to the Care of the Elderly. This was achieved with a grant from The Mercer's Company, a livery company with links to St Bartholomew's Hospital. She addressed the high rate of pressure sores in the hospital which reduced from 25% to 2% by the time she retired in 1997.

Whist working at Hackney Hospital she took an Open University course and in 1978 was awarded a degree of bachelor of the arts.

Hibbs was appointed Chief Nursing Officer to the City and Hackney Health Authority in 1985, responsible for the quality assurance programme throughout the district. She was involved with Hackney Hospital until its closure, and instrumental in planning and designing the new Homerton Hospital which superseded Hackney Hospital.

In 1993, Hibbs was appointed Chief Nurse and Director of Quality Assurance at St Bartholomew's Hospital and the Royal London Hospital. She oversaw developmental programmes and practice development programmes. These were in particular areas of for care of the elderly, pain management and for the prevention of pressure sores.

== Contributions to the Quality of Clinical Care ==
In 1982, Hibbs argued with Mid Surrey District Health Authority Chairman that Budgets for the Elderly are unfairly calculated in comparison with budgets for acute wards.

In 1986, she was appointed to a working group to review and develop performance indicators. This was prompted by fear that standards of care were being overlooked by health service managers as they were less easy to quantify than patient throughput and cost efficiency. Hibbs draws a distinction between efficient and good care.

Hibbs was recognised particularly for her work on pressure sores. In 1987, she sat on a King's Fund Workshop to define prevalence and monitor costs of pressures sores. She presented a paper to the Kings Fund workshop relating to costs of pressure sores. She also published a book on managing patients at risk of developing pressure sores. Her work in achieving significant pressure ulcer reduction in City and Hackney Health Authority was acknowledged by peers in the same year. She continued research on Pressure Ulcer Prevention, publishing a paper in 1988 and joining a multi-disciplinary team to investigate the problem of high incidence of pressures sores in elderly patients admitted with fractured neck or femur in 1990. Systematic data collection on pressure sores was described as a prevention strategy and the work of the King's Fund Nursing Development Programme was acknowledged by the group.

In 1987, Hibbs investigated reports of differing nutritional standards in two wards caring for the elderly.

== Retirement ==
In 1997, Hibbs retired from her role as Chief Nurse and Director of Quality Assurance at the Royal Hospitals Trust, London. While in retirement Hibbs was active in Camden Health Watch and in the League of St Bartholomew's Nurses. In 2010 she was one of the judges of the Architects for Health Awards. She was Chair of St Joseph's Hospice and Chair of the Charity Council and Care which provides information and advice for the elderly. Hibbs was also involved in prison inspections participating as Specialist Inspector Nursing in 2000 during an unannounced follow up inspection of HM Prison Buckley Hall. She was a trustee of the Voluntary Board of Governors St Bartholomew's Hospital.

== Honours and awards ==
- Order of the British Empire in the New Year's Honours 1986.
- Fellowship of the Royal College of Nursing in 1990.
- Commander of the British Empire in 1996.
- Honorary Doctor of Science Degree awarded by City University 1996.

== Death ==
In January 2021 Pamela Hibbs died of COVID-19 while in University College London Hospital.

== Commemoration ==
On 6 May 2021, a tree was planted in the park in Camden in honour of Hibbs and other Camden residents who had died of COVID-19.

On 19 June 2021 The Times published a tribute describing Hibb's life and clinical achievements.

On 22 March 2022 the inaugural 'Pam Hibbs Lecture' was held by the Barts League of Nurses on the subject of pressure ulcer prevention during the pandemic. It featured talks from Ruth May and Jacqui Fletcher.

The book The Two Koreas and their Global Engagements by Andrew Jackson was dedicated to the memory of Hibbs.
