= Elizabeth Nichols =

American nurse (1821–1911)

Elizabeth B. Nichols
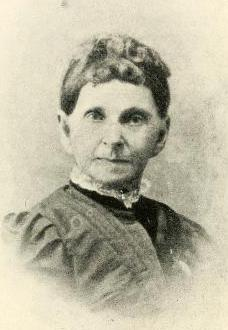
- Elizabeth Nichols, from 1897 publication.
- Born: 1821
- Died: 1911 (aged 89–90)
- Occupation: Nurse
- Known for: Union nurse
- Spouse: Stillman Nichols

Elizabeth B. Nichols (1821–1911), was a Union nurse during the American Civil War.

== Civil War service ==
Nichols began her wartime service when her husband was stationed in Chicago at the time, after being taken prisoner at Harper's Ferry, and was ill. Nichols arrived for service on October 17, 1862. After arriving at his regiment, Nichols became a field nurse, traveling throughout the east coast with the regiment, including service at Washington, D.C., Baltimore, Fairfax, and Gettysburg.

Nichols slept on the ground on piles of straw and dealt with numerous outbreaks of illnesses, such as typhoid fever and smallpox. "I have passed through scenes that I shall never forget," she wrote. Nichols served for about two years, the last sixteen months at the Invalid Corps camp near Washington, D.C., until her husband was discharged.

She wrote about her memories of war nursing in Mary A. Gardner Holland's Our Army Nurses (1897).

== Personal life ==
Elizabeth B. Nichols was married to Stillman Nichols.
