= Agnes Watt =

Agnes Jean Watt R.R.C.
- Born: 1859; Birmingham
- Died: 1946 (aged 86–87); Caterham on the Hill
- Education: The London Hospital
- Occupations: Civilian and Military Nursing Leader

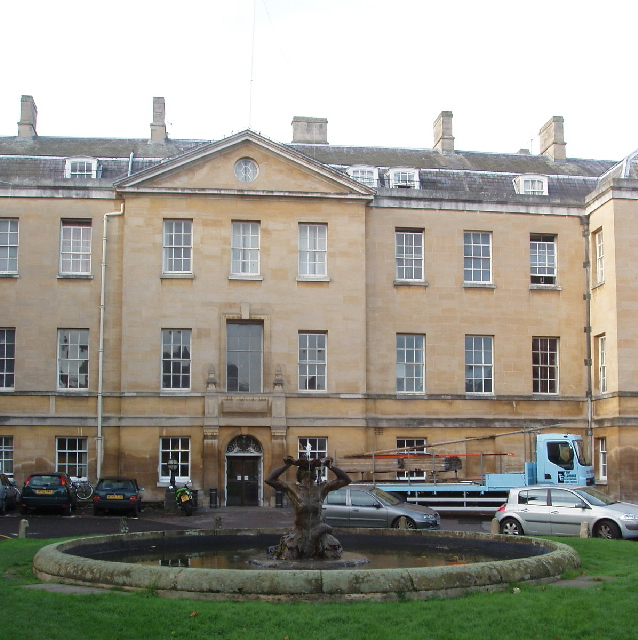
The Radcliffe Infirmary where Agnes Watt was matron

Agnes Jean Watt, RRC, (26 January 1859 – 31 July 1946) was an influential nurse leader who oversaw the introduction of modern Nightingale style nursing whilst she was matron of the Radcliffe Infirmary, and for over a decade was Principal Matron in the TFNS, of the 3rd Southern General hospital, Oxford, 1909–1922.

== Early life ==
Agnes Jean Watt was born on 26 January 1859 in Birmingham. She was the first of two children born to her father John Porteous Watt, a travelling salesman, and his wife Jane. Watt's mother died when she was 7 years old, and her father remarried three years later, and had one daughter, a half sister for Watt.

Watt was a governess in 1881, before she commenced nurse training.

== Early career ==
Watt commenced training at The London Hospital under matron Eva Luckes in September 1888. She was immediately appointed as a ward sister after she finished her training in 1890. In September 1892 she resigned because of problems at home, but returned the following year; initially as a holiday sister, and later she was promoted to ward sister again.

== Matronship ==
In 1897 Watt was keen to apply for the matronship of The Radcliffe Infirmary. Florence Nightingale had discussed the vacancy with Sydney Holland, Chairman of The London Hospital. With Holland and Eva Luckes's support, Watt was appointed Matron of the Radcliffe Infirmary, Oxford, in March 1897, having faced stiff opposition for the job; 64 other candidates had applied for the post. The nursing press believed that Watt faced a difficult challenge in modernizing the hospital. Despite the hospital's difficult financial situation Watt oversaw improvements to the nursing department, nurse training and nurses accommodation, and in 1909 finally ensured that her nurses were paid the same as at other hospitals. Watt was matron for nearly 25 years and retired in 1921.

== Military service ==
Whilst matron of the Radcliffe Infirmary Watt was appointed Principal Matron, TFNS, 3rd Southern General Hospital, Oxford in 1909. She held the post until 1922.

== Honours ==
In 1916 Watt received the Royal Red Cross from the King at Buckingham Palace with her colleague Anna Baillie.

== Retirement ==
When she retired Watt was presented with a gold watch and a cheque for £250 in recognition for her hard work at the infirmary. Lord Valentia said she 'Had occupied the most important position in the Infirmary and had fully justified the high reputation with which she came.' At the start of the Second World War Watt was living with her half sister in Coulsdon and Purley, Surrey. She died on 31 July 1946 in Caterham on the Hill, Surrey.
