= Richard Wells (nurse) =

British health care administrator (1941–1993)

Richard Wells FRCN
- Born: June 19, 1941
- Died: January 6, 1993 (aged 51)
- Occupation: nurse leader
- Known for: Shaping the nursing response to HIV infection and AIDS in the UK

Malcolm William James Richard Wells, FRCN (19 June 1941 – 6 January 1993), commonly known as Richard J. Wells, was a British nurse, nursing adviser and health care administrator. He was noted for being at the forefront of contributions to Aids nursing.

== Early life ==
Wells was born in South Africa during World War II. He spent time working in a family business in Leeds and then trained in psychiatric nursing.

== Career ==
Wells' career in nursing was largely based at the Royal Marsden Hospital, which he joined in 1977 and where he held various positions, including Director of the Marie Curie Rehabilitation Centre. He was awarded a Florence Nightingale fellowship to study in America in 1981.

Wells advocated for cancer patients to know their prognosis and supported the use of complementary therapies in holistic care.

He served as a consultant to a host of organizations, including the World Health Organization, the International Union Against Cancer, the International Council of Nurses and the European Oncology Society.

In the early 1980s, Wells helped to care for people with early cases of AIDS, including Terrence Higgins. He began to work with colleagues to lobby for awareness of HIV and Aids and improvements in care and was known for saying in regards to nursing that "if we get it right for Aids we've got it right for everybody".

As Oncology Nursing Adviser at the Royal College of Nursing, and as the first nurse member of the government expert advisory group on Aids appointed in 1985, Wells helped shape the nursing response to HIV infection and AIDS in the UK.

Wells featured in Bright Eyes, a documentary about Aids broadcast in 1984, as an expert on Aids and nursing. He travelled the UK to educate people about Aids, work to dispel "AIDS paranoia" and encourage people to use condoms to prevent the spread of Aids. Wells also discussed the problems faced by nurses with Aids and discrimination within the nursing profession.

Wells was made a Fellow of the Royal College of Nursing in 1987.

In 1991, Wells spoke of the possibility if a future where people with Aids might be rehabilitated, and publicly announced that he had Aids.

== Death and commemoration ==
Wells died as a result of complications from Aids in London in January 1993, with his long term partner Stephen beside him. He was remembered as an "Aids nursing pioneer".

In 1999, Wells was recognised as one of the Nursing Standard's "Nurses of the Millennium". An award in his name funded travel for a winning nurse to attend the Association of Nurses Aids Care Conference.

The Richard Wells Research Centre at West London University is named in his honour.

Ruth Sims, executive of Mildmay International, cited Wells as a key influence and supporter in her career.
