= Lucy Lincoln Drown =

American nursing educator (1848 – 1934)

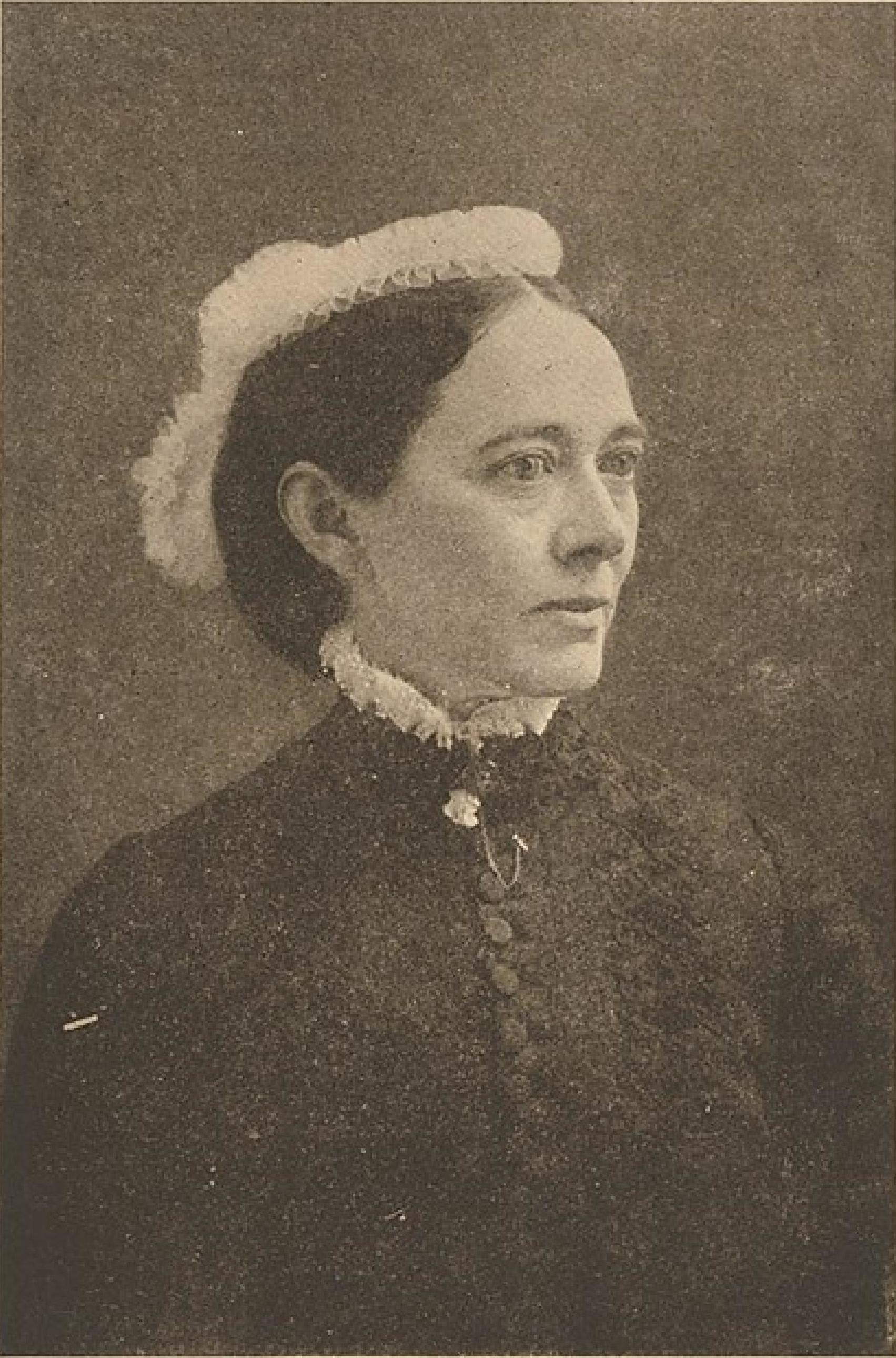
Lucy Lincoln Drown

Lucy Lincoln Drown (August 4, 1848 – June 21, 1934) was an American nursing educator. She was the superintendent of nurses at the Boston City Hospital from 1885 to 1910, which “made her a national figure in nursing”. She was one of the pioneers in nursing education in the US.

== Biography ==
Lucy Lincoln Drown was born on August 4, 1848, in Providence, Rhode Island, Northeastern United States. She spent her early life in Rhode Island and completed her school education at Salem Normal School in Massachusetts. She continued her higher education at the newly established nurse training school of the Boston City Hospital, in 1878, where she became one of its early graduates.

She started her professional career as a nurse at the Boston City Hospital and worked its different departments. She later became the superintendent of nurses at the Boston City Hospital, and held this position for a period of twenty five years. She was one of the founders of the Massachusetts Nurses Association. She also served as the treasurer of the American Society of Superintendents of Training Schools for Nurses, which was established in 1893.

To recognize her contributions in the field of nursing, the Massachusetts Nurses Association established the Lucy Lincoln Drown Nursing Historical Society, and instituted a Lucy Lincoln Drown Nursing History Award.

She died on June 21, 1934, of myocarditis.
