= Elinor D. Gregg =

American public nurse (1886 – 1970)

Elinor D. Gregg

Elinor D. Gregg (May 31, 1886 – March 31, 1970), also known as, Elinor Delight Gregg, Nurse Cross Red, was an American public nurse. She was one of the pioneers of industrial nursing. She established the public health nursing division in the American Bureau of Indian Affairs. She played an important role in taking public health nursing to the Native Americans.

== Early life and education ==
Elinor D. Gregg was born in 1886 in Colorado Springs, Colorado. She was one of the seven children of Rev. James Bartlett Gregg and Mary Needham Gregg. She completed her formal education in the Colorado Springs public schools. She attended grammar school, Cutler Academy, and Colorado College. In 1906, she continued her nursing education at the Waltham Training School for Nurses, Massachusetts.

== Early career ==
Following her graduation in 1911 from the Waltham Training School for Nurses, she started her career as an industrial nurse at the Boston Manufacturing Company, which built the world's first integrated spinning and weaving factory at Waltham, Massachusetts. During her tenure as an industrial nurse, she combined the nursing service with social and recreational activities. Between 1914 and 1915, she worked as an assistant superintendent of nurses at Cleveland City Hospital in Cleveland, Ohio. Meanwhile, she completed an institutional management course at Massachusetts General Hospital.

In 1915, she became the Superintendent of the Infant's Hospital in Boston, which was affiliated with the Training School for nurses of Peter Bent Brigham Hospital of Boston.

== Nursing at the war front ==
During her service at the Infant's Hospital, World War I began in Europe. She was assigned to Base Hospital 5 in Boston, which was also known as the Peter Bent Brigham Hospital Unit or the Second Harvard Unit. At the war front, she served as the Chief Nurse of the American Red Cross in Britain and in France.

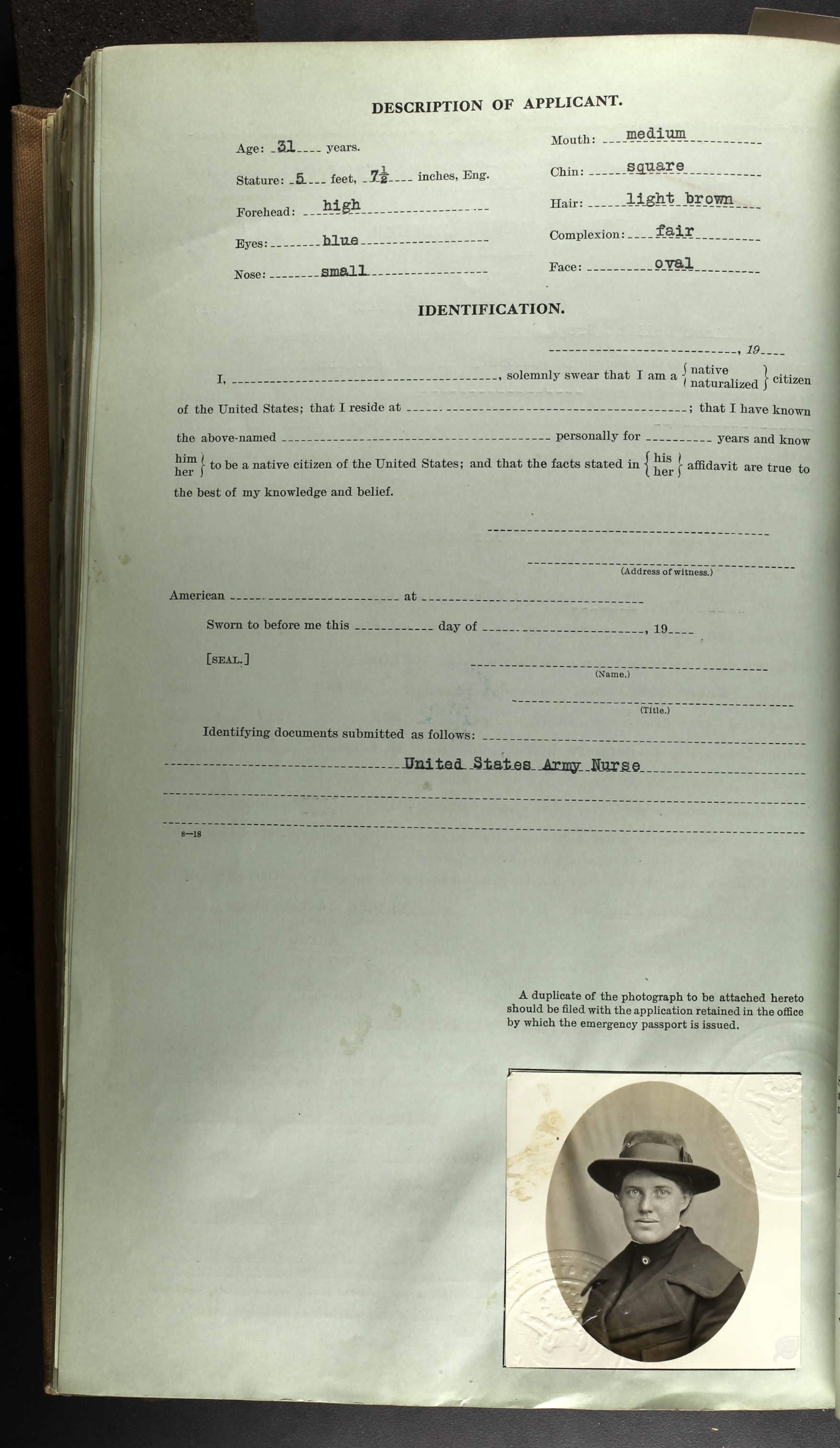
Elinor Delight Gregg, emergency passport application for nursing in France, 1917

== Serving Native Indians ==
In 1918, she left the Base Hospital No. 5 at the battlefields in France returning to Boston, Massachusetts. She extensively travelled the American West to share her war experiences. She later enrolled for a short term course on public health nursing at Simmons College in Boston.

In October 1922, she travelled to Washington, D.C., to meet Elizabeth Gordon Fox, who was the director of the Public Health Nursing Service for American Red Cross during and after World War I., for seeking employment opportunities. Fox asked her to work for the Native Indians to bring public health to the Lakota people of the Pine Ridge and Rosebud Reservations of South Dakota. Fox made this in a response to a request sent by Charles H. Burke, Commissioner, Bureau of Indian Affairs, who, in August 1922, asked the American Red Cross to support with public health nurses to serve the Native Americans. Fox also made similar offer to Augustine B. Stoll, an American Red Cross Nurse, to serve the people of Jicarilla Apache living near Dulce, New Mexico.

In November 1922, she began her position on the Rosebud Reservation and became one of the first public health nurses to be employed on an Indian reservation. She primarily focused in the areas of school nursing, infant and child welfare, controlling tuberculosis, treating trachoma, and sanitation.

Based on her performance, she was promoted as Supervisor of Field Matrons and Nurses in August 1924. She moved to Washington, D.C. where she reorganized the hospital nursing service, and established the public health nursing division in the Bureau of Indian Affairs, which became the forerunner of the nursing program in the Indians Health Services (IHS). Between 1924 and 1928, she interviewed several candidates for field nursing jobs on reservations.

She resigned on 16 November 1938. After her retirement, she was actively involved with the Maternal Health Center in Santa Fe, New Mexico.

== Death ==
She died, at the age of 83, on March 31, 1970, in Santa Fe, New Mexico, of respiratory arrest. She is buried in Section U of Santa Fe National Cemetery.
