= Thora Knudsen =

Danish nurse, women's rights activist and philanthropist

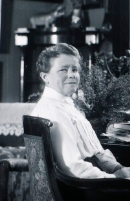
Thora Knudsen (1918)

Thora Alvilda Knudsen (1861–1950) was a Danish nurse, women's rights activist and philanthropist. She became an active member of the Danish Nurses' Organization from its establishment in 1899 and, campaigning for women's suffrage, was elected to serve as a member of the Copenhagen City Council (Borgerrepræsentation) in 1909 after women were permitted to participate in municipal elections. A frequent speaker at the meetings of the Danish Women's Society, she served on the board from 1911. As a philanthropist, she supported several relief organizations including the Diakonissestiftelsen and the Danish Red Cross.

== Biography ==
Born in Stærrede near Bisserup in north-western Zealand, Thora Alvilda Knudsen was the second of the three daughters of the farmer and local judge Harald Valdemar Fiedler (1808–1887) and Marie Sophie Kirstine Jensen (1830–1905). After working on and off as a teacher at the Tegneskolen for Kvinder from 1876 to 1886, together with her two sisters she decided to become a nurse, the up-and-coming profession for young ladies at the time.

After only nine months as an apprentice at Frederiks Hospital in Copenhagen, she applied for the post of head nurse of operations which led to employment in a primitive operating theatre until she was transferred to a ward with six colleagues. One of her patients was a member of the royal family which helped her later advancement.

In 1891, she married Morten Ole Knudsen, a reserve doctor at the hospital and retired from nursing but continued to be an active member of the Nurses' Organization. A keen proponent of women's suffrage, she was the leading candidate for the Conservatives in the 1909 municipal election, the first in which women could participate. She completed just one term as a member of the city council where she attempted unsuccessfully to serve as one of two citizens' representatives on the committee for the coming parliamentary elections. While some of her colleagues thought it was a good idea, she reported that one of them had stated that "women had absolutely no place there as they had no right to vote."

She was a frequent speaker at the Danish Women's Society, becoming a board member in 1911. Even after women were given the right to vote in 1915, she stressed the need for women to participate in public life and speak up at meetings. She believed that unless women became active, unfair treatment of the sexes would continue. In 1920, she was a candidate for Venstre but was unsuccessful.

As a philanthropist, she gave support to needy children, the sick and the elderly, and worked for the Deaconess' Foundation (Diakonissestiftelsen), the Red Cross, the Welander Home and the Society for the Fight against Sexual Diseases.

Thora Knudsen died on 23 January 1950 in Copenhagen.
