= Mabel Mary McCutcheon =

British-born Australian nurse

- Born: Mabel Mary Woolgar; 13 April 1886; Hangleton
- Died: 13 April 1886 (age 83); North Adelaide
- Other names: Mabel Mary Franks
- Occupation: nurse
- Spouse(s): Wilfred Henry Franks; Rev. Arthur McCutcheon

Mabel Mary McCutcheon MBE born Mabel Woolgar aka Mabel Mary Franks (13 April 1886 – 30 December 1942) was a British born Australian nurse who established health facilities at the Port Adelaide Central Methodist Mission which is now called UnitingSA.

== Life ==
McCutcheon was born in Sussex at Hangleton in 1885. Her parents were Jemima Florence (born Coles) and Alfred Woolgar. Her father was a skilled blacksmith. She qualified as a nurse and she then worked in London, Dublin and New York. When the First World War started she joined the Queen Alexandra's Imperial Military Nursing Service and she was posted to France, Egypt and Greece. In 1917 she married an Australian soldier named Wilfred Henry Franks and she became a War bride. By the time she arrived in Adelaide on board the SS Megantic in 1920 she had a baby daughter. The marriage however ended in divorce in 1922 and at about the same time she registered as a nurse in Australia. The same year she was employed as a matron and by 1925 she married a Methodist minister and social worker at the manse in Payneham, South Australia. She and Reverend Arthur McCutcheon had a son late that year.

In 1935 her husband began to lead the Port Adelaide Central Methodist Mission which had started in 1919. With Mabel's help it became an important resource occupying nine buildings in central Port Adelaide costing £120 a month to run. Mabel's contribution were based on her health background. One of her initiatives was to buy a ray machine foe £17 which she too around to her patients. Her approach included the supply of health foods including free apples, unpolished rice and barley, cracked wholewheat, vegetable juice and soya beans. She was interested in the endemic rheumatoid arthritis suffered by poor old people. In time the clinic employed skilled therapists in physiotherapy and chiropody. The clinic had the latest electrical devicies so that "healorays" could be used to alleviate symptoms. In 1939 her work was recognised when she became a Member of the Most Excellent Order of the British Empire.

By 1941 she was arranging for deprived families to have a break at a health camp that she had created at Mount Barker.

== Death and legacy ==
McCutcheon died in 1942 in North Adelaide. Her husband remarried. The mission named its clinic the Mabel Mary McCutcheon Memorial. The mission continued and in 2017 it changed its name to UnitingSA.
