= Mary Ward (nurse) =

BEM Mary Ward
- Born: Mary Ellen Holloway Amos Ward; 4 April 1884; Stoke Bruerne, England
- Died: 29 March 1972 (aged 87)
- Occupations: Nurse, midwife, amanuensis
- Years active: ?–1965 (retired)
- Known for: A significant figure in the history of the British canal system
- Notable work: Serving the boat people on the waterways

Mary Ellen Holloway Amos Ward, BEM (4 April 1884 – 29 March 1972) was an English nurse to the boat people on the waterways. She was a significant figure in the history of the British canal system.

== Biography ==
Ward was born on 4 April 1884, the daughter of rope and twine manufacturer Thomas Amos and Sarah Ellen Hollowell. The family life centred on her birthplace of Stoke Bruerne, one of the major junctions of the English canals. She was never professionally qualified as a nurse, but she spent ten years travelling as what was then called a "nursing sister" in convents in Europe and the USA before returning home to nurse her sick father. This brought her into contact with the boat families again, many of whom she had known when she was growing up. "People think my boat people are dirty and crude and want to get rid of them, but they are wonderful, proud, wise people".

She married Charlie Ward and, as her father's health declined, he took over the running of the family business. When this moved to a shed (formerly occupied by the stonemason) by the side of Lock 15, it became her surgery from where she administered medicine and care to the boat people. At first this was in an unofficial capacity and until the late 1930s she financed it from her own pocket. At this point the canal companies (precursors to British Waterways and then the Canal & River Trust) began to recognise the importance of her work and she was appointed as a "consultant sister" to long-distance boatmen and families. Over several decades she acted as nurse, midwife, and even amanuensis to the mostly uneducated, illiterate boat people.

She retired in 1965. She died seven years later in 1972 and was buried in the Baptist churchyard in Roade.

== Recognition ==
Ward was awarded the British Empire Medal in the 1951 New Year Honours. On 13 April 1959, she was the subject of the television programme This Is Your Life. Many of her friends from Stoke Bruerne attended the screening and a picture of this can still be seen hanging on the wall in the Boat Inn there. She was quoted as saying "You can't take me away from boat people. There isn't one of them wouldn't die for me, or one I wouldn't die for."

In 2013 the Canal Museum, run by the Canal & River Trust, hosted an exhibition on her life, sponsored by the University of Wolverhampton nursing faculty. The building from which she worked is now the Spice of Bruerne restaurant.
