= Helen Fairchild =

American nurse

- Born: November 21, 1885; Turbot Township, Pennsylvania, U.S.
- Died: January 18, 1918 (aged 32); France
- Occupation: Nurse

Helen Fairchild (November 21, 1885 – January 18, 1918) was an American nurse who served as part of the American Expeditionary Force during World War I, and who became known for her wartime letters to her family in the U.S., which vividly depicted the realities of combat nursing during World War I. She died of post-operative complications after surgery for a gastric ulcer while on duty with No. 10 U.S. Base Hospital on the Western Front.

== Biography ==
Helen was born in Turbot Township, Milton, in central Pennsylvania to Ambrose and Adda Dunkle Fairchild in 1885. She was the fourth of seven children and worked on the family farm in her earlier years. In 1913, Fairchild graduated from Pennsylvania Hospital and worked as a nurse. After the United States joined World War I, Fairchild and 63 other nurses from the hospital volunteered for the American Expeditionary Forces, joining U.S. Base Hospital No. 10 (also referred to as Pennsylvania Hospital Unit).

In May 1917, Fairchild sailed with her unit from New York to London, and traveled from there to Le Treport, arriving in June 1917. Since there were no U.S. forces in France yet by this time, the U.S. Base Hospitals occupied themselves by providing support to British and Dominion troops. Among other activities, Base Hospitals provided four-person teams consisting of a medical officer, a nursing sister, an anaesthetist, and an orderly to British Casualty Clearing Stations, mere miles from the front line. Fairchild volunteered for one such team during the Third Battle of Ypres and moved to (British) Casualty Clearing Station No. 4 near Dozinghem, by her own telling a hundred miles closer to the front than her parent unit. She served as a combat nurse and was exposed to heavy shelling including the use of mustard gas. On the night of 17 August, the casualty clearing station was bombed by German aircraft and the medical staff were evacuated back to Le Treport.

Fairchild had a medical history of abdominal pain, which worsened after her combat experience. By Christmas 1917 she was vomiting after every meal. X-rays revealed that a large gastric ulcer was obstructing her pylorus. She underwent surgery for the ulcer on January 13, 1918 at Canadian Stationary Hospital No. 3. At first she recovered well but then lapsed into a coma and died five days later. The post-mortem examination suggested that she died as a result of hepatic complications from the chloroform used as the anesthesia during her operation, possibly worsened by her previous exposure to mustard gas. According to a colleague writing her family, Fairchild had worsened her exposure by putting her own gas mask on a patient during the attack.

She was buried with full military honours in a cemetery in Le Treport and later shifted to Somme American Cemetery and Memorial in Bony, France.

=== Honors ===
The Nurses' Post of the American Legion in Philadelphia was named the Helen Fairchild Nurses' Post #412 in her honor. She is registered in the Women in Military Service for America Memorial at Arlington National Cemetery, Virginia.

The Watsontown, Pa., bridge was named the Nurse Helen Fairchild Memorial Bridge. It is an arched bridge over 1,000 feet long, over the West Branch of the Susquehanna River. It is on the National Trust for its construction and design.

A plaque on a stand is located in Belgium near the village of Westvleteren, not far from Poperinge. It stands just outside the wall of Dozinghem British Military Cemetery, the former location of Nurse Helen's Casualty Clearing Station No. 4 from June to November 1917. The plaque shows her portrait and gives her history in English and Dutch. The plaque was unveiled and placed in August 2010. The unveiling was attended by a number of high ranking Belgian and other officials, including a representative of the American Embassy and the villagers from West Vleteren.

== Legacy ==
In 2018, Fairchild was the subject of the short documentary Nurse Helen Fairchild: Killed in Action? directed by Eliciana Nascimento and produced by Daniel Bernardi with the collaboration of El Dorado Films and the Veteran Documentary Corps.
