= General Nursing Council =

Former healthcare regulators in the United Kingdom

- Successor: United Kingdom Central Council for Nursing, Midwifery and Health Visiting (UKCC)
- Established: Dec 1919
- Dissolved: 1983
- Chair: Sir Wilmot Herringham (1922-1925)
- Chair (1926-1944): Dame Ellen Musson

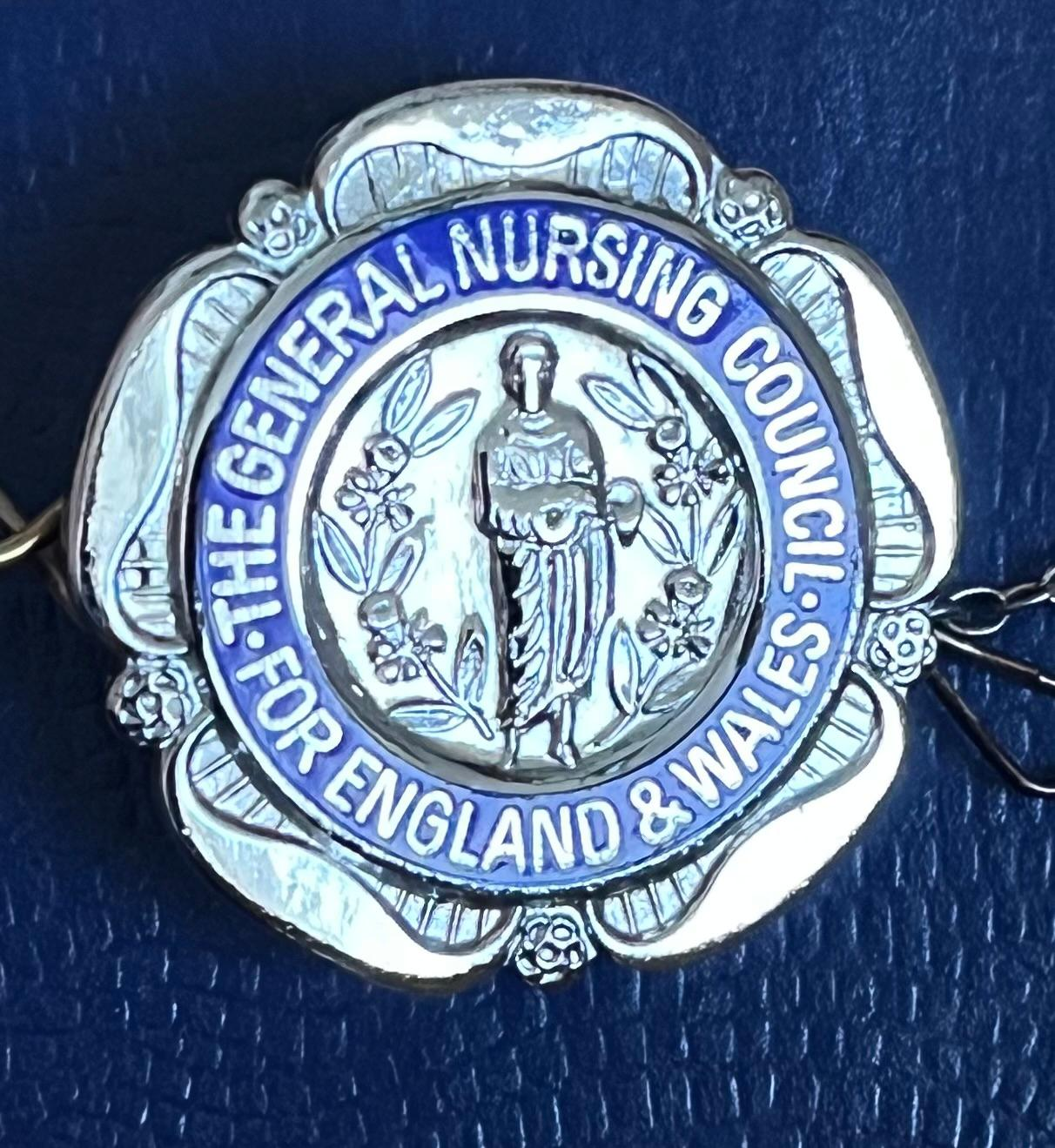
Badge for State Registered Nurses issued by the GNC

General Nursing Councils for England & Wales, Scotland, and Ireland were established by three country specific Nurses Registration Acts 1919. Each General Nursing Council (GNC) was responsible for deciding the rules for: admission to the register; for the conditions of training of nurses; for qualifying examinations, for discipline, and the uniform of badge of nurses on the register.

The composition of the first GNCs were to include: 2 appointees of the Privy Council (with no associations to medicine or nursing), 2 appointees of the Board of Education, 5 appointees of the Ministry of Health and 16 nurses to be appointed by the Minister of Health. The Acts stated that the first Councils' term should be no longer than three years and the subsequent 16 nurses' places were to be elected by nurses on the register.

== England and Wales ==
The Council was formed of 9 lay members and sixteen nurse members. 2 lay members were appointed by the Privy Council, 2 by the Board of Education and 5 by the Minister of Health. The nurses were initially appointed by the Minister. 11 were matrons or former matrons. 2 were from Workhouse infirmaries. 4 or 5 were members of the Royal British Nurses' Association, including Mrs Ethel Bedford-Fenwick and 9 from the College of Nursing, including Alicia Lloyd-Still. The first registrar was Miss Marion Scott Riddell RRC, who had previously been matron of the Chelsea Hospital for Women and principal matron in the Territorial Force Nursing Service.

It was decided that practicing nurses could be admitted to the register, which was opened in November 1921, if they had at least one year's training, and that they must apply by 14 July 1923. 3,235 applications were received in the first four months. Only 984 were approved because Mrs Bedford-Fenwick insisted on examining every case. 16 members of the Council resigned. The Minister had to intervene.

In 1922 elections were held for the nursing places on the council. 12,000 registered nurses were eligible to vote. 11 were elected by the general nurses (6 of these had to be matrons) and 5 from the supplementary registers for mental health nursing, paediatric nursing and male nurses. Mrs Bedford-Fenwick lost her seat. Sir Wilmot Herringham was appointed Chair (1922-5) and subsequently Vice-Chair (1926-1928). Dame Ellen Musson was subsequently Chair (1926-1944). Musson was followed by Miss D M Smith (1944-1955), Miss M J Smyth (1955-1960), Miss C A Smaldon (1960-1965) and Miss G E Watts (1965 ) as Chairs.

In June 1923, as the deadline for existing nurses to register approached, the House of Commons agreed a rule change proposed by William Chapple which permitted applicants to the general register to be admitted if they had worked as a nurse for at least three years before 1 November 1919. 40,451 applications were received.

In 1925 the first state examination was held and 4,005 nurses were admitted to the register by passing it.

The register of nurses had five parts: a general part with the names of all nurses who satisfied the rules for admission; a supplementary register for male nurses; a supplementary part for nurses trained to care for people with mental diseases; a supplementary part for nurses trained to care for children; and a supplementary part yet to be determined by the GNC.

== Ireland ==
The GNC for Ireland was established in 1920, with Edward Coey Bigger as Chair and Margaret Huxley as Vice Chair, members included Enid Browne, Countess of Kenmare, Sir Arthur Chance FRCSL, Colonel Taylor FRCSL, Alice Reeves, Miss O’Flynn, Miss Michie, RJ Johnson, PT O’Sullivan, Mary Bostock, Alphonsie M Curtin, Vera Matheson, Margaret Walsbe, and Mrs Blunden. The council was also referred to as the General Nursing Council for Southern Ireland and as Saorstat Eireann. There were some challenges with the move to Irish independence, as the registration logo and badge was soon no longer relevant in Ireland and a new design took some time to be agreed.

The GNC (Ireland) was reconstituted as the 'General Nursing Council for the Irish Free State', in 1929. The new Council was Chaired by Edward Coey Bigger and included Miss Halbert RGN, Miss Walsh RGN, Miss Smithson RGN, Miss Harold RGN, Miss Willis RGN, Dr Meenan, Dr MacBride, Dr Whitla, JJ Harding RMN, and the Registrar (W O’B Reidy). At this point the total number of nurses on the register was 5,087 (General, medical and surgical nurses 4,044; Mental nurses 902; Male nurses 3; Fever nurses 89; and Sick children’s nurses, 49).

The Nursing and Midwifery Board of Ireland (NMBI) was first established as An Bord Altranais (the Board) by the (Irish) Nurses Act 1950 to take over the functions of two bodies: the Central Midwives Board and the General Nursing Council, which had been established in 1918 and 1919, respectively.

== Later years and replacement ==
The responsibilities of the GNCs in each of the countries were extended by the Nurses Act 1943, to include a register for assistant nurses (later state enrolled nurses).

Dorothy Smith was vice-chair of the GNC from 1939 until 1944 when she was elected chair. During her 11 year tenure Smith only missed one meeting out of 134; she retired in 1955.

Following recommendations of the Briggs Report and the passing of the Nurses, Midwives and Health Visitors Act 1979, the GNC, the Central Midwives Board in London and seven other bodies.were disbanded and replaced with United Kingdom Central Council for Nursing, Midwifery and Health Visiting (UKCC) in 1983.

== Notable council members and staff ==
The GNC council members were selected from the most influential nurses in the United Kingdom, alongside prominent members of the public appointed by the government. Amongst them were the following, with their GNC dates given where known.

GNC England and Wales

The Board included the following (with dates of office where known): Harriet Alsop (1923-1932); Geraldine Bremner; Isabel Graham Bryce (c.1950); Letitia Clark (c.1930); Dorothy Coode (1923-1927); Gertrude Cowlin (1923-c.1931 representing general trained nurses); Rachael Cox-Davies (c.1923-c.1937); Ruth Darbyshire (elected general member 1933-7 , vice chairman 1934-7), Helen Dey 1933-1950. Henry Gooch (c.1937); Lucy Duff Grant (1937-1955); Wilmot Herringham (Chair 1922-1926); Euphemia Steele Innes (c.1925); Gwendoline Kirby (1955–1965, representing Sick Children's Nurses); Emily MacManus (1933-); Frederick Menzies (c.1937); Ellen Musson (c.1923-1943; Chair 1926-1943); Zena Elsie Oxlade (Chair to 1984); Kathleen Raven (c.1950); Cathlin Cecily du Sautoy; Catherine A Smaldon CBE (Chair 1960-1965); Dorothy Smith (Vice Chair 1939-1944, Chair 1944-1955); Ellinor Smith (1920-c.1926); Margaret J Smyth CBE (Chair 1955-1960); Margaret Elwyn Sparshott (1920-1940); Alicia Lloyd Still (1920-1937); Susan Villiers (1920-1937, representing Fever Nurses); Grace Elizabeth Watts (Chair 1965-1973); Beatrice Brysson Whyte (1965-) Maude Eve Wiese (c.1923-c.1940, representing Mental nurses); Charlotte Seymour Yapp (1920-1925 representing Poor Law nurses).

GNC Scotland

Celeste Bowe (c.1970); Thomas Ferguson (medical doctor) (Chair, c.1930); Annie Warren Gill (c.1920); Elizabeth Haldane (1928-); Margaret Currie Neilson Lamb (1960-c.1964); Edward McCombie McGirr (c.1978); John MacLeod (solicitor) (Chair 1921-1946); Mary McAlister (c.1955); Nora Milnes (1922-); Barbara Quaile (c.1950).

GNC for Ireland (from 1922 'for Northern Ireland')

Edward Coey Bigger (c.1920); Alice Reeves and Margaret Huxley wrote the first rules for the GNC for Ireland in the 1920s; Anne Elizabeth Musson (1922-c.1946) sat on the Council and represented the Council on a number of bodies including the Queen's Nursing Institute.

Supporting Committees

Rosalie Dreyer (1943 appointed to the GNC Assistant Nurses Committee);

Staff England & Wales

Margaret Rosemary Briggs, (Education Officer to 1982); Renate Burgess (clerical 1952-1962); Audrey Lilian Coleman, (General Administrative Officer to 1983); Margaret Cooper (Chief Education Officer, 1974-1982); Gladwys Evelyn Davies (Registrar, c.1939); Barbara Fawkes (Chief Education Officer, 1959-1974); Marjorie Gardener (inspector of GNC approved nurse training schools from 1964); Betty Nicolas (Inspector from 1958; Education Officer from 1970); Sue Pembrey (c.1970); Nancy Roper (examiner c.1955); Maude Storey (1977–1981); Marjory Warren examiner c.1950);

Staff Scotland

Jessie Gunn Miller Main, (Registrar c. 1976).

== See also ==
- Nursing and Midwifery Council
- United Kingdom Central Council for Nursing, Midwifery and Health Visiting
- Nursing in the United Kingdom
- History of nursing in the United Kingdom
- List of nursing organisations in the United Kingdom
- Royal College of Nursing
- Royal College of Midwives
- Maternity in the United Kingdom
