= Margaret Currie Neilson Lamb =

Scottish nurse and Council chair (1907–1991)

Margaret Currie Neilson Lamb FRCN
- Born: 1907; Kincardine-on-Forth, Fife, Scotland
- Died: 1 July 1991 (aged 83–84); Royal Victoria Hospital, Edinburgh, Scotland
- Education: Harris Academy
- Alma mater: University of London; University of Chicago
- Occupation: Nurse
- Employer(s): Dundee Royal Infirmary; Royal College of Nursing
- Organization: General Nursing Council
- Known for: First nurse to be Chair of the General Nursing Council in Scotland

Margaret Currie Neilson Lamb FRCN (1907–1991) was the first nurse to chair the General Nursing Council in Scotland.

== Career ==
Lamb was born in Kincardine-on-Forth in Fife in 1907, her father was in the army and died when she was a child. Her mother later moved the family to Dundee where she remarried and Lamb spent her childhood, attending the Harris Academy until she was 15. She had wanted to become a teacher but could not afford to, so worked towards becoming a sister tutor instead.

Lamb trained as a nurse at the Dundee Royal Infirmary, registering in 1934. She worked as a staff nurse in the Dundee Royal Infirmary before training as a midwife, qualifying in Dundee and registering as a midwife in 1936.

She then became a night sister in the Randolph Wemyss Memorial Hospital Buckhaven, Fife, which at that time was local colliery hospital. Her next post was at the Barshaw Hospital, Paisley where she gained midwifery experience. She then went to the Southern General Hospital, Glasgow as a Sister Tutor where she stayed until 1946. Initially she was not qualified as a Nurse Tutor, but gained a Diploma in Nursing from University of London via a correspondence course, and subsequently became Principal of the Southern's nursing course.

Lamb became Assistant Secretary of the Royal College of Nursing (RCN) Scottish Board at the end of 1946 and was living in Edinburgh. In 1950 she began to develop the RCN Scotland educational activities.

In 1952 Lamb took a study break from the RCN where she had become Secretary to the RCN Scottish Board. Lamb went to the University of Chicago as Scotland's first Rockefeller fellow. She spent 15 months there and was awarded the Certificate of Academic studies in Sociology at the University of Chicago.

In 1955 Lamb's work on developing nurse education was recognised when she was appointed Education Officer of the Scottish Board of the Royal College of Nursing. She featured prominently in the negotiations which led to the inception of the Nursing Studies, University of Edinburgh in 1956. She was a member of the Steering Committee for the Experiment in Nurse Training conducted at Glasgow Royal Infirmary from 1956 to 1961. Lamb was also a member of the Nursing and Midwifery Sub-Committee of the South-Eastern Regional Hospital Board, Edinburgh and as a member of the Board of Management for Edinburgh Northern Hospitals.

Lamb became a member of the General Nursing Council in 1960 and its Vice Chair in 1963. In 1964 Lamb became the first nurse to become Chair of the General Nursing Council in Scotland.

In 1964 Lamb was a member of the influential Platt Committee on Nursing Education, led by Harry Platt which published in 1964 and 1965. Lamb retired from the RCN in 1966.

In 1976 Lamb was in the first cohort to be awarded Fellowship of the Royal College of Nursing, FRCN, alongside nursing luminaries Barbara Fawkes, Catherine Hall (nurse), Winifred Hector, Jean McFarlane, Baroness McFarlane of Llandaff, Doreen Norton, Juanita Bennett Rule OBE, Hilda Marjorie Simpson, and Elizabeth Elaine Wilkie.

Lamb died in the Royal Victoria Hospital, Edinburgh, on 1 July 1991.
