= Rosalie Dreyer =

Swiss-born naturalised British nurse and administrator

- Born: 3 September 1895; Bern, Switzerland
- Died: 21 May 1987 (aged 91); London, England
- Occupation: nurse
- Years active: 1922–1964

Rosalie Dreyer (3 September 1895 – 21 May 1987) was a Swiss-born naturalised British nurse and administrator. Immigrating to England at the age of eighteen, she trained as a nurse in London and worked her way through the ranks to become matron, principal matron and chief matron-in-charge of the Nursing Service of the London County Council. Dreyer was a pioneer in the development of Britain's public-funded nursing service.

== Early life ==
Rosalie Dreyer was born on 3 September 1895 in Bern, Switzerland to Elisabeth (née Neuenschwander) and Johann Dreyer. She was the oldest of four daughters and her father managed a dairy co-operative. Though Lutheran, after receiving her basic education from a school run by Catholic nuns, Dreyer traveled to England in 1914 as a nanny to a Swiss family who had settled abroad. In 1934, Dreyer became a naturalized British citizen.

== Early nursing career ==
Dreyer entered nurse training in 1918 at Guy's Hospital of London and earned her state registration certificate in 1922. Dreyer worked for a year as private nurse before returning to Switzerland in 1923 to work at the Rollier Clinic, a tubercular hospital in Leysin. She returned to England in 1924 and resumed work at Guy's Hospital, qualifying as a midwife in 1926 and working in a number of staff nurse and sister posts. In 1931 she was appointed assistant matron to matron Emily MacManus CBE, a noted leader of the nursing profession.

== Later Nursing Career ==
In 1934 Dreyer was appointed matron for Bethnal Green Hospital, a municipal hospital under the administrated of the London County Council (LCC). Dreyer was appointed a principal matron in 1935 under Dorothy Bannon, Matron-in-Chief for all LCC municipal hospitals. On Bannon's death in 1940, Dreyer was made Matron in Chief. The LCC had 77 hospitals with 37,000 beds and 20,000 staff and was described at the time as the 'largest municipal hospital organisation in the world'. Up until 1929 these hospitals had been workhouses under the Poor law Guardians. The LCC did not contract nurses for specific facilities, but rather, contracted nurses to their centralized system, giving Dreyer charge of all 11,000 nurses under contract to the LCC. During her tenure, Dreyer managed the often difficult process of improving the status and professionalism of the nursing profession without becoming aligned with the politics of her employers. Dreyer was instrumental in improving the training for nurses in the hospitals and improving recruitment of nurses through creating part-time jobs and employing married women.

=== World War II ===
At the outbreak of World War II in 1940, Dreyer was promoted to principal matron in charge as the LCC hospital and district medical services were mobilised to receive civilians wounded in air raids. This appointment attracted xenophobic attention of Ethel Bedford Fenwick who denounced Dreyer as being of 'German blood'; forcing Dreyer to make public statements of denial and gaining the public support of the Royal College of Nursing (RCN) and the leader of the LCC, Charles Latham.

During the war all 98 LCC hospitals suffered bomb damage. Dreyer was instrumental in assessing the damage and organising evacuations of patients, staff and services and their return. During the war, with the increased need for staff, Dreyer had to make difficult decisions as to whether nurse training or serving the public was the imperative. In 1941 She was an appointed member of the RCN Nursing Reconstruction Committee: chairman Lord Horder. This committee made recommendations on the training and qualifications of a new the assistant nurse (later known as the enrolled nurse), recruitment of nurses and education for registered nurses. Dreyer introduced training for assistant nurses into LCC hospitals in 1942 on the model recommended by the Horder Committee. In 1943 the Minister for Health, Ernest Brown, appointed Dreyer to the Assistant Nurses Committee of the General Nursing Council

Dreyer's managerial skills in leading large scale nursing services in war were widely recognized and utilised in other arenas. In 1943 She was appointed to the Colonial Office's Committee of inquiry into the training of nurses to work in the British Colonies;chairman Lord Rushcliffe. In 1944 she was appointed to the United Nations Relief and Rehabilitation Administration Committee to advise on problems of demands for nurses for relief work in the territories of Europe as they were liberated.

=== 1948 onwards ===
In 1948 the National Health Service (NHS) was created, taking all voluntary and municipal funded hospitals into its administration. Local Authorities retained administration only of their domiciliary and community health services:including district nurses and midwives, health visitors and school nurses. At a public event at County Hall to mark the commencement of the NHS, Herbert Morrison, then leader of the LCC, singled Dreyer out for special tribute. Dreyer remained in the LCC as Chief Nursing Officer of the domiciliary and nursing services, losing her involvement with the hospitals. She retired from the LCC in 1950. The occasion was marked by a presentation of a cheque, said to be one of the largest in the history of the LCC, by Sir Allen Daley, the County Medical Officer of Health.

From 1950-53 Dreyer worked as the World Health Organisation's advisor in Europe, advising on the reconstruction of nursing services.

She was the first president of the National Association of State Enrolled Nurses from 1954.

She continued her senior level involvement with London NHS hospitals through appointments to their boards of management: South West Middlesex Hospital (1950–1958); Stepney Hospital (1952–64); Lewisham Hospital (1955-74, including as vice-chairman 1967-74 ). Dreyer was also a governor of the Royal National Ear, Nose and Throat Hospital.

Throughout her career, Dreyer was a life member of the RCN and was president of the South East London branch.

== Death and legacy ==
Dreyer died from a brain tumor on 21 May 1987 at her home in Wimbledon, London. She is noted, along with her predecessor, Bannon, as a pioneer in creating the public-funded nursing service in Britain.
