= Charlotte Elizabeth McManus =

Irish nationalist, historian and novelist

- Born: about 1850; Kiltimagh, County Mayo, Ireland
- Died: 5 October 1944; Kiltimagh, County Mayo, Ireland
- Other name: L. McManus
- Occupations: Writer, historian, political organizer
- Relatives: Emily MacManus (niece); Cooper Perry (brother-in-law)

Charlotte Elizabeth McManus (about 1850 – 5 October 1944) was an Irish nationalist, historian and novelist. Her family name sometimes appears as MacManus in sources. She was known as Lil and Lottie, and published as L. McManus.

== Early life and education ==
McManus was born in Kiltimagh (some sources give Castlebar), County Mayo, the daughter of James McManus and Charlotte Elvira McManus. McManus was educated at home and in Torquay. Her brother Leonard Strong McManus was a physician, and her sister Caroline married Sir Edwin Cooper Perry, a physician and medical educator. Hospital matron Emily MacManus was her niece, and writer Dermot MacManus was a nephew.

== Career ==
In midlife, McManus became ardent nationalist and a Gaelic League worker in Kiltimagh, County Mayo. Due to her work it is believed up to 7000 people attended a nationalist meeting in the area in 1909. She was on the anti-Treaty side of the Civil War in Ireland. She wrote for Penny Pamphlets, published in the Educational Company of Ireland series, and wrote articles for the Irish Independent. Her novel The Professor in Erin (1918) was serialized in the Sinn Féin newspaper, and uses an alternate world scenario to depict "such an Ireland as might have existed had the battle of Kinsale resulted differently, and if Ireland had not been subjected to the plantations that followed that battle". She also contributed chapters to the Seumas MacManus book The Story of the Irish Race (1921).

== Death and legacy ==
McManus died in Kiltimagh in 1944, in her nineties. In 1954 her novel Nuala was translated into Irish by Gearoid Mac Spealáin.

== Works ==
=== Novels ===
- Amabel: A MIlitary Romance ( London: T. Fisher Unwin 1893)
- The Red Star (NY: G. P. Putnam's Sons 1895), Do. (London: T. Fisher Unwin 1896)
- The Silk of the Kine (London: T. Fisher Unwin 1896), rep. as Silk (NY: Harper 1896)
- Lally of the Brigade (London: T. Fisher Unwin; Boston: L. C. Page 1899; Dublin: Sealy, Bryers & Walder 1902)
- Nessa (Dublin: Sealy, Bryers Walker 1902)
- The Wager (NY: F. M. Buckles 1902)
- In Sarsfield’s Days: A Tale of the Siege of Limerick (Dublin: M. H. Gill 1906)
- Nuala: The Story of a Perilous Quest (Dublin: Browne & Nolan 1908)
- The Professor in Erin (Dublin: M. H. Gill 1918)

=== Stories ===
- "The Fish", "A Counter Reprisal" and "The Warrior" (Banba, 1921)
- Within the Four Seas of Fola (Dublin: M. H. Gill 1922)

=== Plays ===
- O'Donnell's Cross (1907)

=== Autobiography ===
- White Light and Flame: Memories of the Irish Literary Revival and the Anglo-Irish War (Dublin; Cork: Talbot 1929)
