= Anne Elizabeth Musson =

- Born: 1881; West Bridgford
- Died: 1958 (aged 76–77); Antrim
- Occupation: Nurse
- Employer: Royal Victoria Hospital, Belfast
- Organization: Royal College of Nursing

Anne Elizabeth Musson (c.1884-1958), MBE, ARRC, best known as Matron of the Royal Victoria Hospital, Belfast (1922-1946).

Anne Elizabeth Musson was born in West Bridgford, Nottingham, in 1881, her mother was Anne.

== Training and early career ==
Musson trained as a nurse at Nottingham General Hospital 1904-1907, where she subsequently held posts including sister and night superintendent. She also trained at the City of London Lying-in Hospital in 1909 where she gained her certificate in midwifery.

Musson gave her home address as being in West Bridgford, Nottingham until at least 1922, whilst she moved around the country to pursue more senior posts. These included Sister posts at the Hospital for Diseases of the Throat in Golden Square London, and at the King Edward VII Hospital (later known as Cardiff Royal Infirmary). In 1913 Musson was appointed Housekeeper and Assistant Matron at the Royal Gwent Hospital in Newport, Wales.

== First world war ==
During the First World War Musson joined the Territorial Force Nursing Service (TFNS), initially at the 3rd Western Hospital, which was head-quartered at Cardiff Royal Infirmary.

She then served with the British Expeditionary Force (World War I) in France from 22 October 1914. She joined TFNS staff in Rouen, where she worked in base hospitals, and at casualty clearing stations (CCS). She was then placed in charge of the transfer of patients in ambulance trains. In 1917 she was mentioned in despatches and remained in France for four and a half years.

She stayed involved with the TFNS after the war; in June 1928 she was listed as Matron, 3rd Western General Hospital for the TFNS. The 3rd Western General Hospital was disbanded in 1919 but retained a section located in Dumfries Place, Cardiff.

In 1918 she was made an Associate Member of the Royal Red Cross (ARRC), also known as a 'Royal Red Cross medal 2nd class', in recognition of her service.

== Royal Victoria Hospital ==
In 1919 Musson moved to Belfast where she became Assistant Matron at the Royal Victoria Hospital. In 1922 she was promoted to Matron of the Royal Victoria Hospital, taking over from Miss Bostock (RRC). It was a post Musson held until her retirement in 1946.

In 1927 Musson became the first President of the Royal Victoria Hospital Student Nurses' Association (the first Irish branch of the SNA), in recognition of her work to create and support the Association. She returned as guest of honour to celebrate the Association's 21st birthday in 1948. Musson was similarly supportive in the creation of the Royal Victoria Hospital League of Nurses.

In 1931 Musson asked if a nurses badge could be commissioned for qualifying staff. A green and silver oval badge was designed by the well known sculptor Rosamond Praeger.

Musson presided over the building of a new nurses home which opened in 1939. This homed 223 nurses, with a kitchen, dining rooms, sitting rooms, libraries and modern bedrooms and bathrooms. It also housed a teaching unit with a lecture theatre, a demonstration area (with all the current medical apparatus, space for chemistry work and for nutrition demonstrations) and offices for the Sister Tutors. Importantly the nurses' home connected to the main hospital via covered walkways to protect the nurses from the rain. In 1950 the Nurses Home was renamed 'Musson House', as a tribute for her years of service as matron of the hospital and her work in planning the home.

After retiring as Matron Royal Victoria Hospital in 1946 she was appointed a Member of the Order of the British Empire (MBE) for her services to nursing in Northern Ireland 1949.

== Representing nurses ==
Throughout her career Musson was actively involved in organisations that represented nurses and which sought to develop the nursing profession. She often became the representative for nursing in Northern Ireland.

=== Royal College of Nursing ===
In 1917 Musson became a founding member of the Royal College of Nursing as member 4325, joining their campaign for the state registration of nurses. Musson was elected a member of the RCN Irish Board in 1920. She was actively involved in the foundation of the RCN Belfast Branch 1921-1922, and later was the founding Chair of the Northern Ireland Committee 1943-1944. She was a member of the Council of the Royal College of Nursing from 1925-1926, 1930-1945. In July 1945 she received a vote of thanks on her retirement from Council.

In 1943, following the Nurses Salaries Committee, the Ministry of Health, Stormont, reviewed the implementation of their recommendations in Northern Ireland. The minister brought together representatives from the British Hospitals Association, Rate-aided Hospitals’ Association and the Royal College of Nursing to discuss a plan. Musson was one of the five RCN representatives. The RCN representatives discussed the pending Nurses Act 1943 which was being discussed by Parliament, and sent the following telegram to the Ulster MPs at Westminster: “Royal College of Nursing Belfast Branch urgently solicits your support for Nurses Bill with important addition that nursing be made a closed profession.”

Musson remained involved with the RCN after her retirement and was actively involved in supporting the success of the Northern Ireland Appeal Fund of the Royal College of Nursing 1949-1955.

=== General Nursing Council ===
Musson was in the early cohort of matrons and nurses who registered with the General Nursing Council. She was the 2159th nurse to join the state register in February 1922, just six months after applications opened. Later that year, in September 1922, Musson was appointed to the first General Nursing and Midwives Council for Northern Ireland, later called the Joint Nursing and Midwives’ Council for Northern Ireland. Musson served from 1922-1945 to 'represent registered nurses in Northern Ireland'. Her appointment including a period as Vice-Chair. The first Council established the rules and regulations governing the training, examination and registration of qualified nurses - the standard that nurses had to meet to become successful in joining the state register of nurses. Musson was actively involved in this process.

Musson also acted as a representative of the General Nursing Council. At a special meeting of the Joint Committee on 30th January 1939, Musson and Miss MA Beaton were appointed to represent the Joint Council on the National Services Committees to be set up in Northern Ireland. For 18 years Musson was elected to represent the General Nursing Council on the Queen's Institute of District Nursing on their Northern Ireland Executive Committee. And Musson was one of five representatives for the Joint Nursing and Midwives Council for Northern Ireland on the Assistant Nurses’ Committee set up by the Ministry of Health and Local Government, Stormont, Belfast, constituted under Section 3 (1) of the Nurses Act (Northern Ireland), 1946.

=== Other ===
In June 1929 she joined 23 nurses on the SS Letitia travelling to the International Congress of Nurses for Montreal, hosted by the International Council of Nurses. The Letitia was just one cohort from the UK representing the National Council of Nurses of the United Kingdom, the Congress attracted some 7,000 nurses from across the world.

== Death and Legacy ==
Musson was a keen artist and a frequent exhibitor at the Ulster Academy of Arts.’ She ensured that artworks were displayed throughout the new Royal Victoria Hospital Nurses' Home. She also donated many of her paintings to be sold for RCN fundraising.

Musson died on 3 February 1958 at Holywell Hospital after a long illness. She was survived by her sister Florence Curtis Musson. Her probate valued her effects at £3764 15s. 2d.

Her medals and awards (MBE, ARRC, 1914 Star, British War and Victory Medals, Jubilee 1935) are now held by the National Museums Northern Ireland.
