= Bethnal Green Hospital =

Former hospital in London, England

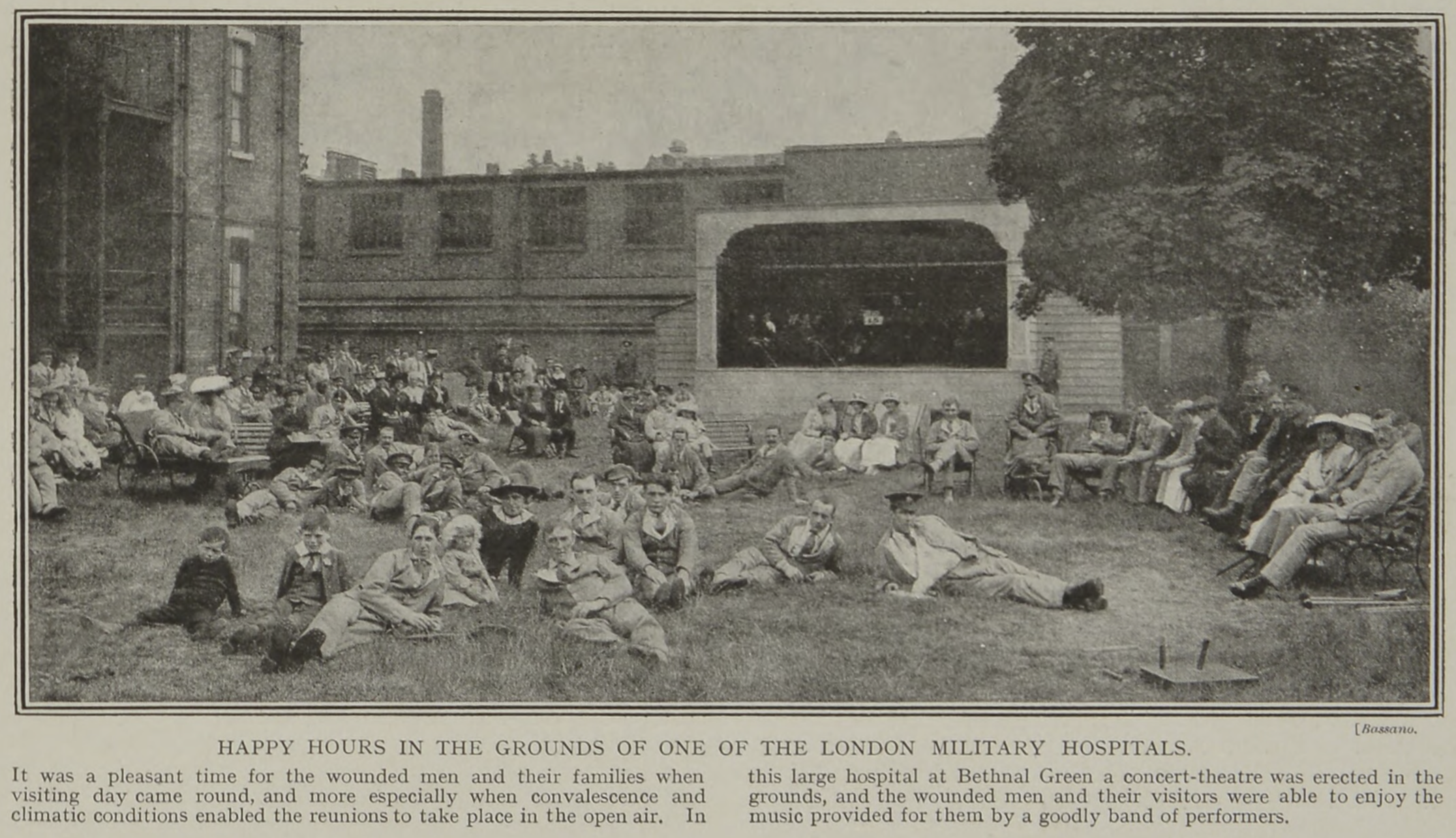
- Patients and visitors at a concert in the hospital grounds c.1917

Geography
- Location: Bethnal Green, London, England

History
- Founded: 1900
- Closed: 1990

Bethnal Green Hospital was an acute care hospital, in Bethnal Green in the London Borough of Tower Hamlets, England. It opened in 1900, and it closed in 1990.

== History ==
Bethnal Green Hospital was initially opened as the local workhouse infirmary on Cambridge Heath Road, Bethnal Green in 1900. The 750 bed infirmary was designed by Giles Gough and Trollope and had eleven pavilion style ward blocks. The new infirmary was built on a 4.5-acre site purchased from the London Society for Promoting Christianity amongst the Jews. The site had contained the Episcopal Jews' Chapel and was known as Palestine Place. When the chapel was demolished the clock was incorporated into the tower of the new infirmary's administration block.

During the First World War the hospital became a military hospital between 1915 -1920. The Commanding Medical Officer was Colonel E. Hurry Fenwick, a doctor at The London Hospital, and one of Ethel Fenwick's brother in laws. The London County Council took over the hospital in 1930. During the Second World War the hospital had minor bomb damage. In 1948 the NHS took over the management of the hospital which was renamed as Bethnal Green Infirmary.

The hospital went through a series of changes before closing in 1990. The remaining care of the elderly patients and staff were transferred to the newly opened Bancroft Unit for the Care of the Elderly at Mile End Hospital, part of the Royal London Hospital, and now Barts Health NHS Trust.

Today the site has been redeveloped by the Victoria Park Housing Association with all but the listed Administration Block being pulled down.

== Notable staff ==
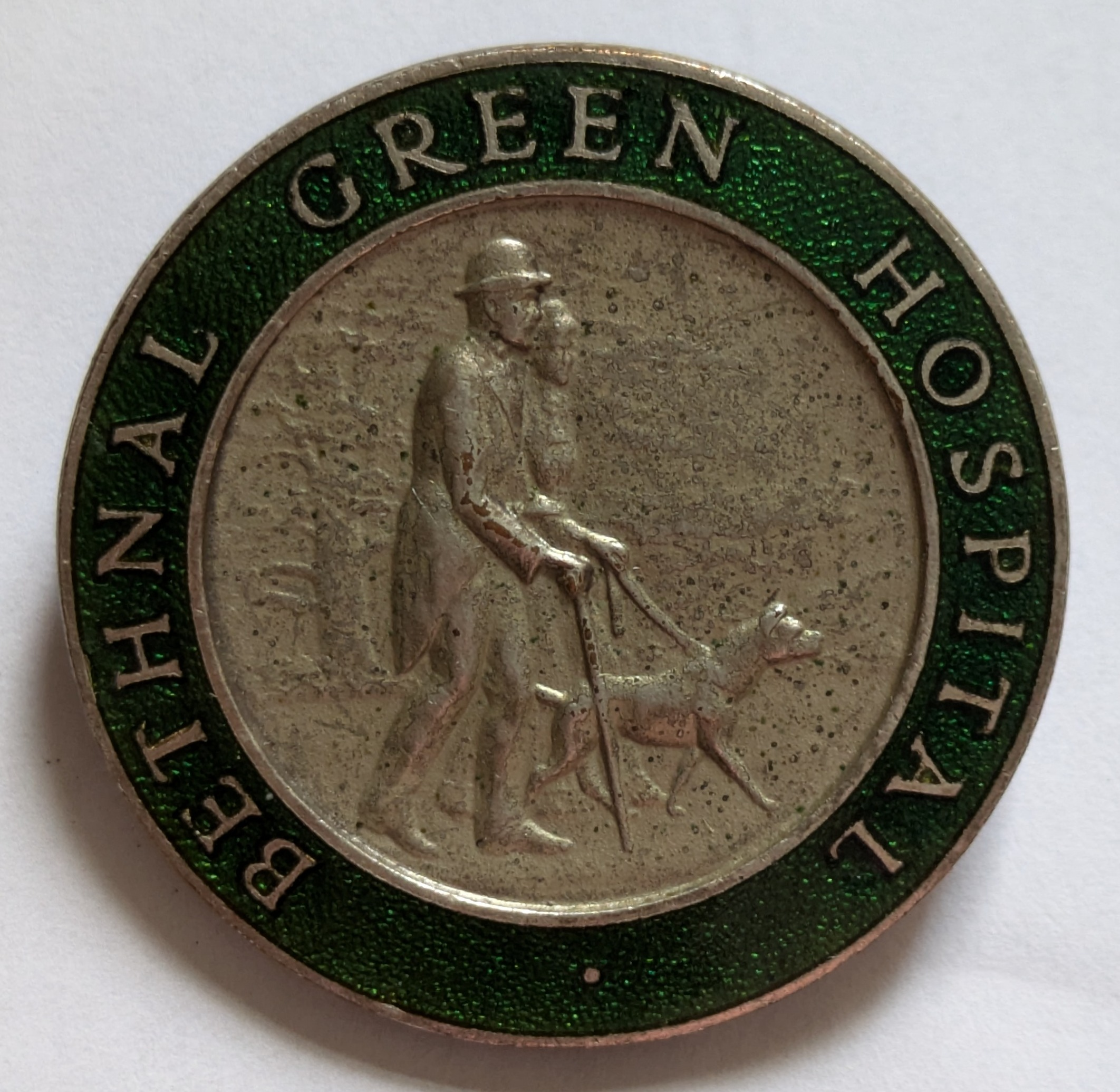
Bethnal Green Hospital nurses badge

- Elizabeth Dodds, RRC (1872-1944), Assistant Matron, Bethnal Green Infirmary 1903, and Matron 1903–1933. Dodds trained at The London Hospital under Eva Luckes between 1897 – 1899. After her training she worked on the hospitals' private nursing staff, and as Holiday Sister and a Ward Sister until 1903 when she resigned for promotion at Bethnal Green Infirmary. Dodds was awarded the Royal Red Cross - First Class for her work organising the nurse training at the hospital and the nursing care of the wounded soldiers during the First World War. By 1913 Dodds had reformed nursing and nurse training in the infirmary and was reported to run ‘A fine Training School.’ She was President of the County and County Borough Hospital Matrons' Association and Home Office Visitor to Holloway Prison for Women. During the Second World War Dodds lectured on home nursing and first aid for the British Red Cross Society, and was Lady Superintendent of Middlesex / 272 branch of the BRC.
- Bethnal Green Hospital Nurses badge 1930-1948
  Rosalie Dreyer, matron 1934-5, subsequently principal matron London County Council 1935-1948
