= Elizabeth Dodds =

British nurse (1872 – 1944)

Elizabeth Doods RRC
- Born: 1872; Dumfermline, Fife
- Died: 1944 (aged 71–72); Winchmore Hill, Middlesex
- Education: The London Hospital
- Occupation: Nursing Leader

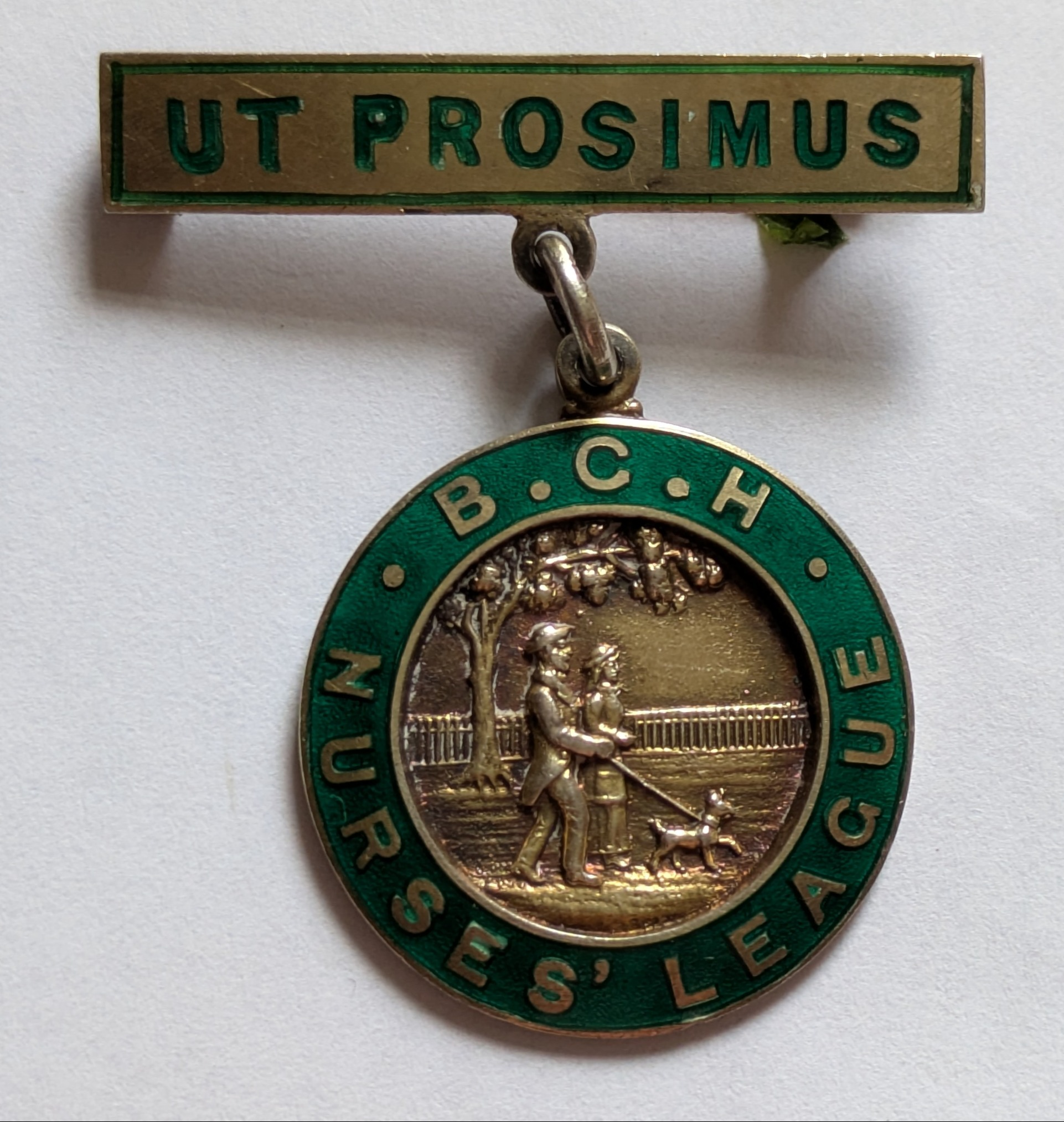
Badge worn by nurses who had trained at Bethnal Green Hospital and were league members

Elizabeth Dodds RRC (31 May 1872 – 25 November 1944) was a nursing leader and matron who ran Bethnal Green military hospital during the First World War. She was an active participant in the professionalisation of nursing.

== Early life ==
Dodds was the fourth child of at least seven born to her father Jackson Dodds, a tax inspector and his wife Maria. Dodds was born in Dumfermline in Fife, Scotland, but by the time she was eight years old the family were living in Hornsey, Middlesex.

== Career ==
Dodds commenced nurse training at Tredegar House in 1897, and transferred to The London Hospital, where she trained under matron Eva Luckes until 1899. After a few months as a private nurse she was appointed as a holiday sister in 1900, and a year later was made a ward sister. In February 1903 she was appointed as Assistant Matron of Bethnal Green Infirmary, and was made matron shortly afterwards. Dodds held this post for over three decades, including during the First World War when the hospital became a military hospital. She implemented many improvements at Bethnal Green and turned it into a 'very fine training school.' Dodds was an early adopter of the concept of a nurses league. Shortly after her appointment as matron of Bethnal Green Hospital, Dodds established the Bethnal Green Nurses League in 1905.

Dodds was an early registrant on the nursing register, committee member of the Poor Law infirmary Matron's Association and the National Council of Nurses for Great Britain. She was President of the County and County Borough Matron's Association for many years, and was also a Home office visitor to Holloway Prison. She held firm views that untrained nurses should not be admitted to the newly created Register of Nurses.

== Retirement ==
Dodds retired in 1934 after 31 years as matron of Bethnal Green Hospital. In 1939 she started to teach home nursing and first aid skills for the British Red Cross Society, and was selected as Lady Superintendent, Middlesex 272, the BRC County branch for Middlesex. When the Second World War started she was put in charge Keble House First Aid Post.

Dodds died in Winchmore Hill, Middlesex on 25 November 1944.
