= Ellen Musson =

British nurse (1867 – 1960)

- Born: 1867; Clitheroe
- Died: 1960 (aged 92–93); Eastbourne
- Occupation: nurse
- Employer: Birmingham General Hospital General Nursing Council
- Organization: Royal College of Nursing
- Known for: Being Chair of the General Nursing Council for England and Wales
- Honours: DBE, RRC

Dame Ellen Musson

Dame Ellen Mary Musson, DBE, RRC (11 August 1867 – 7 November 1960) was Chair of the General Nursing Council for England and Wales. Her nursing career began in 1898. She served prominently at St Bartholomew's Hospital, West Smithfield, London.

== Biography ==
Musson was raised in Clitheroe, Lancashire. Her father, William Edward Musson, was a surgeon, trained at St Thomas' Hospital. She decided, aged 27, to train as a nurse. She started her training on 1 February 1895 at St Bartholomew's, completing in 1898 with that year's highest marks as their gold medallist. She worked as night superintendent and sister before being promoted in 1906 to assistant matron at St Bartholomew's, where she was an active member of the League of St. Bartholomew’s Nurses.

By 1908 Musson was matron at the Swansea General and Eye Hospital, a post she held for three years, where she actively supported the campaign for the eventual Nurses Registration Act 1919. This included co-signing a published letter of support alongside women's campaigners such as Clementina Black, Charlotte Carmichael Stopes and Millicent Fawcett and leading nurses such as Sidney Browne, Annie Warren Gill and Ethel Gordon Fenwick

In December 1908 Musson was appointed matron of Birmingham General Hospital. Musson was the twenty-sixth nurse to be registered with the General Nursing Council in September 1921. Her commitment to furthering the nursing profession included holding the position of Treasurer, International Council of Nurses from 1929 to 1947.

She spent the next two decades working to improve the status of nursing with the College of Nursing and the General Nursing Council.

== Territorial Force Nursing Service ==
Musson joined the Territorial Force Nursing Service (TFNS) when it was established in 1908, and served as principal matron from 1915 to 1918 during the First World War. The TFNS was the nursing wing of the Territorial Army, it consisted of civilian nurses who would provide a reserve of trained nurses for the army, in the event of war. Under the organisation of the TFNS, the country was divided into six regions, and Musson was appointed one of the two matrons for the Birmingham Region. Like other matrons in the TFNS, she encouraged her nurses to join.

== Representation on Committees ==
Musson was a founder member of the Royal College of Nursing, the sixth member on the register, joining in 1916. She served as a Council Member from 1916 to 1939; as Honorary Treasurer from 1939 to 1949; and as Vice-President from 1950 to 1960.

Musson was the first nurse to act as Chair of the General Nursing Council from 1926 to 1943. In 1937 Musson sat on the Inter-Departmental Committee on Nursing Services (Athlone Report), and in 1945 she became president for one year of the National Council of Nurses of Great Britain and Northern Ireland when their work was revived post-war.

== Honours ==
- In 1916 Musson was awarded the Royal Red Cross (RRC)
- In 1928 Musson was appointed a Commander of the Order of the British Empire (CBE)
- In 1932, Musson received an Honorary LL.D from the University of Leeds
- In 1939, Musson was appointed a Dame Commander of the Order of the British Empire (DBE)
- In 1939, Musson was awarded the Florence Nightingale Medal, a medal awarded by the International Red Cross Society biennially in recognition of outstanding service to the nursing profession

== Death ==
Dame Ellen Musson died in Eastbourne, Sussex, on 7 November 1960, aged 93.
