= Dorothy Smith (nurse) =

British nurse and matron (1895–1988)

Dorothy Madge Smith
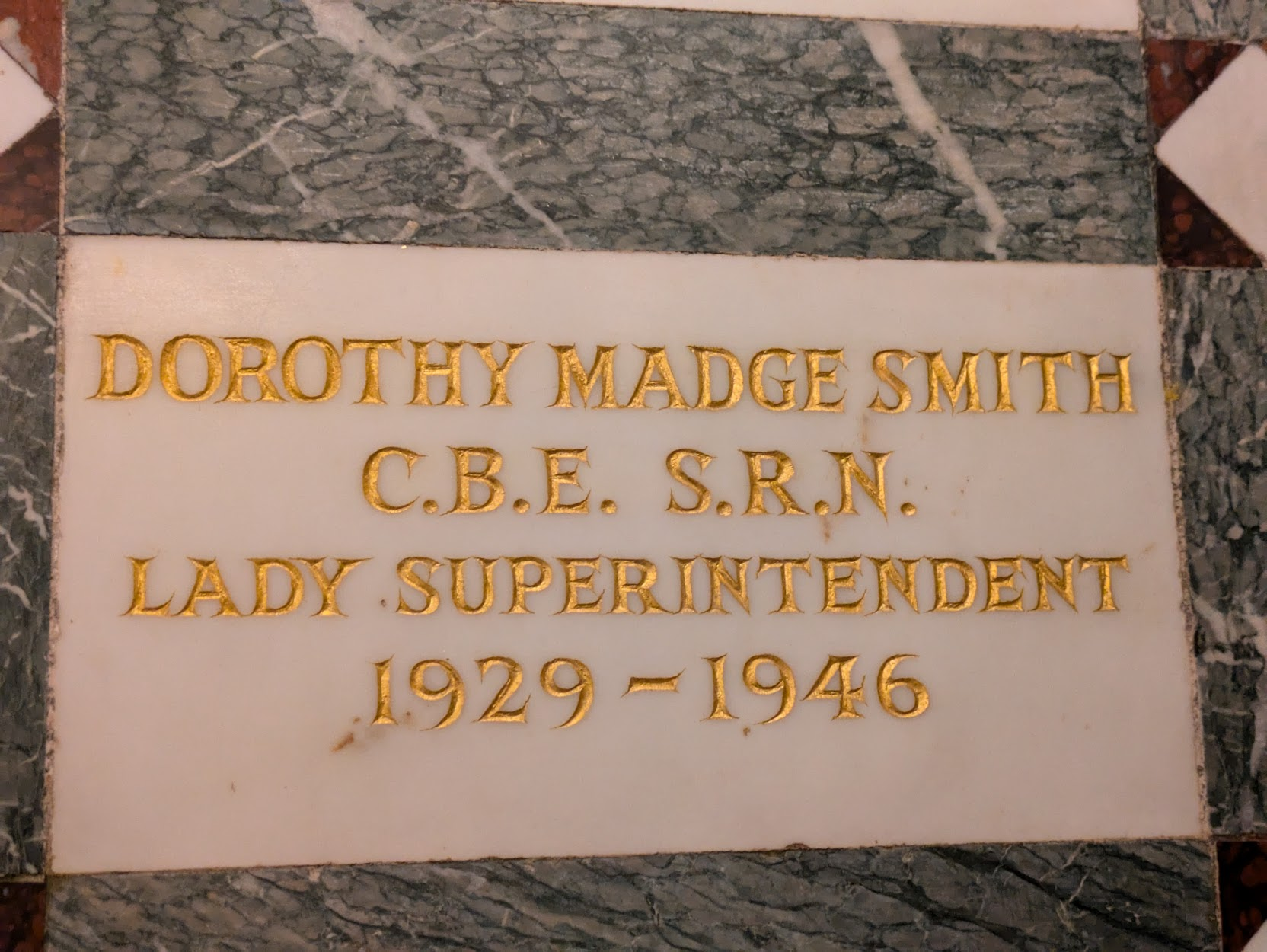
- Memorial stone for Smith
- Born: 14 August 1895
- Died: 5 January 1988 (aged 92)
- Occupation: Nursing leader

Dorothy Madge Smith CBE (14 August 1895 – 5 January 1991) was an influential nursing leader and matron of two large voluntary hospitals in London: firstly the Middlesex Hospital, and secondly Guys hospital. She was Chairman of the General Nursing Council (GNC).

== Early life ==
Smith was the fifth child of ten born into a farming family in Swaffham, Norfolk, England. Her father was one of a long line of farmers. Smith attended Swaffham Grammar School, where she took the School Certificate.

== Early career ==
In 1916 she started her nurse training at Guy's Hospital, London during the First World War. Aged 21 this was the earliest she was able to start training. Smith's leadership skills were soon noticed and she was rapidly promoted. By 1927 she was Assistant Matron at Guy's.

== Matron and leadership roles ==
In 1929 Smith was appointed as Lady Superintendent and Matron at The Middlesex Hospital, in Mortimer Street, London. From the beginning she made reforms including amending the patients breakfast time from 05:00 to 07:00, and increased the nursing sisters off duty. In addition to just one day off per week, she gave the sisters a whole day off per month. She oversaw the opening of a new nurses home in 1931. During the Second World War the Middlesex Hospital, which was in central London, was hit by bombs and Smith remained on duty day and night. She also became a sector matron and was responsible for several extra hospitals, some 50 miles from London.

Smith was also on the nursing advisory boards for the Prison Service and Royal Air Force.

She was Vice Chairman of the General Nursing Council (GNC) from 1939 until 1944. She then became Chair of the GNC from 1944-1955. The GNC was the professional body which regulated mandatory nurse training, examinations and registration. During her 11-year tenure Smith only missed one meeting out of 134. She retired in 1955.

Smith was also President of the Association of Hospital Matrons 1952-1957.

Smith remained as Matron of the Middlesex until 1946 when she was asked to return to Guy's Hospital as Matron, taking over from Emily MacManus. The hospital was badly damaged during the war, but she developed a good working relationship with the Mr W. D. Doherty the medical superintendent and they soon improved the conditions. During her time as matron she oversaw the implementation of study block training, whereby nurses had 1-2 weeks off duty to attend lessons and study in the School of Nursing. She was matron when the National Health Service was established. Smith retired from Guy's in 1953.

== Honours ==
Smith was appointed Officer of the Order of the British Empire (OBE) in the 1943 New Year Honours in recognition of her work as matron of Middlesex Hospital and a member of the Princess Mary's Royal Air Force Nursing Service Advisory Board. She was promoted to Commander of the Order of the British Empire (CBE) in the 1953 Coronation Honours in recognition of her work as chairman of the General Nursing Council for England and Wales, and matron of Guy's Hospital.

== Retirement and death ==
Smith retired in 1953, and enjoyed 35 years of retirement. Her memorial stone is in the Fitzrovia Chapel, formerly the chapel for the Middlesex Hospital.
