= Herringham =

Herringham is a surname. Notable people with the surname include:

- Christiana Herringham (1852–1929), British artist, copyist, and art patron
- Wilmot Herringham (1855–1936), British medical doctor, academic and author
