= Ruth Darbyshire =

British nurse (1878–1946)

Ruth Derbyshire CBE; RRC (First Class)
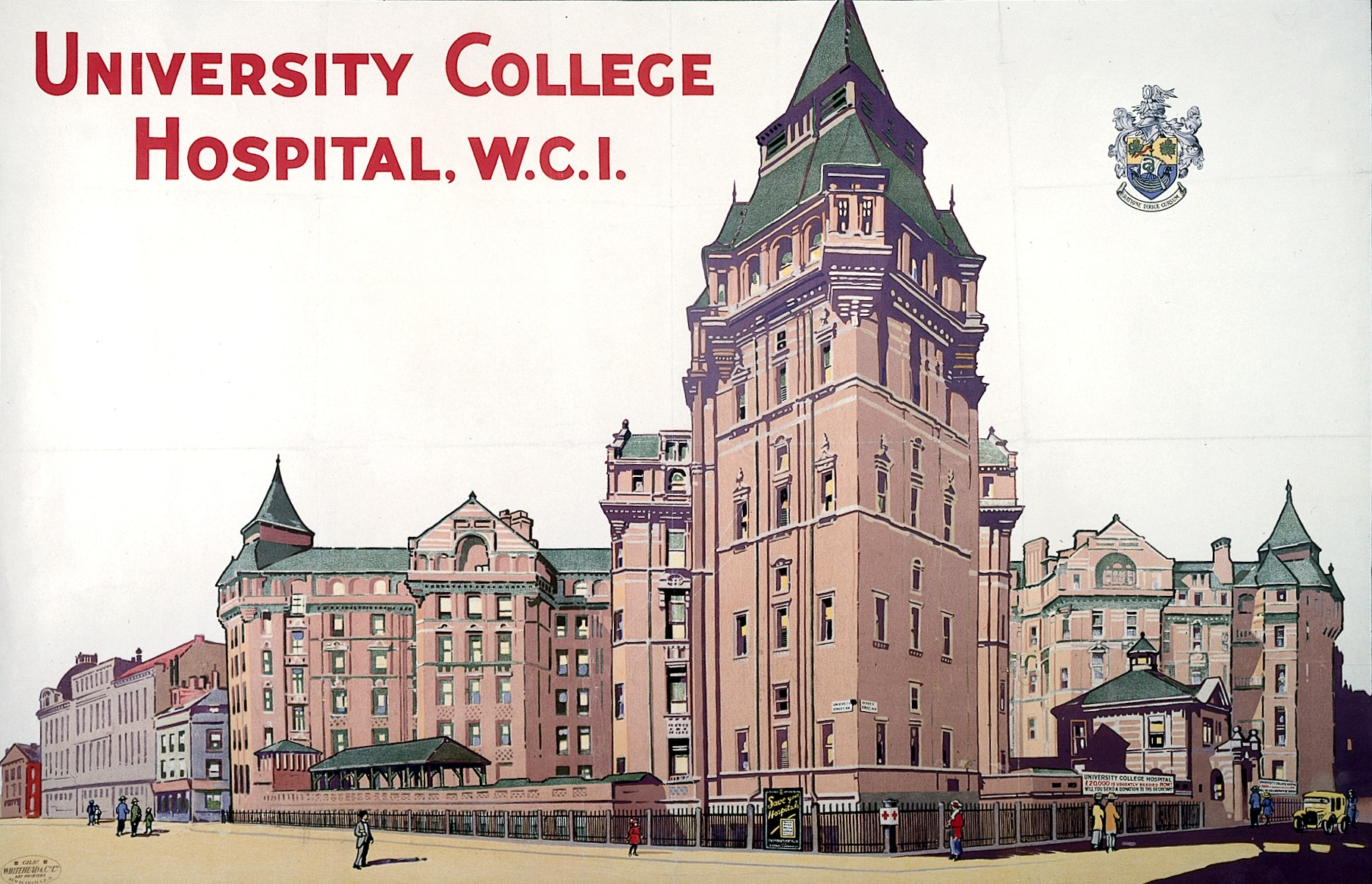
- Born: 12 July 1878; Prestwich, Lancashire, England.
- Died: 7 March 1946 (aged 67)
- Education: St. Thomas' Hospital, London
- Occupation: Nurse
- Years active: 1900- 1943
- Known for: British nurse and leader of the nursing profession. Matron-in-Chief, British Red Cross Society and Order of St John of Jerusalem, 1940–43
- Awards: CBE, RRC, Kaisar-i-Hind Gold Medal

Ruth Eveline Darbyshire CBE RRC SRN (12 July 1878 – 7 March 1946) was a British nurse, and leader of the nursing profession noted for commitment to improving working conditions, education and pensions for nurses.

== Early life ==
Darbyshire was born in Prestwich, Lancashire, England to Helen M. and John F. Darbyshire (a wine and spirit merchant). Darbyshire had at least two siblings, Dorothy and Taylor .

== Early nursing career ==
Darbyshire first trained as a nurse at Wakefield Street Hospital, Adelaide, New South Wales, Australia. She then undertook nurse training at St. Thomas Hospital, London ,1900-1903. She worked as sister in the operating block and isolation block of St. Thomas Hospital before her appointment as Matron at the Royal Infirmary, Derby where she remained until 1913.

== Later nursing career ==
In 1913 Darbyshire was appointed Matron of St Mary's Hospital, Paddington. As matron, Darbyshire along with Dr Sidney Phillips, was appointed in 1916 representative of St, Mary's Hospital on the Consultative Board of the College of Nursing (later to become the Royal College of Nursing). Darbyshire joined the newly formed College of Nursing that year and later described herself as a founding member. Darbyshire was first listed as number 283 on the 1916 College of Nurse's Register of Nurses.

At the outbreak of World War 1 in 1914, she was also appointed Principal Matron of the Second London General Hospital (Territorial Forces) at St. Marks College, Kings Road , Chelsea, South West London. As a Principal Matron, Darbyshire was a member of the Mansion House Committee with a responsibility to mobilize nurses for the Territorial Force Nursing Service across the City and County of London. For her service in war time she was awarded the Royal Red Cross (First Class).

In 1916 Darbyshire resigned her positions in London to take up the post of Chief Lady Superintendent of the Lady Minto's Indian Nursing Association. In this post Darbyshire was responsible for supplying trained nurses and midwives to any part of the Indian Empire. For her work and contribution to nursing in the Indian Empire, she was awarded the Kaisar-i-Hind Gold medal (first class) in 1921 New Years Honours List. She resigned this position in the same year although she remained involved with the Association as secretary of the home branch.

Returning to the United Kingdom, Darbyshire was appointed Matron of University College Hospital, (UCLH) London in 1922. Darbyshire remained in this post for 13 years until her retirement through ill health in 1935. UCLH at the time had close relationships with the American Rockefeller Foundation which funded Darbyshire on a study tour of nursing in the USA. Darbyshire wrote about her observations of American and British nursing.

During the Second World War Darbyshire was Matron-in-Chief of the British Red Cross and Order of St. John of Jerusalem (March 1940 - September 1943).

== Involvement with national nursing organisations ==
Darbyshire held positions on executive committees of many national organisations representing nurses including; the Association of Hospital Matrons, the National Council of Nurses of Great Britain, Darbyshire was also briefly and controversially secretary to the Registrar of the General Nursing Council. She was later an elected member of the General Nursing Council (GNC) 1933–5, and vice chairman 1935–7. Darbyshire served as an elected member of the Council of the Royal College of Nursing (1937–1941).

Darbyshire was a noted speaker on matters concerning the nursing profession, nurse education and was much in demand discussing the proposed change to make state registration for nurses compulsory in the United Kingdom. At the time of her retirement from UCLH, having visited and studied nurse education in many countries, she was described as 'one of the best known nurses in the world'.

In 1930 Darbyshire was appointed to the Lancet Commission on Nursing which was investigating shortages of nurses. The Commission produced 2 interim reports and a final report in 1932. Darbyshire presented evidence from the commission's national survey on nurse education at the International Council of Nursing's 1933 meeting in Brussels.

== Death ==
Darbyshire died on 7 March 1946. Her funeral was held at Golders Green Crematorium and attended by many colleagues from across her career, including the Chairman of the General Nursing Council, Miss DM Smith OBE .

== Honours ==
Royal Red Cross 1916

Kaisar-i-Hind Gold medal (first class) 1921.

Dame Grace of St. John of Jerusalem.

Commander of the British Empire (civil division) 1942.
