= Maude Storey =

British nurse and writer

Maude Storey CBE, FRCN
- Born: 24 March 1930; Wigan, Greater Manchester, England
- Died: 29 March 2003 (aged 73); Reading, Berkshire, England
- Occupation: Nurse
- Known for: President of the Royal College of Nursing

Maude Storey, CBE, FRCN (24 March 1930 – 29 March 2003) was a British nurse, nursing administrator and writer, as well as President of the Royal College of Nursing from 1988 to 1990.

== Career ==
Storey was born at Wigan, where she attended the Wigan and District Mining and Technical College, After training in Manchester, she went to London to qualify as a midwife.

She then returned to Wigan and was named clinical instructor at Wigan Infirmary (1959–68) as well as a member of the Wigan Health Authority. After serving as a regional nursing officer for the Mersey Regional Health Authority, she was appointed registrar of the General Nursing Council of England and Wales (1977–1981); she would be the last such registrar, and the first chief executive of its successor, the Central Council for Nursing, Midwifery and Health Visiting (1981–1987).

== Personal life ==
Never married, Storey was a devout Methodist. She suffered from diabetes although no official cause was given in the news reports of her death, which came five days after her 73rd birthday in Reading, Berkshire in 2003.

== Index of writings by Maude Storey ==
- Operation and education in home health care service: A study on home health care services in a hospital: Wonju Christian Hospital
- Operation and education in home health care service: Operational research on the development of a hospital based home health care program
- Development of a new statutory structure for nursing, midwifery and health visiting in the United Kingdom
- Nurse education conference: meeting society's requirements
- Nurses must take the professional conduct code seriously
- UK Central Council elections: why bother?
- Your profession needs you: determining our destiny
- Keeping an eye on care
