= Alfred Gould (surgeon) =

British medical doctor (1852–1922)

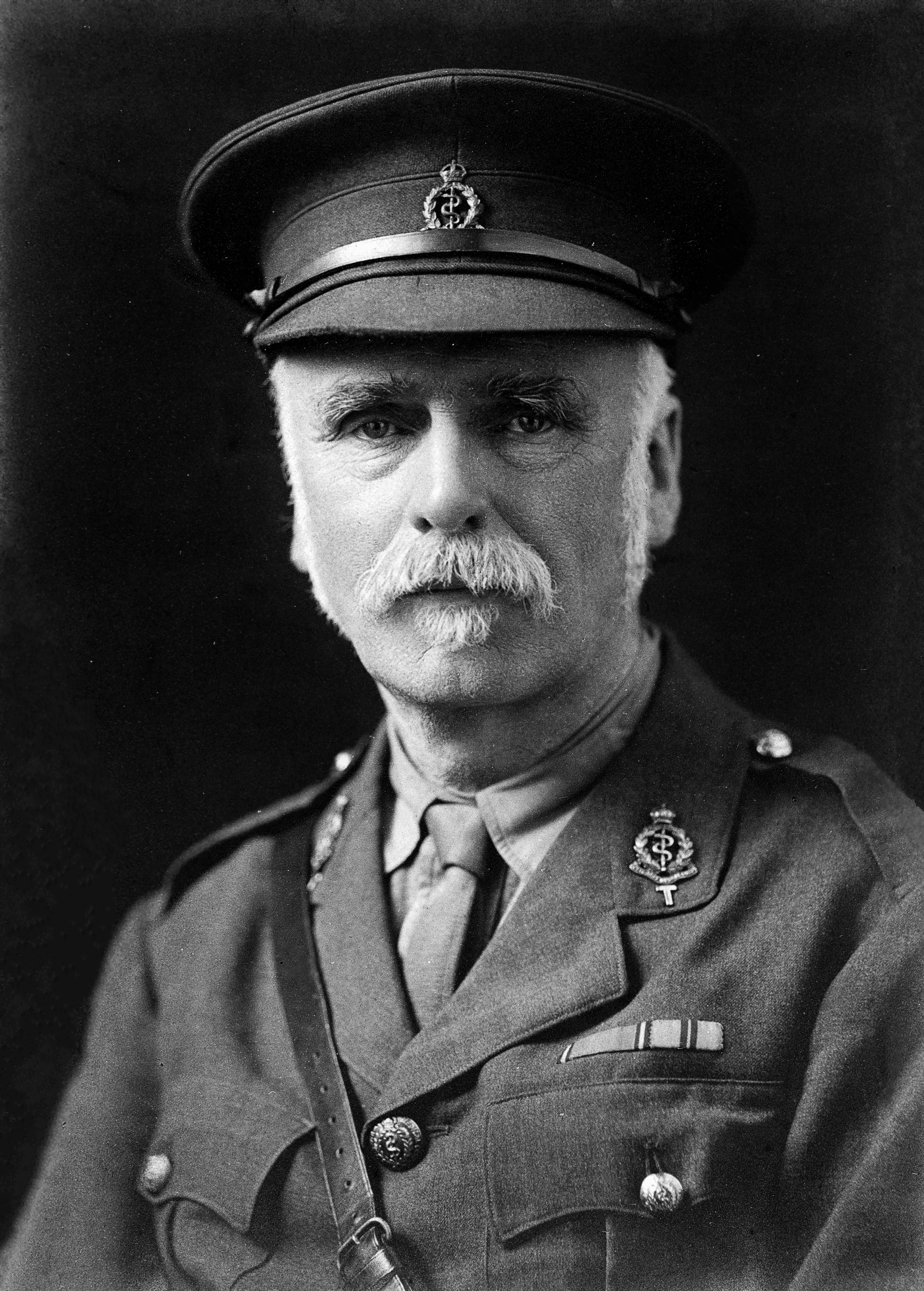
Alfred Pearce Gould

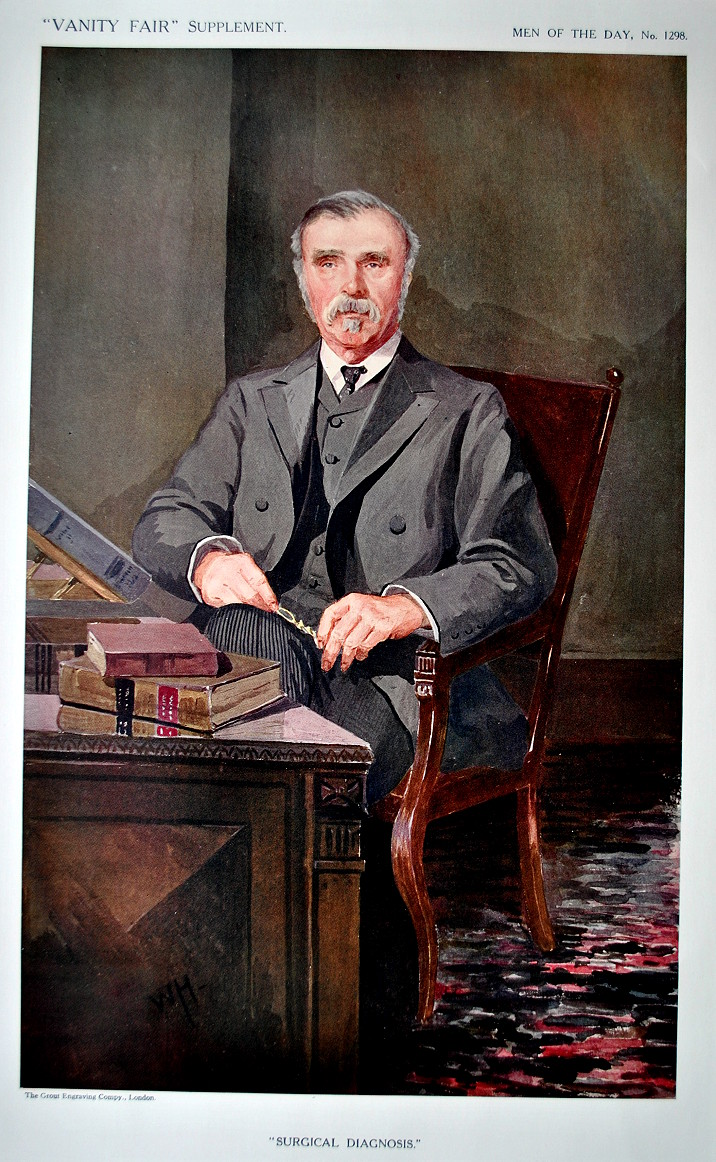
Surgical Diagnosis, Vanity Fair, 1911

Sir Alfred Pearce Gould KCVO CBE FRCS (2 January 1852 in Norwich – 19 April 1922) was Dean of the Faculty of Medicine of the University of London from 1912 to 1916 and was Vice-Chancellor of the university from 1916 to 1917. He was also a Fellow and Member of Council of University College London.

== Education ==
He was educated at Amersham Hall School in Caversham, Oxfordshire, now Berkshire, and then University College, London. He was awarded a gold medal and Scholarship in Medicine, Surgery, and Obstetric Medicine at the MB examination and the gold medal in Forensic Medicine and two years later the gold medal at the MS.

== Career ==
At University College Hospital he was in succession House Physician, House Surgeon, Surgical Registrar, and Demonstrator of Anatomy.

He became Assistant Surgeon at Westminster Hospital and from 1877 to 1887 lectured in the hospitals Medical School. He then became Assistant Surgeon at Middlesex Hospital and Dean of the Medical School during 1886–1892. He was President of the Medical Society of London for a two-year term beginning in 1902. On 7 December 1910 he gave the Bradshaw Lecture to the Royal College of Surgeons of England on cancer.

Pearce's book Elements of Surgical Diagnosis was first published in 1884 and went through ten editions. He was particularly interested in the cause and treatment of cancer.

In World War I he was Major in the Territorial Force in charge of the surgical division of a Territorial General Hospital. He became Lieutenant-Colonel in 1915. He took charge after the 1918 Armistice until the hospital closed in 1920. He was sent to France in 1917 to report on the treatment of wounds.

He was awarded KCVO in 1910 and CBE in 1919 for military service.

== Personal life ==
He was a practising Baptist and total abstainer from alcohol. He married twice and had three sons and five daughters. His second son, Eric Lush Pearce Gould became a surgeon at the Middlesex Hospital. A third son, Alfred Leslie Pearce Gould served in the Royal Navy and was killed in the First World War on 19 May 1918, predeceasing his father, who died in Ashburton, Devon.

== See also ==
- List of honorary medical staff at King Edward VII's Hospital for Officers
- List of Vice-Chancellors of the University of London

Academic offices
Preceded by Sir Wilmot Parker Herringham KCMG CB	Vice-Chancellor of the University of London; 1916–1917	Succeeded by Sir (Edwin) Cooper Perry
