= Elizabeth Elaine Wilkie =

Scottish nurse and health visitor (1915–1998)

Elizabeth Elaine Wilkie OBE FRCN
- Born: 23 August 1915; Edinburgh, Scotland
- Died: 14 December 1998 (aged 83); Edinburgh, Scotland
- Education: King's College Hospital
- Awards: OBE

Elizabeth Elaine Wilkie OBE FRCN (23 August 1915 – 14 December 1998) was a Scottish nurse and the first Director of the Council for the Education and Training of Health Visitors in the UK. Wilkie was instrumental in the development of Health Visitors training in the UK. She received an OBE for her work.

== Early life ==
Wilkie was born on 23 August 1915 in Leith, Edinburgh. She attended George Watson's Ladies College.

== Education and early career ==
Wilkie undertook nursing training at King's College Hospital in London 1939-1939 where she qualified before registering with the General Nursing Council. She also trained as a midwife. She then trained as a health visitor at the Royal Sanitary Institute (later the Royal Society of Medicine), simultaneously working in a first aid post in north London during the Blitz. She qualified in May 1941 and then moved to work as a health visitor in Caterham, Surrey for six years (1941-1947).

In April 1947, Wilkie, formerly Health Visitor and School Nurse at Surrey County Council, was appointed Tutor for the health visitors' course at the Royal College of Nursing.

In 1950, Wilkie completed her Health Visitor Tutor course of the Royal College of Nursing, successfully passing the examinations with distinctions in five subjects.

In 1952, she attended a World Organisation seminar in Geneva.

In 1954, the Royal College of Nursing was invited by the Ministry of Health to nominate a bursar to attend a six week course, arranged by the Centre for Social Workers in Children's Services. Wilkie was awarded the bursary and attended the course in Paris.

While Wilkie was working as a tutor to Health Visitor students at the Royal College of Nursing, she was granted a year's leave of absence from 1956-1957 to complete her study for BA (Hons) Degree in Psychology at Birkbeck College. Wilkie returned to the College in September 1957 after successfully completing her Degree.

During her time as a Health Visitor tutor Wilkie was an examiner for the Royal Sanitary Institute and Royal Society for Public Health examinations for health visitors.

Wilkie left her role as the Organising Tutor to the Public Health Students, Education Department of the Royal College of Nursing in 1960.

== Development of Health Visitor education ==
Wilkie then worked with Fraser Brockington, Professor of Social and Preventive Medicine at the University of Manchester, in developing the first university-based education course for nurses and health visitors. Brockington, with his longstanding interest in the education of health visitors and public health saw in Wilkie an 'able, knowledgeable and stalwart ally'. Wilkie joined Prof Brockington and delivered the course with Nora Marsh, another lecturer. The course started with nine students in 1959. This course developed into the first UK degree in nursing.

In 1962, Wilkie became chief professional adviser to the (new) Council for Training of Health Visitors, becoming its Director in 1971. In 1962, the Health Visiting and Social Work (Training) Act established the Council for the Training of Health Visitors (CTHV) and the Council for Training in Social Work (CTSW) as bodies corporate under a joint chairman appointed by the Privy Council.

The Council of the Royal College of Nursing recognised that a climate for research was not prominent among nurses. Financed by a grant from the Edwina Mountbatten Trust a research appreciation conference took place in March 1965. Wilkie presented her research for discussion at this conference.

Wilkie spend much of her working life influencing the standard and status of health visiting. She was determined that health visitors needed to have a nursing qualification prior to becoming a health visitor.

Wilkie, while chief professional adviser to the Council for the Training of Health Visitors was quoted in The Guardian in 1970 as saying "if health visitors get press at all they get a bad one." The Midwives and Health Visitors Act came out in 1979. Wilkie documented the achievements of the CETHV in 1979.

Wilkie retired in 1975 and then completed her PhD at the University of Edinburgh.

== Personal life ==
When she was 12 her father, a grain broker, died, leaving the family with little money. Her mother was also a nurse. Wilkie suffered with the continual pain of rheumatoid arthritis. She was also a carer for her invalid mother.

Wilkie enjoyed music, which included singing in Church of England choirs when in London and Church of Scotland choirs when in Edinburgh. She was a committed Christian. All her life she retained her Scottish accent and her love for Scotland. When she retired she went back to live in Edinburgh.

== Death ==
Wilkie died in Edinburgh on 14 December 1998, aged 83.

== Honours ==
- Director of the Council for the Education and Training of Health Visitors 1971-1975
- Fellow of the Royal Society of Health in 1963
- World Health Organisation Fellowship in 1964
- Wilkie was appointed Officer of the Order of the British Empire (OBE) in the 1975 New Year Honours.
- In 1976 Wilkie was awarded Fellowship of the Royal College of Nursing (FRCN)

== Bibliography ==
- Wilkie E. 1960. "The Manchester Scheme: The plan of the course", Nursing Times 22 July 1960, pp. 907–908.
- Patricia Hobbs (1973). Aptitude or environment. Foreword by Elaine E. Wilkie and she is mentioned in the acknowledgements
- Grace M. Owen (ed) (1977). Health visiting. Foreword by Elaine E. Wilkie.
- Wilkie E 1979. A history of the Council for the Education and Training of Health Visitors: an account of its establishment and field of activities, 1962-1975
- Wilkie E 1980. The Council for the Education and Training of Health Visitors: a case study of a statutory qualifying association in nursing. Thesis, Dissertation. University of Edinburgh
- Wilkie E 1984. A singular anomaly: a case study of the Council for the Education and Training of Health Visitors, 1962-74 Royal College of Nursing of the United Kingdom, London.
