= Beatrice Brysson Whyte =

British nurse and educator (1921 – 1993)

Beatrice Brysson Whyte (1921 – 27 November 1993) OBE FRCN was a British nurse and educator.

== Biography ==
Brysson Whyte was educated at St Anne’s, Caversham.

Whyte gained experience as a VAD in a Dorking hospital, Surrey which, confirmed her intention to qualify as a nurse. Brysson Whyte trained at the Radcliffe Infirmary, Oxford from 1941 to 1944. She then spent four years in the Queen Alexandra’s Royal Army Nursing Corps (QAIMNS/R) and served in India. After her years in the army she completed her Pt 1 midwifery at the General Lying In Hospital, London and her Pt 2 at Hampstead. She completed her sister tutor’s diploma at the University of London, at King’s College of Household and Social Science.

Whyte started working at Thomas Guy School of Nursing Lambeth in 1951 and continued there until she retired in 1981. She was appointed as a sister tutor in 1951, principal sister tutor in 1962, principal nursing officer (education) in 1971 and director of nurse education from 1975.

In 1959, Whyte received a Red Cross scholarship to travel to North America to study teaching methods.

Whyte became a member of the General Nursing Council in 1965. In this role she was an active member of the education committee. In 1975, she became Chair of the Council’s ad hoc Committee on Examinations and Assessments.

== Personal life and death ==
Brysson Whyte enjoyed classical music and ballet. She was also a proud supporter of Pink Floyd, which included one of her younger relatives, Roger Waters.

Whyte died of cancer on 27 November 1993.

== Honours ==
In 1981, Brysson Whyte was awarded Fellowship of the Royal College of Nursing (FRCN) and was appointed Officer of the Order of the British Empire (OBE).

Barnes Day Hospital was renamed the Brysson Whyte Rehabilitation Unit in 1996 in recognition of her contribution to the science and art of nursing.

== Bibliography ==
- Whyte, Brysson (17 March 1961). "Worm's Eye View". Nursing Times. 57: 332–333.
- Whyte, BB (5 June 1964). "The Human Element". Nursing Times. 60: 720–723. PMID 14154910.
- Whyte, BB (9 April 1965). "Thoughts on Nursing". Nursing Times. 61: 499–500. PMID 14288652.
- Whyte, BB (26 November 1970). "Practical examinations in the ward". Nursing Times. 66 (48): 179–180. PMID 5477448.
- Whyte, B (21 May 1981). "Thinking about tomorrow's patient. Interview by Alison Dunn". Nursing Times. 77 (21): 892–893. PMID 6909804.
- Whyte, Brysson (18 January 1969). "Personal View". British Medical Journal. 1 (5637): 179. doi:10.1136/bmj.1.5637.179. PMC 1982277.
- Darwin, Joan; Markham, Joan; Whyte, Brysson (1972). Bedside Nursing: An Introduction. Heinemann Medical. ISBN 978-0-433-07133-4. OCLC 599137604.
- Morgan, Wendy; Whyte, Brysson (1975). Pupil Nurse's Workbook. McGraw-Hill. ISBN 978-0-07-084209-0. OCLC 16376341.
