= Celeste Bowe =

Irish nun and nurse

Personal life
- Born: 23 February 1931 Newberry, Mallow, County Cork
- Died: 9 August 1976 (aged 45) Chalmers Hospital, Edinburgh

Religious life
- Religion: Roman Catholic
- Order: Daughters of Charity of Saint Vincent de Paul

Sister Celeste Bowe MBE (23 February 1931 – 9 August 1976) was an Irish Daughters of Charity of Saint Vincent de Paul nun and nurse.

== Life ==
Sister Celeste Bowe was born Catherine Mary Bowe also known as Ina in Newberry, Mallow, County Cork on 23 February 1931. Her parents were James and Julia Bowe (née Ducey). Her father was a labourer. She attended the local national and secondary schools. She went to St Vincent's Hospital, Pinner, Middlesex in 1949 to train as a nurse, taking first place in the final examinations in Great Britain in 1951. She qualified in 1953 as a state registered nurse at St John's and St Elizabeth's Hospital, London. She returned as a staff nurse to St Vincent's Hospital, Dublin.

On 20 February 1956, Bowe entered the Congregation of the Daughters of Charity of Saint Vincent de Paul in Dublin. She received her habit in Paris on 9 September 1957 under the name Sister Celeste. She was a novice from 1957 to 1961 in Cork, professing on 15 March 1961. She was a nurse in the North Infirmary, Cork, Our Lady's Hospital for Sick Children, Crumlin, Dublin, and St Vincent's, Pinner. In 1965 she was awarded the London University diploma in nursing and in 1967 she received her nurse tutor diploma at University College Dublin. She then qualified as a registered nurse for those with mental disabilities. She was appointed principal tutor at St Joseph's Hospital for the mentally handicapped at Rosewell, near Edinburgh, Scotland in 1967. During this period in the 1960s and early 1970s, these institutions were custodial.

Bowe studied the advances in mental handicap nursing from Kansas, United States, receiving a Churchill scholarship to study the normalisation of children with learning disabilities in Scandinavia. There she was introduced to the concepts of community and individualised care for those with learning disabilities. She applied the reward system from the Kansas model as well as developing the person-centred training system which focused on maximising the children in their care. She also introduced music for therapy and recreation. St Joseph's established a registered course in nursing for those with learning disabilities, with student nurses from Scottish general hospitals attending St Joseph's for three months of nurse training. Bowe was part of the foundation of a special boarding school for children aged 4 to 18 years in 1969. Alongside the principal tutor at Lennox Castle Hospital, Glasgow, Daniel Williamson, Bowe developed a course for nurses designed specifically for children with mental disabilities.

Bowe developed a reputation as the national authority for the nursing and care of those with learning disabilities, serving on relevant committees under the Nursing Council for Scotland and the Royal College of Nursing on the Scottish Board. She was the chair of the Lothian Region Nursing and Midwifery Consultative Committee and lectured at the Royal College of Nursing on the postgraduate management courses. In 1973 she was a member and chair of the Lothian health council, advocating for those with learning disabilities. She also created a professional study group at the University of Edinburgh on the subject. She was the first nun or Catholic to be appointed to the General Nursing Council of Scotland. She was awarded the MBE in 1975 for services to nursing. Bowe died in Chalmers Hospital, Edinburgh on 9 August 1975, and is buried in St Matthew's cemetery, Rosewell.
