= Gwendoline Kirby =

British nurse

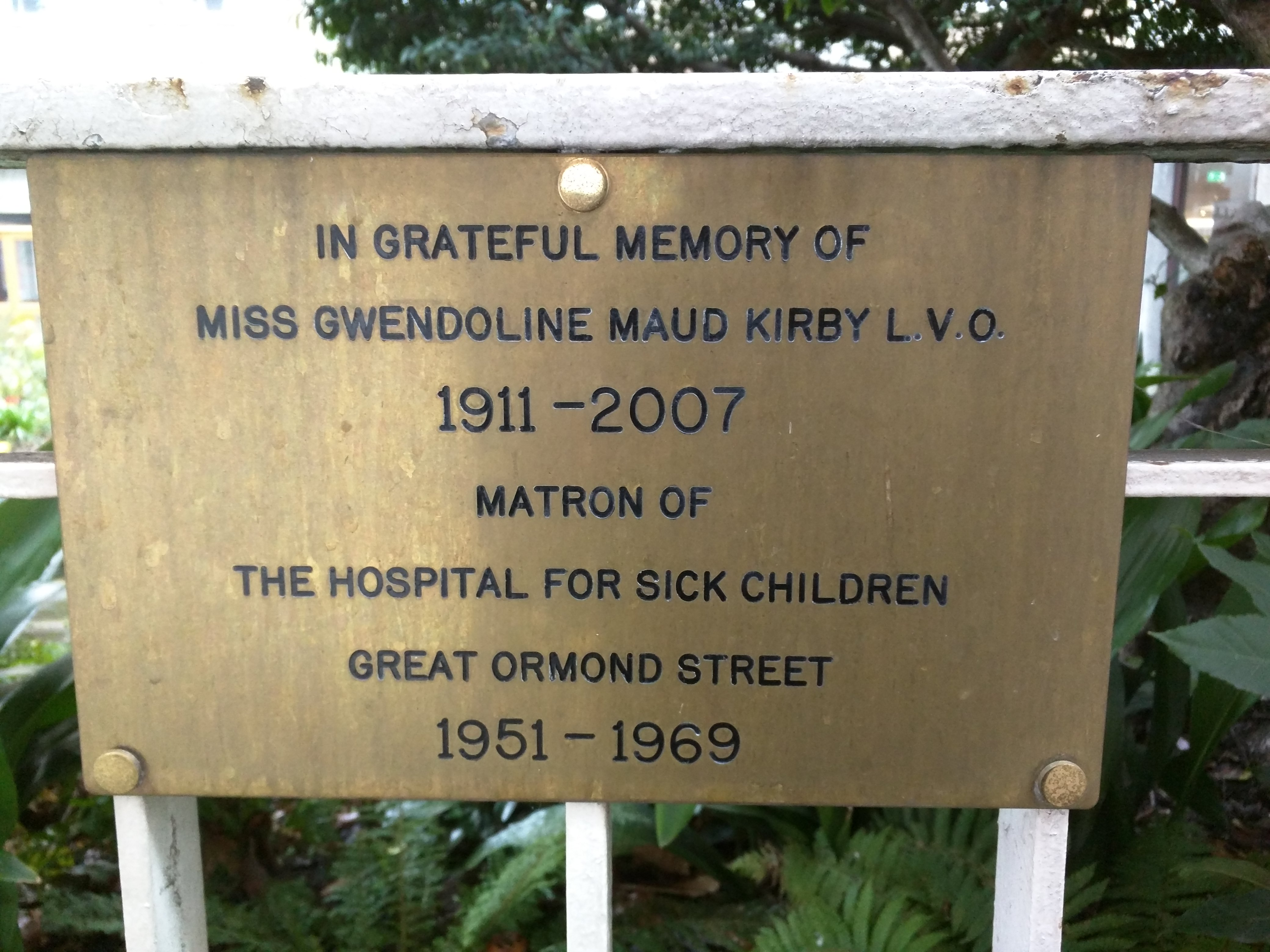
Plaque commemorating Gwendoline Kirby at Great Ormond Street Hospital

Gwendoline Maud Kirby LVO (1911–2007) was a British nurse, and matron of Great Ormond Street Hospital from 1951 to 1969.

== Early nursing career ==
Miss G M Kirkby trained to be: a general nurse at the Nightingale School of Nursing, St.Thomas' Hospital, London, a midwife at the General Lying-in Hospital and a Registered Sick Children's Nurse at Great Ormond Street Hospital. She was sister for paediatric medical and surgical wards at St. Thomas' Hospital held ward sister posts. Awarded a travel scholarship from the Florence Nightingale Fund, St. Thomas Hospital in 1948 she undertook a study tour of nursing practice in children's hospitals in America and undertook a clinical supervision course at the University of Toronto School of Nursing.

== Later nursing career ==
Miss Kirkby was appointed matron at Great Ormond Street Hospital in 1950 on the retirement of Miss Dorothy A Lane, previously matron for fifteen years. As matron she was responsible for the nursing staff and nurse training. Guest speaker at the School of Nursing's 1956 prizegiving was the Princess Royal, who had been a nurse probationer at the hospital in World War One. Matron Kirkby led a number of innovations in the training of paediatric nurses including establishing a school for enrolled nurses within the hospital. She was a member of the Royal College of Nursing's Committee on Nurse Education (Chair Sir Harry Platt)

Matron Kirkby met Queen Elizabeth II when she made an official visit to the hospital in 1952, its centenary, formally greeted her on behalf of the hospital when she visited Princess Anne after the latter's 1958 tonsillectomy, and met her again at the hospital's 150th anniversary celebration, when the queen recognised her.

Miss Kirby was an elected Registered Sick Children's Nurse member of the General Nursing Council of England and Wales (1955–1965). In 1964 she was appointed President of the National Association of Nursery Matrons.

She appeared as a castaway on the BBC Radio programme Desert Island Discs on 24 December 1966. She died in 2007.

== Affiliations ==
Royal College of Nursing

== Awards ==
LVO Member of the Fourth Class of the Royal Victorian Order, awarded 14 June 1969
