= Nora Milnes =

British social worker, educator and author

Nora Milnes (23 October 1882 – 13 November 1972) was a British economist, social worker, educator and author. Born in London, she spent her working life in London and Edinburgh, where she played a prominent role in the development of social work as a professional activity worthy of a place in higher education.

== Career ==
After working in London as a caseworker for the Charity Organization Society, and then as a lecturer at the London School of Economics (LSE), Nora Milnes went on to become one of the founding mothers of social work education in the UK. She became first Director of the Edinburgh School of Social Study and Training in 1918, and spearheaded the school's admittance into the University of Edinburgh proper in 1928. She remained as Head of the School of Social Studies until her retirement in 1951, publishing three academic books, a number of journal articles and many newspaper articles.

== Legacy ==
Nora Milnes' legacy is demonstrated in both her writing and research and her profession-building activities at organisational level. Her research on poverty confirmed her belief that ill-health was a social issue, not a personal failing. This led her to write in her 1920 book on child welfare:

- '[...] a wise understanding of social influence is necessary for the solving of the child health problems. The person with an exclusively medical training can no more expect to tackle a social question unaided than a person with an exclusively social training can be expected to recognise and tackle the symptoms of disease. Both are essential if the linked thread of cumulative social evil is to be severed; as essential as the two blades to the shears that sever a material thread' (p20).

She played a key role in the development of both social work and nursing professional accreditation in Scotland and in the UK more broadly. She was elected to the position of Secretary of the Provisional Committee of the British Federation of Social Workers at its formation in 1917; the federation went on to become the British Association of Social Workers, commonly known as BASW. She was also appointed to the first ever General Nursing Council for Scotland by the Scottish Education Department (SED) in 1922, demonstrating the close relationship at that time between social work and health visiting/nursing education.

The University of Edinburgh recognised Nora Milnes' contribution to social services and higher education by awarding her an Honorary LLD (Doctor of Laws) in 1958

== Publication history ==
=== Journal articles ===
- Milnes, Nora (1917) 'Mint Records in the Reign of Henry VIII.' The English Historical Review, 1917-04-01, Vol.32 (126), p. 270-273. Longmans, Green and Co.
- Milnes, Nora (1917) 'Some aspects of the infant welfare question.' The Sociological Review (Keele), 1917–10, Vol.19 (3), p. 121-128. Oxford, UK: Blackwell Publishing Ltd.
- Milnes, Nora (1929) 'The difficulties encountered in recruiting and training voluntary and professional workers in a social case agency.' Charity Organisation Quarterly, 1929-01-01, Vol.3 (1), p. 21-31.
- Milnes, Nora (1931) 'Public health and the family.' Charity Organisation Quarterly, 1931-10-01, Vol.5 (4), p. 148-157.
- Milnes, Nora (1932) 'Social Aspects of British Health Insurance.' The Social Service Review (Chicago), 1932-12-01, Vol.6 (4), p. 581-591. Published by: The University of Chicago Press.

=== Books ===
- Milnes, Nora (1920) Child Welfare from the Social Point of View, London: J.M. Dent & Sons.
- Milnes, Nora (1926) The Economics of Wages and Labour. London: P.S. King & Son.
- Milnes, Nora (1936) A Study of Industrial Edinburgh and the Surrounding Area, 1923-1934. London: P.S. King & Son.

=== Book reviews ===
- Book review (1921): Child Welfare by Nora Mines. The Elementary School Journal Vol. 22, No. 1 (Sep., 1921), pp. 71–72 (2 pages). Published by: The University of Chicago Press.
- Book review (1927): Milnes, Nora. The Economics of Wages and Labour by Douglas, Paul H., Boston, Mass., etc.: Academy of Political Science. Political Science Quarterly, 1927-01-01, Vol. 42, p. 477.
- Book review (1937): Edinburgh—An Industrial Study, by Nora Milnes. Charity Organisation Quarterly, 1937-07-01, Vol.11 (3), p. 207-210.
- Book review (1937): A Study of Industrial Edinburgh, 1923–1934. Jones, D. Caradog; Milnes, Nora. The Economic Journal, 1937-06-01, Vol.47 (186), p. 354-355. MacMillan and Co. Limited.

=== Newspaper articles ===
- Nora Milnes (1921) 'Social Study and Training.' The Scotsman (1921-1950), 1921-08-02, p. 6. Edinburgh, Scotland; Scotsman Publications.
- Nora Milnes (1923) 'Cobden's Fiscal Views.' The Scotsman (1921-1950), 1923-12-05, p. 6. Edinburgh, Scotland; Scotsman Publications.
- Nora Mines (1924) 'Social Study.' The Scotsman (1921-1950), 1924-10-20, p. 13. Edinburgh, Scotland; Scotsman Publications.
- Nora Milnes (1925) 'Training of Health Visitors.' The Scotsman (1921-1950), 1925-07-09, p. 5.Edinburgh, Scotland; Scotsman Publications.
- Nora Milnes (1930) 'Edinburgh Royal Infirmary Waiting List.' The Scotsman (1921-1950), 1930-03-13, p. 7. Edinburgh, Scotland; Scotsman Publications.
- Nora Milnes (1932) 'Hospital Almoners.' The Scotsman (1921-1950), 1932-05-10, p. 7. Edinburgh, Scotland; Scotsman Publications.
- Nora Milnes (1936) 'Child Guidance.' The Scotsman (1921-1950), 1936-03-02, p. 11. Edinburgh, Scotland; Scotsman Publications.
- Nora Milnes (1962) 'Brushed Aside.' The Times (London, England) Issue: 55391, 15 May 1962, p. 11.
