= Marjorie Gardener =

British nurse educator and administrator

Marjorie Gardener OBE FRCN
- Born: 1918
- Died: 1999 (aged 80–81)
- Known for: nurse, educationalist and administrator

Marjorie Grace Gardener OBE, FRCN (1918 - 1999), was an English nurse, educationalist and administrator.

== Early life ==
Gardener was born in London on 22 February 1918.

== Education and early career ==
Gardener was a talented amateur musician who did not set out to be a nurse. Her plan was to study medicine, but following the death of her father there was no money to pay for medical school. She trained as a teacher at London University and became a licentiate of the Royal Academy of Music (LRAM). Gardener undertook her general nurse training at the Middlesex Hospital. She did her midwifery at St Luke’s Hospital, Guildford and at the Sussex Maternity Hospital, Brighton. She worked at the Church of Scotland Mission Hospital, Tiberias, Israel and at King George V Hospital, Malta. When she returned to the UK she worked as a ward sister and undertook a course in nursing administration. She then became an assistant matron at the Middlesex Hospital Gardener commenced her role as an inspector of nurse training schools of the General Nursing Council for England and Wales in 1964. From 1 July 1970 Gardener was appointed as the Principal Officer for the Joint Board of Clinical Studies. She retired after 8 years working in this role. In that time the Board produced 66 outline curricula for long courses and 16 for short courses. In 1977 Gardener was a member of one of three Briggs Working groups. This group focused on preparation for legislation, funding for the new statutory bodies and arrangement for a handover.

== Personal life ==
Gardener was a committed Christian. She was first a Baptist and later became a Methodist. On retirement Gardener shared a home with her long-standing friend Joy Bellimore, also a senior nurse administrator.

== Death ==
Gardener died in Sevenoaks, Kent on 21 November 1999.

== Honours ==
- Gardener received a Fellowship from the World Health Organisation in 1972. She travelled extensively in the USA studying the national needs and trends in post-basic education and organisation of courses at national, state and local level.
- Gardener was appointed an Officer of the Order of the British Empire (OBE) in the 1977 Queen's Silver Jubilee honours list for her services to the development of clinical nursing practice and the promotion of high standards of nursing care
- In 1977 Gardener was awarded Fellowship of the Royal College of Nursing (FRCN).
- Gardener undertook a short term consultancy for WHO in Geneva in 1977. This involved looking at the development of guidelines for nurse education programmes and assisting in the design of field testing the guidelines.

== Bibliography ==
Gardener MG. Teach-in. Joint Board of Clinical Nursing Studies. 1. The philosophy. Nurs Times. 1973 Apr 19;69(15):Suppl:61-3. PMID 4699069.

Gardener MG. The history, philosophy and evaluation of the work of the Joint Board of Clinical Nursing Studies. J Adv Nurs. 1977 Nov;2(6):621-32.

Gardener MG. Letter: The nurse in group practice. Br Med J 1974;2:330 (Published 11 May 1974)
