= Thomas Ferguson (medical doctor) =

Thomas Ferguson FRSE CBE (23 May 1900 – 1 May 1977) was a Scottish surgeon and Professor of Public Health from 1944 to 1964 at the University of Glasgow. Much of his early writing and philosophy paved the way for the National Health Service in Britain after the Second World War.

== Life ==
He was born on 23 May 1900 the son of Alexander Gray Ferguson.

He attended the University of Edinburgh graduating with an MB ChB in 1922. During his studies he received Wellcome Medals for essays on the heart (1921) and on Joseph Black (1922). He received a Diploma in Public Health in 1923 and his doctorate (MD) in 1924 aged 24. He worked as Assistant Medical Officer of Health in Stirling then briefly moved to England for a similar role in Darlington. He served as part as HM Medical Inspector of Factories for the Home Office 1929-1930, during the rise of Health and Safety concerns in the workplace. He was also Chairman of the Committee on Carcinogenic Action of Mineral Oils and Chairman of the General Nursing Council Scotland. He was an honorary Consultant Physician at the Glasgow Western Infirmary and Falkirk Royal Infirmary.

In 1932 the University of Edinburgh awarded him an honorary doctorate (DSc). In 1933 he was elected a Fellow of the Royal Society of Edinburgh. His proposers were Alexander Gray McKendrick, William Frederick Harvey, William Ogilvy Kermack, and William Glen Liston.

From 1933 to 1944 he worked for the Scottish Department of Health, mainly on policy issues, before being offered Professor of Public Health by the University of Glasgow in 1944, where he stayed until he retired.

During the Second World War he was Medical Superintendent in charge of Gleneagles Hospital, the famous hotel being converted to hospital use during the war.

He was created a Commander of the Order of the British Empire in 1954 for his work on public health.

In 1973 his wife, Ann Elizabeth Webster died. They had no children. He died on 1 May 1977 in Ramsey, Isle of Man. He left his entire estate to the University of Glasgow with a caveat that the funds be used to improve social activities.

== Publications ==
- The Dawn of Scottish Social Welfare (1948)
- Scottish Social Welfare 1864-1914 (1958)
