= Wilmot Herringham =

British medical doctor, academic and author

Major-General Sir Wilmot Herringham KCMG CB FRCP
- Born: Wilmot Parker Herringham; 17 April 1855; Guildford
- Died: 23 April 1936 (aged 81); Lymington
- Military career
- Allegiance: United Kingdom
- Branch: British Army
- Rank: Major-General
- Unit: Royal Army Medical Corps
- Conflicts: World War I

Sir Wilmot Parker Herringham KCMG CB FRCP (17 April 1855 – 23 April 1936) was a British medical doctor, academic and author. He was one of the first doctors to investigate the effect and treatment of poison gas in World War I.

== Life ==
Wilmot Parker Herringham was born at Guildford on 17 April 1855, the son of William Walton Herringham and Matilda Anne Parker. His father was a Prebendary of Wells Cathedral. He was educated at Winchester College. He then matriculated at the University of Oxford in 1873 as a member of Keble College, studying classics. Whilst at Keble, he rowed for the college 1st VIII, played football for the 1st XI and captained the cricket team. He obtained a second-class degree in classics in 1877, and then studied medicine, obtaining his medical degrees in 1882.

He started his medical career at St Bartholomew's Hospital, London, and was appointed consultant physician in 1904; he held this post until 1919. He was knighted in 1914, and advanced to Knight Commander of the Order of St Michael and St George (KCMG) in 1919; he was also made a Companion of the Order of the Bath (CB) in 1915.

== First World War service ==
At the outbreak of the First World War, Herringham was a lieutenant-colonel in command of the medical unit of the London University OTC. Between 1914 and 1919, he was consultant physician to the British Forces in France in the Royal Army Medical Corps, initially as a Colonel and rising to the rank of Major-General in 1918. Herringham was already sufficiently well known that his army appointment was reported in the New York Times under the headline "Famous Doctors to Front". He was mentioned in dispatches. Sir Douglas Haig records in his diary a visit to a casualty clearing station where "I saw Sir Wilmot Herringham with his coat off, setting a fine example, by washing and attending to the slightly wounded cases". Herringham was among the first doctors to examine the victims of the use of poison gas at the second Battle of Ypres. He was one of the contributors to a report to Lord Kitchener, the British Secretary of State for War five days after the initial attack. He continued to take an interest in the treatment of poison gas victims for the rest of the war. In his war memoirs, Herringham admitted that he learned more medicine during his time in France than in any other five-year period.

== Post-war career ==
Herringham stood as a candidate for parliament in 1918 for the London University seat. He was offered the position of Regius Professor of Medicine at Oxford in 1920, but refused, considering himself to be unsuitable to the post. He was vice-chancellor of the University of London between 1912 and 1915. He served as chairman of the General Nursing Council for England and Wales between 1922 and 1926, and was a member of the council of Bedford College, University of London, at the time a college for women. Between 1921 and 1929 he was chairman of the governors of the Old Vic and wrote for theatre's magazine. In 1929 he delivered the annual Harveian Oration to the Royal College of Physicians. He was appointed an Honorary Fellow of Keble in 1931. He died on 23 April 1936 at his sister's home in Lymington.

== Family ==
In 1880 he married Christiana Powell at Guildford. They had two sons, one of whom died from acute arthritis as a child whilst the other died in the First World War. His wife became a celebrated Edwardian artist and patron of the arts. In 1906, Herringham accompanied her to India where on this and another visit, she made copies of the Buddhist cave paintings at Ajanta near Hyderabad, which were deteriorating badly. Herringham contributed a brief description of their expedition to the published edition of the paintings. By 1911, Herringham's wife suffered from delusions of pursuit and persecution and was admitted to an asylum, spending the rest of her life in mental institutions. In 1916, Herringham was cited as a co-respondent in a divorce case brought by William Rothenstein.

== Publications ==
In addition to numerous contributions to scholarly journals and medical textbooks, his publications include:

- A Physician in France
- History of the Great War, based on official documents: Medical Services
- The life and times of Dr. William Harvey

== See also ==
- List of Vice-Chancellors of the University of London
- Portrait by Sir James Gunn on "Your Paintings"

Academic offices
Preceded by Sir William Job Collins	Vice-Chancellor of the University of London; 1912-1915	Succeeded by Sir Alfred Pearce Gould KCVO CBE
