= Annie Warren Gill =

British nurse and president of the College of Nursing in 1927 (1862–1930)

- Born: 1862; Castletown, Isle of Man
- Died: 2 March 1930 (aged 67–68); Hove, England
- Resting place: Malew Churchyard, Isle of Man
- Occupation: Nurse
- Known for: President of the College of Nursing
- Medical career
- Institutions: Royal Infirmary of Edinburgh; Royal Berkshire Hospital

Annie Warren Gill CBE, RRC & Bar (1862 – 2 March 1930) was a Manx nurse who served as president of the College of Nursing in 1927.

== Life ==
Gill was born in Castletown, Isle of Man, the daughter of Reverend Thomas Howard Gill, Vicar of Malew. She had a sister Ella and spent time in Rome and Paris growing up. Gill trained as a nurse at the Royal Infirmary of Edinburgh eventually being appointed as a head nurse (later retitled sister). She left the Infirmary in 1900 during the Second Boer War to serve as matron of the Edinburgh South-East of Scotland Hospital that had been relocated to South Africa. On completion of her assignment in South Africa she resumed her role at the Royal Infirmary for a time before being asked to return to the country as matron of a concentration camp in the Orange River Colony, for which she received the Royal Red Cross in October 1901. Gill was a Principal Matron in the Territorial Army Nursing Service (2nd Scottish). In June 1903 Gill was appointed to the position of matron of the Royal Berkshire Hospital before being elected in 1907 by the board of the Royal Infirmary of Edinburgh as matron, a position she held until 1925. She was the first trainee of the RIE - known as a ‘pelican’ – to hold the position of Lady Superintendent.

During the debate that led to the introduction of mandatory registration for nurses in the United Kingdom, Gill, as a member of the General Nursing Council for Scotland, campaigned for separate registration in Scotland.

Gill was involved in the founding of the College of Nursing in 1916. She was instrumental in establishing the Scottish board of the College of Nursing, which held its first meeting on 1 November 1916 at 122 George Street, Edinburgh. She also saw the necessity of setting up local branches to build up membership. In the 1919 New Year Honours, Gill was awarded a bar to the Royal Red Cross in recognition of her service during World War I. After consultation with Bedford Fenwick she founded the Scottish Matrons' Association, similar to the Matron's Council of Great Britain and Ireland. She was president of the Scottish Matrons Association from 1910 to 1925 and president of the College of Nursing in 1927. She was a member of the National Council of Women and an assistant editor of the British Journal of Nursing.

Gill took a considerable interest in nursing organisations and attended the Interim Conferences of the International Council of Nurses in Paris (1907) and Geneva (1927). Bergljot Larsson spent time at the Royal Infirmary of Edinburgh with Gill from 1908 to 1911. When she returned to Norway she founded and led the Norwegian Nursing Association.

In June 1929 she was appointed Commander in the Civil Division of the Order of the British Empire.

Gill died in Hove on 2 March 1930. She is buried in Malew Churchyard.

== Legacy ==
The Annie Warren Gill prize for Dietetics was created in her memory. In 2013 the Isle of Man College of Further & Higher Education named a building in her honour.
