= Alice Reeves =

Irish nurse

- Born: December 1874
- Died: 21 October 1955 (aged 80); Dublin, Ireland

Alice Reeves RRC (December 1874 – 21 October 1955) was an Irish nurse and matron of Dr Steevens’ Hospital, Dublin. Described by surgeon, T. G. Wilson, as "undoubtedly one of the greatest nurses Ireland has ever produced." Reeves helped create the first rules of the general nursing council in the 1920s and she received the honour of a Florence Nightingale Medal.

== Biography ==
Alice Reeves was born in December 1874. She was the daughter of the Rev. Charles Robert Reeves, clergyman, and Charlotte Reeves (née Haire). At age five or six, Reeves was orphaned, and was raised by her aunt. At 19 she went to Adelaide Hospital, Dublin to train as a nurse, staying there as a ward sister after her training. She was appointed matron of the Royal Victoria Eye and Ear Hospital in 1908, and remained there until 22 October 1918, when she was appointed lady superintendent and matron of Dr Steevens’ Hospital. She would go on to hold this position for 30 years.

At the time of her appointment to Dr Steevens', the economy was suffering in the aftermath of World War I, leading to a need to change the training requirements for nurses to attract suitable candidates. Among the initial suggestions Reeves made to the hospital's board of governors was to abolish the entrance fee for probationer nurses. Instead, the probationer nurses would receive their certificate of qualification only after completing three years’ training, proving their nursing ability. The establishment of this practice helped in the professionalisation and standardisation of nursing, mirroring similar work by Margaret Huxley at Sir Patrick Dun's Hospital, Dublin.

Reeves was the first president of the Adelaide Hospital League of Nurses and a founding member of the Florence Nightingale committee. When the National Council of Nurses was established under the Nurses Registration (Ireland) Act of 1919, she was one of the first appointees. When the Irish Free State was established in 1922, she formally applied for the council's affiliation to the International Council of Nurses in Helsinki, Finland. With Huxley, Reeves was instrumental in the formulation of the first rules of the general nursing council, a council that was founded after the nurses’ registration act was passed in 1925. She was a founding member of the Irish Matrons’ Association, helping to draft its constitution. She was also a founder of the Nation's Tribute to Nurses Fund, a fund that supported old or otherwise distressed nurses financially.

For her work in the standardisation and professionalisation of nursing, Reeves received a number of honours. She received a Royal Red Cross for her work during WWI. Dublin University awarded her an honorary MA degree in 1947, and in 1949 she was the first Irishwoman to receive the Florence Nightingale Medal. When she retired from Dr Steevens', she was presented with a portrait of herself. Reeves died in the Merrion Nursing Home on 21 October 1955, and is buried at Mount Jerome Cemetery.
