= Health visitor =

Healthcare professionals

Health visitors are professional individuals engaged in public health work within the domestic setting, predominantly found in countries with state-funded health systems. They are distinct from district nurses, who provide clinical healthcare, domestically.

== Responsibilities ==
Health visitors are mainly concerned with helping to ensure that people's domestic behaviour is sanitary, hygienic, and beneficial to the welfare of themselves and their families, particularly to their children. As their name suggests, they fulfill their role in the community, by visiting family homes, to give advice and support to all age groups.

They have a key role with regard to safeguarding vulnerable people, as they are often the first experts to enter the homes of individuals at risk of abuse and neglect, especially children.

A check at two years of age is now a major part of the standard provision. If the health visitor suspects that matters are serious enough to warrant child protection measures, it is their responsibility to initiate the process of intervention. The dual role of advice and inspection has made some families wary of health visitors, despite being appreciative of their potential for assistance.

In addition to their early years work, health visitors have now started to run health promotion schemes such as stop-smoking services, and to deliver certain vaccination programmes.

== United Kingdom ==
=== History ===
At the time the health visiting profession began, living conditions for the urban poor were often cramped and extremely insanitary, leading to many business owners sending women around to workers' homes to educate their wives about sanitation and nutrition. The initial focus of health visiting was on families with young children. Visits would cover topics such as sanitation, feeding, nutrition, care, and support to both infants and parents. Typically there would be regular visits throughout a child's early years, to provide routine child development checks. Issues of hygiene, malnutrition, or disease would be corrected with suitable advice and reported to the relevant authorities where appropriate

The role of Health visitors was formalised with the establishment of the Ladies Sanitary Reform Association in 1862. By 1890, some local councils were paying the salaries of Health Visitors.

==== Early twentieth century ====
The role of health visitors was given greater weight following the Notification of Births Acts 1907 and 1915 and the Maternity and Child Welfare Act 1918, which empowered local authorities to establish maternal and child welfare services and led to the first training courses for health visitors. In 1929, health visitors began to be employed by local councils on a statutory basis and since 1974 they have been employed by the National Health Service.

==== Post-war ====
Beginning in 1945, health visitors operating in the UK were required to be Registered Nurses or Midwives who had undertaken further training to work as part of a primary health care team.

In the 1950s, their interventions were made more extensive to ensure they could provide a cradle-to-grave service, working also with the elderly and chronically ill.

In 1959, Elaine Wilkie was appointed tutor at Manchester University, where she launched a community health nursing diploma. This led to the development of a qualification as a state registered nurse and health visitor, which in turn led to the development of the first UK nursing degree in the UK. Wilkie worked at the University of Manchester with Fraser Brockington, Professor of Social and Preventive Medicine. The course started with nine students in 1959.

In 1962, the Health Visiting and Social Work (Training) Act established the Council for the Training of Health Visitors (CTHV) and the Council for Training in Social Work (CTSW). The CTHV comprised 31 members, of whom 14 were appointed by the Minister of Health. In 1970, the title of the CTHV was changed to the Council for the Education and Training of Health Visitors (CETHV).

==== Post-1997 ====
Under the Blair Ministry, rising case-loads were considered to be affecting the potential quality of interventions in young families. As a result, their work was refocused back to young families; the reduced intervention in elderly care has been accompanied by a commensurate rise in admissions of elderly patients to A+E departments and care homes.

After Sure Start was introduced, to provide general early years support to families, the refocusing on young families lead many health visitors to use Sure Start centres as their base. The Healthy Child Programme, published in October 2009, influences the core service available to families, breaking it down into two age groups : firstly the first 5 years, and secondly 5-19 year olds. The latter age group are traditionally dealt with by school nurses - a public health nurse embedded within, or frequenting a school - with health visitors handing over responsibility to them, for a child's development and welfare, once the child starts to attend school.

The 2010 Coalition Government sought to reverse the move towards reducing the scope of health visitors by giving a commitment to recruit more health visitors, to ensure that their caseloads were not negatively impacted. The government's reorganisation of the NHS returned responsibility for public health, at a local level, to local councils once again, with national issues and oversight being provided by Public Health England. Health visitor services will therefore now be commissioned by local councils, in partnership with clinical commissioning groups.

=== Numbers of health visitors ===
In 1977, there were 10,623 health visitors in the UK. In 2015, there were 12,292 in England and Wales, an increase from 10,046 in 2000.

In 2000, there were 297 children under 5 per health visitor, a figure which rose to 419 in 2011.

=== Training ===
In the early days of statutory health visiting, training in the UK was overseen by the Royal Sanitary Institute, who later evolved into the Royal Society for Public Health. Training was later taken over by the government's Ministry of Health, and they are now regulated by the Nursing and Midwifery Council.

Post-qualification, a 1-year full-time (or equivalent part-time) degree or master's level course is required to become a health visitor.

=== Professional body ===
In the United Kingdom, many health visitors are represented professionally by the Community Practitioners and Health Visitors Association, which is part of Unite the Union.

== Sources of further information ==
The Journal of Health Visiting, launched in January 2013, is a monthly peer-reviewed journal for health visitors.

Researchers interested in the history of health visitors may be interested in consulting the Welcome Trust's London's Pulse collection, which provides a digital archive of London's Medical Officer of Health reports, for the period 1848–1972. These reports often referred to the activities of health visitors.
