= Barbara Fawkes =

Barbara Noel Fawkes OBE FRCN
- Born: 1914
- Died: 2002 (aged 87–88)
- Occupation: Nurse leader
- Employer: General Nursing Council

Barbara Noel Fawkes OBE FRCN (25 December 1914 – 4 October 2002) was a British nurse and nursing educator. She served as Chief Education Officer, General Nursing Council for England and Wales from 1959 to 1974.

== Biography ==
Fawkes was born in Tonbridge, Kent on 24 December 1914, to Osborne Pegler Fawkes and his wife Hilda Lascelles. Her father became a farmer and hop grower in Sussex, where the family, including her younger brother and sister, settled. Her mother was a qualified teacher, so taught Fawkes at home until she started school at Tunbridge Wells High School when she was nine years old. She was unable to afford university, so instead turned to nursing.

Beginning her nursing training, first as a pre-nursing student at Middlesex Convalescent Home in 1933, Fawkes went on to train as a nurse at the Middlesex Hospital, London, from 1934. She qualified as a nurse in June 1937, and in 1938, she won the Farndon Memorial Gold Medal, which allowed her to train as a midwife at the hospital without fee. She finished her training within six months, and the following year she moved towards becoming a tutor herself.

She started in Stoke Mandeville Hospital, working in the air raid casualty ward, and was appointed the principal of the Macdonald Buchanan School of Nursing in 1946, even though she was the youngest member of staff. There she introduced changes in the education system of nurses, splitting students time between the classroom and on the ward, advocating similar changes elsewhere.

In 1952 she received a Red Cross scholarship to study education and administration at Columbia University, where she was graduated, earning her B.Sc. She went on to tour Commonwealth hospitals in Canada, Australia and New Zealand. She left the Middlesex Hospital in 1956 to begin her career in nursing education, which she began as chief education officer with the General Nursing Council, from which she retired in 1974.

Between 1961 and 1963 Fawkes was a member of the influential Platt Committee on Nursing Education for the Royal College of Nursing, led by Harry Platt which published as the Platt Report 1964.

Fawkes was appointed an Officer of the Order of the British Empire. She died in Sussex on 4 October 2002, and a memorial was subsequently held at Middlesex Hospital.

== Affiliations ==
- Member, Central Health Service Council
- Member, Council for Academic Awards
- UK representative, Council of Europe from 1958 to 1967
- Royal College of Nursing representative/vice-chair, Western European Group, 1958–1978
- Member (24 years), Council of the Royal College of Nursing
- She was made a Fellow of the Royal College of Nursing in 1976.
- Honorary Fellow, Royal College of Nursing (NSW)
- Life Vice-president, Royal College of Nursing (UK; 1975)
- Officer of the Order of the British Empire (OBE; 1975)
