= Margaret Huxley =

English nurse

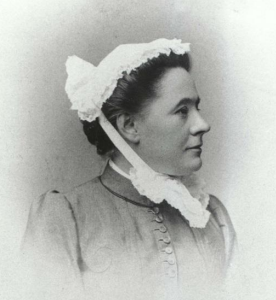
- Born: 21 December 1854; Croydon, Surrey, England
- Died: 10 January 1940
- Known for: nursing training

Margaret Rachel Huxley (1854–1940) was an English nurse who introduced structured, scientific nursing training in Ireland. Her initiatives led to the establishment of the first nursing school in Dublin. She was involved in numerous organisations promoting professionalism in nursing and campaigning for nurse registration throughout the British Isles.

== Early life ==
She was born in Croydon, Surrey on 21 December 1854 to Esther (née Hopkins) and William Thomas Huxley, a railway official who was the brother of the biologist Thomas Henry Huxley. She was inspired by Florence Nightingale's work and decided to become a nurse, even though her family were opposed to this idea. She trained at St Bartholomew's Hospital, London, starting in 1880. Huxley became friends with the matron, Ethel Manson (later Mrs. Bedford Fenwick), and shared her ideas about promoting nursing as a profession.

== Career ==
Her first job was at the Dublin National Eye and Ear Infirmary in 1883. She was soon invited to become Matron and Lady Superintendent at Sir Patrick Dun's Hospital where she started a new scientific training course for nurses leading to an examination. This had such a good effect on the quality of nursing there that Huxley got agreement from the medical establishment that a citywide school should be set up to cater for nurses from all local hospitals. In 1894 the Dublin Metropolitan Technical School for Nurses started its sixty-year life, offering "systematic teaching and uniform examinations". Huxley was its first Honorary Secretary. She "worked wholeheartedly to secure the Higher Education of Nurses" said one report in a nursing journal.

Huxley retired from Sir Patrick Dun's in 1902. One historian has speculated that this may have been a result of a dispute over whether the midwives there were sufficiently well trained to be called "nurses". It may, however, have been simply a wish to move on. At this time she established a "Margaret Huxley memorial medal" for the best nurse in training. Huxley continued her nursing involvement through a private nursing home, Elpis, opened by her in 1890, which catered for middle-class Dublin Protestants. Nurses there were trained at Sir Patrick Dun's and the hospital found that the connection enhanced its reputation. Huxley became Sir Patrick Dun's first woman governor in 1912.

== Post-retirement work ==
After "retiring" in 1902 Huxley had an opportunity to become more involved in a number of organisations which were pressing for state registration for nurses. Her continuing friendship with Ethel Fenwick and other London acquaintances had already seen her become a founder member of the Royal British Nurses' Association (1887), of the Matrons' Council for Great Britain and Ireland (1894) and of the International Council of Nurses (ICN) (1899). She was also a leading figure in the Irish Matrons' Association (founded 1903) and the Irish Nurses' Association (1904). Huxley attended many annual international conferences of the ICN and in 1913, as president of the Irish Nurses' Association, she arranged the first ever professional nurses conference in Dublin: a conference of the National Council of Nurses of Great Britain and Ireland. She was vice-president of the Society for the State Registration of Trained Nurses. and a fellow of the British College of Nurses.

Huxley presented her arguments for state registration of nurses to a House of Commons Select Committee which sat in 1904–1905. She supported regulated standards of education with a formal registration procedure which would prevent untrained nurses from claiming to be qualified, and enable qualified nurses to move more easily between hospitals. The committee's report was sympathetic but the legal framework for registration was not introduced until 1919. Separate legislation for Ireland led to the founding of a General Nursing Council for Ireland in 1920. Huxley became its vice-chairman and also a member of its Registration Committee. She was not a supporter of Irish nationalism, however, taking more interest in international nursing issues, and her leadership roles in Irish nursing did not continue.

Huxley was concerned about public health and housing and believed that an improved domestic environment for poor people would be beneficial to their health. The modest but well-planned houses in Huxley Crescent, Dublin, were built by a trust fund she set up. Her own time and money went into philanthropic projects of this kind. She worked with a Housing Society whose members were drawn from the Unitarian church congregation (which she is believed to have joined around 1912) and provided a "substantial donation". She is remembered with a stained glass window at the Unitarian church in St. Stephen's Green.

During the First World War Huxley worked for the Red Cross and the Voluntary Aid Detachment Hospital in Dublin but refused the honour of a Royal Red Cross for her work: because she disliked "publicity and honours" and was described by her contemporary, Alice Reeves, as a "woman of very simple tastes... unostentatious and self-disciplined". Later she accepted honorary membership of the Finnish Nurses' Association (1925) and an honorary degree from Dublin University in 1928, at which time she was called the "pioneer of scientific nursing in Ireland". She died on 10 January 1940 and her funeral service was at the Unitarian church.
