= Emily MacManus =

Nurse

Emily McManus
- Born: 18 April 1886; Battersea, London
- Died: 22 February 1978 (aged 91); Castlebar, County Mayo, Ireland
- Occupation: Nurse
- Years active: 1908–1946
- Known for: Matron of Guy's Hospital, president of the Royal College of Nursing

Emily Elvira Primrose MacManus, CBE (18 April 1886 – 22 February 1978) was an Irish nurse who served in France during World War I. She was a matron at Bristol Royal Infirmary, then at Guy's Hospital in London, serving at the latter during World War II. She was the president of the Royal College of Nursing from 1942 to 1944.

== Early life ==
MacManus was born in Battersea, London on 18 April 1886, to Leonard Strong McManus and Julia Emily McManus, née Boyd. Her father was the brother of Caroline, wife of Sir Edwin Cooper Perry and son of James and Charlotte McManus, originally from Killeaden, Kiltimagh, County Mayo, Ireland. Though not born in Ireland, her father told her that Killeaden would always be her home. She was the eldest of four surviving children and her siblings were Dermot Arthur (Diarmuid A. MacManus), Sarah and Desmond. Her father was a doctor and two of her aunts were nurses.

She was originally educated by a governess before attending a day school in Nightingale Lane, Clapham and a boarding school near Worthing.

== Career ==
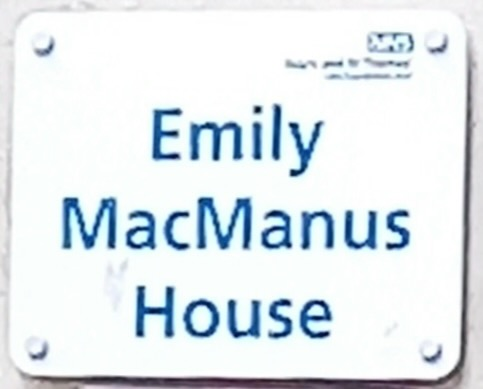
Emily MacManus House, Guy's Hospital, London, UK

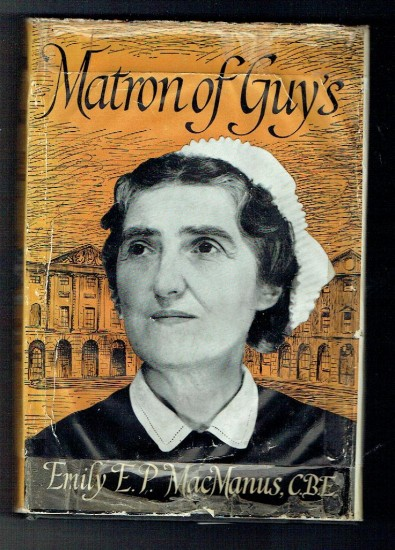
Damaged but repaired cover of the historic book

In 1908 MacManus entered Guy's Hospital in London as a trainee nurse. She received her nursing certificate in 1911 and then trained as a midwife at the East End Mothers' Home in Whitechapel. She passed her midwife exams in May 1912 and went to Cairo as a holiday-relief nurse at the Government Hospital Kasr-el-Aini and the Lady Strangways Hospital at Port Said. She then worked as a private nurse and midwife in Egypt. From spring 1913 she worked at the West Norfolk and Lynn Hospital in King's Lynn. One year later, she returned to Guy's Hospital where she remained until the summer of 1915.

After the start of World War I she served as a nurse on the front lines in France. She joined the Queen Alexandra's Imperial Military Nursing Service Reserve and arrived in France in August 1915, where she would treat injured soldiers in the trenches for 3 1/2 years as a Nursing Reserve Sister. MacManus later wrote in her biography Fifty Years of Nursing - Matron of Guy's, published in 1956, that it was the responsibility of nurses to create homeliness in the "midst of the mud and blood, dust and death, in which they spent most of their days". She was awarded the Royal Red Cross.

In January 1919, she resigned her position at the No. 2 General Hospital in Le Havre and returned to London. She became a member of the College of Nursing, working in administration, and then rejoined Guy's. In 1922, she joined a Medical Research Council project on the impact of nutrition for children's development. The next year, she became matron of Bristol Royal Infirmary and was appointed principal matron for the Territorial Army Nursing Service.

In 1927 she was appointed matron of Guy's Hospital, a position she would hold until her retirement in 1946. She wrote Hospital Administration for Women, which was published in 1934, and co-wrote Nursing in Time of War with Philip Henry Mitchiner in 1939. When World War II started, she organised the evacuation of Guy's to Kent and commuted back and forth from London throughout the war. She was in charge when the Guy's was bombed during the London blitz in 1940. The same year, she went to Dover to see the arrival of the wounded soldiers from Dunkirk.

Throughout her career, MacManus was involved in the National Council of Nurses and the General Nursing Council for England and Wales. She was on the Royal College of Nursing council and was president from 1942 to 1944. In 1930 she was awarded an OBE for her service and in 1947, she was appointed a CBE.

== Later career and death ==
After the end of World War II MacManus was exhausted. She retired from Guy's in 1946 and moved to Mayo. She visited the West Indies in 1947 to assist in an investigation by the Colonial Office on nursing practices in the British colonies, and went to Turkey in 1949 and the Netherlands in 1952 with the British Council.

She published her autobiography, Matron of Guy's, in 1956, and wrote a number of children's stories, including Mary and her Furry Friends, a series which was broadcast by the BBC in 1964.

She appeared as a castaway on the BBC Radio programme Desert Island Discs on 23 May 1966.

MacManus died in the Sacred Heart Hospital in Castlebar, Mayo, on 22 February 1978, aged 91. She was buried in the cemetery of St Michael's Parish Church in Ardnaree, Ballina. In 2007, Guy's Hospital named a building Emily MacManus House in her honour.

== Works ==
- Hospital Administration for Women, 1934, Faber and Faber, London
- Matron of Guy's, London 1956, Andrew Melrose, with a foreword by L. A. G. Strong
