= Cooper Perry =

Sir Edwin Cooper Perry, GCVO (10 September 1856 – 5 December 1938) was a physician and medical administrator who became Vice-Chancellor of the University of London. He played a significant part in the foundation of the College of Nursing, now the Royal College of Nursing, in 1916 and later the London School of Hygiene and Tropical Medicine.

== Early life ==
He was born in Darlaston, West Bromwich, Staffordshire, England on 10 September 1856, the only son of Edwin Cresswell Perry who became a schoolteacher in Castle Bromwich in 1859 and then vicar of Seighford, Staffordshire, in 1861, where Perry spent his early years. A primary school there is named after him.

== Education ==
He was initially educated by his father and then won a scholarship to Eton where he was head of school. He then attended King's College, Cambridge, where he was "senior classic" by obtaining the highest honours in the classical tripos in 1880. He then became a medical student.

== Career ==
In 1883 he was assistant lecturer in medicine at King's and assistant demonstrator of anatomy at Cambridge medical school. In 1885 he joined the London Hospital as house surgeon and qualified MRCS. In 1887 he became assistant physician, demonstrator of anatomy, and then physician at Guy's Hospital and a year later dean of Guy's medical school. In 1889 he helped establish a dental school at Guy's. He was superintendent at Guy's from 1897 to 1920. He was awarded GCVO in 1935 in recognition of services to the Prince of Wales's Hospital Fund. Along with his colleague, Sir Alfred Fripp, he had been knighted in 1903 for service to the Reform Committee of the Royal Army Medical Corps - including the setting-up of the Royal Army Medical College at Millbank, London. From 1900 to 1905 he was a member of the Senate of the University of London representing of the faculty of medicine. He served as vice-chancellor of the university (1917–1919) and from 1920 to 1926 as principal.

== Personal life ==
In 1890 he married Caroline Matilda MacManus of Kiltimagh, Ireland and they had one daughter. His wife died in 1935 and Perry on 5 December 1938 at his home in Worthing, Sussex. After cremation his ashes were buried at the church in his old home at Seighford. Of all Perry's great talents his most important contributions were as an outstanding administrator.

== See also ==
- List of Vice-Chancellors of the University of London

Academic offices
Preceded by Sir Alfred Pearce Gould KCVO CBE	Vice-Chancellor of the University of London; 1917–1919	Succeeded by Sir Sydney Russell-Wells
