= Matron =

Senior nurse in a hospital

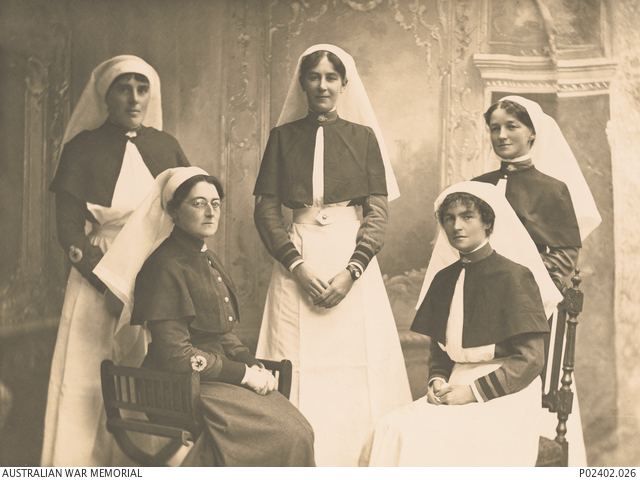
Matron Ethel Gray, seated left, with four of her nurses, 1915

Matron is the job title of a very senior or the chief nurse in a hospital in several countries, including the United Kingdom, and other Commonwealth countries and former colonies.

== Etymology ==
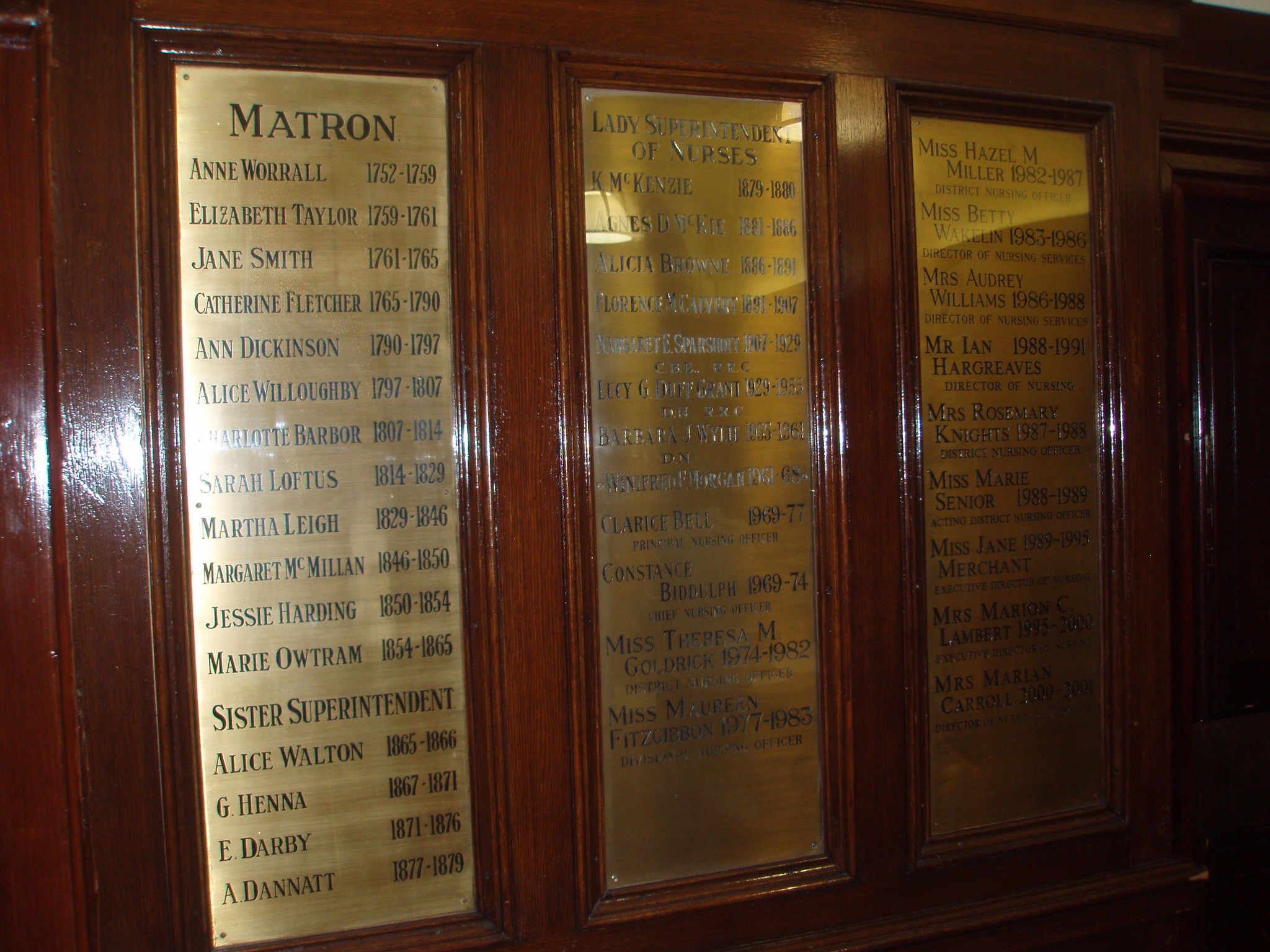
Plaques listing Matrons of Manchester Royal Infirmary

The chief nurse, in other words the person in charge of nursing in a hospital and the head of the nursing staff, is also known as the chief nursing officer or chief nursing executive, senior nursing officer, matron, nursing officer, or clinical nurse manager in UK English; the head nurse or director of nursing in US English, and the nursing superintendent or matron in Indian English, among other countries in the Commonwealth of Nations.

In England, matrons today "have powers over budgets, catering and cleaning as well as being in charge of nurses and doctors" and "have the powers to withhold payments from catering and cleaning services if they don't think they are giving the best service to the NHS." Historically, matrons supervised the hospital as a whole but today, they are in charge of supervising two or three wards.

The chief nurse is a registered nurse who supervises the care of all the patients at a health care facility. The chief nurse is the senior nursing management position in an organization and often holds executive titles like chief nursing officer (CNO), chief nurse executive, or vice-president of nursing. They typically report to the CEO or COO.

In the United States a matron is not a nurse, but a female assistant to males running a residential facility, like a camp, boarding school, or prison (see Other uses, below).

The word "matron" is derived from the Latin for "mother", via French.

== History ==
The title of matron was first used in the 16th century in the United Kingdom (UK) for the housekeeper role in voluntary hospitals. The radical reforms of nursing promoted by Florence Nightingale argued not just that nurses should be trained but that the hospital nursing staff and their training should come under the control of one senior nurse – the matron. The term Lady Superintendent was used in some hospitals in the late 19th century and the position was noted as one with great authority and responsibility. Across the UK the pattern emerged in the late nineteenth and early 20th century in many hospitals, that the matron was the head of: the nursing service; the nurse training; and the hospital housekeeping and lived in the hospital. In some hospitals the matron was responsible directly to the institution's Board of Governors but in others the matron might report to a senior physician or surgeon. Matrons during this period were female. They were often seen as fearsome administrators, but were respected by nurses and doctors alike. The Nightingale model of matron was taken to other countries in the British Empire. Many matrons were active leaders in organizations advocating for the training and registration of nurses in Great Britain and Ireland: the British Nurses' Association (established 1887); The Hospitals Association registration committee (established 1887); The Matrons' Council for Great Britain and Ireland (established 1894); and the College of Nurses Ltd (established 1916).

=== Hospital matrons in the National Health Service (1948–1970) ===
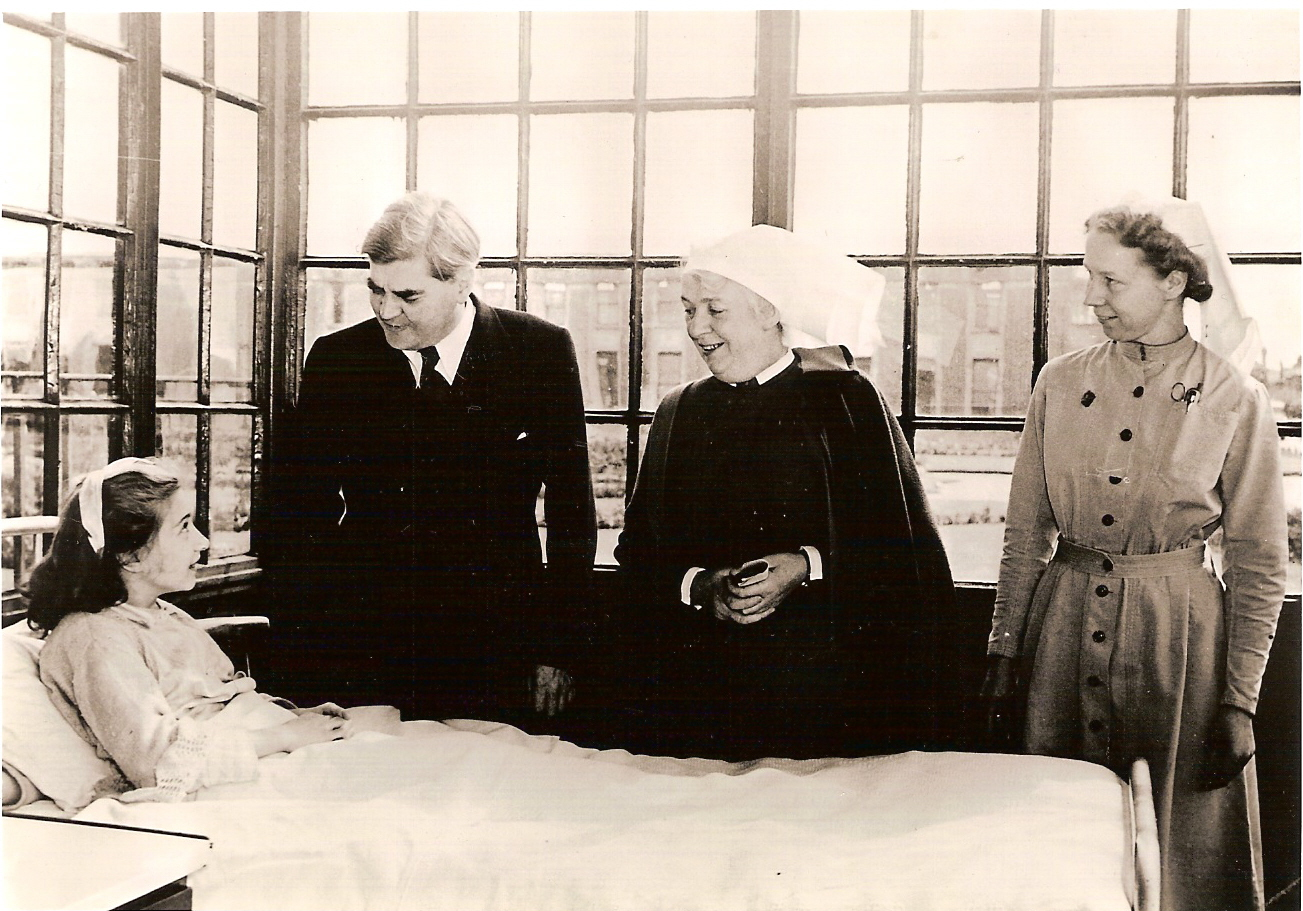
Matron Ann Dolan introducing Aneurin Bevan, Minister of Health, on the first day of the National Health Service, 5th July 1948 at Park Hospital, nr Manchester .

With the advent of the National Health Service (NHS) in 1948, the new administrative arrangements resulted in every hospital having a matron, working in partnership with principal administrative officer and senior doctors in the day-to-day administration of the hospital, and responsible for the nursing service, the training of nurses and some domestic services (although increasingly in the larger hospitals domestic services were largely the responsibility of the principal administrative officer)l. However, hospitals and the services they delivered were becoming more complex . The new NHS administratively grouped hospitals together (sometimes just two but many in to larger groups of up to 20) resulting in the majority of matrons having less contact and influence with the governing body. By the early sixties there were increasing disparities between hospitals in the types, titles, job descriptions and work undertaken by senior nurses, particularly between those with the title' matron'. The Royal College of Nursing (RCN) published a review of the administrative arrangements for nursing in the NHS, arguing that the traditional role of matron was outdated, untenable in the range of duties, inadequately remunerated and increasingly difficult to recruit to. The review also proposed new senior nursing administration structures for the NHS in which the title matron was changed to 'Hospital Nursing Officer' for an individual hospital and the title Chief Nursing Officer to the Board or Group Nursing Officer for the matron on the executive body of the group of hospitals

==== The Salmon Report ====
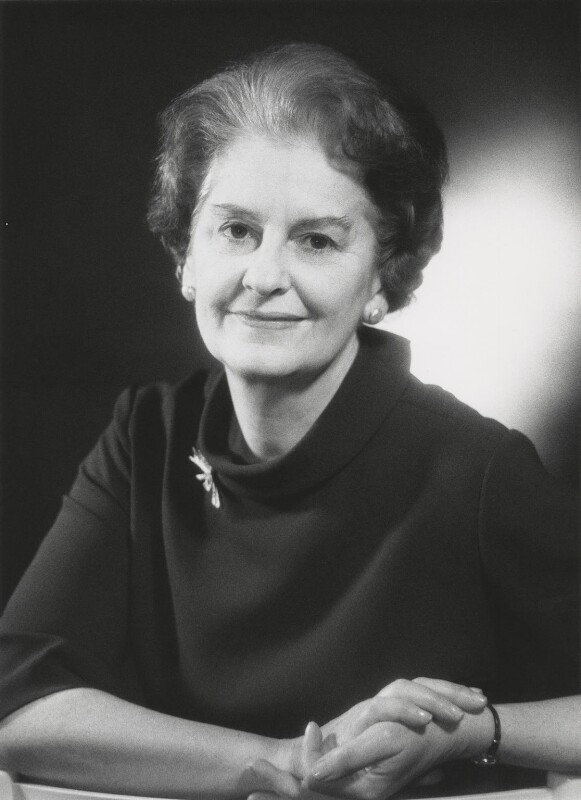
Miss M B Powell (later Dame Muriel Powell) matron and member of the Committee on the Senior Nurse Structure

Following extensive lobbying by the RCN and the Association of Hospital Matrons Enoch Powell MP, the Minister of Health (England and Wales) and Michael Noble, Secretary of State for Scotland, appointed a Committee 'to advise on the senior nursing structure in the hospital (ward sister and above) "p1. The committee was chaired by Brian Salmon, member of the governing body of Westminster Hospital. The appointed members included notable matrons and chief male nurses: Miss M B Powell CBE (matron St. George's Hospital, London); Miss J T Locke OBE (matron the Victoria Infirmary, Glasgow); Eileen Rees (matron Cardiff Royal Infirmary, Cardiff); Miss Grace Margery Westbrook,(matron Southmead Hospital, Bristol); John Greene (nurse) (Chief Male Nurse, Moorhaven Hospital, Ivybridge, South Devon).

The Report of the Committee on Senior Nursing Structure (known as the Salmon Report) was published in 1966 and proposed a new structure for NHS nurse managers which replaced the title matron and chief male nurse with 'chief nursing officer' and created a template job description and pay grade to be used by every NHS organization.

The report's main recommendations on the structure of nursing administration, the change of name from matron to chief nursing officer, the simplified grading structure, and systematic preparation for management responsibility were accepted by the Minister of Health Kenneth Robinson and William Ross, Secretary of State for Scotland. Pilots of the new structures commenced in 1968 and in the same year the Department of Health & Social Security decided to implement the new structure nationally, removing the title 'matron' from the NHS job title lexicon.

==== Hospital matrons in the media ====
Hospital matrons promoted nurses and nursing through the media of radio, newspapers and books e.g. Gwendoline Kirby, matron of Great Ormond Street Hospital, London was a guest on Desert island Discs, Muriel Powell, matron of St George's Hospital London featured in the Star London newspaper in 1958 and spoke regularly on BBC radio and television programmes.

The hospital matron was caricatured in the Ealing Comedy Carry on series in Carry On Nurse in 1959 and Carry On Doctor in 1963 (and gentler portrayals in Carry On Again Doctor and Carry On Matron) and played by Hattie Jacques. The matron usually had a very distinctive uniform, with a dark blue dress (although often of a slightly different colour from those worn by her direct subordinates, the sisters) and an elaborate headdress.

=== Matrons in schools ===
Matrons also worked in boarding schools in the UK from the late-19th century until the 1990s. The term is still used in some British independent schools for the woman in charge of domestic affairs in a boarding house or the school nurse. In the past, the matron was sometimes the wife of the housemaster.

== Contemporary matrons ==
In 2001 the UK Government announced the return of the matron to NHS hospitals in England, electing to call this new breed of nurses "modern matrons," in response to various press complaints of dirty, ineffective hospitals with poorly disciplined staff.

They are not intended to have the same level of responsibility as the old matrons, as they often oversee just one department (therefore a hospital may have many matrons—one for surgery, one for medicine, one for geriatrics, one for the emergency department, etc.) but do have budgetary control regarding catering and cleaning contracts. In larger hospitals some will have a group of wards to manage.

Their managerial powers are more limited, and they spend most of their time on administrative work rather than having direct responsibility for patient care.

Many areas of the UK now employ Community Matrons. The role of this staff group is predominantly clinical and these matrons have a caseload of patients for whom they are clinically responsible. Many of these patients have chronic health conditions such as COPD, Emphysema, and/or palliative conditions which result in multiple hospital admissions. It is the aim of this staff group to treat the patient within the community thereby limiting hospital admissions. This staff group are predominantly nurses, but there are other allied health professionals also in the role such as paramedics and occupational therapists.

The nursing branches of the British Armed Forces have never abandoned the term "Matron", and it is used for male as well as female officers, usually holding the rank of major (or equivalent) or above. It was formerly used as an actual rank in the nursing services.

In South Africa and its former mandated territory South-West Africa (today's Namibia), Matron is the rank of the most senior nurse of a hospital.

== Other uses ==
Long before women were commonly employed as fully sworn police officers, many police forces employed uniformed women with limited powers to search and attend to female prisoners and deal with matters specifically affecting women and children. These female officers were often known as "police matrons". Officers in women's prisons sometimes also used the title of "matron"; sometimes the matron was a senior officer who supervised the other wardresses.

Institutions such as children's homes and workhouses were also run by matrons. The matron of a workhouse was very often the wife of the master and looked after the domestic affairs of the establishment. This was, in fact, the original meaning of the term. Its use in hospitals was borrowed from workhouses.

In the Church of Jesus Christ of Latter-day Saints, the female spouse of a temple president or his counselors is referred to as a temple matron.

In New York City, movie theater matrons were employed beginning in 1936 to ensure that children would behave in theaters. They were licensed by the Department of Health until 1943, and the ordinance that required their hiring and selection was formally repealed by the city in 1995.
