= Ann Garriock =

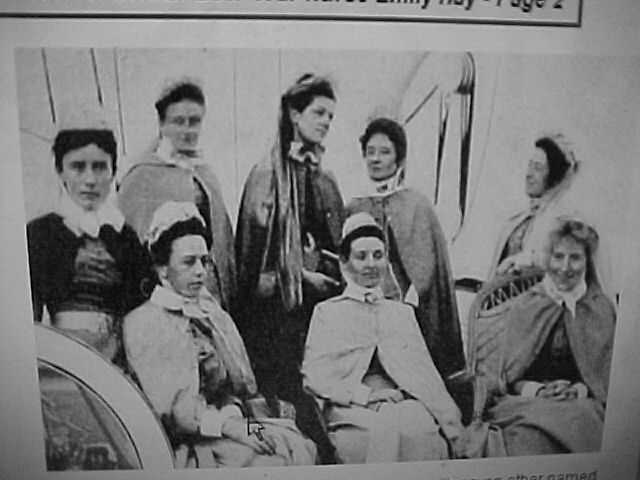
- Born: 1857; Lerwick and Gulberwick, Shetland
- Died: 1929 (aged 71–72); Clewer, Windsor, Berkshire
- Burial place: Englefield Green Cemetery
- Education: The London Hospital
- Occupation: Military Nursing Leader

Ann Garriock RRC (1857-1929) was a military nursing leader and Principal Matron in the Queen Alexandra's Imperial Military Nursing Service. She served in the Second Anglo Boer War.

== Early life ==
Garriock was born on 11 September 1857 in Lerwick, Shetland to her father William Scott Garriock, a master mariner and her mother Ann Elizabeth. Ann was the third child, and only living daughter of ten children born to her parents. Her only sister was stillborn when Garriock was 11 years old.

== Career ==
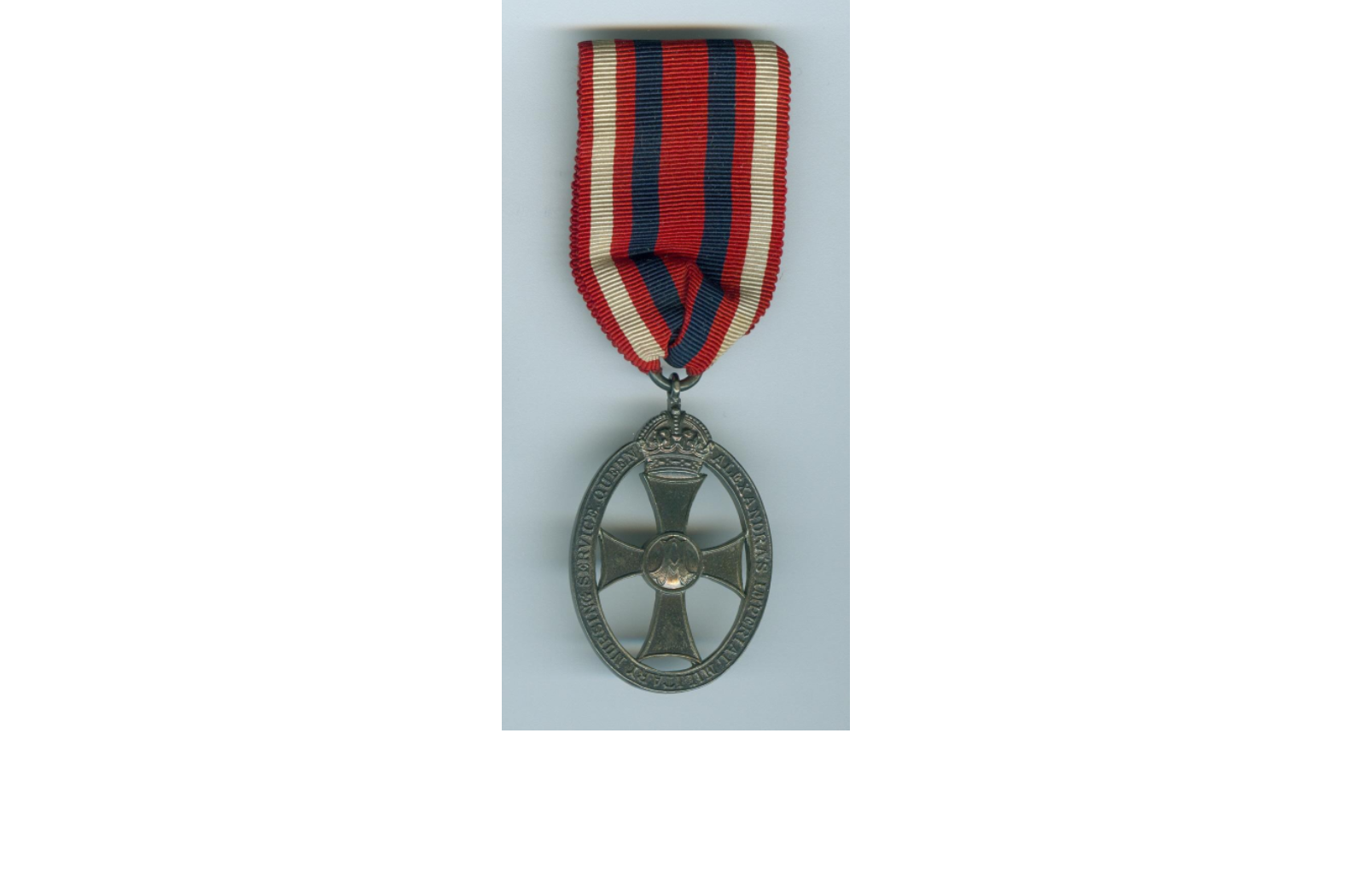
Badge worn by QA nurses on their cape

After training at The London Hospital between 1881-1883 under matron Eva Luckes, Garricok remained at The London as a staff nurse until she joined the Army Nursing Service in 1886.

Garriock served in Netley in 1886, in Malta between 1887-1891, and Devonport between 1891-1898. She was promoted to superintendent in July 1899, and was at the Royal Herbert Hospital, Woolwich when she was ordered to South Africa in September 1899. During the Second Anglo Boer War she was matron in charge of No. 1 General Hospital at Wynberg. She was mentioned in despatches by Earl Roberts in 1901. Following the formation of the Queen Alexandra's Imperial Military Nursing Service in 1902, Garriock was appointed as Matron. In 1907 she was promoted to Principal Matron in South Africa. Whilst inspecting hospitals in her role as Principal Matron, Garriock lost part of her leg / foot in a carriage accident and returned to England to recuperate. After her recovery she returned to South Africa for the final two years of her career.

== Retirement ==
Garriock retired on 21 June 1911. She lived in Egham, until November 1928 when she moved into Hapsden House Nursing Home, Clewer, Windsor because of ill health. She died there on 26 January 1929. Her funeral was held in Egham, Surrey and she was buried in Englefield Green. Her funeral was attended by several military nursing leaders including Matron in Chief Rosabella Osborne, Dame Ann Beadsmore Smith, Matron in Chief TANS and fellow London Hospital trained nurses Dame Sarah Elizabeth Oram and Dame Maude McCarthy.

== Honours ==
Garriock was awarded the Royal Red Cross in 1903.
