= Gertrude Richards =

British nurse (1864–1944)

- Born: 16 September 1864; Nottingham, England
- Died: 18 September 1944 (aged 80); West Bridgford, England
- Military career
- Allegiance: United Kingdom
- Branch: Army Nursing Service
- Service years: 1904–1919
- Rank: Principal Matron
- Unit: Queen Alexandra's Imperial Military Nursing Service
- Conflicts: First World War
- Awards: Commander of the Order of the British Empire; Royal Red Cross

Gertrude Mary Richards CBE RRC (16 September 1864 – 18 September 1944) was a British nurse and military nursing leader during the First World War. She was matron and principal matron in the Queen Alexandra's Imperial Military Nursing Service from 1904 until her retirement in 1919.

== Early life ==
Richards was born in Nottingham on 16 September 1864, and was one of at least six children born to her parents William, a solicitor and mother Harriette.

== Nursing career ==
Richards lived at home until she undertook nurse training at The London Hospital between 1891 and 1893, under Eva Luckes. Richards remained there as a sister until she became matron of Moorfields Hospital in 1899. In 1904 she was appointed as matron in the Queen Alexandra's Imperial Military Nursing Service, and her first posting was to the Royal Herbert Military Hospital in Woolwich. In 1917 Richards became principal matron in the War Office, until her retirement in 1919. She was one of twenty-seven military matrons who served in the First World War and who trained under Eva Luckes, including Sarah Oram, Maud McCarthy and Ethel Becher. In 1917 she joined the Royal College of Nursing.

== Honours ==
Richards was awarded the Royal Red Cross in July 1915 and appointed a Commander of the Order of the British Empire by 1941.

== Personal life ==
After her retirement in 1919, Richards moved back to Nottinghamshire and in 1939 was living with her younger sister, Lily, in West Bridgford.

Richards died on 18 September 1944, and left her estate to her sister Lily.
