= David Lewis Northern Hospital =

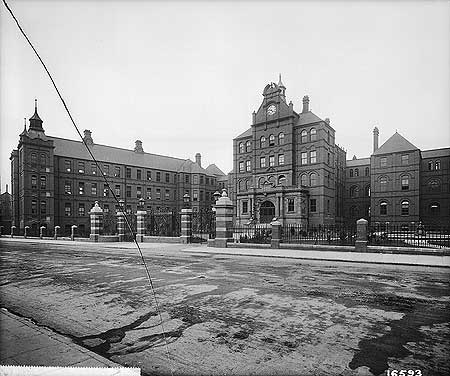
- David Lewis Northern Hospital by Bedford Lemere, 1901.

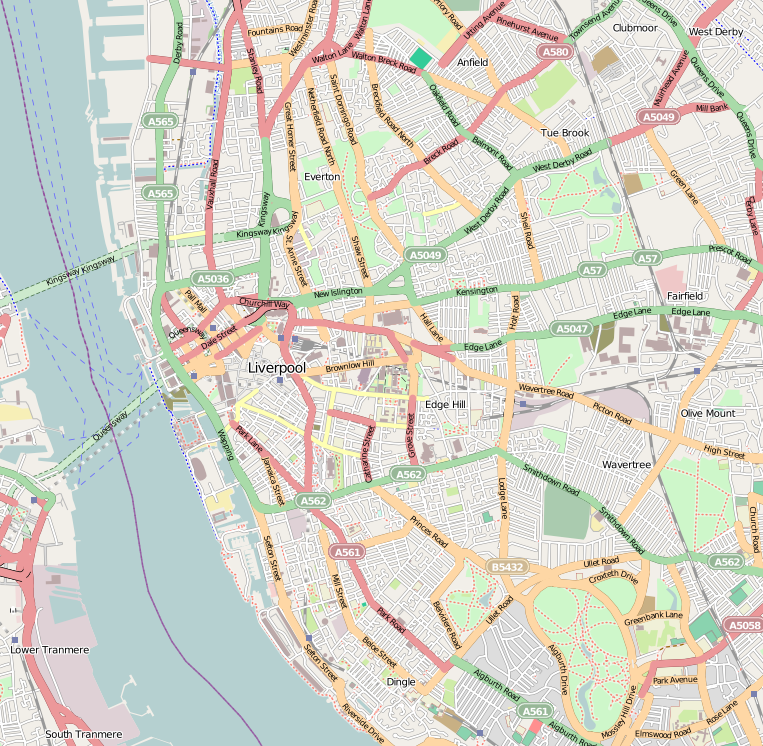
- Location in Liverpool Location in Merseyside

Geography
- Location: Great Howard Street, Liverpool, England
- Coordinates: 53.4144°N 2.9923°W

Organisation
- Care system: Public NHS

History
- Founded: 1841
- Closed: 1978

Links
- Lists: Hospitals in England

The David Lewis Northern Hospital was located in Great Howard Street, Liverpool. It was first established in 1834 and closed in 1978.

== History ==
The hospital had its origins in a facility which was established in Leeds Street to deal with victims of accidents and emergencies in the dock area and which opened as the Northern Hospital in March 1834. It moved to a purpose-built hospital, designed by Edward Welch, in Great Howard Street in September 1845.

The foundation stone for a re-built facility on the same site, financed by the David Lewis Trust, was laid by the Earl of Derby in October 1896 and the new facility was opened by Princess Louise as the David Lewis Northern Hospital in March 1902. It joined the National Health Service in 1948. After services transferred to the Royal Liverpool Hospital, the David Lewis Northern Hospital closed in 1978.

== Notable staff ==
- Annie Croft Godwin Glover (1868–1931), Matron from 1903 until she married in 1914. Glover trained at The London Hospital under Eva Luckes between April 1896 and May 1898. During her training Glover worked in the 1897 Maidstone Typhoid Epidemic. Glover rapidly gained promotion to Sister under Mabel Cave at The Metropolitan Hospital for six months in 1898. She was appointed Matron's Assistant at the Westminster Hospital in 1899 until she became Matron in Liverpool. Glover was also Principal Matron of the Nursing Corps of the South-West Lancashire Territorial Division.
