= Dorking Cottage Hospital =

Healthcare facility in Surrey, United Kingdom

Dorking Cottage Hospital was a healthcare facility in Dorking, Surrey.

== History ==
The hospital was initially opened in between 1863 and 1871 with six beds in order to provide the rural poor with healthcare. The original intention was to include a home for girls and an orphanage, but this did not go ahead. It was rebuilt in 1899 and had seventeen beds and three cots for children. Following the formation of the National Health Service in 1948 the hospital was merged with the former Poor Law Infirmary and became Dorking General Hospital.

== Notable staff ==
At least two matrons who trained at The London Hospital under Eva Luckes ran the nursing department for over fifteen years.

- Jean Anne Farquharson (about 1861– ), Matron between 1899 and 1902, trained between 1895 and 1897.
- Mary Turner ( ), Matron between 1902 and at least 1916. Turner had trained between 1894 and 1896.
