= Mary Pinsent =

Mary 'May' Eliza Pinsent
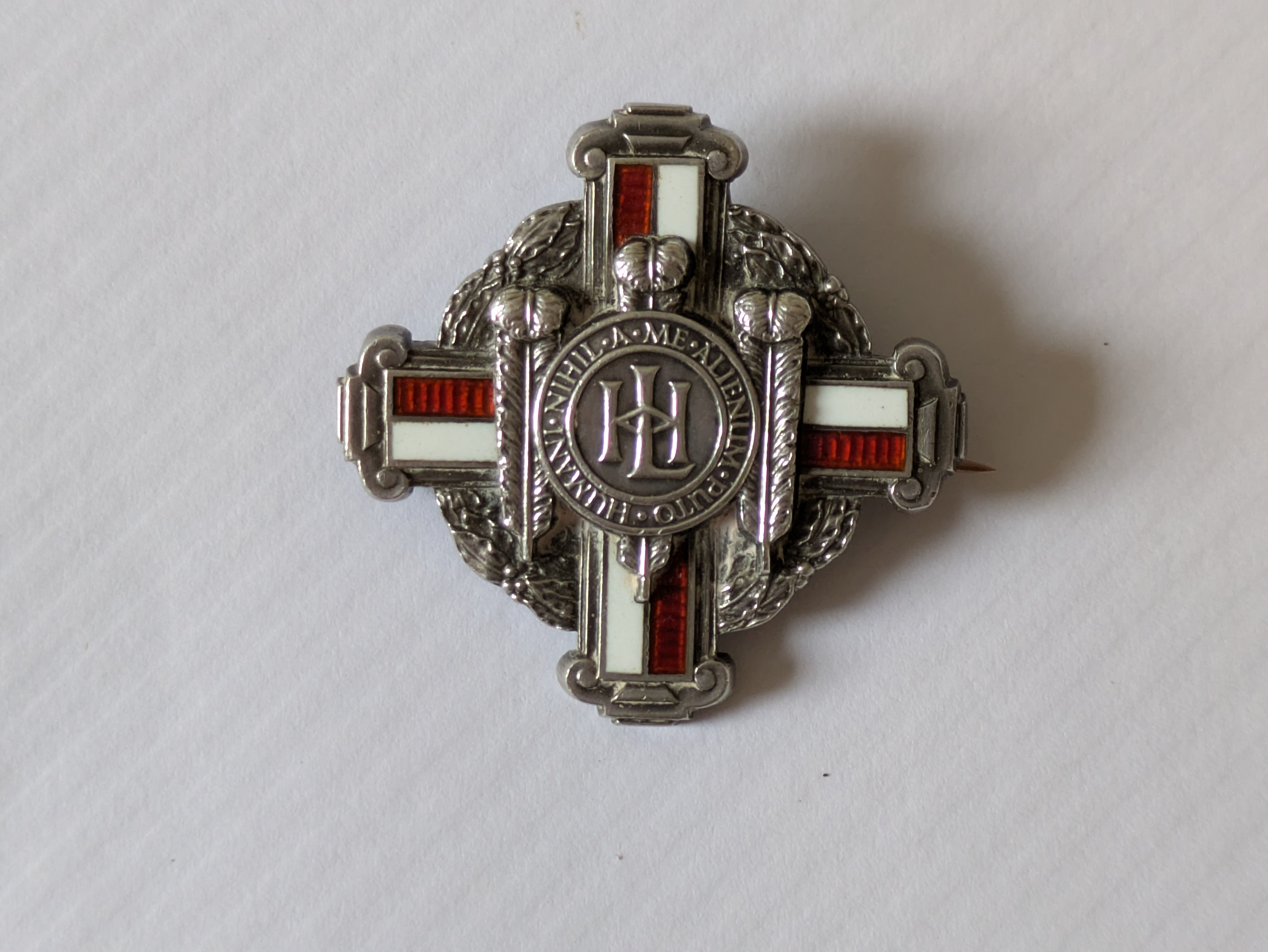
- Badge awarded to nurses who trained at The London Hospital
- Born: 1868; Coombeinteignhead, Devon
- Died: 1960 (aged 91–92); Torquay, Devon
- Education: The London Hospital
- Occupations: Nursing leader and military matron
- Honours: Royal Red Cross

Mary 'May' Elizabeth Pinsent, Royal Red Cross (1868–1960), Matron of the Royal National Orthopaedic Hospital from 1906 to 1933, and military matron during the First World War.

== Early life ==
Pinsent was born on 3 September 1868 in Rocombe, Coombeinteignhead, Devon, to John Pinsent, a farmer, and his wife Catherine, née Whidborne. Pinsent was the second eldest child, and had seven sisters, and one brother. In 1891 she was working as a governess in Liskeard, Cornwall.

== Nursing career ==
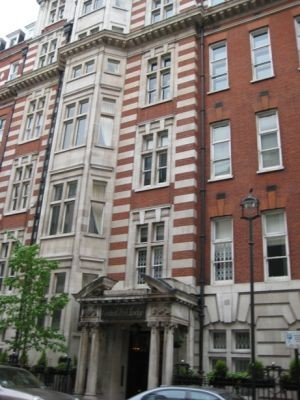
RNOH, London

Pinsent began nurse training at The London Hospital under Eva Luckes in 1896. She completed Preliminary Training first between May- June 1896, and having passed the examinations, transferred to the hospital as a probationer. Pinsent completed her training in 1898, and was appointed as a staff nurse. Ada, one of Pinsent's younger sister's also trained as a nurse at The London, and tragically Ada caught pneumonia, and died on 7 April 1903 before Pinsent could get to her bedside.

In 1900 Pinsent moved to the Royal Orthopaedic Hospital with Lucy Walmsley, and was a ward sister from 1900 to 1903, She was promoted to assistant matron and acting matron from 1904 to 1906, and to matron in 1906. Pinsent had joined the TFNS in 1909, so shortly after the outbreak of war she was called up, and was permitted leave of absence from 1914 to 1919, and served as matron in the Territorial Force Nursing Service (hereafter TFNS) and Queen Alexandra's Imperial Military Nursing Service (Reserve) (hereafter QAIMNSR). She was assistant matron, TFNS, 3rd London General Military Hospital, Wandsworth, 1914–1915. Pinsent was promoted to matron from 1915 to 1916 and worked at Bagthorpe Military Hospital, Nottingham. She asked to transfer to the QAIMNSR and was sent to Alexandria, Egypt, where she ran worked as matron at 19the General Military Hospital until 1918, before she was transferred to an Ambulance Ship, HMS Assaye in November 1918. Whilst in Egypt she worked under the command of Sarah Elizabeth Oram. Pinsent resigned in May 1919, and her dispersal certificate was signed on 11 July 1919. After the war Pinsent had to request that she was reinstated, make a statement, and was present at the board meeting which decided her fate. She returned to the Royal National Orthopaedic Hospital In November 1919, where she remained until her retirement. She was an early member of the College of Nursing (now Royal College of Nursing), and a member of the Matrons Council of Great Britain.

== Honours ==
- Royal Red Cross, presented to her by the Duke of Connaught in Alexandria on 9 March 1918.

== Retirement ==
Pinsent retired to The Grey House, Chudleigh,Devon in 1933, but by 1941 she moved to Torquay, and lived in Sheddon Hall Hotel.

== Death ==
She died in Seaway Nursing Home, Torquay on 21 March 1960, of cerebral degeneration, cerebral thrombosis and arterio-sclerosis. Pinsent left an estate of £10,201, 15 s 3d to her nephew Lionel Read, The First Church of Christ the Scientist, Torquay, and she left £500, and her jewellery to a relative, Kitty May.
