= Lucy Wamsley =

British nurse (1871–1947)

Lucy Wamsley OBE
- Born: Lucy Wilson Wamsley; 1871; Haslingden, Lancashire
- Died: April 16, 1947 (aged 75–76); Bexhill, Sussex
- Occupations: Matron and Lady Inspector

Lucy Wilson Wamsley OBE (1871–16 April 1947) was a hospital matron and Lady Inspector for the Local Government Board. Before the First World War she held the prestigious post of Principal Matron in the Territorial Force Nursing Service for five years and organised and ran the First Northern Military Hospital.

== Early life ==
Wamsley was born in Haslingden, Rossendale, Lancashire, in 1871. She was the second of nine children born to John Maydew Wamsley, a Wesleyan minister, and his wife Jane Elisa. The family moved around during her childhood, and in 1881 they lived in Leeds and in 1891 in Wolverhampton.

== Training ==
Wamsley worked at Birmingham Children's Hospital for two years before moving to The London Hospital, Whitechapel, in 1893. She trained under matron Eva Luckes as a Paying Probationer before completing her training as a Regular Probationer in October 1895.

== Career ==
After Wamsley completed her training she worked at The London as a Holiday Sister; Night Sister and Ward Sister for five years.

In 1900 she was recommended by Luckes as matron to reorganise the nursing department of the failing Royal Orthopaedic Hospital, and took staff including Mary Pinsent with her. She resigned after 18 months. From May 1902 she was Matron of the London Hospital Herman de Stern Convalescent Home in Felixstowe, Suffolk until 1908.

In February 1908 Wamsley was appointed Matron, Royal Victoria Infirmary, Newcastle-upon-Tyne, a post she held until 1913. From 1909 she also held the post of Principal Matron in the Territorial Force Nursing Service until 1913. Wamsley was in charge of the First Northern Hospital, with 120 nurses, which was one of a network of military hospital's established nationwide to provide trained nurses in the event war broke out. She would have been selected for this prestigious and responsible position because of her position as matron of the 280 bedded hospital and leadership skills within the profession. As a Principal Matron she had significant responsibility and would have been in overall charge of the nursing departments in the area.

In about 1913 Wamsley was appointed by John Burns at the Ministry of Health to be a Lady Inspector in the Local Government Board, Scarborough, Yorkshire. Initially she was an Inspector for The Homes of Children who were boarded out, and then she inspected Poor Law Hospitals. Initially she met much opposition, but she is credited with improving the London County Council Hospitals.

Wamsley was an early member of the College of Nursing and joined in 1919, indicating she supported the Registration of Nurses Bill.

== Retirement ==
Wamsley retired in 1937 and took holidays to Switzerland and spent time in South Africa with Louisa Adlam, another London Hospital nurse who was Senior Matron of the Rhodesian Nursing Service.

Wamsley retired to Bexhill, in Sussex, where she died on 16 April 1947.
