= Queen Alexandra's Royal Army Nursing Corps =

Nursing arm of the British Army

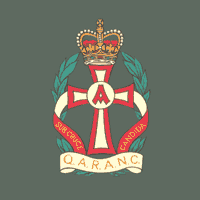
- Cap Badge of the QARANC
- Active: 1949 – 15 November 2024
- Country: United Kingdom
- Branch: British Army
- Role: Medical support
- Part of: Army Medical Services
- Garrison/HQ: Staff College, Camberley
- Nickname: The QAs
- Mottos: Sub cruce candida (Under the White Cross)
- March: Quick: Grey and Scarlet

Commanders
- Colonel-in-Chief: Sophie, Duchess of Edinburgh
- Chief Nursing Officer (Army): Colonel Paul Jackson

Insignia
- Tactical Recognition Flash

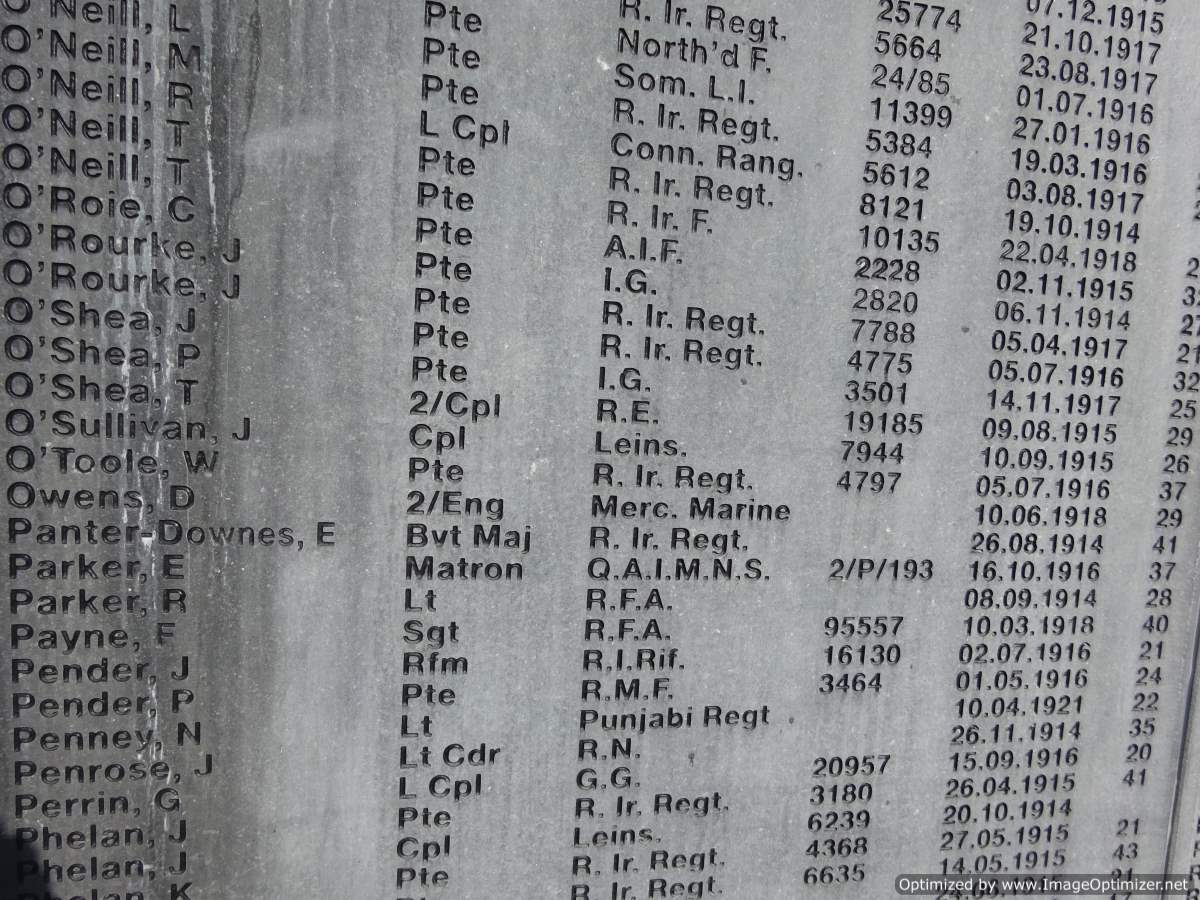
War memorial in Kilkenny, Ireland, listing Matron Elizabeth Kelly Parker (QAIMNS) among First World War deaths; she died of illness contracted while serving in Egypt in 1916.

Queen Alexandra's Royal Army Nursing Corps (QARANC; known as the QAs) was the nursing branch of the British Army Medical Services.

In November 2024, the corps was amalgamated with the Royal Army Medical Corps and Royal Army Dental Corps to form the Royal Army Medical Service.

== History ==
Although an "official" nursing service was not established until 1881, the corps traces its heritage to Florence Nightingale, who was instrumental in lobbying for the support of female military nurses. The Army Nursing Service, which had been established in 1881, and which from 1889 provided Sisters for all Army hospitals with at least 100 beds, had only a small number of nurses in its employ. In 1897, in an effort to have nurses available if needed for war, the service was supplemented by Princess Christian's Army Nursing Service Reserve (PCANSR). Nurses registered for the service and by the beginning of the First Boer War the reserve had around 100 members, but swelled its membership to over 1400 during the conflict. PCANSR eventually became the Queen Alexandra's Imperial Military Nursing Service. On 27 March 1902, Queen Alexandra's Imperial Military Nursing Service (QAIMNS) was established by Royal Warrant, and was named after Queen Alexandra, who became its president. In 1949, the QAIMNS became a corps in the British Army and was renamed as the Queen Alexandra's Royal Army Nursing Corps. Since 1950 the organisation has trained nurses, and in 1992 men were allowed to join.

The associated Queen Alexandra's Royal Army Nursing Corps Association is a registered charity. Queen Alexandra was president from 1902 until her death in 1925. The following year she was succeeded by Queen Mary.

=== Amalgamation ===
The Secretary of State for Defence announced on 15 October 2024, that it will amalgamate with the Royal Army Dental Corps and Royal Army Medical Corps to form one unified corps, the Royal Army Medical Service.

== The Army Nursing Service ==
Five early members of the Army Nursing Service trained at The London Hospital under Eva Luckes, and went onto become Superintendents. They also later served in the QAIMNS.

- May Russell, joined in 1885, promoted in 1893.
- Ann Garriock, joined in 1886, promoted in 1899.
- Sarah Elizabeth Oram, joined in 1886, promoted in 1899.
- Caroline Hutton Potts, joined in 1887, promoted to Acting Superintendent in 1899.
- Sarah Lucy Wilshaw, joined in 1887, promoted to Acting Superintendent in 1900.
- Caroline Hodgson, Matron 1893-1904.

== Queen Alexandra's Imperial Military Nursing Service (QAIMNS) ==
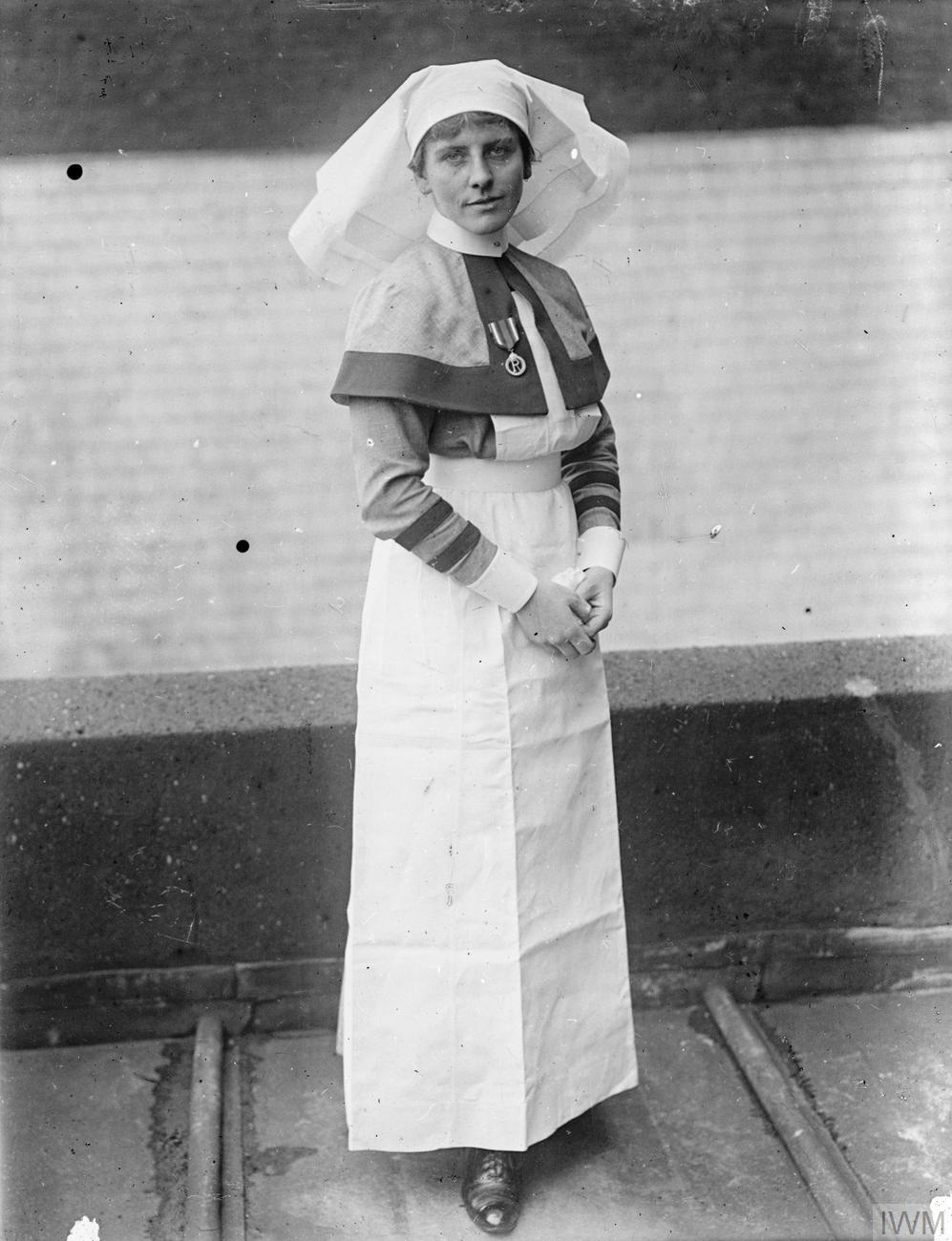
A sister of Queen Alexandra's Imperial Nursing Service Reserve (1917)

When Queen Alexandra's Imperial Nursing Service was formed King Edward VII asked Sir Frederick Treves and Sydney Holland, Chairman of the London Hospital for advice. Holland asked Eva Luckes, Matron of The London Hospital for advice. Several London Hospital supporters were members of the first Army Nursing Board including Sir Frederick Treves; Norah, Lady Roberts; Queen Alexandra – who was a keen supporter and President of The London Hospital from 1904; and London Hospital trained civilian matron of the Westminster Hospital, Mabel Cave. Six of the first 27 matrons and principal matrons had all trained at The London under Eva Luckes.

- Ethel Hope Becher, GBE, RRC and Bar, Principal Matron, 1903, Matron in Chief, War Office, 1910-1919.
- Ann Garriock, RRC, Matron, 1903, Principal Matron - South Africa, 1907-1910.
- Emma Maud McCarthy, GBE, RRC & Bar, DStJ, Matron, 1903, Principal Matron War Office, 1910-1914, Matron in Chief, British Expeditionary Force (BEF), 1914-1919.
- Sarah Elizabeth Oram, DBE, RRC, Matron 1903, Principal Matron -South Africa, 1911-1914, Nursing Inspector and attached to BEF 1914-1915, and Matron in Chief (Acting ) Eastern Mediterranean Force 1915-1919.
- May Russell, RRC, Matron, 1903-1911.
- Caroline Hutton Potts, Matron,1904-1911.
- Gertrude Richards, CBE, RRC, Matron,1904-1919.

== Territorial Force Nursing Service ==
The Territorial Force Nursing Service (TFNS) was originally formed to staff the territorial force hospitals at home, and the majority of its members spent their service during World War I in the United Kingdom, not only in the 25 territorial hospitals, but also in hundreds of auxiliary units throughout the British Isles. Within a short time they were also employed in the eighteen territorial hospitals abroad, and alongside their QAIMNS colleagues in military hospitals, casualty clearing stations and on hospital ships in France and Belgium, Malta, Salonica, Gibraltar, Egypt, Mesopotamia and East Africa.

== Territorial Army Nursing Service ==
The Territorial Army Nursing Service (TANS) was formed in 1920, when the Territorial Force was renamed the Territorial Army. It existed until 1949, when both regular and reserve nurses joined the QARANC. Territorial Army nurses served alongside QAIMNS nurses all over the world, and in all campaigns during World War II.

== Ranks ==
The initial ranking system used by the QAIMNS was as follows.

QAIMNS rank	Equivalent Army rank (from 1941)
Staff Nurse	
Sister	Lieutenant
Senior Sister	Captain
Matron	Major
Principal Matron	Lieutenant-Colonel
Chief Principal Matron	Colonel
Matron-in-Chief	Brigadier

== Senior appointments ==
The Colonel in Chief was The Duchess of Edinburgh GCVO GCStJ CD. The Corps had two Colonels Commandant, Colonel Andrea Lewis RRC, who was appointed in 2023, and Colonel Kevin Davies MBE RRC OStJ TD DL, who was appointed in 2017.

In January 2016 a new post, Chief Nursing Officer (Army), replaced the role of Matron-in-Chief and the Director Army Nursing Services.

== List of Matrons-in-Chief QAIMNS/QARANC ==
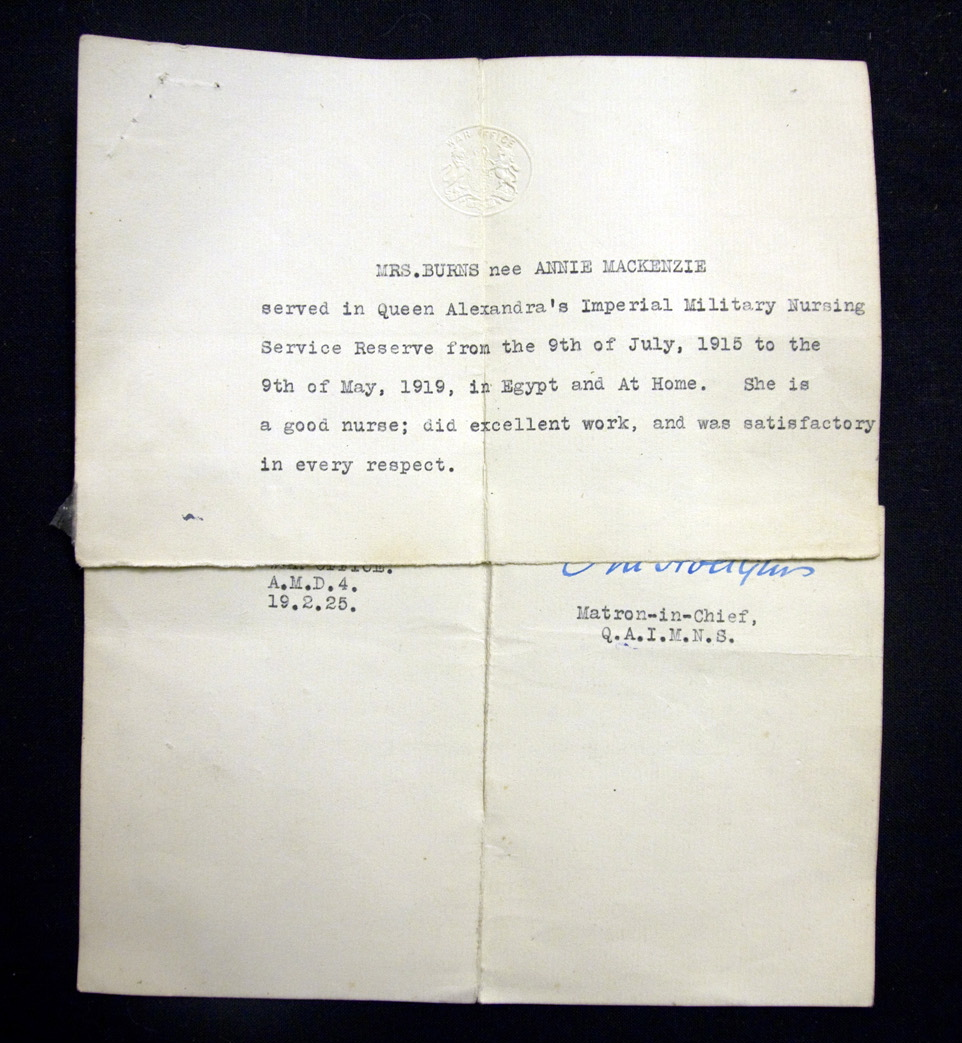
A letter of recommendation signed by the Matron in Chief for a nurse in the QAIMNS Reserve who served from 1915 to 1919 "in Egypt and At Home" (1925)

- Dame Sidney Browne (1902–1906)
- Caroline Keer (1906–1910)
- Dame Ethel Becher (1910–1919)
- Dame Maud McCarthy (1914–1919) (France & Flanders)
- Dame Sarah Oram (1915–1919) (Middle East)
- Beatrice Isabel Jones (1916–1920) for Mesopotamia
- Dame Anne Beadsmore Smith (1919–1924)
- Florence Hodgins (1924–1928)
- Rosabelle Osborne (1928–1930)
- Marguerite Medforth (1930–1934)
- Daisy Martin, 1934–1938)
- Catherine Roy (1938–1940)
- Dame Katharine Jones (1940–1944)
- Dame Louisa Wilkinson (1944–1946)
- Lilian Hunnings (1946–1948)
- Brigadier Dame Anne Thomson (1948–1952)
- Brigadier Dame Helen Gillespie (1952–1956)
- Brigadier Dame Monica Golding (1956–1960)
- Brigadier Dame Barbara Cozens (1960–1964)
- Brigadier Dame Margot Turner (1964–1968)
- Brigadier Barbara Gordon (1968–1973)
- Brigadier Helen Cattanach (1973–1977)
- Brigadier Joan Moriarty (1977–1981)
- Brigadier Vera Rooke (1981–1984)
- Brigadier Rita Hennessy (1985–1989)
- Brigadier Jill Field (1989–1992)
- Brigadier Hilary Dixon-Nuttall (1992–1995)
- Brigadier Jane Arigho (1995–1999)
- Colonel Bridget McEvilly, 1999–2002)
- Colonel Kathy George (2002–2005)
- Colonel John Quinn (2005–2008)
- Colonel Wendy Spencer (2008–2011)
- Colonel Pete Childerley (2011–2013)
- Colonel David Bates (2013–2016)

== List of Chief Nursing Officers (Army) ==
- Colonel Karen J Irvine (January 2016 – January 2018)
- Colonel Alison McCourt (February 2018 – 2019)
- Colonel Alison Farmer (December 2019 – Nov 2022)
- Colonel Paul Jackson (Nov 2022 – Present)

== List of Matrons-in-Chief TFNS/TANS ==
- Dame Sidney Browne (1909–1920)
- Dame Maud McCarthy (1920–1925)
- Dame Anne Beadsmore Smith (1925–1931)
- Rosabelle Osborne (1931–1936)
- Agatha Phillips (1936–1940)

== Queen Alexandra's Imperial Military Nursing Reserve ==
=== Notable nursing staff ===
- Mary Pinsent, RRC, Matron in Alexandria. She was also a matron in the TFNS at the start of the First World War.

== See also ==
=== Other army medical services ===
- Royal Army Medical Corps – Medical arm of the British Army (RAMC)
- Royal Army Veterinary Corps – Veterinary arm of the British Army (RAVC)
- Royal Army Dental Corps – Dental arm of the British Army (RADC)

=== Other armed forces nursing services ===
- Princess Mary's Royal Air Force Nursing Service
- Queen Alexandra's Royal Naval Nursing Service

=== Other UK nursing institutions ===
- Royal College of Nursing – British union for nurses

== Order of precedence ==
Preceded by General Service Corps	Order of Precedence	Succeeded by Royal Corps of Army Music
