= Herbert Murray =

Herbert Murray may refer to:

- Herbert Harley Murray (1829–1904), Scottish colonial governor
- Herbert Frazier Murray (1923–1999), United States federal judge
- Herbert Murray (footballer) (1886–1918), Scottish footballer
- Herbert Leith Murray (1880–1932), professor of obstetrics and gynaecology
