= Georgina Haines =

Georgina Pheobe Herbert Haines RRC
- Born: 1867; Mallow, Co. Cork
- Died: 1959 (aged 91–92); Worthing, Sussex
- Education: The London Hospital
- Occupations: Nurse to King Edward VII and matron

Georgina Phoebe Herbert Haines, R.R.C. (21 June 1867–1959) was a wartime military nursing leader. She nursed King Edward VII during and after his emergency operation for an appendiceal abscess, and became known as the King's Nurse.

== Early life ==
Haines was born in Mallow in County Cork, Ireland in 1868. She was one of at least five children born to Charles Haines, a gentleman farmer, and his wife Anne.

By 1891, Georgina and another sister were living with one of their married brothers, who was a general practitioner and surgeon near St Pancras in London.

== Career ==
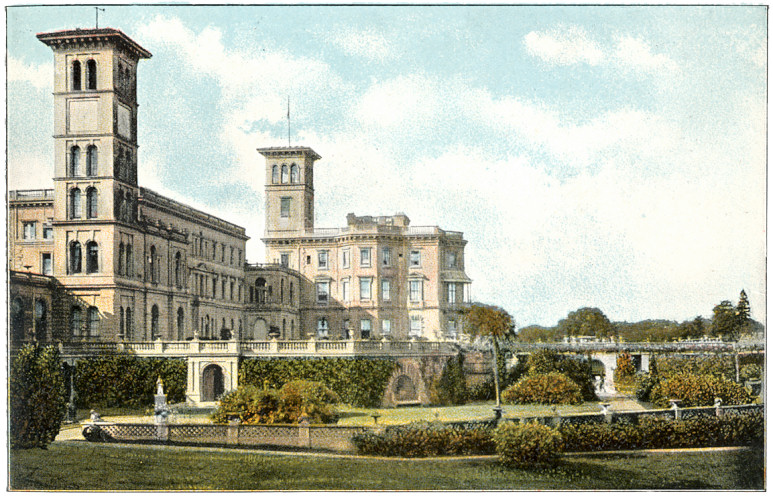
Osborne House c.1910, where the Naval Hospital was based

Haines trained at The London Hospital under Matron Eva Luckes between 1893 and 1896. Haines became a private nurse for The London, and nursed influential individuals including William Amelius Aubrey de Vere Beauclerk, 10th Duke of St Albans, who was a member of the Privy Council.

In 1902, Sir Frederick Treves specifically requested that she care for King Edward VII during an emergency operation for an appendiceal abscess, which delayed his coronation. Haines became known as ‘The King’s Nurse’. She drove in the delayed coronation procession, and went on the royal yacht with the king and Queen Alexandra, patron of The London Hospital.

Later, the king requested that Haines become matron of Osborne House for Naval Officers. She held this post from 1903, and during WW1 until 1917. Whilst she was matron at Osborne House, Haines was awarded the RRC by the king in 'recognition of her special devotion and competency in nursing invalid soldiers of His Majesty's Navy and Army'.

In 1918, Haines was appointed matron of St John's VAD Hospital, a large military hospital in Hull, and worked there until 1919. Later, she opened a nursing home in Bexhill. She was a founding member of the College of Nursing, having joined in 1919.

One of her sisters, Marcella Olive, trained as a nurse in Ireland, and was registrant 601 on the General Register for nurses.

== Retirement and death ==
After her retirement, Haines lived for over twenty years at 43 Littlehampton Road, in Worthing, West Sussex. Her sister Marcella lived a short walk away. Haines died in her home on 23 March 1959. Her funeral was held at The Downs Crematorium in Brighton on 26 March. She left her estate of £8542 to Marcella.
