= Helen Gillespie =

British military nurse (1898–1974)

Dame Helen Gillespie
- Born: Helen Shiels Gillespie; 26 March 1898; Edinburgh, Scotland
- Died: 25 August 1974 (aged 76)
- Military career
- Allegiance: United Kingdom
- Branch: British Army
- Service years: 1927–1961
- Rank: Brigadier
- Commands: Queen Alexandra's Royal Army Nursing Corps (1952–1956)
- Conflicts: Second World War
- Awards: Dame Commander of the Order of the British Empire; Royal Red Cross

Brigadier Dame Helen Shiels Gillespie, DBE, RRC, QHNS (26 March 1898 – 25 August 1974) was a British military nurse, matron and nursing administrator. She served as Matron-in-Chief of Queen Alexandra's Royal Army Nursing Corps from 1952 to 1956, and was Honorary Nursing Sister to The Queen.

== Early life ==
Gillespie was born in Edinburgh, Scotland, on 26 March 1898 to Isabella (née Dunlop) and John Gillespie. She attended George Watson's Ladies' College, before going on to study nursing at the Western Infirmary in Glasgow from 1921 to 1925.

== Nursing career ==
In 1926, Gillespie joined Queen Alexandra's Imperial Military Nursing Service and served in India from 1927 to 1932, and again from 1934 to 1939.

During the Second World War she served in the Middle East and Southeast Asia. After the war she worked in the War Office and the British Army on the Rhine. She was awarded the Royal Red Cross in 1947.

From 1952 until her retirement on 31 July 1956 on completion of her term, Gillespie served as Matron-in-Chief of Queen Alexandra's Royal Army Nursing Corps (QARANC). She was appointed Honorary Nursing Sister to The Queen on 25 June 1952, succeeding Dame Anne Thomson.

Gillespie was appointed a Dame Commander of the Order of the British Empire in 1954.
