= Louisa Wilkinson =

English Matron-in-Chief (1889–1968)

Matron-in-Chief Dame Louisa Wilkinson DBE RRC
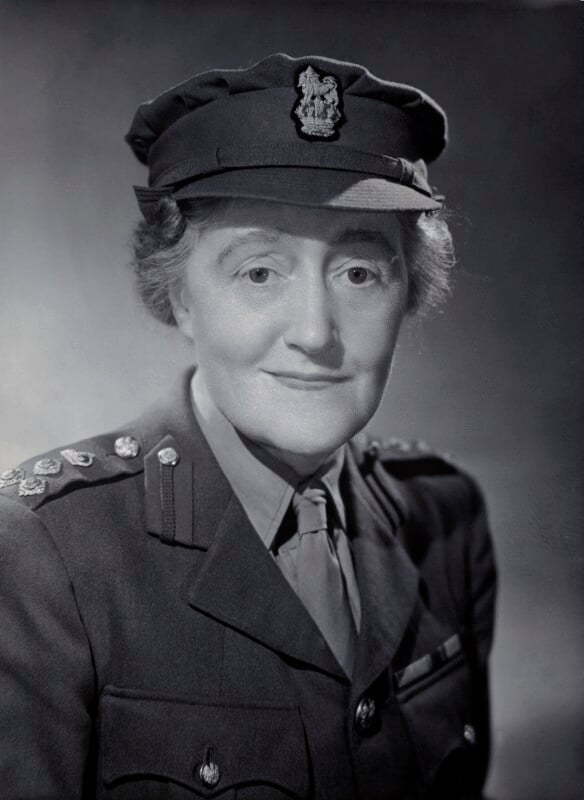
- Wilkinson in 1944
- Born: Louisa Jane Lumsden; 11 December 1889; Sunderland, England
- Died: 4 December 1968 (aged 78); Crowborough, England
- Burial place: Crowborough Garden of Remembrance, Herne Road
- Spouse: Robert John Wilkinson (m. 1917; died 1918)
- Military career
- Allegiance: United Kingdom
- Branch: British Army
- Service years: 1914–1948
- Rank: Matron-in-Chief
- Commands: Queen Alexandra's Imperial Military Nursing Service (1944–48)
- Conflicts: First World War; Second World War
- Awards: Dame Commander of the Order of the British Empire; Royal Red Cross

Dame Louisa Jane Wilkinson, DBE, RRC (née Lumsden; 11 December 1889 – 4 December 1968) was a British military nurse and nursing administrator who served as Matron-in-Chief of the Queen Alexandra's Imperial Military Nursing Service from 1944 to 1948. She founded Queen Alexandra's Royal Army Nursing Corps, and was also president of the Royal College of Nursing.

== Personal life ==
Wilkinson was born Louisa Jane Lumsden in Sunderland, the daughter of merchant seaman James and Louisa (née Benskin) Lumsden. She was educated at Bede Collegiate School in Sunderland and Thornbeck Collegiate School in Darlington. On 20 December 1917, she married Captain Robert John Wilkinson of the Royal Irish Fusiliers at the Fulham register office, but he was killed in action in France on 2 July 1918.

She died in 1968, at age 78, in Crowborough of a coronary thrombosis.

== Nursing career ==
Wilkinson saw service as a nurse during both World Wars. The 22-year-old Lumsden began her nursing training in 1911 at the Royal Infirmary in Sunderland. She had just finished her training when the First World War began in August 1914, and she promptly enlisted as a reserve in Queen Alexandra's Imperial Military Nursing Service (QAIMNS). She served in hospitals in the United Kingdom and Malta prior to her marriage in 1917.

After the First World War, Wilkinson became a regular member of the QAIMNS, starting as a staff nurse in the United Kingdom. In 1926 she was posted to India. During the Second World War, after returning to the United Kingdom, she was principal matron at the War Office, tasked to set up nursing services for the war.

In 1942, Wilkinson went back to India to organise the Indian military nursing services and centres for auxiliary nursing with the rank of Chief Principal Matron. She organised a training programme in nursing for Indian women that included postgraduate training in nursing administration. She was appointed matron-in-chief from 1944 until she retired in 1948, and after retirement was named Colonel Commandant from 1948–50.

DWilkinson was involved in bringing the QAIMNS and the Territorial Army Nursing Service together in 1948 as the Queen Alexandra's Royal Army Nursing Corps. She was the first Controller Commandant until 1954. She also founded the QARANC Association. She was President of the Royal College of Nursing in 1948.

== Honours ==
- 1919: British Empire Medal
- 1919: Associate of the Royal Red Cross (ARRC) second class.
- 1941: Royal Red Cross (RRC) first class
- 1943: Officer of the Order of the British Empire (OBE) for her work in India.
- 1946: Commander of the Order of the British Empire (CBE)
- 1948: Dame Commander of the Order of the British Empire (DBE) military division
