= Maidstone typhoid epidemic =

1897–1898 disease outbreak in Maidstone, England

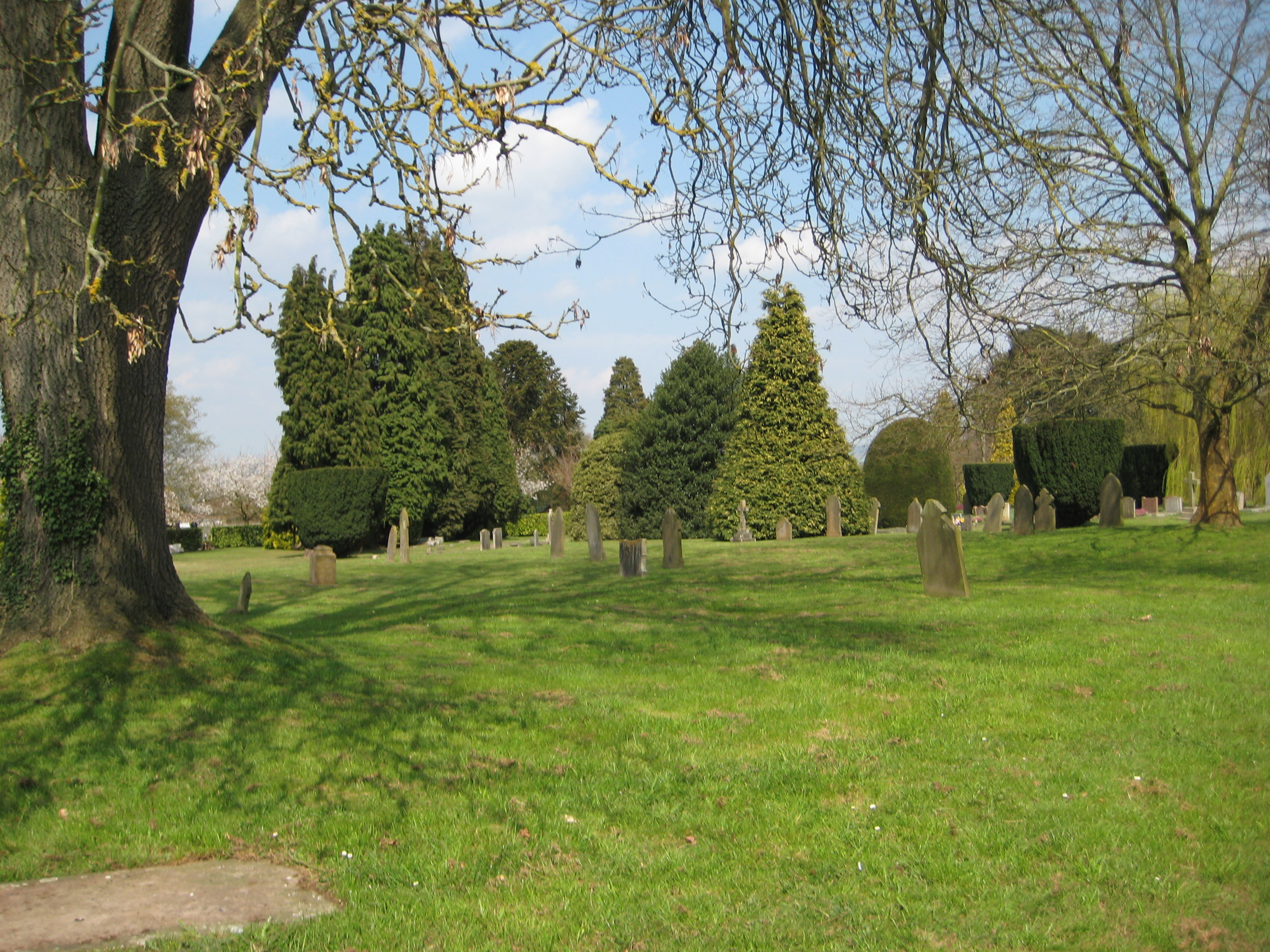
The burial site of many of the people who died from typhoid

The Maidstone typhoid epidemic (11 September 1897 - 29 January 1898), was the largest typhoid epidemic the United Kingdom had experienced. It is considered to have led to critical changes in public health, including the first trials of water chlorination and typhoid vaccinations.

== Context ==
Typhoid is bacterial illness, caused by eating contaminated food or water, or by cross contamination with infected faeces and urine. In 1897, Maidstone had an estimated population of 34,000 people, and at least 1,908 of them caught typhoid. At least 132 people are known to have died, the majority of them dying outside the hospitals. They either died at home or in make- shift temporary hospitals. The epidemic was a ‘...turning point in public health...’; leading to water sterilisation methods by using chlorination. The first immunisations with typhoid vaccine were carried out in Maidstone.

The Board of Inquiry determined that the cause of the outbreak was contaminated water from the Farleigh Springs. The springs were used for the water supply of the town, but typhoid-carrying hop-pickers had deposited their faeces within or near the water. Because the Maidstone Borough Council did not have a sufficient number of nurses to care for the victims, 100 nurses were supplied to the town by the City of London Corporation. Additional nurses arrived as volunteer workers from various areas of the United Kingdom. Queen Victoria donated £50 to the M.T.E. relief fund. She had a personal interest in efforts to combat typhoid, since her husband had died from typhoid in 1861.

== Outbreak ==
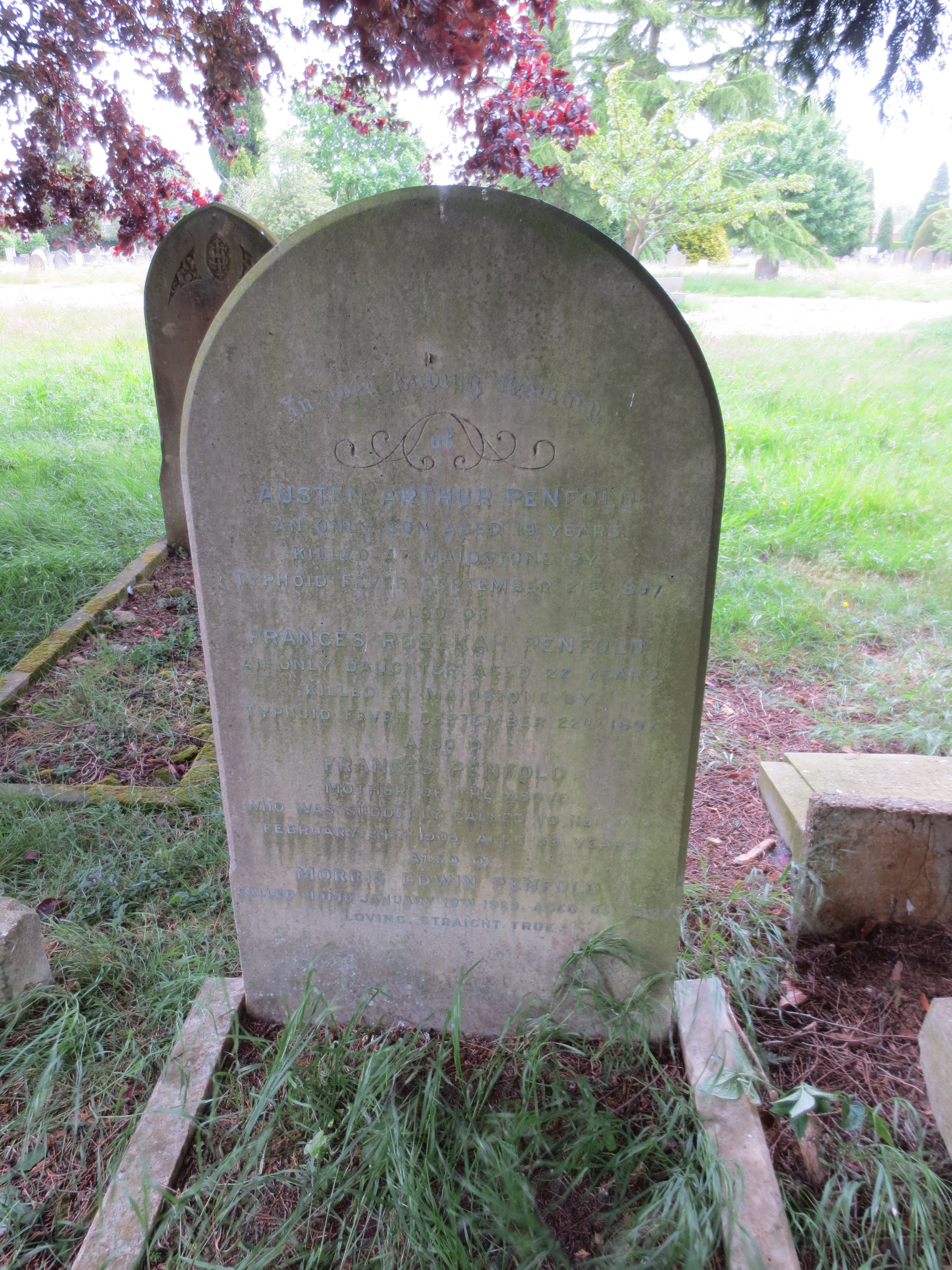
The gravestone of two young adults who died in the epidemic.

At least 132 people are known to have died, the majority dying outside the hospitals- either at home or in make shift temporary hospitals. The medical officer stopped keeping a record of the deaths after early October 1897 so more people may have died. The epidemic was a ‘...turning point in public health...’; during the epidemic trials of water sterilisation using chlorination and the first immunisations with typhoid vaccine were carried out in Maidstone.

The Board of Inquiry which was set up to establish the cause of the epidemic, found that it was due to contaminated water from the Farleigh Springs, one of three springs which supplied Maidstone. This had been contaminated by faeces, deposited by typhoid-carrying hop-pickers camping nearby. It was exacerbated by an increased level of rainfall before the epidemic, which created a high level of subsoil water which in turn contaminated the water supply. The enquiry closed on 19 February 1898.

Maidstone Borough Council was overwhelmed by people with typhoid requiring nursing care and had insufficient nurses to care for the typhoid epidemic victims. The Corporation of London supplied 100 nurses, including Edith Cavell, a probationer from The London Hospital to help in the epidemic. Nurses volunteered from around the United Kingdom, and Eva Luckes, Matron of The London Hospital sent nine probationers including Edith Cavell to work in the epidemic, as well as others from the hospital's Private Nursing Institute. Prominent nurse reformer, Ethel Gordon Fenwick visited the hospitals and wrote about her visits.

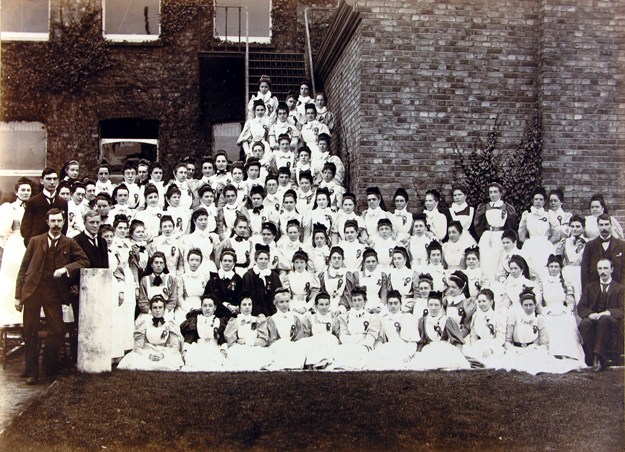
Some of the nurses who worked in the Maidstone Typhoid Epidemic (C) Maidstone Museums

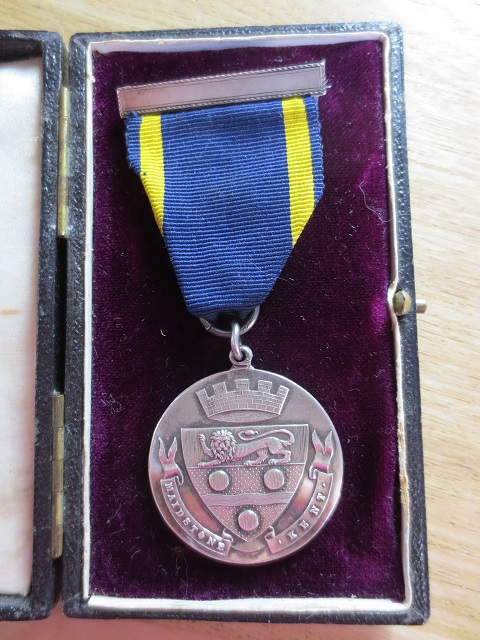
The front of the Maidstone typhoid epidemic medal

The nurses and others who served in the epidemic were either given, or able to purchase a Maidstone typhoid epidemic Medal.

Queen Victoria's husband Prince Albert had died from typhoid in 1861, which may explain her donation of £50 to the M.T.E. relief fund, the equivalent of £5,459.42 as of September 2024.

== Borough of Maidstone Typhoid Emergency Hospitals, 1897-1898 ==
Hospitals were opened in a number of sites. Eleven local buildings were used to accommodate up to 339 people:

Hospital	Number of beds	Date of opening	Date of closure
Public Fever	26	29 September	Open During Inquiry
Tents	12	8 October	Open During Inquiry
Station Road	80	25 September	Open During Inquiry
Wesleyan Schools	35	4 October	6 January
Milton Street Mission	24	6 October	Open During Inquiry
Hedley Street School	17	7 October	8 December
Congregational School	20	11 October	11 December
Perry Street Mission	23	9 October	18 December
Padsole School	37	19 October	24 December
St Michaels School	33	28 October	20 January
St Luke's Mission	32	26 October	6 January

Fig 2: Table Produced for the Local Government Board of Inquiry in to the Maidstone Typhoid Epidemic.

== Staff who worked in the epidemic ==
As well as over 270 nurses members of the Army also worked in the epidemic, as well as volunteer cooks, laundry workers and many others.
