= Catherine Roy =

British Army military nurse (1883-1976)

- Born: 24 January 1883; Drymen, Stirlingshire, Scotland
- Died: 14 August 1976 (aged 93); Helensburgh, Scotland
- Military career
- Allegiance: United Kingdom
- Branch: British Army
- Service years: 1909–1940
- Rank: Matron-in-Chief
- Commands: Queen Alexandra's Imperial Military Nursing Service (1938–1940)
- Conflicts: First World War; Second World War
- Awards: Commander of the Order of the British Empire; Royal Red Cross; Military Medal; Mentioned in Despatches

Catherine Murray Roy, CBE, RRC, MM (24 January 1883 – 14 August 1976) was a decorated Scottish military nurse who served at the front during the First World War. She was later Matron-in-Chief of Queen Alexandra's Imperial Military Nursing Service.

== Early life and education ==
Roy was born on 24 January 1883, one of eight children of Rev. John Roy, minister of the Church of Scotland at Drymen, Stirlingshire. She was educated at Glasgow High School and at Esdaile, Edinburgh. She trained at the Western Infirmary, Glasgow.

== Nursing career ==
Roy joining the regular army as a staff nurse in 1909 and was one of a group of 50 British nurses to be sent to France with the British Expeditionary Force one week after the war started. She served in both France and Belgium and was mentioned in despatches. In 1917, she was awarded the Military Medal for conspicuous gallantry, displayed in the performance of her duties on the occasion of hostile air raids on Casualty Clearing Stations in the field. At the end of the war she was awarded the Royal Red Cross, receiving this honour from King George V at Holyrood Palace, Edinburgh, on 5 July 1920. After the war Roy remained in France to nurse victims of the Spanish flu pandemic.

During the 1920s Roy received several overseas postings, including Hong Kong, Syria and China. From 1934 she was Principal Matron at the War Office, a senior position with a rank equivalent to that of a lieutenant colonel. On 13 April 1938, Roy was appointed Matron-in-Chief of Queen Alexandra's Imperial Military Nursing Service, the most senior nursing role at the War Office with overall charge of the service, and a position she held until 1940. Roy was appointed a Commander of the Order of the British Empire in 1940 for her work during the Second World War.

== Later life ==
In 1940 Roy retired and returned to live in Scotland with her mother and one of her sisters. She enjoyed music and art, and Elizabeth Mary Watt painted a portrait of her wearing her uniform and medals.

In later life she lived in Helensburgh. She died on 14 August 1976 from complications following a fall.
