= Barbara Cozens =

British military nurse and nursing administrator

Dame Barbara Cozens
- Born: 24 December 1906; Darjeeling, British India
- Died: 18 July 1995 (aged 88); Canterbury, England
- Military career
- Allegiance: United Kingdom
- Branch: British Army
- Service years: 1933–1964
- Rank: Brigadier
- Commands: Queen Alexandra's Royal Army Nursing Corps (1960–1964); Army Nursing Corps Training Centre (1955–1958)
- Conflicts: Second World War
- Awards: Dame Commander of the Order of the British Empire; Royal Red Cross; Dame of the Order of St John of Jerusalem

Brigadier Dame Florence Barbara Cozens (24 December 1906 – 18 July 1995) was a British military nurse and nursing administrator.

== Nursing career ==
Born in Darjeeling, India, Cozens received her training and education to become a nurse at the Victoria Hospital for Children, Chelsea, and at St Thomas' Hospital in Stangate, Lambeth, finishing her training in 1933. She joined Queen Alexandra's Imperial Military Nursing Service (QAIMNS) on 3 August 1933 with the rank of staff nurse, and was posted to Cambridge Military Hospital, Aldershot, and later to India for five years. In India, and later in Palestine and Egypt, she nursed military personnel, later returning to England. During the Second World War Cozens served in the United Kingdom and overseas, and was awarded the Associate of the Royal Red Cross in 1943.

Cozens was promoted from senior sister to junior commander on 1 February 1949. She was appointed Commandant of the Army Nursing Corps Training Centre, Aldershot in 1955, awarded the Royal Red Cross in the 1958 New Year Honours, and served as Assistant Director of Army Nursing Services Eastern Command from 1958. Cozens was appointed Matron-in-Chief/Director of Army Nursing Services from 1960. On 23 July that year she was appointed Honorary Nursing Sister to The Queen. She was appointed a Commander of the Order of St John of Jerusalem July 1961, and a Dame Commander of the Order of the British Empire in the 1963 New Year Honours. Cozens relinquished her appointment as Matron-in-Chief on 27 July 1964, and retired from the Queen Alexandra's Royal Army Nursing Corps on 24 August.

Cozens served as Chief Nursing Officer to the St John Ambulance Brigade in 1965–1966, and was appointed Colonel Commandant of the Queen Alexandra's Royal Army Nursing Corps on 31 July 1966. On 24 December 1966, having attained the age limit, she ceased to belong to the Regular Army Reserve of Officers, but retained the rank of brigadier. Her tenure as Colonel Commandant expired on 31 July 1969. She was advanced to a Dame of the Order of St John of Jerusalem in June 1971.

== Personal life ==
Never married, she retired to Canterbury, where she died in 1995, aged 88.
