= Helen Cattanach =

British nursing administrator

- Photographic portrait by Bassano, 1976
- Born: 21 June 1920; Knockando, Morayshire, Scotland
- Died: 4 May 1994 (aged 73)
- Military career
- Allegiance: United Kingdom
- Branch: British Army
- Service years: 1945–1977
- Rank: Brigadier
- Commands: Queen Alexandra's Royal Army Nursing Corps (1973–1977)
- Conflicts: Second World War
- Awards: Companion of the Order of the Bath; Royal Red Cross; Commander of the Order of St John

Brigadier Helen Cattanach, CB, RRC, CStJ (21 June 1920 – 4 May 1994) was a British military nurse and nursing administrator who served as Director of British Army Nursing Services (DANS) and Matron-in-Chief of Queen Alexandra's Royal Army Nursing Corps from 1973 to 1977.

== Early life ==
Helen Cattanach was born in Knockando, Morayshire, Scotland, to Francis and Marjory (née Grant) Cattanach on 21 June 1920. She was educated at the Elgin Academy, before travelling to Aberdeen to study nursing at Woodend Hospital.

== Nursing career ==
Having completed her training as a State Registered Nurse, Cattanach's military career began during the hostilities of the Second World War when she joined the Civil Nursing Reserve. She became a regular nursing sister in Queen Alexandra's Imperial Military Nursing Service (QAIMNS) in 1946, having spent the period from June 1945 as a reserve in the corps.

From 1958 Cattanach was posted to the War Office, initially as a Staff Officer with the Army Medical Directorate and then, in 1961, as the first officer from the Queen Alexandra's Corps to serve in the recruiting branch. After fulfilling the recruitment role "with great enthusiasm", she returned to nursing as a ward sister in Hong Kong. She was awarded the Royal Red Cross in 1963.

Cattanach was promoted to matron and served at the British Military Hospital in Münster in 1968 and the Cambridge Military Hospital, Aldershot from 1969. Made an Officer of the Venerable Order of Saint John in 1971, she was promoted to brigadier and appointed Matron-in-Chief and Director of Army Nursing Services in 1972. This was the highest rank available to women in the British Army. She was appointed a Companion of the Order of the Bath in the 1976 New Year Honours and advanced to Commander of the Venerable Order of Saint John in 1977, before retiring from the army later that year.

The National Portrait Gallery, London, holds seven photographic portraits of Helen Cattanach in its collection, taken by Bassano on 31 December 1976.

== Retirement ==
Cattanach retired to Woking, Surrey, where she was engaged in charity work. She was appointed Colonel Commandant of Queen Alexandra's Royal Army Nursing Corps from June 1978.

Cattanach, a life member of the Clan Macpherson Association, died on 4 May 1994, aged 73. Her obituary appeared in the Gazette of the Queen Alexandra's Royal Army Nursing Corps Association, vol. 10, #11.
