= Anne Thomson =

British military nurse, matron and nursing administrator

Dame Anne Thomson DBE, RRC
- Military career
- Allegiance: United Kingdom
- Branch: British Army
- Rank: Brigadier
- Commands: Queen Alexandra's Royal Army Nursing Corps (1948–52)
- Conflicts: First World War; Second World War
- Awards: Dame Commander of the Order of the British Empire; Royal Red Cross

Brigadier Dame Anne Thomson, DBE, RRC was a British military nurse, matron and nursing administrator. She was Matron-in-Chief of Queen Alexandra's Royal Army Nursing Corps (QARANC) from 1948 to 31 January 1949, and Director of Army Nursing Services from 1 February 1949 to 1952. She was succeeded by Dame Helen Gillespie.

Anne Thomson was the first officer of Queen Alexandra's Imperial Military Nursing Service to reach the rank of brigadier in the British Army, which she did in 1950. Four years later, she was named a Colonel Commandant of the QARANC on 12 December 1954. She also held the title of King's Honorary Nursing Sister (KHNS).
