= Katharine Jones =

British nursing officer (1888–1967)

Dame Katharine Jones DBE RRC
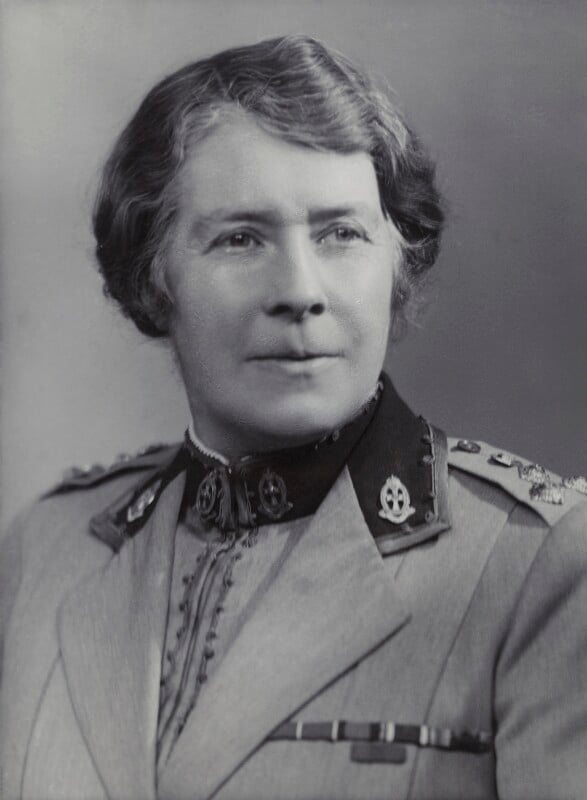
- Jones in 1943
- Born: Katharine Henrietta Jones; 3 February 1888; Berhampore, Bengal, British India
- Died: 29 December 1967 (aged 79); Chiswick, London, England
- Military career
- Allegiance: United Kingdom
- Branch: British Army
- Service years: 1917–c. 1944
- Rank: Matron-in-Chief
- Commands: Queen Alexandra’s Imperial Military Nursing Service (1940–1944)
- Conflicts: First World War; Arab revolt in Palestine; Second World War
- Awards: Dame Commander of the Order of the British Empire; Royal Red Cross & Bar; Mentioned in Despatches

Dame Katharine Henrietta Jones DBE, RRC & Bar (3 February 1888 – 29 December 1967) was Matron-in-Chief of Queen Alexandra's Imperial Military Nursing Service (QAIMNS) for most of the Second World War, serving from 23 July 1940 to 1944.

During the First World War, she trained as a nurse at St Bartholomew's Hospital, London, later joining Queen Alexandra's Imperial Military Nursing Service (QAIMNS) in 1917, which she rejoined in 1937. Jones was mentioned in despatches, while serving in Palestine. In 1938, she returned to Britain where she was appointed the Principal Matron at the War Office.

In 1939, the Second World War was declared and Jones mobilised more than 1000 QAs to France to serve with the British Expeditionary Force (BEF). Along with the British Army the QAs retreated from Dunkirk on 26 May 1940; all were safely returned to England. In July 1940, aged 44, Jones was promoted to Matron in Chief of the QAIMNS.

As Matron in Chief of the QAIMNS, Jones wrote the introduction to Grey and Scarlet, a collection of letters sent to her by Nursing Sisters of the Queen Alexandra's Imperial Military Nursing Service and Territorial Army Nursing Service from France, Iceland, Tobruk, Sudan, Eritrea, Gibraltar, Greece, Middle East, North Africa, Malta, Malaya and Singapore.

== Death ==
She died at St. Mary's Guest House, Burlington Lane, Chiswick, London, on 29 December 1967.
