= Monica Golding =

British Army nurse and nursing administrator

Dame Monica Golding
- Golding in 1960
- Born: Cecilie Monica Johnson; 6 August 1902; Chiswick, England
- Died: 6 June 1997 (aged 94); Bournemouth, England
- Military career
- Allegiance: United Kingdom
- Branch: British Army
- Rank: Brigadier
- Commands: Queen Alexandra's Royal Army Nursing Corps (1956–60)
- Conflicts: Second World War
- Awards: Dame Commander of the Order of the British Empire

Brigadier Dame Cecilie Monica Golding, DBE (née Johnson; 6 August 1902 – 6 June 1997) was a British Army nurse and nursing administrator who rose to colone commandant, matron-in-chief and director of the Queen Alexandra's Royal Army Nursing Corps (QARANC).

== Nursing career ==
Golding began her nursing career at the Royal Surrey County Hospital, Guildford, in 1922. Three years later she relocated to Aldershot for midwifery training. During Christmas 1939, she found herself in Northern France as Matron of No. 3 Casualty Clearing Station.

Following the Second World War, Golding served in India as Principal Matron, the last sister of the Queen Alexandra's Imperial Military Nursing Service to serve there. In 1950 was served in Singapore as Matron for Queen Alexandra's Royal Army Nursing Corps (QARANC). As Director of Army Nursing Services, she represented the corps on many great occasions, but one of her proudest moments was attending a dinner offered by the army to Queen Elizabeth II after her accession to the throne in 1952.

It had been more than a century since a banquet of such military magnitude had been held. Present were most members of the Royal Family, and more than 100 generals. She supervised the design of a new QA mess dress and it was worn for the first time on this evening. During her term of office she witnessed the marriage of the Colonel-in-Chief, Princess Margaret and the opening of the new QARANC Training Centre in Aldershot.

Golding was appointed a Dame Commander of the Order of the British Empire in 1958, and retired in 1960.

== Personal life ==
She married Brigadier the Rev Harry Golding, OBE in 1961; they were married until his death in 1969. Golding had two daughters to whom she was stepmother.

Dame Monica Johnson Golding died in Bournemouth on 6 June 1997, aged 94.
