= Herbert Leith Murray =

Herbert Leith Murray FRCOG (1880–1932) was professor of obstetrics and gynaecology at the University of Liverpool. He was on the staff of the Liverpool Maternity Hospital and the David Lewis Northern Hospital. He was a foundation fellow of the Royal College of Obstetricians and Gynaecologists. He served with the Royal Navy Volunteer Reserve from 1909 and during the First World War and achieved the rank of Surgeon Captain.
