= Ethel Becher =

British nurse (1867–1948)

Matron-in-Chief Dame Ethel Becher GBE RRC*
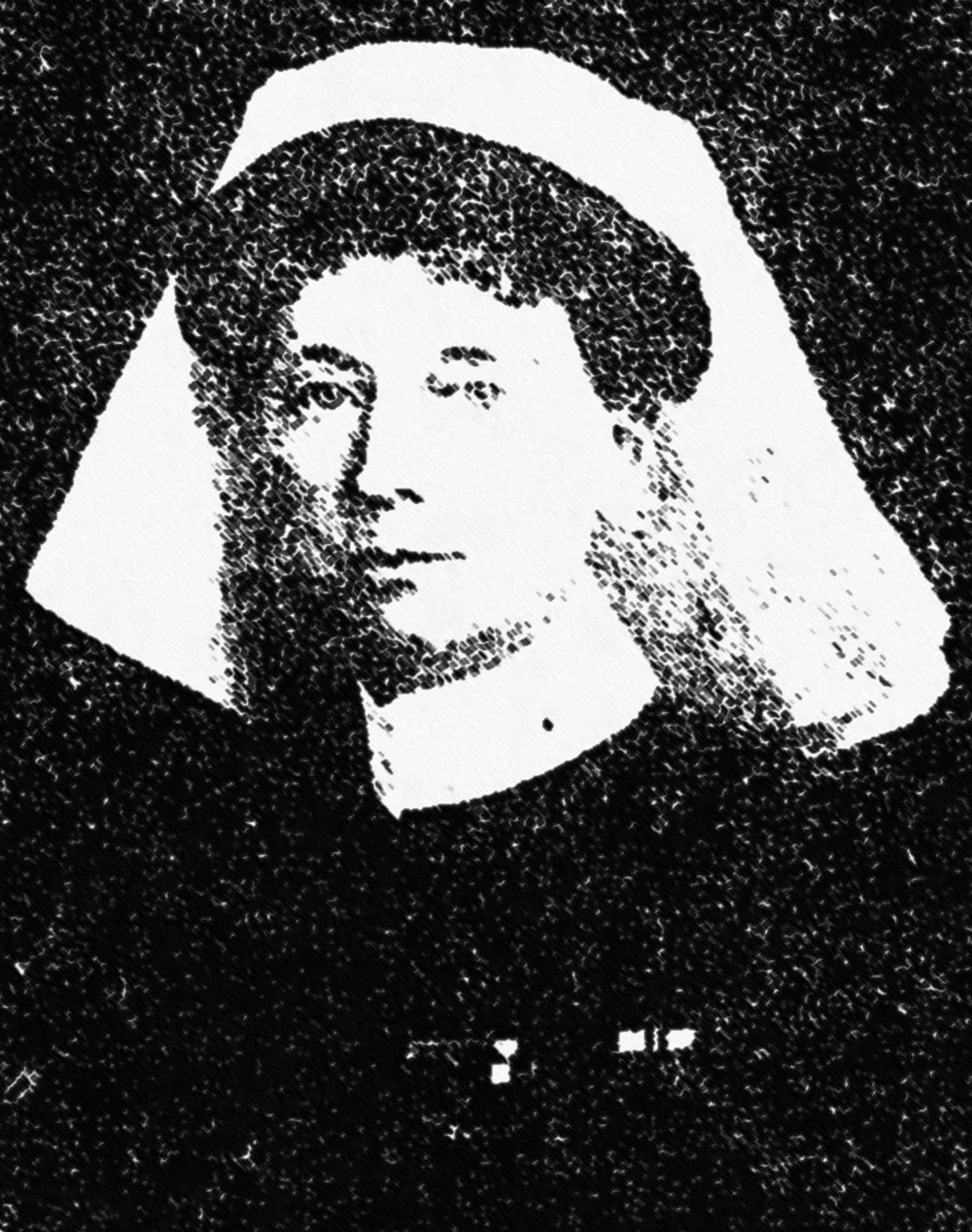
- Becher in 1919
- Born: 1867
- Died: 10 May 1948 (aged 80–81)
- Military career
- Allegiance: United Kingdom
- Branch: British Army
- Service years: 1899–1919
- Rank: Matron-in-Chief
- Commands: Queen Alexandra's Royal Army Nursing Corps (1910–1919)
- Conflicts: Second Boer War; First World War
- Awards: Dame Grand Cross of the Order of the British Empire; Royal Red Cross & Bar; Lady of Grace of the Order of Saint John

Dame Ethel Hope Becher, GBE, RRC & Bar (1867 – 10 May 1948) was a British nurse who served in the War Office as matron-in-chief of the Queen Alexandra's Royal Army Nursing Corps from 1910 to 1919.

== Early life ==
Ethel Hope Becher was born in 1867. Her father was Arthur W. Becher, a colonel in the Bengal Staff Corps. She attended private school and trained as a nurse at the London Hospital from 1893 to 1899 under Eva Luckes.

== Career ==
In 1899, she became a nursing sister and acting matron during the Second Boer War, and was awarded the Royal Red Cross for her work. Becher was one of a group of six nurses from The London Hospital who were specially selected by Eva Luckes and Sydney Holland at Princess Alexandra's request to go out and nurse diseased and injured troops in South Africa.

In 1903, Becher was appointed as principal matron of the Queen Alexandra's Imperial Military Nursing Service (later the Queen Alexandra's Royal Army Nursing Corps, the nursing branch of the British Army, which had been established by royal warrant just one year prior. She was promoted to matron-in-chief in 1910, succeeding Caroline Keer in the role, and was stationed at the War Office.

As matron-in-chief, she was responsible for the recruiting and administration of the entire nursing service, and oversaw nurses stationed in many regions, including Macedonia, Malta, Gibraltar, and France. Becher almost retired at the start of the First World War in 1914, but decided to stay on.

== Service during World War I ==
She supervised over 10,000 nurses and 9,500 members of the Voluntary Aid Detachment from 1914 to 1918. She was named a Lady of Grace of the Order of Saint John in 1917, and was awarded a Bar to her Royal Red Cross in January 1918, becoming the first person to receive the award twice. She was appointed a Dame Grand Cross of the Order of the British Empire in June 1918.

After the end of the war, Becher resigned her position as matron-in-chief in March 1919. The media described her as a "modern Florence Nightingale" and wrote that it "would be hard to name any one woman whose part in the great war was more extraordinary".

In 1931, Becher founded the United Services Nursing Club, which organised the provision of government grants to nurses who had served in the First World War.

Ethel Becher died on 10 May 1948.
