= Anne Beadsmore Smith =

British nurse and British Army officer

Matron-in-Chief Dame Anne Beadsmore Smith DBE RRC*
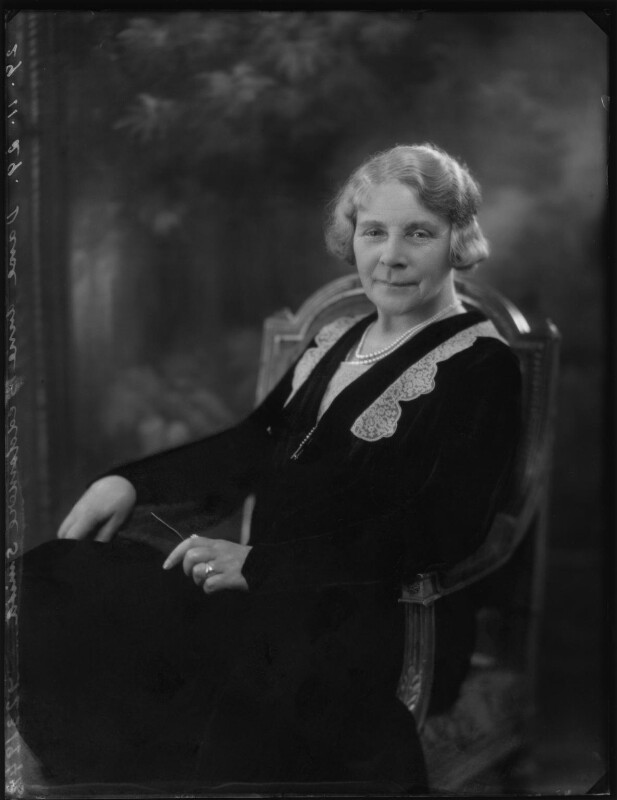
- Smith in 1929, National Portrait Gallery
- Born: 1869
- Died: 12 July 1960 (aged 90–91)
- Military career
- Allegiance: United Kingdom
- Branch: British Army
- Rank: Matron-in-Chief
- Commands: Territorial Army Nursing Service (1925–31); Queen Alexandra's Imperial Military Nursing Service (1917–24)
- Conflicts: Second Boer War; First World War
- Awards: Dame Commander of the Order of the British Empire; Royal Red Cross & Bar; Knight of the Legion of Honour (France)

Dame Anne Beadsmore Smith, DBE, RRC & Bar (1869 – 12 July 1960), also known as Ann or Annie, was a British nurse and British Army officer. She was a military nurse during the Second Boer War and the First World War. She then served as Matron-in-Chief of the Queen Alexandra's Imperial Military Nursing Service from 1917 to 1924 and Matron-in-Chief of the Territorial Army Nursing Service from 1925 to 1931.

She trained at St Bartholomew's Hospital, qualifying in 1894 and became a member of the College of Nursing in 1919.

== Honours ==
In the 1918 New Year Honours, Smith was awarded a Bar to her Royal Red Cross "in recognition of [her] very valuable services during the war". She was also made a Chevalier of the Légion d'Honneur by France for her war service, and she was granted permission to wear the award in 1920.

In the 1925 King's Birthday Honours, she was made Dame Commander of the Order of the British Empire (DBE) in recognition of her work as Matron-in-Chief of Queen Alexandra's Imperial Military Nursing Service, and thereby granted the title of dame.
