= Rosabelle Osborne =

British military nurse and nursing administrator

- Died: 8 May 1958
- Military career
- Allegiance: United Kingdom
- Branch: British Army
- Service years: 1903–1930
- Rank: Matron-in-Chief
- Commands: Queen Alexandra's Imperial Military Nursing Service (1928–1930)
- Conflicts: First World War
- Awards: Commander of the Order of the British Empire; Royal Red Cross; Mentioned in Despatches

Rosabelle Osborne, CBE, RRC (died 8 May 1958) was a British military nurse and nursing administrator. She served as Principal Matron at the War Office in 1924 and as Matron-in-Chief at the Queen Alexandra's Imperial Military Nursing Service (QAIMNS) from 1 April 1928 until 1930.

The second daughter of Dr. J. A. Osborne of Milford, County Donegal, Rosabelle Osborne received her training at the Manchester Children's Hospital, Pendlebury, and Bristol Royal Infirmary. She served with the QAIMNS from May 1903. She was on active service abroad during the First World War in France, Egypt, Malta and Salonika.
