= Elizabeth Oram =

British nursing matron

Acting Matron-in-Chief Dame Elizabeth Oram DBE RRC
- Born: 26 December 1860; Cirencester, England
- Died: 26 June 1946 (aged 85) South Kensington, England
- Allegiance: United Kingdom
- Branch: British Army
- Rank: Acting Matron-in-Chief
- Commands: Mediterranean Section, Queen Alexandra's Imperial Military Nursing Service
- Conflicts: Mahdist War; Second Boer War; First World War
- Awards: Dame Commander of the Order of the British Empire; Royal Red Cross

Dame Sarah Elizabeth Oram (26 December 1860 – 26 June 1946) Royal Red Cross and Bar, was a senior member of the Army Nursing Service and the Queen Alexandra's Imperial Military Nursing Service (QAIMNS). She served as Principal Matron, Nursing Inspector in the QAIMNS, and was attached to the British Expeditionary Force in France from 1914 to 1915 and subsequently as Acting Matron-in-Chief, QAIMNS, in the Eastern Mediterranean Expeditionary Force from 1915 to 1919 during the First World War.

== Background and training ==
Oram was born on Boxing Day, 1860 in Cirencester, the only daughter of Samuel Thomas Oram, a Surveyor of Taxes, and his wife, Sarah Oram, née Gibbons.

Oram's father died in Thirsk, Yorkshire in 1868, and Oram was educated at a private school in London and at the Malvern Link. Oram worked as a school teacher before commencing her nurse training at The London Hospital in February 1884. Oram trained under matron Eva Charlotte Ellis Luckes, between 1884 and completed her training on 22 February 1886.

== Career ==
Oram joined the Army Nursing Service (ANS) as an Army Nursing Sister on 1 May 1886 and served in Egypt for 5 years from 1891. On 11 December 1896, the London Gazette announced that she was awarded the Royal Red Cross for her role in caring for the sick and wounded soldiers who served in the Anglo-Sudan war, and the award was conferred by Queen Victoria at Windsor Castle on 5 March 1897. After 13 years as an Army Nursing Sister, she was promoted to the position of Superintendent in May 1899 and served in the Second Boer War in South Africa from January 1900 until 1902. Oram was made a matron in the newly formed QAIMNS in 1903. She was promoted to Principal Matron, QAIMNS, South Africa, 1911–1914; Principal Matron, Nursing Inspector QAIMNS, 1911–1914, and attached to the British Expeditionary Force, France, 1914–1915, before her final appointment as Acting Matron-in-Chief in 1915 of the Mediterranean Expeditionary Force. During her command in EWgypt she was in charge of another London Hospital trained nurse, Mary Pinsent.

Oram was appointed a Dame Commander of the Order of the British Empire in 1919 and invested on 10 March 1920 at Buckingham Palace.

== Death ==
Dame Sarah Oram died, unmarried, on 26 June 1946 in South Kensington, London, aged 85. The funeral took place at St George's Church, Campden Hill, and Oram was cremated at Kensal Green Crematorium on 1 July 1946.

== Honours ==
- Royal Red Cross, for nursing services in Cairo, December 1896.
- Bar to the Royal Red Cross, January 1918.
- Dame Commander of the Order of the British Empire, 1919.
