= Maud McCarthy =

British/Australian nurse

Matron-in-Chief Dame Maud McCarthy GBE RRC* DStJ
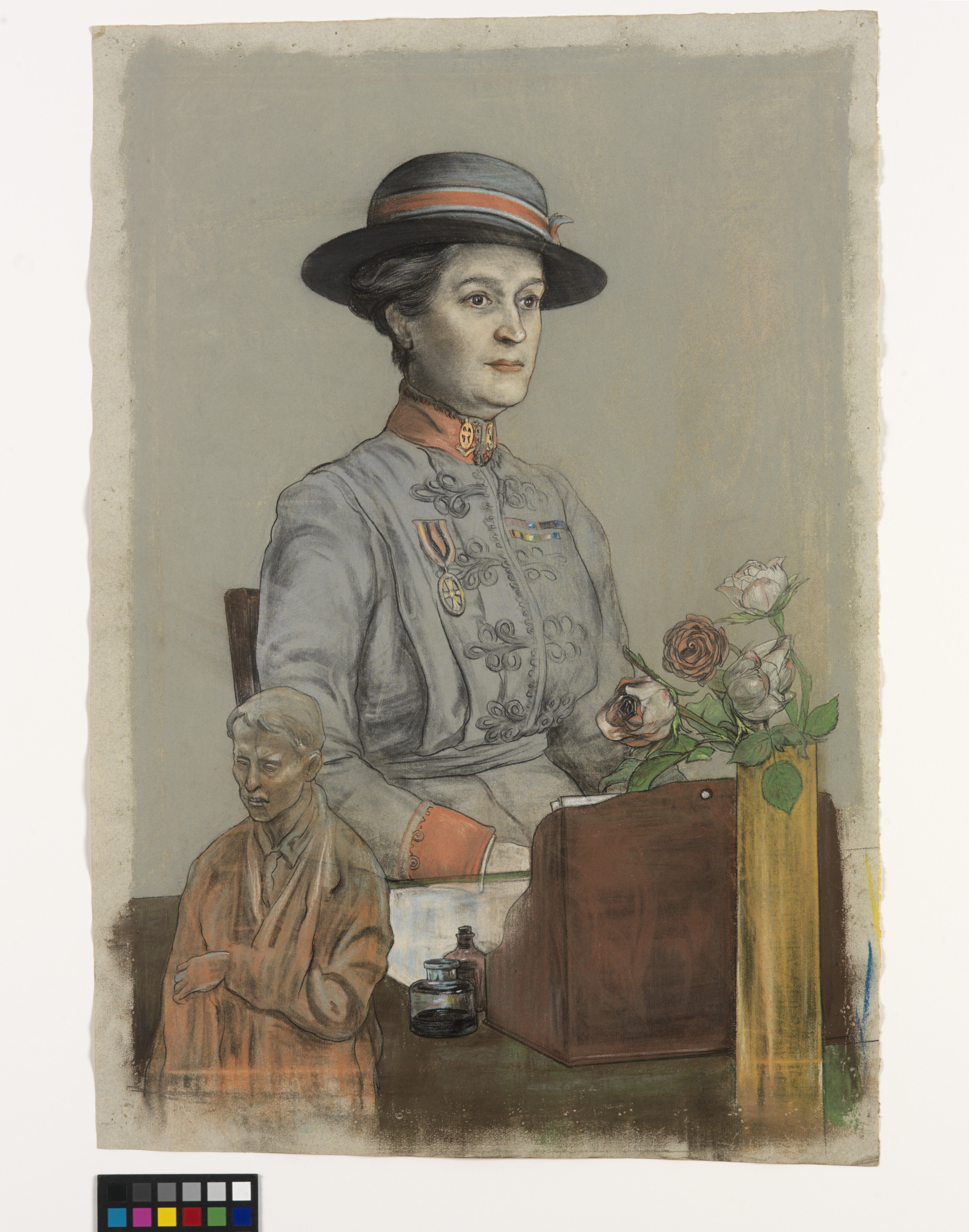
- Born: 22 September 1859; Sydney, Australia
- Died: 1 April 1949 (aged 89); Chelsea, London, England
- Military career
- Allegiance: United Kingdom
- Branch: British Army
- Service years: 1899–1925
- Rank: Matron-in-Chief
- Commands: Queen Alexandra's Imperial Military Nursing Service in France and Belgium
- Conflicts: Second Boer War; First World War
- Awards: Dame Grand Cross of the Order of the British Empire; Royal Red Cross & Bar; Dame of the Order of Saint John; Florence Nightingale Medal; Queen Elisabeth Medal (Belgium); Legion of Honour (France)

Dame Emma Maud McCarthy, GBE, RRC & Bar, DStJ (22 September 1859 – 1 April 1949) was a nursing sister and British Army matron-in-chief.

== Early life ==
McCarthy was born in Sydney, New South Wales, Australia, the eldest child of William Frederick McCarthy, a solicitor, and his Sydney-born wife, Emma Mary à Beckett. McCarthy was educated at Springfield College, Sydney, and passed with honours the University of Sydney's senior examination. After her father's death in 1881 she helped her mother to rear her brothers and sisters.

== Nursing career ==
By 1891, McCarthy was in England, and on 10 October 1891, entered The London Hospital, Whitechapel, to begin general nursing training as a probationer. She trained under Eva Luckes between 1891 and 1893. Hospital records state that "she had an exceptionally nice disposition" and was "most ladylike and interested in her work" although "she found it hard to control others, or to take firm action when necessary". She was nonetheless promoted to sister in January 1894.

McCarthy was Nursing Sister-in-Charge of the Sophia Women's Ward at the outbreak of the Second Boer War, and was one of the six sisters selected from The London Hospital by Princess Alexandra to go to South Africa as her own "military" nursing sisters. Resigning from the hospital on 25 December 1899, McCarthy served with distinction throughout 1899–1902 with the Army Nursing Service Reserve, receiving the Queen's and the King's Medal and the Royal Red Cross. Returning to England in July 1902, she was awarded a special decoration by Queen Alexandra. She then became involved in the formation of Queen Alexandra's Imperial Military Nursing Service, was promoted to matron within the service in February 1903 and during the next seven years was successively matron of the Cambridge Military Hospital at Aldershot, Netley Hospital and the Queen Alexandra Military Hospital in Millbank. In 1910 she was appointed principal matron at the War Office, a position she held until the outbreak of the First World War.

McCarthy sailed in the first ship to leave England with members of the British Expeditionary Force (BEF), arriving in France on 12 August 1914. In 1915 she was installed at Abbeville as matron-in-chief of the BEF in France and Flanders, taking charge of the whole area from the Channel to the Mediterranean, wherever British and allied nurses worked; she was directly responsible to General Headquarters. In August 1914, the number of nurses under her command was 516; by the time of the Armistice they were over 6,000. She was responsible for the nursing of hundreds of thousands of casualties from 1914 to 1918.

Adelaide newspaper The Journal reported on 24 October 1914 that McCarthy had been Mentioned in Despatches.

McCarthy was the only head of a department in the BEF who remained in her original post throughout the war, although she was on medical leave due to appendicitis from March–August 1917. She was appointed Dame Grand Cross of the Order of the British Empire in 1918, received a Bar to her Royal Red Cross and was awarded the Florence Nightingale Medal, the Belgian Médaille de la Reine Élisabeth, and the French Légion d'honneur and Médaille des Épidémies. When she left France on 5 August 1919, representatives from the French government and the medical services saw her off. The meticulous records kept since her arrival in France were taken to England with her.

Describing the matron-in-chief during the war, one general said:'"She's perfectly splendid, she's wonderful ... she's a soldier! ... If she was made Quartermaster-General, she'd work it, she'd run the whole Army, and she'd never get flustered, never make a mistake. The woman's a genius." Mary Salmon, writing in The Sydney Morning Herald in 1914, referred to her as a "slight, delicately-organised woman" with "an absolutely wonderful gift for concentrated work, and a power of organisation that has made her invaluable in army hospital work". She was matron-in-chief of the Territorial Army Nursing Service from 1920 until her retirement in 1925.

McCarthy became a member of the Royal College of Nursing (RCN) in 1920. She went on to be elected to the RCN Council 1925-1929, and became Vice President of the Royal College of Nursing from 1947 until her death in 1949.

== Personal life ==
McCarthy never married, and died at her home at Chelsea, London on 1 April 1949, aged 89. A pastel portrait of her by Austin Spare hangs in the Imperial War Museum. In 2014 she was honoured by having a blue plaque placed on her Chelsea former home.
