= Royal London Hospital =

Teaching hospital in Whitechapel, London

- Barts Health NHS Trust
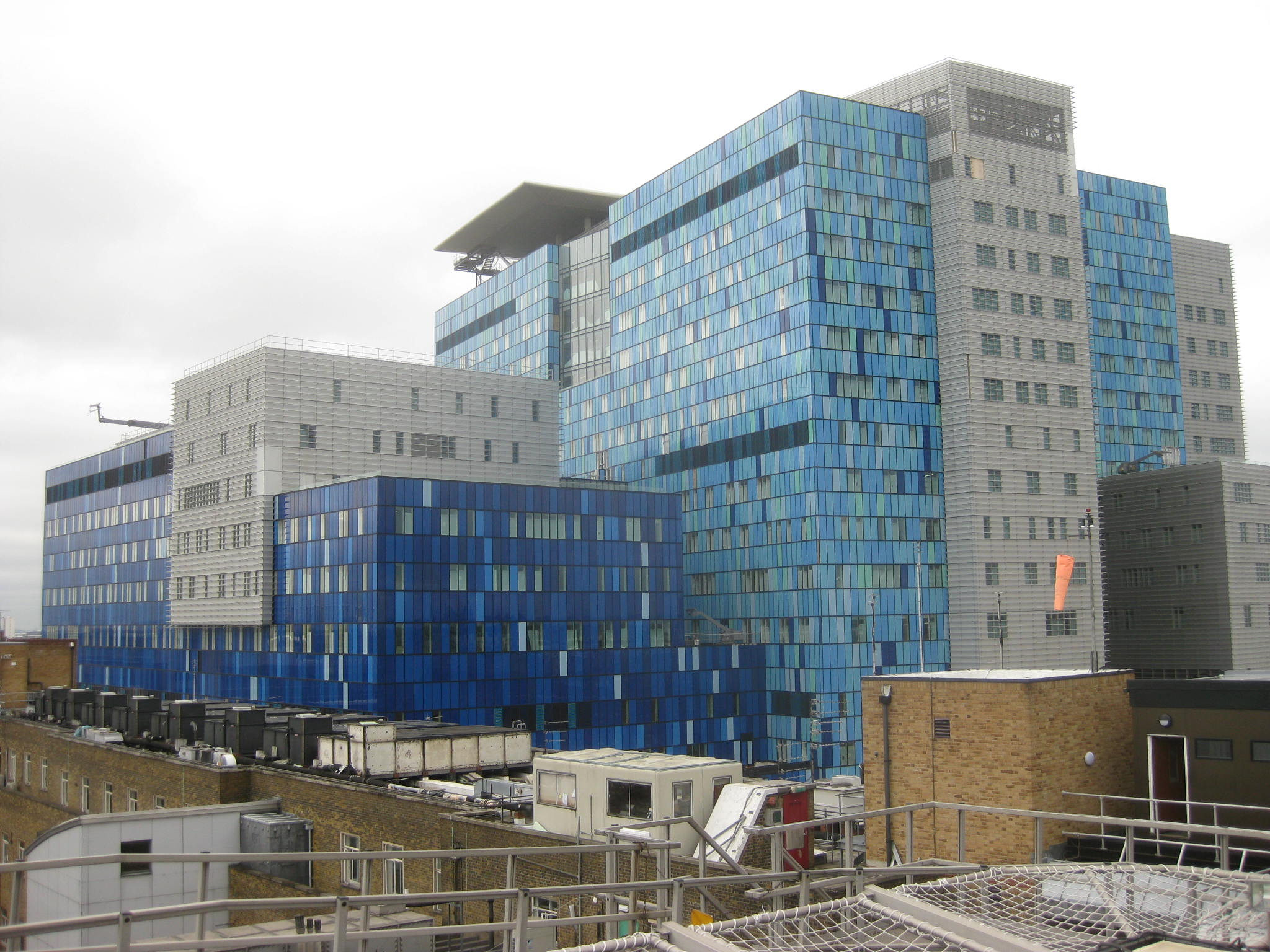
- The current Royal London Hospital under construction in 2009

- Location within Tower Hamlets

Geography
- Location: Whitechapel Road, Whitechapel, London, England
- Coordinates: 51.5180°N 0.0588°W

Organisation
- Care system: National Health Service
- Type: Teaching
- Affiliated university: Barts and The London School of Medicine and Dentistry

Services
- Emergency department: Major trauma centre (adults and children)
- Beds: 1,248

Helipads
- Helipad: Yes

History
- Founded: 1740; 286 years ago

Links
- Website: www.bartshealth.nhs.uk/the-royal-london

The Royal London Hospital is a large teaching hospital in Whitechapel in the London Borough of Tower Hamlets. It is part of Barts Health NHS Trust. It provides district general hospital services for the City of London and Tower Hamlets and specialist tertiary care services for patients from across London and elsewhere. The current hospital building has 1248 beds and 34 wards. It opened in February 2012.

The hospital was founded in September 1740 and was originally named the London Infirmary. The name changed to the London Hospital in 1748, and in 1990 to the Royal London Hospital. The first patients were treated at a house in Featherstone Street, Moorfields. In May 1741, the hospital moved to Prescot Street, and remained there until 1757 when it moved to its current location on the south side of Whitechapel Road, Whitechapel, in the London Borough of Tower Hamlets.

The hospital's roof-top helipad is the London's Air Ambulance operating base.

== History ==
=== Origins ===
By the middle of the 18th century, there were five voluntary hospitals in London (St Bartholomew's, Guy's, St Thomas', Westminster and St George's) which provided free medical care to those who could not afford it. However, none was located to the east of the City, where it could have served the comparatively impoverished and rapidly growing population of Spitalfields and Whitechapel; this was the void that The London Hospital was to fill. The institution that was to become The Royal London Hospital was founded on 23 September 1740, when seven gentlemen met in the Feathers Tavern in Cheapside in the City of London to subscribe to the formation of an "intended new infirmary".

On 3 November, The London Infirmary opened in a house on Featherstone Street, Moorfields. The staff consisted of one surgeon, physician and apothecary; and was operated as a voluntary hospital, in which patients were not charged for treatment and their care was funded charitably from annual subscription fees.

In May 1741, the hospital moved to larger premises in Prescot Street, at that time in an exceedingly bad district. The following year, 2nd Duke of Richmond was persuaded by the hospital's surgeon, John Harrison, to become the first President of the new hospital. The name changed to The London Hospital around 1748. The houses at Prescot Street were in an unfit state for use by 1744. A subscription fund for a new building was opened, and the current site was acquired at Whitechapel Mount (then relatively sparsely built on); however, funds were acquired slowly and it was not until 1751 that work began on the new building. The purpose-built hospital, which was designed by Boulton Mainwaring and accommodated 300 beds was opened to staff and patients in September 1757. The next year, the trustees of the charity acquired a royal charter so that they could constitute themselves as a legal entity.

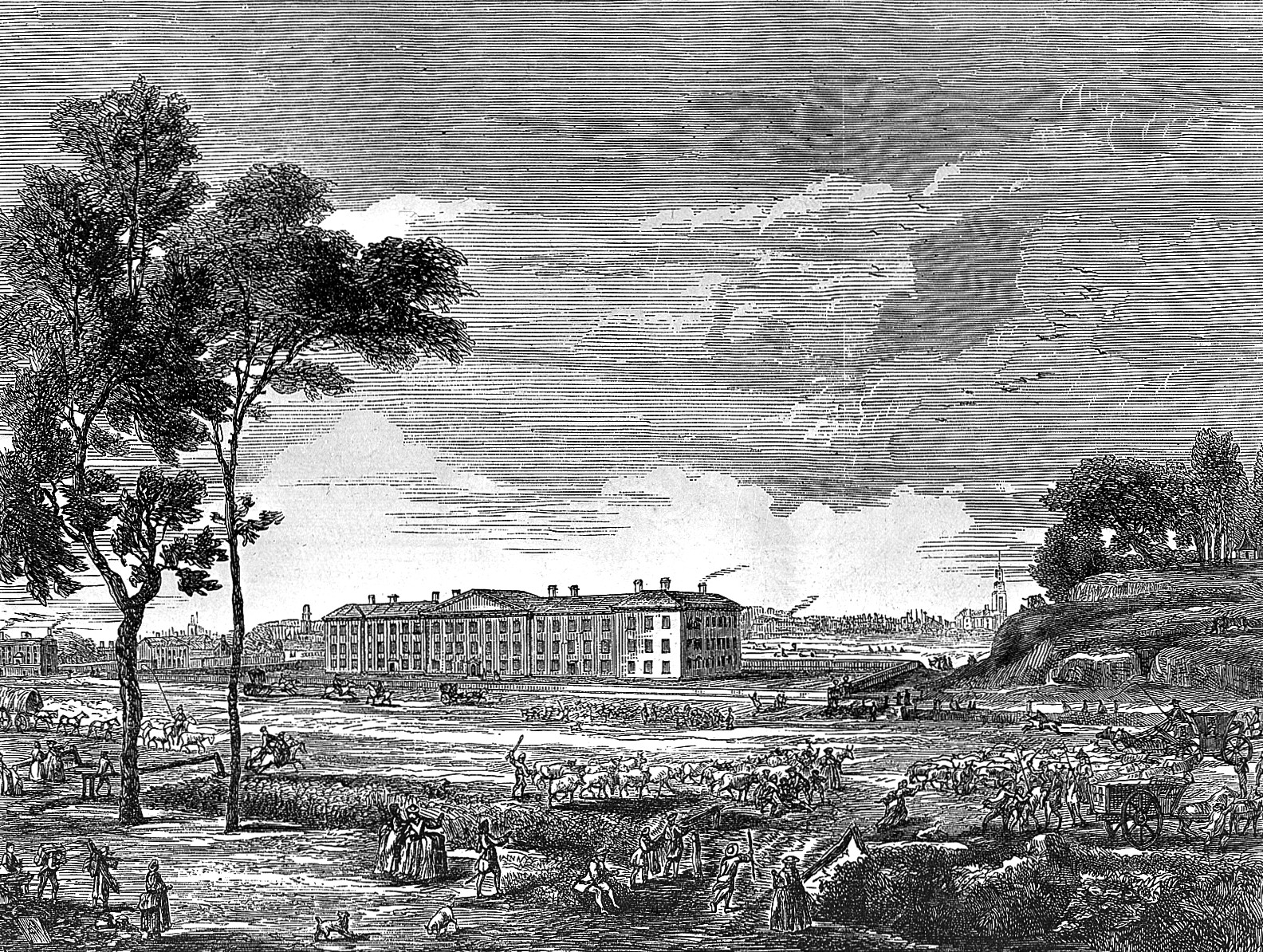
The London Hospital, Whitechapel in a 1753 engraving

Medical students had been recorded as studying under the staff of The London Hospital as private pupils since the year it had begun, however it was not until 1785 that the London Hospital Medical College was founded; chiefly through the efforts of William Blizard, the hospital's surgeon. Private medical schools had been long established, but the LHMC was the first purpose-built medical school in England and Wales organised in connection with a hospital. It amalgamated in 1995 with St Bartholomew's Hospital Medical College, under the aegis of Queen Mary and Westfield College to become St Bartholomew's and The Royal London School of Medicine and Dentistry.

=== 19th century ===
In the 1870s the medical staff determined to improve the quality of nursing care and in 1880 Eva Luckes was employed as Matron of the Hospital, a post which she held for nearly forty years. She was an influential nursing leader and instigated a new programme of nurse training, including the first Preliminary Training School for Nurses. She became known by her friend and mentor Florence Nightingale (also a Governor of The London Hospital) as 'O Matron of Matrons'. Luckes produced over 470 matrons during her tenure including Military Matrons in Chief Ethel Becher, Maud McCarthy and Sarah Oram, and several matrons of large provincial voluntary hospitals and Poor Law infirmaries including Annie Sophia Jane McIntosh, Matron of St Bartholomew's Hospital. In the late 1890s, Edith Cavell, who later helped some 200 Allied soldiers escape from German-occupied Belgium during the First World War, trained under Luckes and worked as a nurse at the hospital.

Joseph Merrick, known as the "Elephant Man", was admitted to the hospital in 1886 and spent the last few years of life there. His mounted skeleton is currently housed at the medical school, but is not on public display.

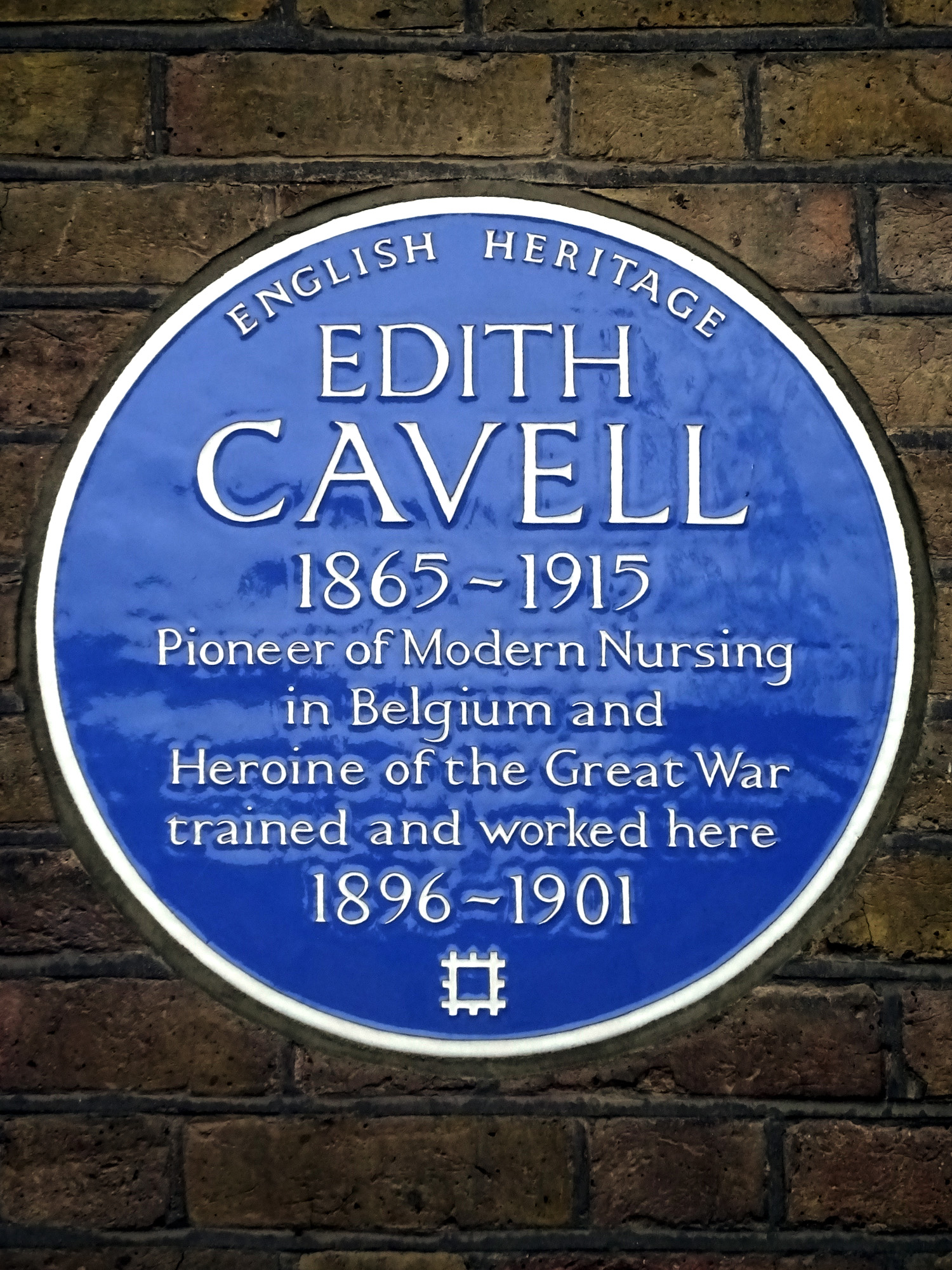
Plaque commemorating Edith Cavell's work at the hospital

=== 20th century ===
In the early 20th century the hospital sent out nurses to work unsupervised in private houses through their Private Nurses Institution, established in 1886. This earned £4,000 a year, a profit of £1,700.

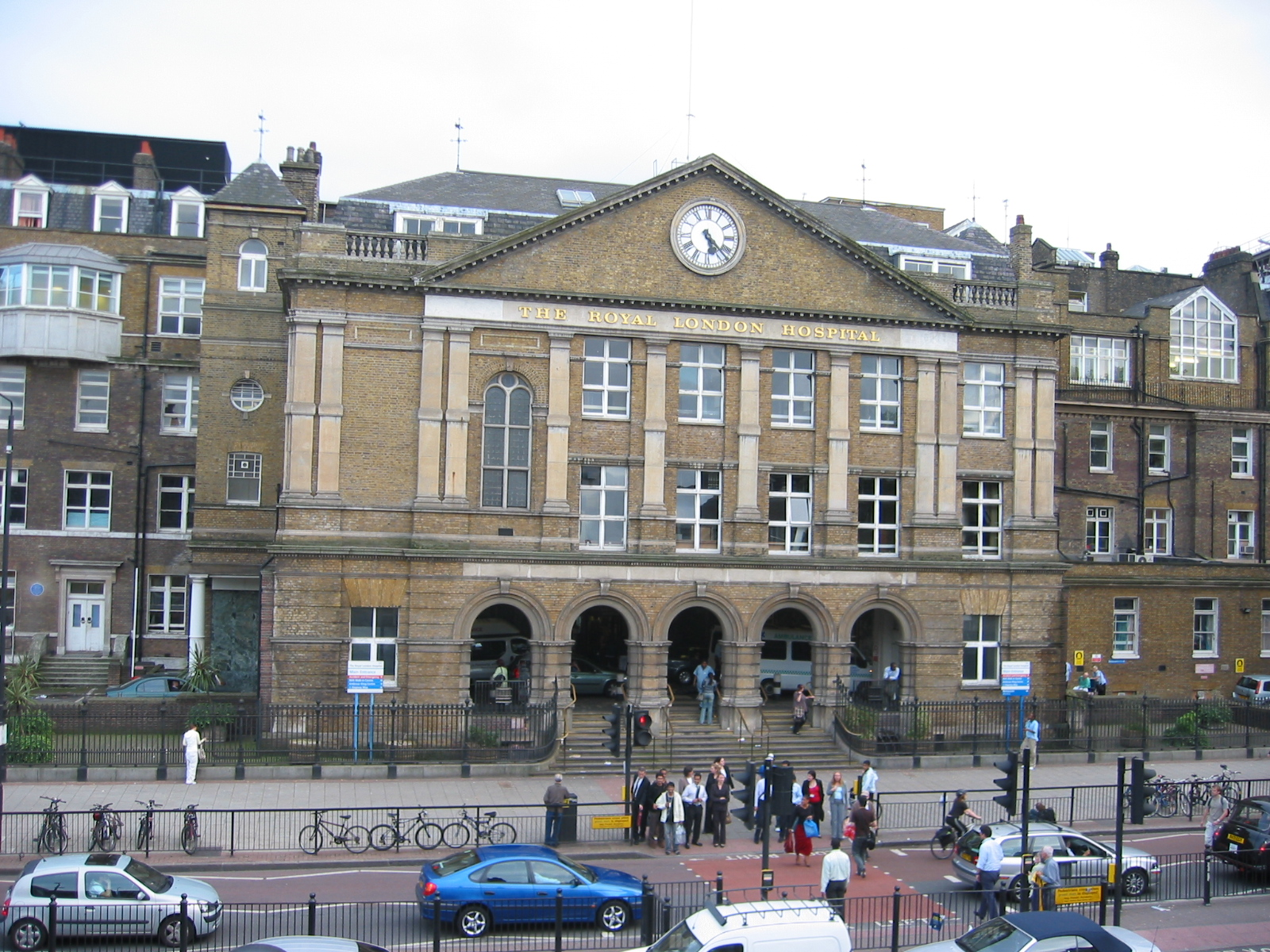
Facade of the old Royal London Hospital building

The chair of the hospital from 1931 to 1943 was a banker, William Henry Goschen. He led the funding of the hospital for over ten years and died there.

In 1990 Queen Elizabeth II visited the hospital and added "Royal" to the name, to celebrate the 250th anniversary of its founding. The present School of Nursing and Midwifery was formed in 1994 by the merger of the schools from St Bartholomew's Hospital and The Royal London Hospital to become the St Bartholomew School of Nursing & Midwifery. Prior to this, the school of nursing was known as the Princess Alexandra College of Nursing and Midwifery. In 1995 the new Nursing School was incorporated into City University, London.

=== 21st century: the new hospital ===
In March 2005 planning permission was granted for the redevelopment and expansion of The Royal London Hospital. The scheme was procured under a Private Finance Initiative contract in 2006. Sited on the grounds of the existing hospital, the works involved the replacement of certain of the hospital's old facilities, some of which dated back to when the hospital moved to its existing site in 1757. The works also involved the creation of a new trauma and emergency care centre and substantial new renal and paediatric facilities. These works, which were designed by HOK and undertaken by Skanska at a cost of £650 million, opened in part in 2012 and were completed in 2016. The old hospital buildings were converted into the new Tower Hamlets Town Hall for Tower Hamlets Council between 2019 and 2023.

In March 2020 it was reported that the 14th and 15th floors of the hospital, which were never fitted out because the trust had been unable to afford to do so, would be opened in order to provide more capacity to deal with patients during the COVID-19 pandemic. These floors were opened in May 2020 at a cost of £24 million.

== Notable staff and alumnae ==
- Dame Doris Beale, Matron-in-Chief of Queen Alexandra's Royal Naval Nursing Service (1941–1944)
- Ethel Hope Becher (1867–1948), Matron-in Chief of Queen Alexandra's Imperial Nursing Service from 1910 to 1919
- Edith Cavell (1865–1915), British nurse executed during the First World War
- Rosabella Paulina Fynes Clinton (1853–1918), nurse, founder of precursor of Society of Physiotherapists, and on council of Royal College of Midwives
- Edith Greaves (1880–1967), Matron of City of London Maternity Hospital from 1912 to 1944; midwifery leader
- Georgina Phoebe Herbert Haines (1867–1959), British nurse and military matron who cared for King Edward VII during and after his emergency appendicectomy carried out by Sir Frederick Treves, 1st Baronet
- Henrietta Hannath (1864–1939), British nursing leader and military nurse
- Laura Holroyde (1881–1958), British nursing leader
- Kate Evelyn Luard (1872–1962), British nurse and author
- Eva Charlotte Ellis Luckes (1854–1919), matron at The London between 1880 and 1919; influential nurse reformer
- Emma Maud McCarthy (1859–1949) British Army Matron-in-Chief during the First World War
- Beatrice Mary Marsh Monk (1882–1962), matron, nursing leader and President of the Royal College of Nursing
- Dora Opoku (1948-2010) was head of midwifery education at the Royal London Hospital from 1984
- Sarah Elizabeth Oram (1860–1946) was a senior military nurse and acting Matron-in-Chief, Queen Alexandra's Imperial Military Nursing Service, during the First World War
- Rosalind Paget (1855–1948), nurse reformer and midwife
- Gertrude Mary Richards (1864–1944) was a British nurse and senior military nursing leader during the First World War.
- Violetta Thurstan (1879–1978), nurse, author and weaver.

== Former museum ==
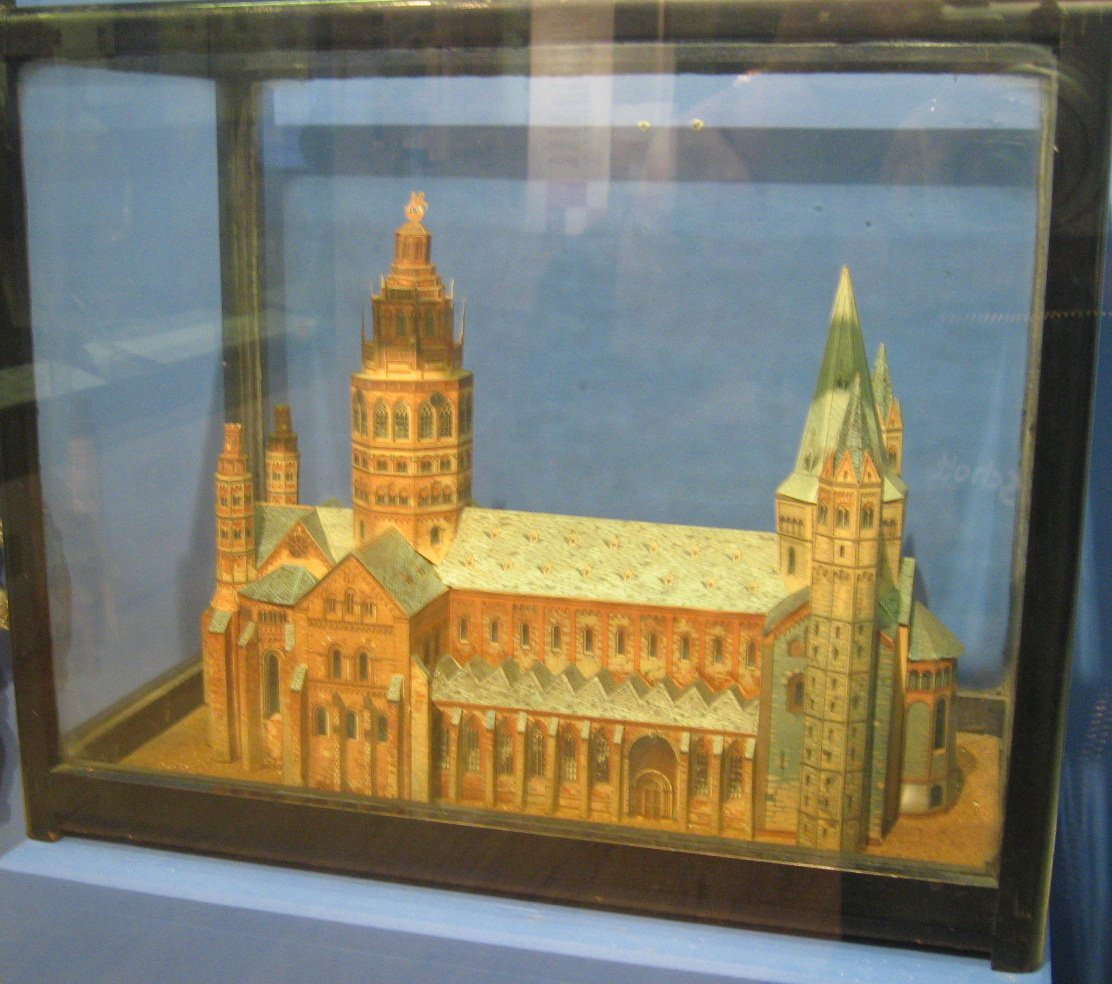
Card church built by Joseph Merrick, a replica of Mainz Cathedral displayed in the hospital's museum

The Royal London had a museum which was located in the crypt of a 19th-century church. It reopened in 2002 after extensive refurbishment. The museum covered the history of the hospital since its foundation in 1740 and the wider history of medicine in the East End. It was a member of the London Museums of Health & Medicine. It included works of art, surgical instruments, medical and nursing equipment, uniforms, medals, documents and books. There was a forensic medicine section which included original material on Jack the Ripper, Dr Crippen and the Christie murders. There were also displays on Joseph Merrick (the 'Elephant Man') and former Hospital nurse Edith Cavell. There was the model of a church in the hospital that was built by Joseph Merrick who spent the last few years of his life at the hospital. The museum closed in 2020.

== Emergency Department and Major Trauma Centre ==
The Royal London Hospital is the busiest trauma centre in the UK, with Barts and the London NHS Trust as a whole treating over 1,500 injury patients daily across its five hospitals.

The Queen Mary University of London Centre for Trauma Sciences, part of Barts and The London School of Medicine and Dentistry, has a strong clinical partnership with the hospital's Major Trauma Centre.

The Royal London Hospital is part of a citywide initiative to transform London's emergency and trauma services. In 2010, the London Trauma System was implemented. The network is believed to be the largest of its kind in the world. The System comprises four existing London hospitals, The Royal London Hospital (Whitechapel), King's College Hospital (Denmark Hill), St George's Hospital (Tooting) and St Mary's Hospital (Paddington), supported by a number of trauma units located in various A&E departments where patients with less serious injuries receive treatment.

== Air Ambulance ==
London's Air Ambulance is a charitable body funded by members of the public. Its helicopters are hangared at RAF Northolt, but their daytime base is on the 17th floor of the Royal London Hospital. At night doctors and paramedics travel in a Rapid Response Vehicle. The Air Ambulance treats 5 critically ill patients per day.

== In popular culture ==
The TV series Casualty 1900s is set at The Royal London, and follows the everyday life of the hospital throughout these years. Some of the storylines are based on actual cases drawn from the hospital records. Amazon Prime has acquired the series for broadcast in the US, where it is called London Hospital.

The TV comedy drama series Crashing (2016), which follows the lives of six property guardians living in a disused London hospital, was filmed at The Royal London.

The TV series Call the Midwife, which takes place during the 1950s and 1960s in East London, includes scenes at the then London Hospital. The series is a dramatization of the life of a nurse midwife who was trained at the hospital.

== Patient entertainment ==
Bedrock Radio (a registered charity established in 2002), which is based at Queens Hospital in Romford, provide a community health (hospital radio) service across East London, South Essex and immediate surrounding areas. Bedrock Radio began serving Barts Health Trust in November 2022 when Whipps Cross Hospital Radio (WXHR) closed down.

== Arms ==
Coat of arms of Royal London Hospital
Notes Granted 25 November 1927. The three ostrich feathers in the chief represent 'The Feathers' a tavern in Cheapside, London, where the founders of the hospital met in 1740 to discuss their proposals for a voluntary hospital. The red cross on a white background is symbolic for a medical institution, but coloured to emphasize the "L" for "London". Red and white are also the colours of London. Escutcheon Quarterly Argent and Gules a cross couped counterchanged on a chief azure three ostrich feathers of the first quilled Or. Motto Humani Nihil A Me Alienum Puto (I believe nothing human is alien to me)

== See also ==
- Healthcare in London
- List of hospitals in England
- London's Air Ambulance
- Whitechapel Mount

== Sources ==
- Grant, Sally (1995). Edith Cavell 1865–1915. Dereham: Larks Press. ISBN 978-0948400285.
