= Eva Luckes =

Matron of The London Hospital (1854–1919)

Eva Luckes CBE RRC DStJ
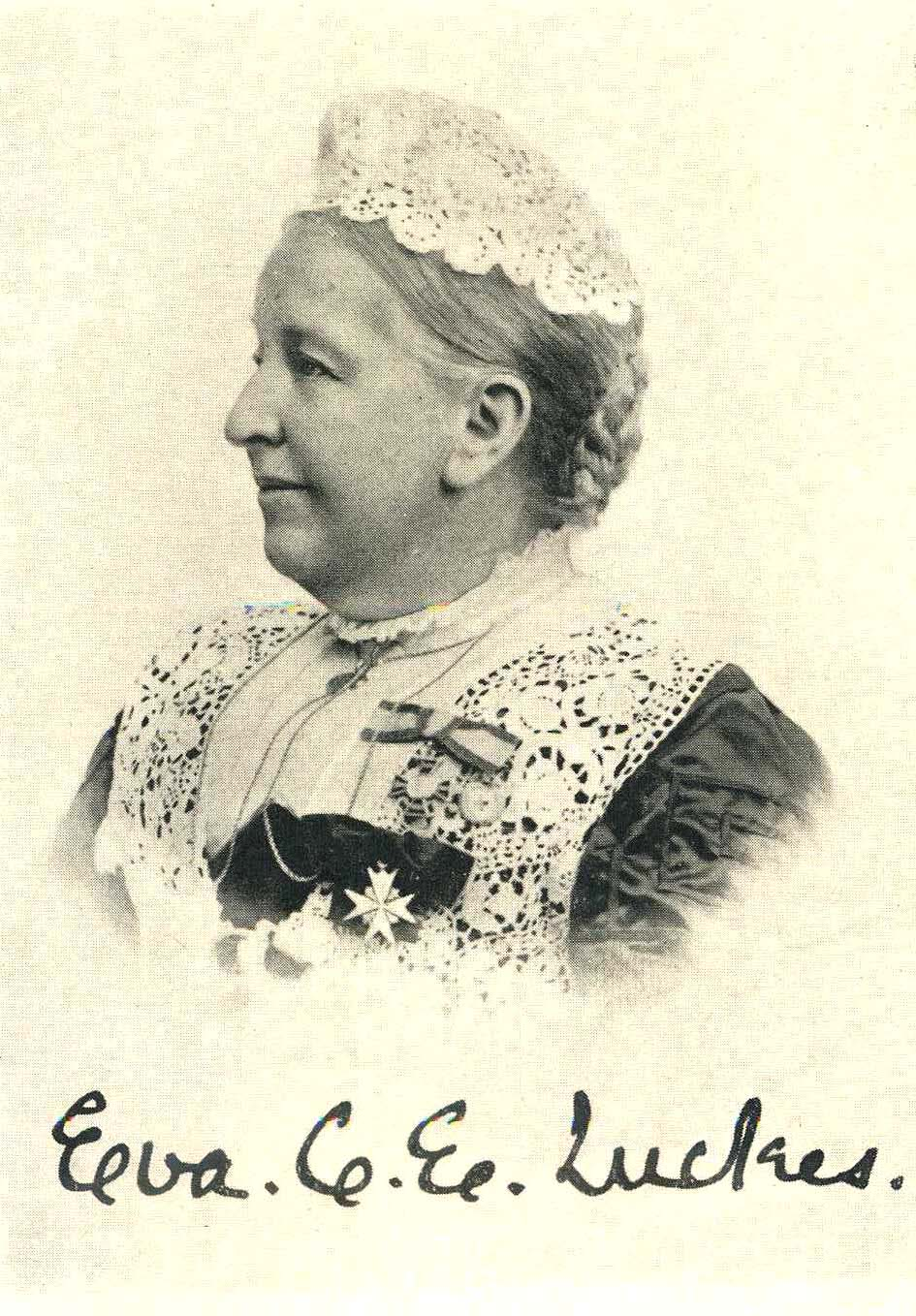
- Portrait of 1914
- Born: Eva Charlotte Ellis Luckes; 8 July 1854; Exeter, Devon, England
- Died: 16 February 1919 (aged 64); London, UK
- Occupations: Nurse, nursing leader and administrator

Eva Charlotte Ellis Luckes CBE RRC DStJ (8 July 1854 – 16 February 1919) was matron of the London Hospital from 1880 to 1919.

== Early life ==
Eva Charlotte Ellis Luckes (she spelled her name Lückes with the umlaut until World War I) was born in Exeter, Devon on 8 July 1854 into an upper middle-class family. Her father, Henry Richard Luckes, was a bank manager and entrepreneur who invested in local railways, and mines. They lived in Ross on Wye, and in Newnham, Gloucestershire. Miss Luckes, the eldest of three daughters, was educated at dame schools in Malvern, and at Cheltenham Ladies' College, and possibly in Dresden. She is said to have suffered from some physical disability and had a horse to help her travel about the countryside. After she finished her education she lived at home, helping her mother run the house and visited the sick of the parish. It was this that developed her interest in nursing.

== Early career ==
In September 1876 Luckes tried working at the Middlesex Hospital as a paying probationer for three months but she felt the work was too hard. She tried again at the Westminster Hospital, and she completing her training in August 1878. She was night sister at the London Hospital for a few months, before becoming lady superintendent / matron at the Manchester General Hospital for Sick Children in Pendlebury. She clashed with the medical committee for instigating reforms to the training of nurses and she resigned.

== The London Hospital ==
=== Application and appointment ===
After working for six months at the Hospital for Sick Children Great Ormond Street (Great Ormond Street Hospital), Luckes successfully applied for the position of matron at The London Hospital, where she had begun her professional career.

At 26, Luckes was the youngest of the five candidates interviewed and several of the Committee thought her "too young and too pretty" and were wary of appointing someone with relatively little experience. However, the confidence of the committee members was well founded as she set about introducing a programme of reforms to improve the standard of nursing at The London, although it should be remembered that a Sub-Committee, to review the system, had been appointed in the previous year.

While Luckes was not a "Nightingale nurse," in the sense of having trained at the Nightingale School at St Thomas', she sought advice on nursing and hospital problems from Nightingale. The two met periodically and Nightingale became her mentor, and active supporter when a House of Lords' committee was established to investigate charges against her. Nightingale worked strenuously behind the scenes to clear her name, notably by eliciting the help of her cousin, General Sir Lothian Nicholson, who was a governor at the hospital. Luckes was cleared of all the charges.

She was a valued collaborator of Nightingale's in the campaign against the state registration of nurses led by Ethel Gordon Fenwick, on which see "State Registration of Nurses" (McDonald).

Luckes is given credit for the appointment of Sydney Holland to the London Hospital committee, where he later became treasurer and chair. He raised the money for a substantial hospital expansion, including a new nurses' home. Luckes appreciated Nightingale's "patient, bright listening—there are as many differences in the ways of listening as in the ways of talking, are there not?" she remarked in a last letter: "I left your room yesterday feeling so much better for having been with you," her anxieties "melting away," so that she could be "strong" again, and "see clearly the way to go".

=== Reforms ===
Luckes' reforms initiated in 1880 were built around a well-established plan of what she wanted to achieve; before that date there were Probationers, but their training consisted simply of one year's work on the wards, after which they were considered to be trained nurses, without examination. They were then expected to undertake a further two years' service. She ensured that nurses were better provided for by seeing that meals were provided, and that better accommodation was available. After the reforms, it was established that a Probationer's training should last two years, the first year being concerned with theoretical knowledge and the second with practical skills.

If successful in the examination at the end of this time, the qualified nurse was expected to serve for a further year. The training was later extended to three years and one year after qualification. In 1884 a class of "Paying Probationers" – those who could afford to pay for their training – was introduced.

=== Training ===
The selection procedure for new nurses became more rigorous. After an application form had been filled in, there was a personal interview with Matron, a medical examination and a month's trial before being accepted as a probationer. Proper training was given, supplemented by lectures given by Luckes herself and two members of the medical staff. For the first few years these were given by Dr Sansom, a physician and Mr Treves, a surgeon. Proper examinations were introduced at the end of the training period. In 1895 the system of training was amended, by the introduction of a seven-week Preliminary Training Course at Tredegar House, devoted almost entirely to classroom learning, followed by an examination. In the summer of 1897, a typhoid epidemic broke out in Maidstone and nine of Luckes' Probationers were seconded to help, including Edith Cavell. Lückes also sent several more from the hospital's Private Nursing Institution. Of the 1,700 who contracted the disease, at least 132 died. In 1905 a department for the training of Pupil Midwives was established and was recognised by the Central Midwives Board in February 1906. She also improved the pay of her nurses and encouraged them to join the National Pension Scheme for Nurses that had been established.

=== Private Nursing Institution ===
In June 1885, Luckes introduced a Private Nursing Institution, which was established in January 1886, to provide trained nurses for private patients. The purpose of the system was twofold: to boost the reputation and finances of the Hospital and to keep the services of nurses who might otherwise leave.

=== Preliminary Training School – Tredegar House ===
Luckes introduced the Preliminary Training School in 1895 at Tredegar House. The original school was established in Bow, East London, in a Georgian property donated by Lord Tredegar. New probationers could get a feel for the work before entering the wards. It was also a way for Matron to assess whether the prospective nurse was suitable or not. The Preliminary Training School was moved to a purpose-built building constructed in 1911–1912 by architect and hospital surveyor, Rowland Plumbe who himself donated £5,000 towards the cost of building work. The second building was also known as Tredegar House.

=== State registration ===
Despite being busy with her reforms at the London, Luckes was fighting proposed reforms to the nursing profession as a whole. Correspondence was written at a turbulent time for Luckes and her contemporary, Florence Nightingale, with whom Luckes corresponded at least from 1891 – 1898. The British Nurses Association (BNA), founded in 1887, was campaigning vigorously for a statutory register of trained nurses as a way to achieve professional status. Both Florence Nightingale and Eva Luckes were opposed to registration on the grounds that the essential qualities of a good nurse would be subordinated to theory and exams. The BNA applied in 1891 to the Board of Trade to become a public company, but failed after a campaign organised by the anti-registrationists. In 1892, the BNA successfully applied for a Royal Charter of Incorporation, although the Privy Council watered down the charter by not including the power to maintain a register. State registration of nurses was not achieved until 1919.

=== Critics ===
As well as campaigning against registration, Eva Luckes found herself under attack from those who criticised her method of management. Her critics complained of the long hours and heavy responsibilities she expected from probationers. The hours were demanding: 7 a.m. – 9 p.m., with half an hour for lunch and the pay was £10 a year. They disliked her two (rather than three) year training course and her opposition to nurse registration.

In 1890–91, she was called before a Select committee of the House of Lords, set up to investigate the efficiency of metropolitan hospitals. Many charges from other witnesses were made against her department. The Select Committee made its report in 1892 and found not only the charges to be unsubstantiated, but that the majority of the allegations were exaggerated. Her achievements were undeniable, however, and she trained nurses who taught others all over the world, including Edith Cavell.

Luckes was decorated a number of times during her career, including the medals of the RRC, the CBE and Lady of Grace of the Order of Saint John.

== The 'Matron Maker' ==
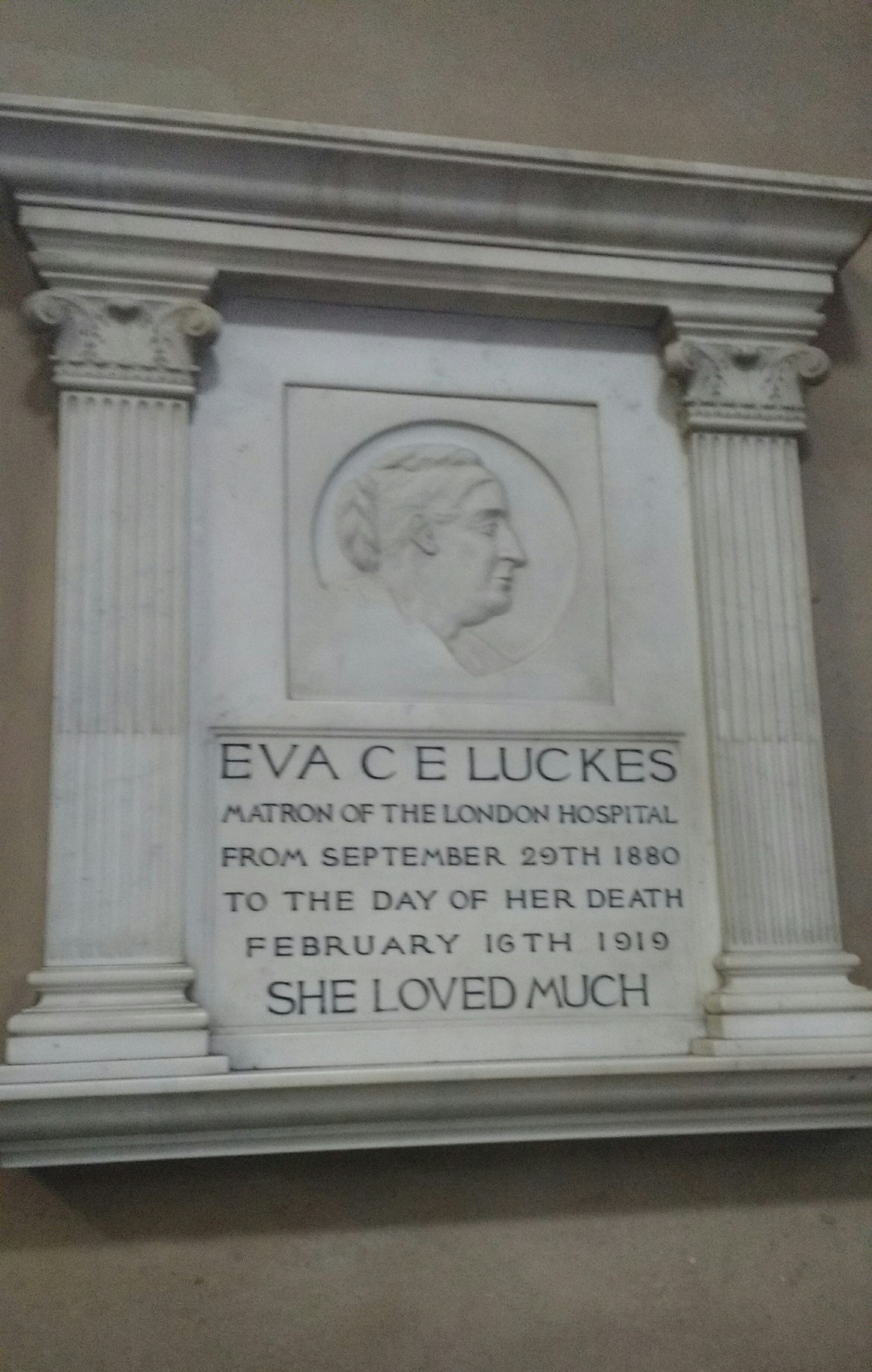
A plaque dedicated to Eva Luckes located in the Whitechapel library belonging to the Barts and The London School of Medicine and Dentistry.

Luckes was referred to by her friend and mentor Florence Nightingale as "Matron of Matrons", and on her death as a Matron Maker. She trained over 470 matrons during her tenure, including Annie McIntosh, a Matron of St Bartholomew's Hospital, Rosalind Paget, and three Military Matrons in Chief: Ethel Hope Becher, Emma Maud McCarthy and Sarah Oram, and Susan McGahey. She also trained Christina Graham Knight, OBE, Violetta Thurstan, and Gertrude Mary Richards. Several matrons at the Rous Memorial Hospital in Newmarket were trained by Luckes:

- Mary Winifred McDonall, Matron 1900 –
- Ann Maria Tubby, Matron 1906 – about 1910.
- Annie Langridge, Matron 1911 – until at least 1939.
- Dora Mildred Newman, Matron's Sick Relief and Holiday Duty, between about 1897 – 1911.

== Later life and death ==
As time progressed, Luckes' health deteriorated. She suffered from arthritis, diabetes and cataracts. During the final years of her life her mobility was impaired and she took to using a bath-chair. By 1919, she became acutely ill and was nursed by Sisters from the hospital. She died on 16 February 1919, aged 64, having been Matron of The London for 39 years. She was cremated and her ashes laid to rest behind a plaque on the north side of St Philip's Church, now the Medical School Library.

== Publications ==
Matron Luckes published her lectures in book form in 1884, General Nursing.

A second edition was published in 1898, "entirely rewritten and taken out of lecture form". In its preface she wrote eloquently of the importance of balance between character and technical knowledge in a good nurse. She ends, "There are many belonging to us of whom we can say with just pride, 'They help all with whom they come into contact – not because they can produce any number of Certificates, but because they love so much!'"

A Ninth Edition was published in 1914. In its Introduction she wrote: "... if a Nurse is to be worthy of her calling, her work must be inspired with the right spirit of Nursing, i.e. of active sympathy with suffering, manifested by unwearied kindness and unselfish devotion to the patients entrusted to her care". These words give us some idea of her approach to her life and work and why she opposed the campaign for a Registration Scheme. There is more in the same vein. Anyone who has interest or influence in the strategy of nurse training and discipline might find value in reading, and perhaps quoting, these introductions.

The book was widely used as a teaching aid and reference book by nurses.

She also produced a volume called Hospital Sisters and their Duties, which ran to four editions. Both books were a great success.

== Honours ==
Matron Luckes's achievements were recognised by: Commander of the Order of the British Empire, Royal Red Cross and Lady of Grace of the Order of Saint John.

== Portrayals ==
Matron Luckes is played by Cherie Lunghi in the BBC series Casualty 1906, Casualty 1907 and Casualty 1909.

Matron Luckes appears as a supporting character in the opera Joseph Merrick, the Elephant Man by Laurent Petitgirard.
