= National Council of Nurses of the United Kingdom =

Former representative body for British nurses

- RCN and NCN logo badge (1963–1973)
- Nickname: National Council of Nurses Great Britain and Northern Ireland (1946-1963)
- Predecessor: Provisional Committee of the National Council of Nurses of Great Britain and Ireland (1904)
- Merged into: Royal College of Nursing
- Formation: 1908
- Dissolved: 1963
- Headquarters: 431 Oxford Street, London
- Founding President: Ethel Gordon Fenwick
- Founding Chairman: Gertrude A Rogers

The National Council of Nurses Great Britain and Ireland (NCN) was created in 1908 as a national representative body at the International Council of Nurses (ICN). Prior to this it was known as the Provisional Committee of the National Council of Nurses of Great Britain and Ireland (NCN) (1904-1908). During the early years it was sometimes referred to as The National Council of Trained Nurses. In 1946 it changed its name to the National Council of Nurses Great Britain and Northern Ireland. It retained this name until it amalgamated with the Royal College of Nursing in 1963 becoming the Royal College of Nursing and National Council of Nurses of the United Kingdom with this being officially changed to Royal College of Nursing of the United Kingdom in 1973.

== History ==
=== Creation ===
On 1 July 1899, Ethel Gordon Fenwick proposed that an International Council of Nurses (ICN), a federation of national nursing associations, should be created. She made her proposal at the annual conference of the Matron’s Council of Britain and Ireland. To represent the United Kingdom internationally, a national council was needed. As founder of the Royal British Nurses' Association in 1887, Fenwick lobbied nursing organisations such as the hospital nurses' leagues and the Association of Hospital Matrons to form a national council from as early as 1899.

By 1904 Fenwick and Isla Stewart had managed to create the Provisional Committee of the National Council of Nurses of Great Britain and Ireland (NCN). This enabled the National Council of Nurses to affiliate to the ICN at its second international congress in Berlin. Although the concept was sound, Fenwick was a divisive figure and it was some years before enough nursing associations were persuaded to ally themselves with the National Council of Nurses to remove the word, provisional, from the title.

A meeting of the Provisional Committee on 31 January 1908, held in London, voted to agree to the creation and constitution of the National Council of Nurses of Great Britain. The three objectives were:

1. To promote mutual understanding and unity between Associations of Trained Nurses in the United Kingdom.
2. Through affiliation with the International Council of Nurses to acquire knowledge of nursing conditions in every country, to encourage a spirit of sympathy with the nurses of other nations, and to afford facilities for National hospitality.
3. To promote the usefulness and honour, the financial, and other interests of the Nursing Profession.

During this period, Fenwick sometimes referred to the organisation as 'The National Council of Trained Nurses.'

=== Relationship with the Royal College of Nursing ===
In 1916 nurse leaders, many disaffected by Fenwick, formed an alternative representative body: the College of Nursing. In 1923 the college directly lobbied the International Council of Nurses to accept it as a member, without it being affiliated to the UK's National Council of Nurses. This was not possible, so the college became affiliated with the National Council of Nurses, but tensions between the Royal British Nurses' Association and the College of Nursing continued to play out. The situation was not helped by the significant decline in Association membership against a significant rise in College membership; by 1925 the Association's membership numbered about a fifth of the membership total of the College of Nursing. The college further threatened the Association's status when it applied for its own royal charter in 1927. Its charter was granted in 1928, acquiring a new name in 1939: the Royal College of Nursing. In response, the Association continued to dominate decision-making in the National Council of Nurses throughout this period, in particular by restricting the college to eight delegates so that they could be outvoted easily.

=== Post-war issues ===
After the Second World War the National Council of Nurses sought to revise its constitution and increase its fees, but caused controversy by not consulting its membership adequately. Concerns were raised that individual nurses were represented by more than one association, duplicating effort and costs. It was also argued that many of the associations represented at the National Council of Nurses were hospital nurses' leagues; it was maintained that they were social rather than professional associations. The Royal College of Nursing continued to claim that it was underrepresented whilst the National Council of Nurses counter-claimed that it included associations of nurses that were not eligible for membership of the College of Nursing, including those on the fever, mental health, learning disability and men's nursing registers.

Revisions to the Constitution included a proposal from the Royal College of Nursing Belfast branch to rename the organisation to the National Council of Nurses Great Britain and Northern Ireland, which was successfully agreed in 1946.

Fenwick had financially subsidised the National Council of Nurses from its inception, and with her death in 1947 its financial difficulties increased.

=== Negotiations on NCN's future ===
In 1949 one of the Royal College of Nursing sub-committees voted to withdraw from membership of the National Council of Nurses and, although the college's main Council agreed to postpone action and instead pursue reconciliation, little progress was made. The dominance of the college in negotiations regarding the newly-formed National Health Service (where hospital nurses on the General Register of Nursing dominated) was at odds with its position in the National Council of Nursing. At the 1957 International Council of Nurses congress in Rome, the British group split its votes on nursing issues. At that point, Florence Udell and Mabel Lawson, both active in international health agencies, became actively involved in resolving the longstanding conflict. They led a joint meeting in 1958 which agreed the principal of a unified professional body under a royal charter.

The efforts of Udell and Lawson coincided with several significant developments. Firstly the Nurses Act 1949 discontinued a separate register for male nurses, placing them on the General Register of Nursing whilst the Nurses Act 1957 discontinued the specialist registers for mental health and learning disability nurses. Secondly, at the Royal College of Nursing the appointment of Catherine Hall in 1957 led the way in discussions within the college for these groups to be included in College membership, which resulted in extension of membership in 1960. The consequent changes in the wider nursing landscape, together with a strengthened Royal College of Nursing, meant unification became more desirable.

=== Merger ===
The National Council of Nurses of the United Kingdom and the Royal College of Nursing amalgamated in 1963 to create the National Council of Nurses and Royal College of Nursing of the United Kingdom, under a new supplementary Royal Charter. National Council of Nurses patron H.M. Queen Elizabeth The Queen Mother and the Royal College of Nursing patron HM The Queen Elizabeth II both became patrons of the new organisation. The National Council of Nurses and the Royal College became a representative national nursing organisation at the International Council of Nurses meetings, with voting powers on behalf of the UK nursing profession.

In reality the National Council of Nurses merged into the Royal College of Nursing. During the 1960s the press usually referred to the merged body as the Royal College of Nursing or RCN, with the title officially changed to the Royal College of Nursing of the United Kingdom in 1973. Miss M.J. Marriott was interim president of the new body between 1958 and 1960, handing over to Mabel Lawson after the annual general meeting at the end of June 1963, so that Lawson served until 1964. Florence Udell succeeded Lawson as president, serving from 1964 to 1966.

== Notable people ==
=== Presidents ===
- Ethel Gordon Fenwick (1904–1945)
- Dame Ellen Musson DBE RRC (1945–1946)
- Daisy Bridges CBE RRC (1946–1948)
- Katherine F Armstrong (1948–1951)
- Lucy Gwendoline Duff Grant OBE RRC (1951–1957) (Miss M.J. Marriott interim president of the new body 1958–1960);
- Mabel G Lawson OBE (1957–1962)
- Florence Udell (1964–1966)

Also notable are:

- Beatrice Cutler Secretary from its inception in 1908 until at least 1922
- Helen Dey a Member of their Executive Committee 1926-1934 and Vice President from December 1934;
- Mildred Hughes (nurse) Vice President from 1946;
- Beatrice Monk who was Honorary Treasurer.
