= The Hospital (journal) =

British medical journal, 1886–1924

The Hospital and Health Review
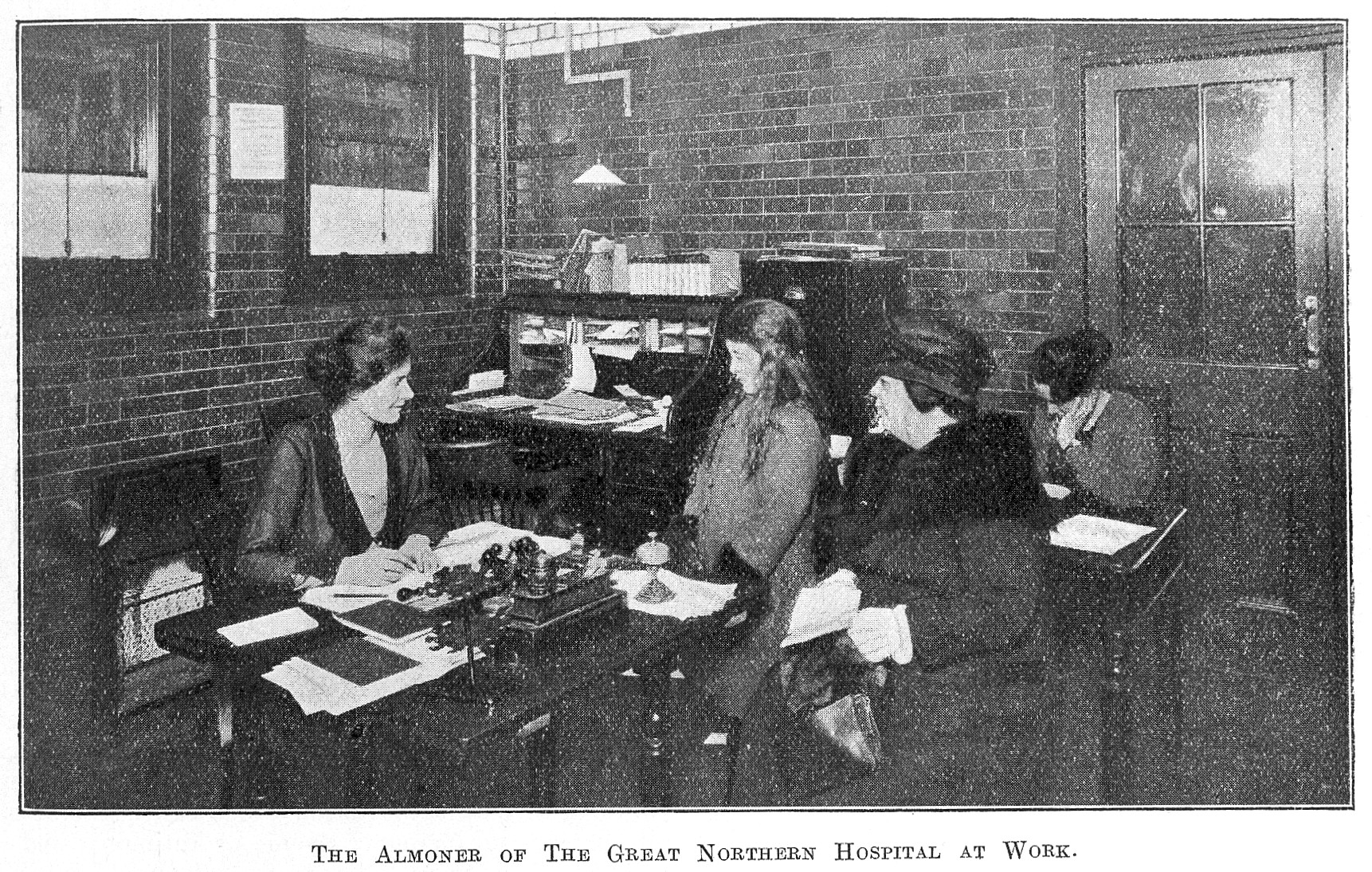
- Photograph of hospital almoner Joan Kennedy from an issue of The Hospital circa 1922.
- Discipline: Hospital medicine
- Language: English
- Edited by: Sir Henry Burdett, Solomon Charles Smith

Publication details
- Former name: The Hospital
- History: 2 October 1886; 139 years ago
- Publisher: W H & L Collingridge Ltd, City Press (UK)
- ISO 4: Find out here

Indexing
- ISSN: 0267-6478
- ISSN: 0268-3571

The Hospital was the journal of British Hospitals Association. It was published weekly from 1886 and featured articles on medical science, hospital administration and nursing. In 1921, it was succeeded by The Hospital and Health Review, which ran until 1924.

== History ==
The Hospital journal was founded by philanthropost and medical publisher Sir Henry Burdett as the journal for the British Hospitals Association, which he had founded two years before. The first issue was published on 2 October 1886 by the Scientific Press.

It was intended to be

An Institution, Family, and Congregational Journal of Hospitals, Asylums, and all Agencies for the Care of the Sick, Criticism and News.

The journal also later featured 'a special section for nurses'. It was edited by Burdett and surgeon Solomon Charles Smith, who was also on the editorial staff of the British Medical Journal.

The Hospital had an uneasy relationship with other British medical journals.The Nursing Record criticised it as 'a paper which [Burdett] makes desperate efforts to pretend is a "medical journal," and year after year, the more he pretends, the more do medical men laugh.' The Hospital published content arguing against the professionalisation of nursing, for which the Record and its owner, Ethel Bedford Fenwick, campaigned. The British Medical Journal refused to recognise The Hospital in its list of leading medical journals and the Lancet published editorials critical of The Hospital, claiming that the journal harmed doctors' authority and earnings by providing 'not medicines, indeed, but medical advice to the public, one and all, for one penny!' Burdett required support from the medical establishment for his hospital charity work and responded by changing the stated intended audience of The Hospital to 'Medical Practitioners, Students, Nurses, and the Charitable Public'.

In October 1921, The Hospital and Health Review replaced The Hospital. The first issue stated its intention to publish articles on public health and disease prevention in addition to subjects previously covered, and to give an overview of important information published in other medical publications. The journal ceased publication in 1924, a few years after Burdett's death.

The title The Hospital and Health Review was adopted in 1930 for a separate publication by the Institute of Hospital Administrators for its journal, which later became The Hospital and Health Services Review.
