= Beatrice Cutler =

British matron

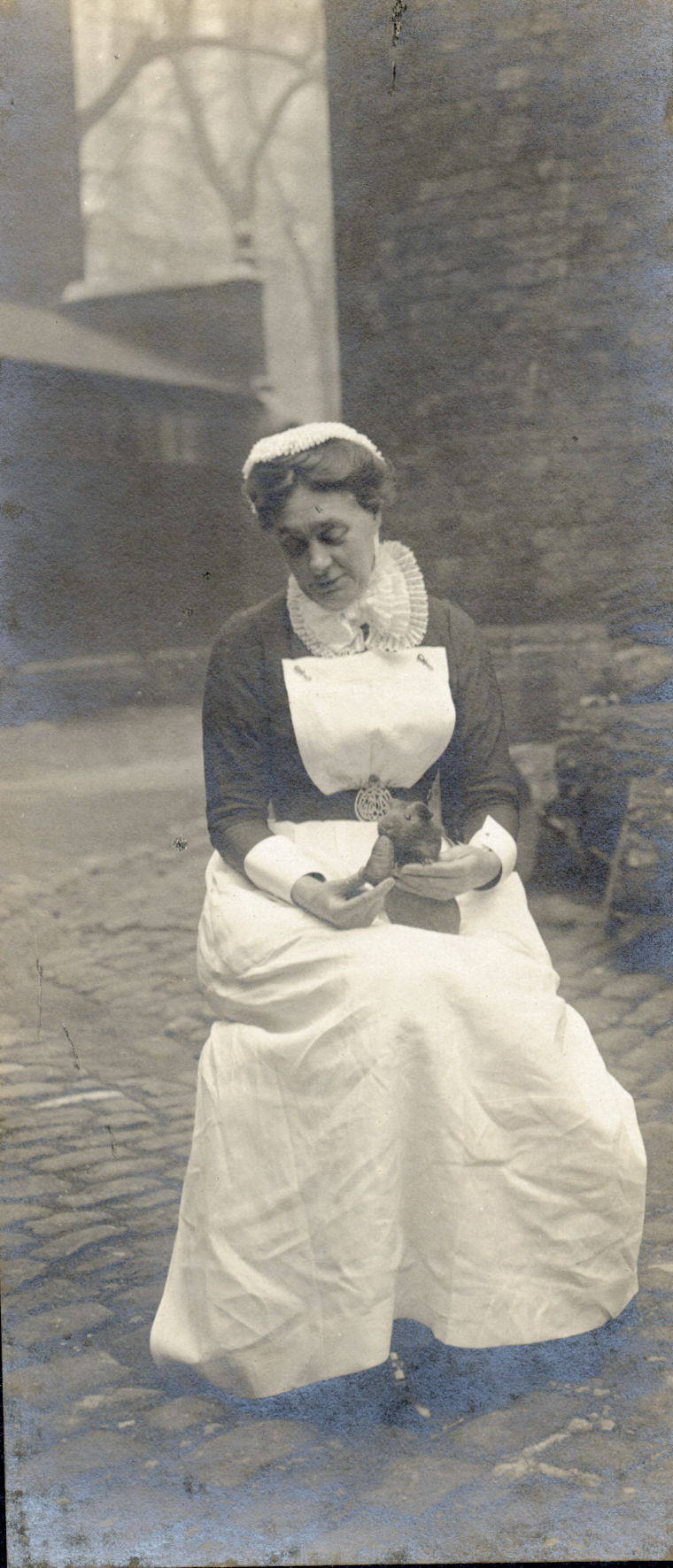
- Born: 1861
- Died: 1942 (aged 80–81)
- Occupation: Assistant Matron
- Employer: St Bartholomew's Hospital
- Organization: founding Secretary of the National Council of Nurses of the United Kingdom.

Beatrice Cutler (25 August 1861–4 August 1942) was a matron who campaigned for State Registration of Nurses in the UK and was founding Secretary of the National Council of Nurses of the United Kingdom.

== Training ==
Cutler was born 25 August 1861 in the Bloomsbury area of London. From 1885 to 1888 Cutler was a probationer nurse at St Bartholomew's Hospital, London where she successfully completed three years certified nurse training in 1888, becoming Staff Nurse there from May–November 1888. Cutler was trained by Ethel Gordon Fenwick the then Matron at St Bartholomew's, who was to be a great influence in her nursing career.

== Early career in Egypt ==
In December 1888 Cutler relocated to Egypt for what she considered "the great adventure of her life" as Sister at Kasr-el-Aini Hospital, Cairo, until 1892. Between 1892 and 1898 she was Superintendent, Medical School for Girls Kasr-el-Aini Hospital, Cairo. The hospital had been founded in 1827, but with Britain's invasion of Egypt in 1882, there was the opportunity for British staff such as Cutler to create change. Cutler led work introducing hospital nurse training for the local nurses. She was also in charge of the hospital's midwifery wards and the gynæcological section. This work came at some personal risk – with her predecessor, Hughes dying of typhoid in 1889.

Whilst in Egypt Cutler retained close ties to England. She registered on the 21 July 1893 as a member of the Royal British Nurses' Association which was lobbying for the state registration of trained nurses. Cutler returned to London for a brief time, between August–October 1890, as a pupil midwife, at the City of London Lying-in Hospital, gaining the certificate of the London Obstetrical Society (a recognised midwifery certificate) allowing her to use 'cert., L.O.S.' after her name. In 1895 she trained for her Massage Certificate.

In 1898 she became Inspector of Pilgrims in the Quarantine Camp, El-Tor, Suez, Egypt, a role that aimed to reduce infectious diseases, particularly plague. From 1898 to 1902 she was Matron of the English Hospital and Victoria Nursing Home, Cairo and in 1901 became a member of the Matrons' Council.

== Career in England ==
In 1902 Cutler returned to England, and was Matron, Much Wenlock Hospital Shropshire until 1904. Also in 1902 she increased her active involvement in Fenwick's nursing campaign and was increasingly mentioned in The Nursing Record. Cutler was elected as member number 11 of the Society for the State Registration of Nurses, and listed as one of the first hundred members of the Society. In 1904 she returned to London as Superintendent of the Nurses' Home, St Bartholomew's Hospital. In 1907 she was promoted to Assistant Matron at St Bartholomew's Hospital, a post she held until 1920. From 1910-1920 she was assistant matron to Annie McIntosh.

Throughout this time she remained an active campaigner, including becoming Secretary of the newly formed National Council of Nurses from 1908 until at least 1922. This role included a regular column in 'The Nursing Record' outlining Council meetings and activities, which she was frequently called upon to chair, and being actively involved in the International Nursing Congress which took place in London in 1909. The press reports her financial donations towards the campaign for state registration in the UK, and her role in a deputation to Parliament on that issue.

Whilst at St. Bartholomew's, Cutler worked alongside Matron Isla Stewart. Stewart co-authored Practical Nursing, with Dr Herbert Guff, first published in 1899 it had multiple editions. Upon Stewart's death in 1910 Cuff worked with Cutler to update the 1911 edition.

== First World War ==
Shortly after World War I was declared on 4 August 1914, Cutler set out on the 19th August 1914 leading a party of 15 nurses to Belgium for the Belgian Red Cross, 'Arriving as they did in Brussels the day before the occupation of the city by the Germans they were under arrest during the whole of their stay there. They worked in the Hospital of St- Pierre, nursing—with French, Belgian, and Swiss colleagues'. Upon her return she focused on her duties at Barts, although during the war she visited Barts nurses based in Europe such as visit to Bolougne.

The campaign for nurse registration continued throughout the war, and Cutler continued in her work on the executive of the National Council of Nurses. Her wartime experiences informed her campaigning, strengthening her arguments in favour of nurse registration. This can be seen in her keynote paper on 'Military Nursing and Registration' at the Society for the State Registration of Nurses conference in the summer of 1915 which was written up in full in The Nursing Record. She argued that the lack of a register thwarted the effective mobilisation of specialist nurses as part of the war effort.

== Later life and retirement ==
Cutler was Honorary Secretary and a founder member of League of St Bartholomew's Hospital Nurses 1914–1920 and at the time of her death was vice-president of the League of St. Bartholomew's Hospital Nurses. She was also involved in the Trained Women Nurses' Friendly Society. In 1919 she was elected to the Council of the Royal British Nurses' Association.

After her retirement from St Bartholomew's in 1920, Cutler continued to take a keen and active interest in her profession. During 1921 Cutler was 'Home Sister' for the new Nurses' Club that opened at the new headquarters of the Royal British Nurses' Association at 194 Queen's Gate in London.

On 30 September 1921 Cutler successfully registered with the General Nursing Council – becoming number 17 on the register, giving her address as Limpsfield Surrey. This was during the contentious introduction of registration when Ethel Gordon Fenwick insisted on personally reviewing all the applications – Cutler's early inclusion on the register was probably due to her longstanding relationship as Fenwick's student and active supporter. Cutler maintained her registration, being listed at the same address twenty years later in 1940, by which point newly registered nurses were allocated numbers in the 100,000s. Cutler remained actively involved in Fenwick's Royal British Nurses' Association, of which she was Hon. Secretary at the time of her death in 1942.

Life was not all campaigning; at Wenlock Cutler had a collie dog called Ben who formed part of a profile piece in 1908 and her retirement was marked with a portrait of her with her guineapig at St Bartholomew's Hospital. She enjoyed travel and in January 1922 she announced an extended trip to South Africa returning in time to represent the Council of Nurses at the International Council of Nurses Congress in Copenhagen. She was travelling in South Africa upon the outbreak of the Second World War, at which point she returned to UK and joined a splint making party at St Bartholomew's outpatients each week until her death in 1942.

On 4 August 1942 Cutler died after a short illness at St Bartholomew's Hospital. A service took place in the Church of St. Bartholomew-the-Less for friends and colleagues, with a final service at Golders Green Crematorium.

== Awards and honours ==
For her service in the First World War, she was awarded the British War Medal 1914–1918 and the Victory Medal (UK). She was also awarded the Mons Star and the Marie Jose Medal by the Belgian Red Cross.

Along with Isla Stewart Cutler was awarded French Medaille d'Argent de l'Assistance Publique; their award was for the supervision of French nursing students from the Assistance Publique de Paris on a training secondment.

In 1943 a bed at St Bartholomew's Hospital was endowed in her memory.
