= Nurses Salaries Committee =

- Nickname: Rushcliffe Committee
- Formation: 1941
- Dissolved: 1943

The Nurses Salaries Committee was the first official body to fix salary scales and conditions for nursing in England. It was founded in 1941, and ceased its activity with its last report in 1943. Henry Betterton, 1st Baron Rushcliffe or Rushcliffe, as he was later known, was appointed by Ernest Brown the minister of health to chair the committee, which was established in October 1941.

== Membership ==
The committee consisted of two panels, each of twenty members, one panel representing employers, the other employees.

The employers panel consisted of the:

- British Hospitals Association (in association with King Edward's Hospital Fund for London and the Nuffield Trust) 6 seats Bernard Docker, Muriel M Edwards, S Clayton Fryers (Leeds General Infirmary), Gilbert G Panter, J P Wetenhall, S P Richardson (who was replaced by L Farrer Brown);
- County Councils Association 4 seats W A Bullough, W B Cartwright, Wynne Cemlyn-Jones, T O Steventon;
- Association of Municipal Corporations 4 seats Cyril Banks, J Lythgoe, GW Martin, EC Parr;
- London County Council 3 seats John William Bowen, W Allen Daley, Somerville Hastings;
- Urban District Councils Association 1 seat Luther Bouch;
- Rural District Councils Association 1 seat E A Cross;
- Queen's Institute of District Nursing 1 seat Elena Richmond.

The employees panel consisted of the:

- Royal College of Nursing 9 seats Irene H Charley, I B Clunas, Frances Goodall, Gladys Hillyers, Mildred Hughes, E O Jackson, Florence Taylor, Marianne Wenden, Mercy Wilmshurst;
- Trades Union Congress 5 seats Dorothy M Elliott, George Gibson (trade unionist), Hilda M Gray, Arthur Moyle, Baron Moyle, Doris E Westmacott;
- National Association of Local Government Officers (NALGO) 3 seats - H Allen, A G Bolton, C A W Roberts;
- Royal British Nurses' Association 1 seat Isabel MacDonald (later D G. Tilby);
- British College of Nurses 1 seat;
- Association of Hospital Matrons 1 seat Helen Dey.
- A parallel committee was set up in Scotland, alongside the creation of a Nursing Division in the Ministry of Health, UK in 1941.

== Outputs ==
The committee published two reports in 1943.

- The First Report Of Nurses Salaries Committee Salaries And Emoluments Of Female Nurses In Hospitals was published by HMSO in 1943.
- Second Report of Nurses Salaries Committee Salaries and Emoluments of Male Nurses, Public Health Nurses, District Nurses And State Registered Nurses In Nurseries was published by HMSO in December 1943.
