= Susan Villiers (nurse) =

English nurse

Susan Villiers (1863–1945) was an English nurse who specialised in caring for patients with infectious diseases in fever hospitals, also known as isolation hospitals. She was a leading figure in the drive for better nursing education and a better-organised nursing profession, especially for fever nurses. As well as being matron of various fever hospitals, she was on the council of the Fever Nurses Association from its beginning in 1908. She played important roles in various other organisations working towards registration of qualified nurses, better training and other improvements for the profession.

== Family and training ==
Susan Alice Villiers, born on 6 September 1863 in Edmonton, Middlesex, was the daughter of Mary Ann (née Sharp) and John Fitzpatrick Villiers, a barrister, and had a private education. Her middle-class family with nine children was not wealthy, especially after her father died when she was eleven years old. In 1892 she began three years of training at St Bartholomew's Hospital (Barts), London, and worked there as a staff nurse for a year after she qualified, until March 1896. The matron at Barts was Isla Stewart, who was known to believe that the best possible post-qualification training for matrons was working with the Metropolitan Asylums Board (MAB), which ran institutions catering for the sick poor of London, including isolation hospitals. This may have encouraged Villiers to embark on a career with a series of MAB fever hospitals. She was one of the first generation of nurses to have the opportunity to train under a matron who was fully trained herself.

== Career ==
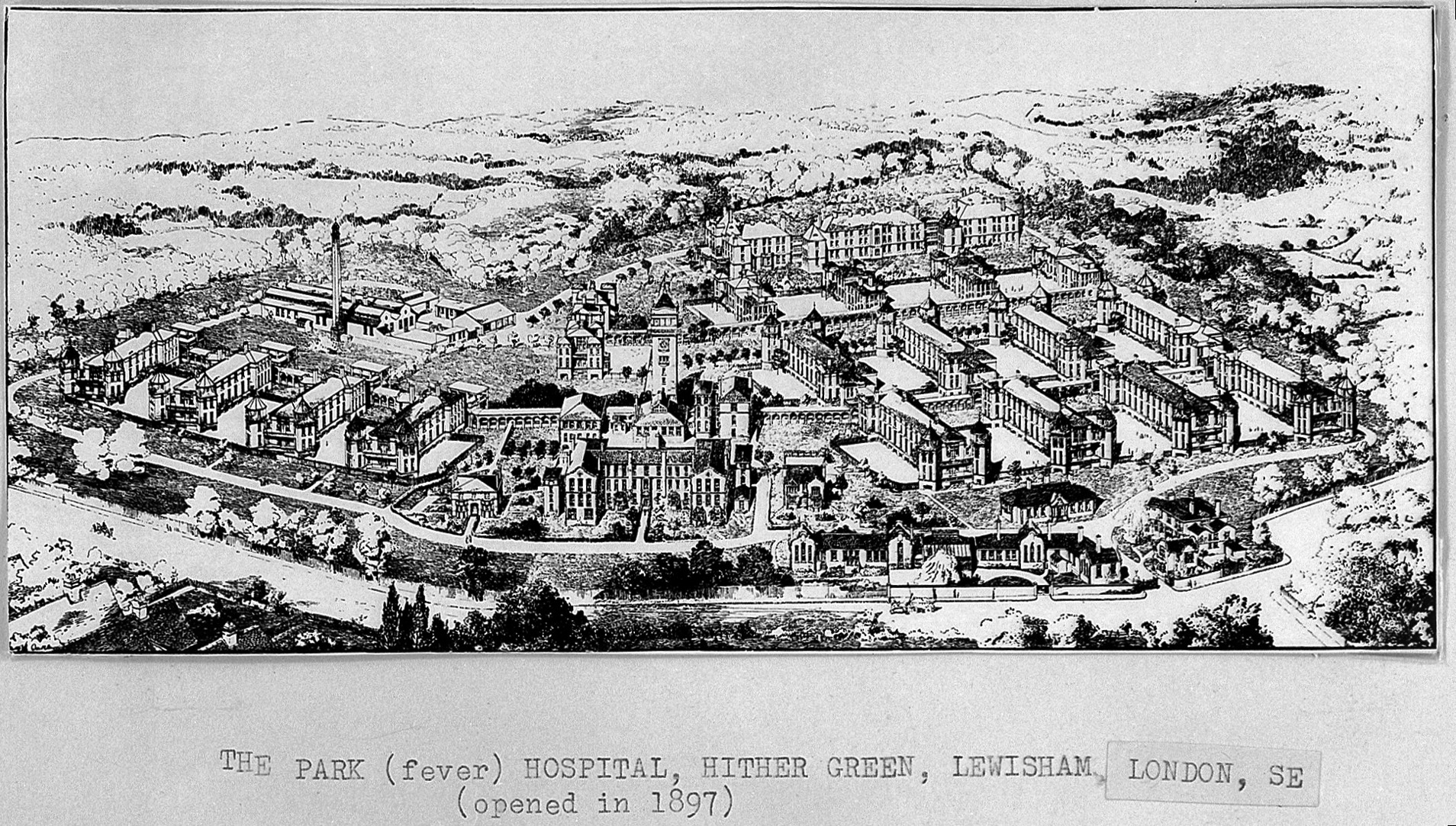
The Park Fever Hospital, where Villiers was matron between 1910 and 1913

After leaving Barts, Villiers spent the rest of her career specialising in fever nursing, although she took on other commitments as well.

=== Fever hospitals in London ===
In 1896, Villiers took a post as night superintendent at the South Eastern Fever Hospital in Deptford, and shortly after was made assistant matron at the Brook Hospital, Shooter's Hill. By 1901, she was matron of the Fountain Fever Hospital in Tooting. After that she moved to the Park Hospital, Hither Green before becoming matron of the South Western Hospital, Stockwell in 1913.

During the nineteenth century, the Metropolitan Asylums Board (MAB) built a number of fever hospitals around London. While patients received medical care they were removed from crowded neighbourhoods and isolated to help prevent epidemics. These hospitals were for working-class people from poor quality urban housing. More prosperous patients would generally be nursed at home. Hospital buildings had separate wards, which were often separate blocks, for different illnesses, and they were designed to provide plenty of fresh air with lofty ceilings and "airing courts" where patients could spend time outside, in sunshine as far as possible.

=== The Fever Nurses Association ===
The Fever Nurses Association (FNA) was established early in 1908. Later that year, Villiers was elected to be on its first council. The MAB gave the organisation its approval in 1909. One of the FNA's main aims was to create a universal standard of training for fever nurses in suitable, approved UK hospitals. The FNA wanted these to be large hospitals with a medical officer in residence. For trainees with no previous experience they planned a two-year training course and, for general nurses who had already trained at an approved hospital, a one-year training in fever nursing. Villiers was directly involved in these proposals, which led to an FNA-approved syllabus being drawn up in July 1909. Villiers also wanted the Association to ensure there was formal recognition for nurses who had both general and fever training when state registration of nurses was eventually established (1919). Once this happened and the General Nursing Council (GNC) was set up, Villiers was the fever nurse representative on it from 1920 to 1937. During this time her work on GNC committees helped lead it to adopt the educational curricula and other schemes drawn up by the FNA.

=== Other organisations and retirement ===
When state registration of nurses was introduced, Villiers was the seventh name in the new register. She was on the Matrons' Council of Great Britain and Ireland and represented it on the public health committee of the National Council of Women of Great Britain in 1926-1927. She was also a Fellow of the British College of Nurses, was on their Council, and was their delegate supporting equal suffrage at the National Union of Societies for Equal Citizenship (previously called the National Union of Women's Suffrage Societies). She worked for the right of nurses to manage their own professional bodies, and said, "People [are] very fond of managing women's affairs, especially those of nurses."

She retired in 1927 at the age of sixty-three after two troublesome episodes with her health in 1922 and 1924. This meant moving out of hospital quarters. She went to live near some of her siblings in Hertfordshire, where she served as a magistrate in Stevenage, as did two of her sisters and a brother. Villiers belonged to the Guild of St Barnabas, an Anglican society offering spiritual support to nurses, and became its Superior in 1935. During the Second World War she was the Hon. Treasurer of the National Council of Nurses Great Britain.

Late in life she moved to Hindhead, Surrey, where she died on 29 March 1945. Two weeks later, the Guild of St Barnabas arranged a requiem mass for her at the church of St Alban the Martyr, Holborn.

Villiers was described as charming, able to promote "a strong professional policy with gentle persistence", and someone who "quietly supported the interests and rights of women" while rising to "the height of her profession".
