= Annie McIntosh =

British nurse and nursing leader

Annie McIntosh CBE, RRC
- Born: 21 April 1871; Bromyard, Herefordshire
- Died: 20 September 1951 (aged 80); Bexhill, East Sussex
- Occupations: British nurse and nursing leader
- Years active: 1897-1927
- Employer(s): The London Hospital, St Bartholomew's Hospital

Annie Sophia Jane McIntosh CBE, RRC (21 April 1871 – 20 September 1951) was a British nurse and nursing leader. She was a Matron of St Bartholomew's Hospital, London (1910–1927), promoted the fledgling College of Nursing Ltd (now the Royal College of Nursing), and served on several wartime committees.

== Early life ==
McIntosh was born on 21 April 1871 in Bromyard, Herefordshire, one of at least nine children born to Donald McIntosh (1840–1909) and his wife, Elizabeth (née Lee; 1840–1915).

Donald McIntosh was a draper who became a wholesale clothier and a justice of the peace.

== Nursing career ==
Before McIntosh commenced nurse training at The London Hospital in March 1897, she worked as a governess and nursed at Borough Hospital, Birkenhead for two years. She was popular with both patients and staff and she was awarded 1st Prize in her final end of training examination. For the final six months of her training McIntosh worked as an assistant sister in the matron's office. This was where she worked for the rest of her career at The London Hospital. In 1905, she became Assistant Matron and later Chief Assistant Matron to Eva Luckes.

In June 1910, she was appointed as matron of St Bartholomew's Hospital. In 1913, during the ongoing debate about nurse registration, and the need for it, McIntosh was said to have banned a meeting in the hospital to discuss the legalization of Nurse Registration for trained nurses. Ethel Gordon Fenwick—a former matron of St Bartholomew's Hospital—was a leading supporter for centralised state registration for nurses.

However, the House Committee, Treasurer and Almoner prevented the meeting as they did not wish to influence the decision of their staff. In 1916, McIntosh was co-opted onto the council of the newly formed College of Nursing Ltd. She was one of the first nurses recorded on the College of Nursing's register and actively campaigned for legal registration for nurses. McIntosh worked for six years on the College of Nursing Council on both its provisional and elected councils. Probably to maintain neutrality amongst the various nursing bodies, McIntosh refused permission in 1927 for a meeting to be held at St Bartholomew's Hospital which promoted Ethel Gordon Fenwick's British College of Nurses. During World War I, McIntosh was also Principal Matron of the First London General hospital, Camberwell.

She also served on a number of committees, including:

- The War Office Committee for the Supply of Nurses (1916)
- The advisory board of Princess Mary's Royal Air Force Nursing Service
- The Prison Commissioners Advisory Nursing Board
- The Joint Voluntary Aid Detachment and United Services Committee
- Vice-chairman of the Nurses Insurance Society
- The Royal National Pension Fund for Nurses Benevolent Committee
- The Association of Hospital Matrons Executive
- Vice President of St Bartholomew's Hospital League of Nurses (1923–1925)
- President, St Bartholomew's Hospital League of Nurses (1925–1927)

== Honours ==
In 1917, McIntosh received the Royal Red Cross. She was awarded Commander of the British Empire for her "outstanding services at the hospital" in August 1917. In 1924, she was the recipient of the French Medaille d’Honneur (argent).

== Personal life ==
McIntosh retired in February 1927 because of exhaustion, initially living in Guildford. During the Second World War she lived in London where she interviewed auxiliary nursing candidates and packed parcels for prisoners of war. In 1945 McIntosh moved to Bexhill, East Sussex to be nearer her sisters. She had been disabled with arthritis for a while.

== Death ==
McIntosh died in Bexhill of pneumonia and osteoporosis on 20 September 1951, aged 80. Her office papers and correspondence from 1910 to 1927 are held by Barts Health Archives and Museum.

== Bibliography ==
- Hector, Winifred (1973). Mrs Bedford Fenwick. London: Royal College of Nursing and National Council of Nurses of the United Kingdom.
- Lost Hospitals of London [Available at: https://ezitis.myzen.co.uk, accessed on 13 August 2020].
- Rogers, Sarah (2020). "McIntosh, Annie Sophia Jane, (1871–1951)". Oxford Dictionary of National Biography (2020)
- Rogers, Sarah (2022). A Maker of Matrons’? A study of Eva Lückes's influence on a generation of nurse leaders:1880–1919 (Unpublished PhD thesis, University of Huddersfield, April 2022)
- Yeo, Geoffrey (1995). Nursing at Barts: A history of nursing service and nurse education at St Bartholomew's Hospital, London. Stroud: Alan Sutton Publishing.
