= Susan Villiers =

Susan Villiers may refer to:

- Susan Feilding, Countess of Denbigh (1583–1652), née Villiers, English courtier
- Susan Villiers (nurse) (1863–1945), English fever nurse and nursing leader
