= Homerton University Hospital =

Hospital in Homerton, London

- Homerton Healthcare NHS Foundation Trust
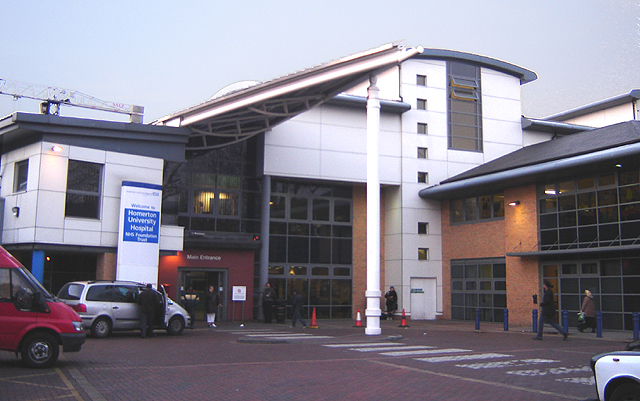
- Main entrance

- Shown in Hackney

Geography
- Location: Homerton, London, England
- Coordinates: 51.5504°N 0.0483°W

Organisation
- Care system: National Health Service
- Type: General
- Affiliated university: Barts and The London School of Medicine and Dentistry

Services
- Emergency department: Yes
- Beds: 500

History
- Founded: 5 July 1986

Links
- Website: www.homerton.nhs.uk

Homerton University Hospital is a teaching hospital in Homerton in the London Borough of Hackney. It is managed by Homerton Healthcare NHS Foundation Trust.

== History ==
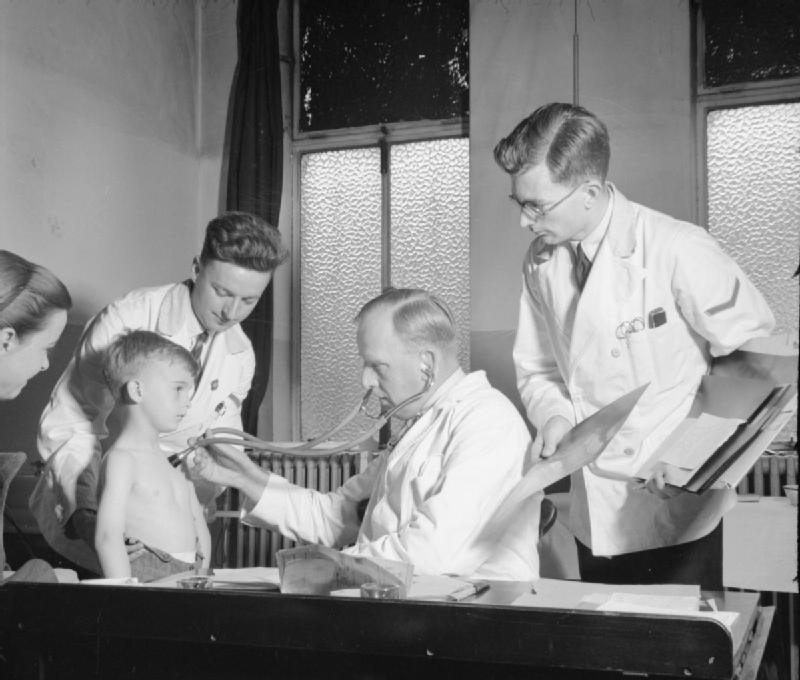
A chest examination at Hackney Hospital in 1943

The hospital has its origins in the Homerton Fever Hospital, which opened at the north of the current site in December 1870. A smallpox hospital, built on adjacent land, opened in February 1871.

The Eastern Fever Hospital became part of the London County Council as part of the reforms of the Local Government Act of 1929. At this time the hospital had 561 beds and the medical superintendent was HM Pereira LRPC, DPH. The steward was WW Spencer. The Matron was Miss Barcham. Barcham was President of the League of Fever Nurses (previously known as The Fever Nurses Association). She was also a Fellow of the British College of Nurses.

A new isolation block was built in 1935. The hospital joined the National Health Service in 1948 as the Eastern Hospital and became increasingly focused on neurological patients before closing down in 1982.

Construction of the new Homerton Hospital began in 1982 and was completed in July 1986. The hospital was built at a cost of £20 million and was opened by the Princess Royal in March 1987. As well as replacing the Eastern Hospital, the new hospital replaced the Mothers' Hospital Lower Clapton Road in Hackney, which closed in 1986, and the German Hospital on Ritson Road, which closed in 1987.

Clinical throughput increased further when the Hackney Hospital on Homerton High Street closed in 1995 and services were transferred to the current site.

The hospital was the designated hospital for the 2012 Summer Olympic and Paralympic Games.

== Services ==
The hospital services the East London borough of Hackney and also the City of London. Specialist care is provided in obstetrics, neonatology, fetal medicine, laparoscopic surgery, fertility, bariatric surgery, obesity surgery and neurorehabilitation.

The hospital directly employs 3500 staff. The hospital received "excellent" both for service quality and use of resources in the Care Quality Commission (CQC) ratings and top rating of 3 stars with the Healthcare Commission in 2009–10. It holds the level 2 NHS Litigation Authority rating for safety for both general and maternity services.

In October 2013 as a result of the Keogh Review the Trust was put into the highest risk category by the Care Quality Commission however the first CQC report following rated the A&E dept as 'outstanding'. In a 2020 report the CQC rated the hospital as outstanding overall.

Badges awarded to nurses who trained at Eastern Hospital from 1930 to 1948

== Teaching ==
The hospital serves as teaching hospital for medical students from Barts and The London School of Medicine and Dentistry as well as radiography students from City, University of London. It also provides post graduate training in all major specialities.

== Transport ==
London Buses routes 26, 30, 236, 242, 276, 308, 394, 425, 488, N242 and W15 serve the hospital. The nearest railway station is Homerton on the Mildmay line of the London Overground.

Badges for nurses who trained at Hackney Hospital

== In popular culture ==
In 2024, British rapper Loyle Carner revealed during his performance of Hugo: Reimagined (Live from the Royal Albert Hall) that his song Homerton was named after Homerton Hospital, where his son was born.

== See also ==
- List of hospitals in England
