= Fever Nurses Association =

The Fever Nurses Association was established in London in 1908.

The founder of the organisation was Dr Biernacki, who at that time was the Medical Superintendent of Plaistow Hospital, East London. He was succeeded by Dr McIntyre. Miss Minnie Drakard was the first Nurse President.

The governing body had 39 members: 20 doctors and 19 matrons and assistant matrons, mostly from fever hospitals and some from the hospitals run by the Metropolitan Asylums Board. Nurse Susan Villiers was a member. Miss Villiers represented fever nurses on the General Nursing Council.

It was associated with the campaign for nurse registration led by Ethel Bedford-Fenwick, and was represented on the Central Committee for the State Registration of Nurses which was established in 1908.

A scheme for training fever nurses was established after it was set up.

The Fever Nurses Association raised the standard of training in Fever Hospitals and preceded State Registration. Following State Registration examinations in fever nursing were conducted by the General Nursing Council. This resulted in a loss of revenue for the Fever Nurses Association. A Committee of Nurses reviewed the role of the Association and made a recommendation that a new Association should be formed. This was accepted and the new Association was called ‘The League of Fever Nurses’. In the 1915-1916 report it was noted there were 2,189 members holding the Fever Nurses’ Association Certificate.

== Miss Minnie Drakard SRN, RFN, FBCN ==
Drakard trained at Boston Hospital, Lincolnshire, and Nottingham General Hospital. During her time as Sister in Nottingham she worked in the fever house which was used by patients with typhoid fever. Drakard spent two years as Matron at Taunton Sanitary Hospital from 1893 before moving to Plaistow Hospital in 1895. On her arrival she undertook a two-year course in fever training, the first group of nurses being certificated in 1898. She was the Matron of Plaistow Hospital for 36.5 years retiring in 1932. During her time at Plaistow developments in fever work included the introduction of both preventive and curative serums, and bed isolation and barrier nursing to reduce the transmission of infections. Developments also included immunising staff against diphtheria and scarlet fever.

In 1915 Drakard went to Dunkirk to organise the nursing of a hospital for the Friends’ Ambulance Unit of the British Red Cross for cases of enteric fever among the French troops. Plaistow was renowned for being a leading training school for fever nurses. She was President of the Infectious Hospitals Matrons’ Association and a member and later Fellow of the British College of Nurses as well as a supporter of the State Registration of Nurses. During her retirement she was also the President of The League of Fever Nurses. Drakard died on 12 January 1941 at home in Datchworth.
