= St Bartholomew's Hospital =

Hospital in the City of London

- Barts Health NHS Trust
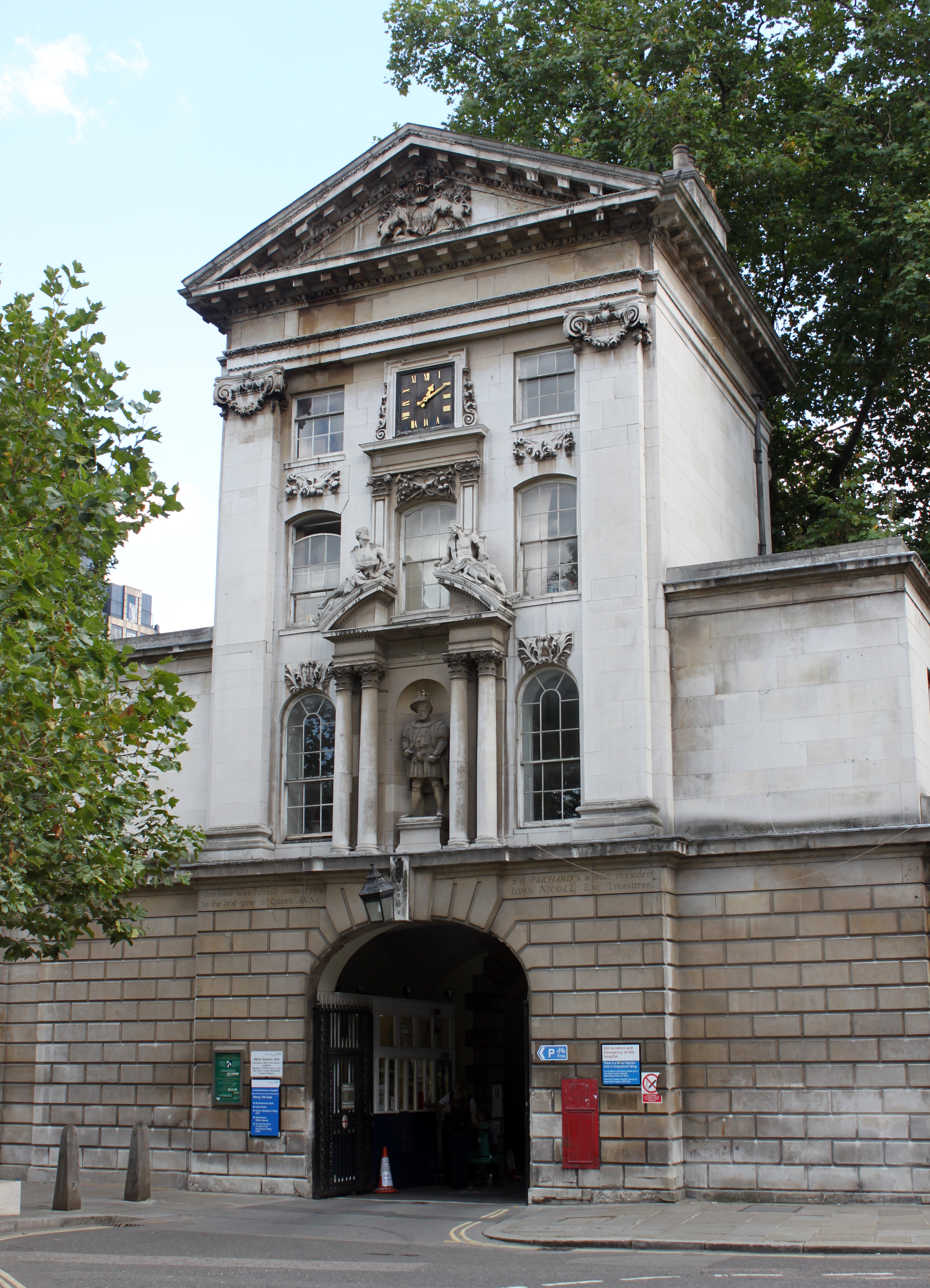
- The King Henry VIII Gate at Barts was completed in 1702

- Shown in the City of London

Geography
- Location: West Smithfield, London, England
- Coordinates: 51.5175°N 0.1001°W

Organisation
- Care system: National Health Service
- Type: Teaching
- Affiliated university: Barts and The London School of Medicine and Dentistry

Services
- Emergency department: No
- Beds: 387

History
- Founded: 1123; 903 years ago

Links
- Website: www.bartshealth.nhs.uk/st-bartholomews

St Bartholomew's Hospital, also known as Barts or St Barts, is a teaching hospital located in the City of London. It was founded in 1123 by Rahere, and is currently run by Barts Health NHS Trust.

== History ==
=== Early history ===
Barts was founded in 1123 by Rahere (died 1144, and entombed in the nearby Priory Church of St Bartholomew the Great), a favourite courtier of King Henry I. The dissolution of the monasteries did not affect the running of Barts as a hospital, but left it in a precarious position by removing its income. It was refounded by Henry VIII in December 1546, on the signing of an agreement granting the hospital to the Corporation of London.

The hospital became legally styled as the "House of the Poore in Farringdon in the suburbs of the City of London of Henry VIII's Foundation", although the title was never used by the general public. The first superintendent of the hospital was Thomas Vicary, sergeant-surgeon to King Henry, and an early writer on anatomy. It was here that William Harvey conducted his research on the circulatory system in the 17th century, Percivall Pott and John Abernethy developed important principles of modern surgery in the 18th century, and Mrs Bedford Fenwick worked to advance the nursing profession in the late 19th century.

From 1839 to 1872, the mortality reports show that surgical trauma and postoperative infection were the greatest causes of death. Tuberculosis, however, remained the most fatal nontraumatic cause of death. Nurses were expected to work 12 hours a day, and sometimes 14, with meal breaks in 1890. They had 2 weeks annual holiday. Upon the creation of the National Health Service in 1948, it officially became known as St Bartholomew's Hospital.

=== Buildings ===
Barts is the oldest hospital in Britain still providing medical services which occupies the site it was originally built on, and has an important current role as well as a long history and architecturally important buildings. The Henry VIII entrance to the hospital continues to be the main public entrance and features a statue of Henry VIII above the gate.

Its main square was designed by James Gibbs in the 1730s. Of the four original blocks, three survived; they include the block containing the Great Hall and two flanking blocks that contained wards. The first wing to be built was the North Wing, in 1732, which includes the Great Hall and the canvas paintings by William Hogarth. The South Wing followed in 1740, the West in 1752 and finally the East Wing in 1769. In 1859, a fountain was placed at the square's centre with a small garden.

St Bartholomew's Hospital has existed on the same site since its founding in the 12th century, surviving both the Great Fire of London and the Blitz. Its museum shows how medical care has developed over this time and explains the history of the hospital. Part-way around the exhibition is a door which opens on to the hospital's official entrance hall. On the walls of the staircase are two canvases painted by William Hogarth, The Pool of Bethesda (1736) and The Good Samaritan (1737). Hogarth was so outraged by the news that the hospital was commissioning art from Italian painters that he insisted on painting the canvases without a fee, as a demonstration that English painting was equal to the task. The Pool of Bethesda is of particular medical interest, as it depicts a scene in which Christ cures the sick: display material on the first floor speculates in modern medical terms about the ailments from which Christ's patients in the painting are suffering. The canvases were restored in the early 2020s, with a grant from the National Lottery Heritage Fund, and opened for public viewing in early Autumn 2025.

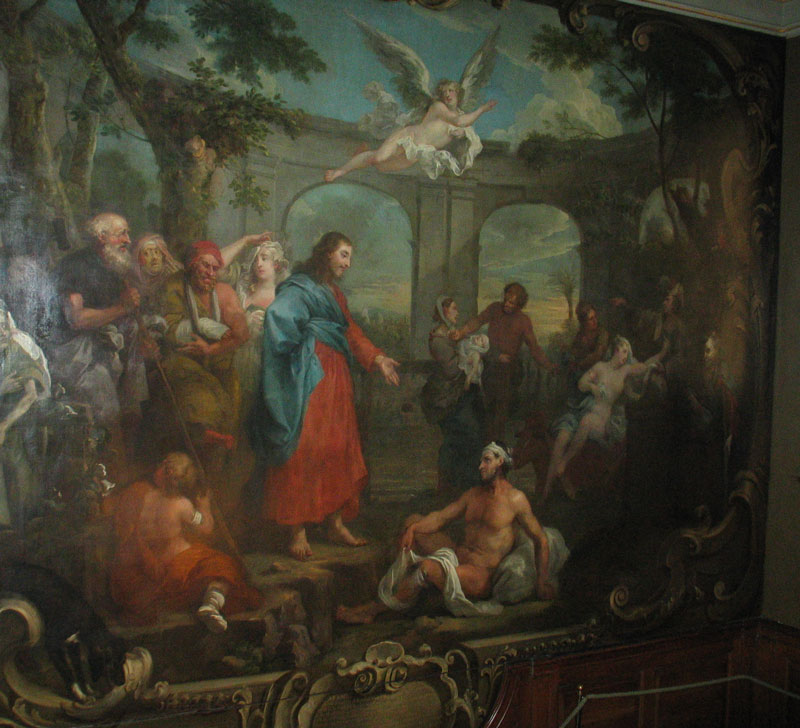
Hogarth's canvas painting of Christ at the Pool of Bethesda.

The room to which the staircase leads is the hospital's Great Hall, a double-height room in Baroque style. Although there are a few paintings inside the Great Hall, nearly all are on movable stands: the walls themselves are mostly given over to the display of the very many large, painted plaques which list, in detail, the sums of money given to the hospital by its benefactors.

Following the Dissolution of the Monasteries, the hospital precincts of the ancient priory were redesignated as an Anglican ecclesiastical parish, with St Bartholomew-the-Less becoming the parish church – a unique situation amongst English hospital foundations. St Barts-the-Less is the only survivor of five chapels originally within the hospital's estate, the others failing to survive the Reformation. The church has a 15th-century tower and vestry, and its connections with the hospital can be seen not only in its early-20th century stained glass window of a nurse, a gift from the Worshipful Company of Glaziers, but also in commemorative plaques adorning its interior.

Throughout the whole of the 19th century, the Hardwick family were major benefactors of the hospital. Thomas Hardwick Jr. (1752–1825), Philip Hardwick (1792–1870), and Philip Charles Hardwick (1822–1892) were all architects/surveyors to Barts Hospital. Philip Hardwick, a Royal Academician, was also engaged in the rebuilding of the Church of St Bartholomew-the-Less in 1823 and donated the fountain in the hospital's courtyard.

By 1872, Barts contained 676 beds. About 6,000 in-patients were admitted every year, as well as 101,000 out-patients. The average income of the hospital was £40,000 (derived chiefly from rents and funded property) and the number of governors exceeded 300.

=== Threatened closure ===
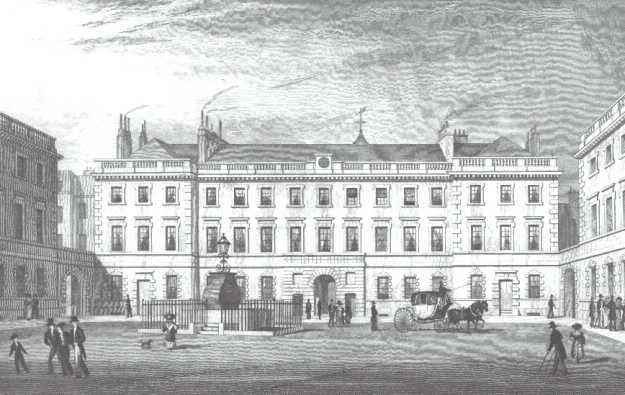
Barts' courtyard in the early 19th century

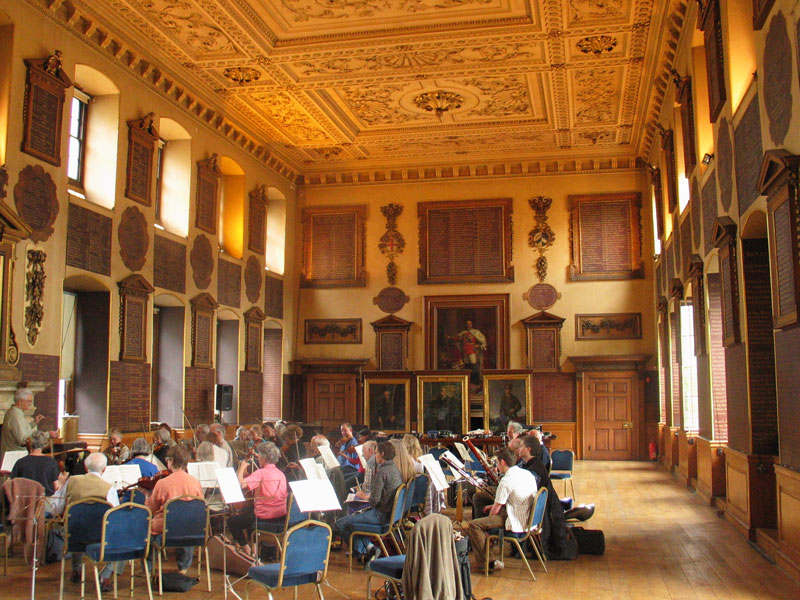
The Great Hall at Barts

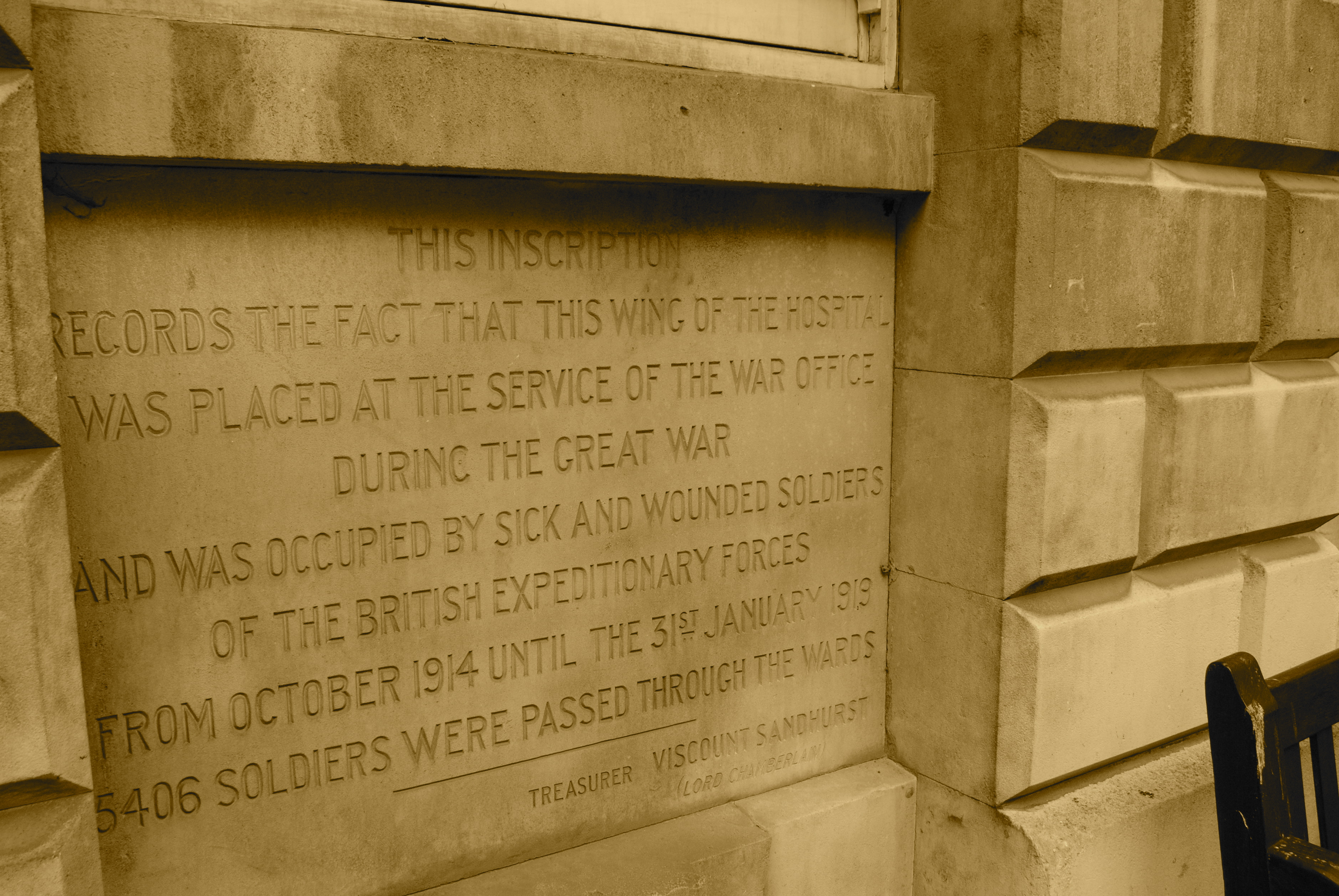
A memorial tablet on the courtyard-facing wall of the East Wing, stating that 5,406 soldiers passed through its wards during the First World War.

In 1993 the Tomlinson Review of London hospitals concluded that there were too many hospitals in central London and recommended that the service should be delivered closer to where people lived. Barts was identified as a hospital with a catchment area that had a low population and the hospital was threatened with closure. A determined campaign was mounted to save the hospital by the Save Barts Campaign, supported by staff, residents, local MPs and the City of London Corporation.

Some facilities were retained, but the accident and emergency department closed in 1995, with facilities relocated to the Royal London Hospital (a hospital in the same trust group, but a couple of miles away in Whitechapel). A minor injuries unit was established at Barts for small cases (which often represent a significant part of the workload of A&E services) but urgent and major work goes to other hospitals.

=== Redevelopment ===
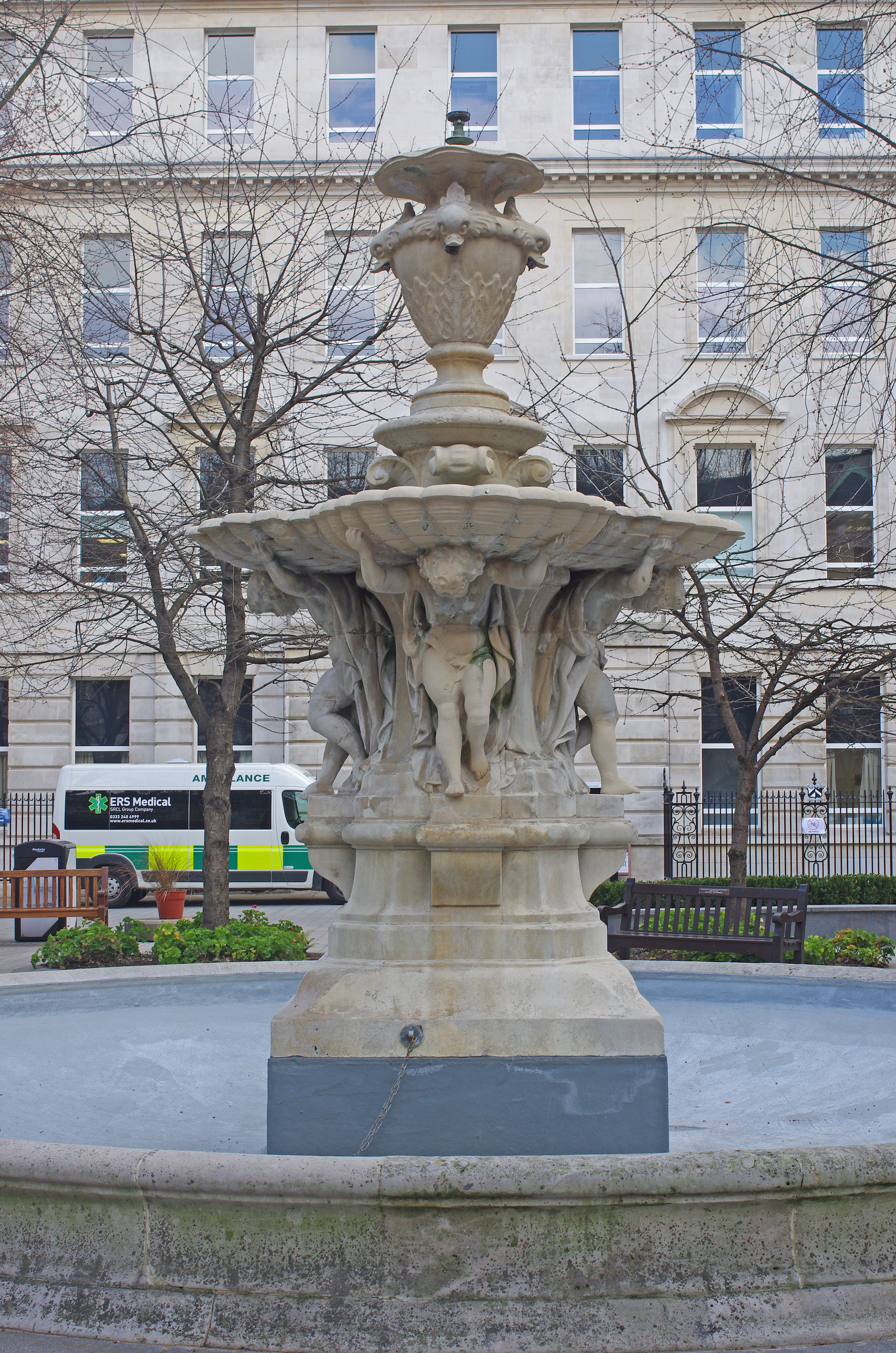
Fountain in the quadrangle of St Bartholomew's Hospital

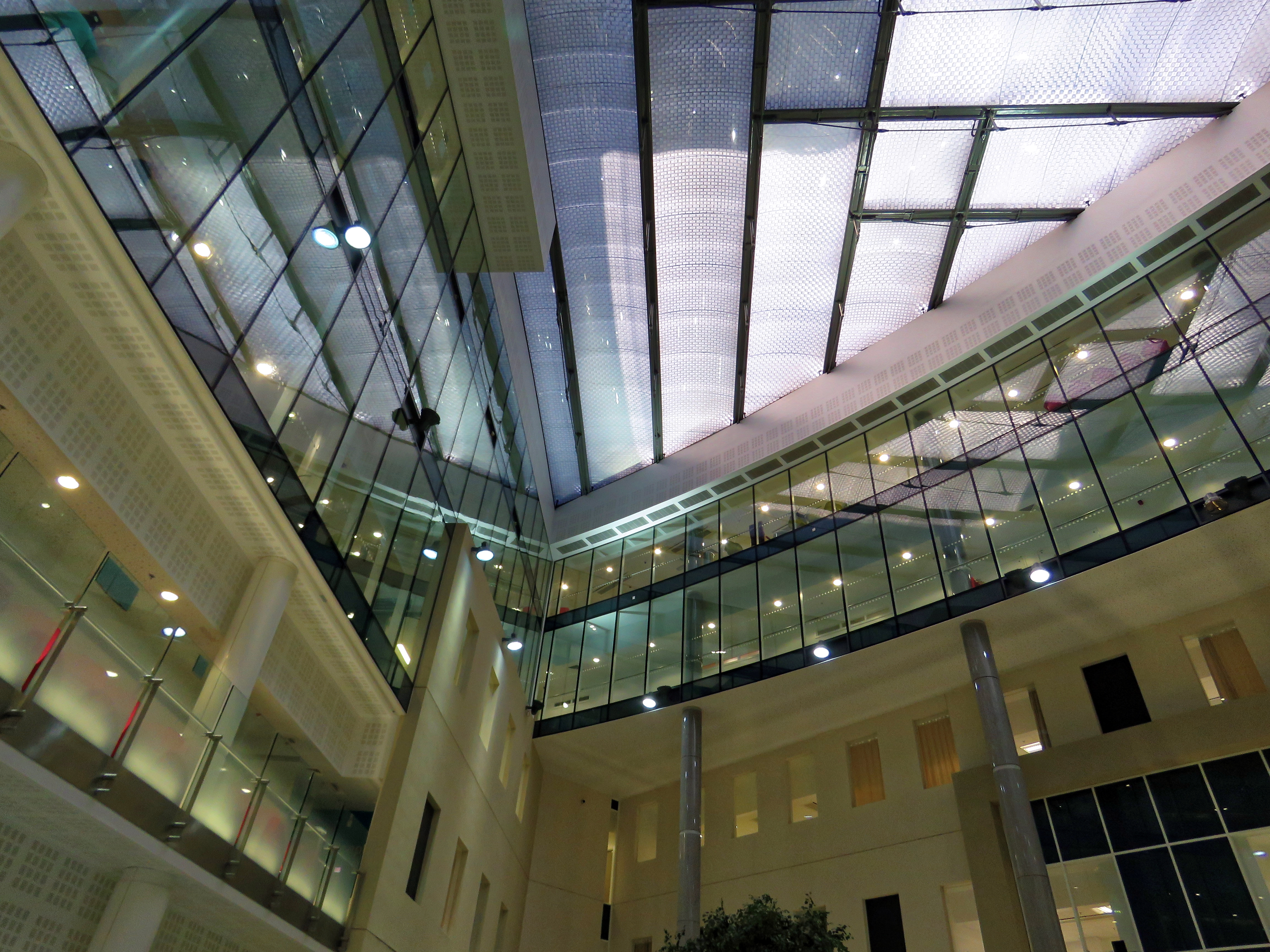
Atrium of St Bartholomew's Hospital following the redevelopment

A plan was formulated for Barts to develop as a centre of excellence in cardiac care and cancer. The plan came under threat when it was announced that the works would be procured under a private finance initiative contract; the Save Barts campaign continued to protest. The opposition subsided and a new Barts Heart Centre and new cancer care facilities were created. The Queen Mary Wing was demolished and the façade of the George V building was retained within a new hospital building. A new main entrance was established on King Edward Street. The three James Gibbs blocks were refurbished and car parking was removed from the area. The works, which were designed by HOK and undertaken by Skanska at a cost of circa £500 million, were completed in early 2016.

Barts continues to be associated with excellence at its medical school's significant research and teaching facilities on the Charterhouse Square site. Barts, along with the Royal London Hospital and London Chest Hospital, was part of Barts and The London NHS Trust. There are 388 beds in Barts and 675 beds in the Royal London. These hospitals amalgamated with Whipps Cross and Newham hospitals on 1 March 2012 to form the Barts Health NHS Trust.

=== Nuffield Health ===
In 2018, Nuffield Health, a not-for-profit healthcare organisation, was granted planning permission to redevelop the former pathology and residential staff quarters building into a new private hospital. It is the only private hospital in the City of London, and has 48 beds and 4 operating theatres. It opened in 2022, at a cost of £60 million. It is physically and operationally separate from the rest of the hospital, and known as Nuffield Health at St Bartholomew's Hospital. In autumn 2025, Nuffield Health announced that they were selling back the lease of Nuffield Health at St Bartholomew's Hospital to Barts Health NHS Trust, with the handover planned for December 2025. The site will be repurposed by Barts Health as a dedicated breast cancer centre of excellence, to be opened in early 2026.

== Teaching ==
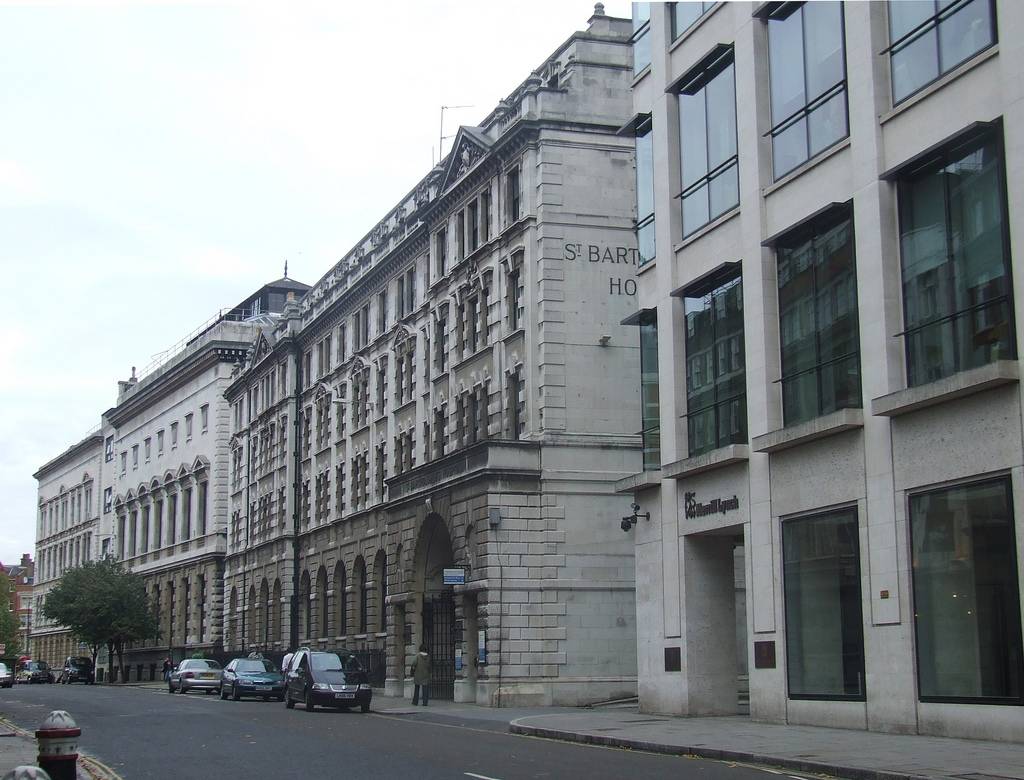
St Bartholomew's Hospital, looking towards Farringdon

In 1843, St Bartholomew's Hospital Medical College was established to train medics although considered to have been started by John Abernethy when the hospital built a theatre for his lectures at the beginning of the century. In 1995 the college, along with that attached to the Royal London, merged into Queen Mary University of London, but maintains a distinctive identity. It is now known as Barts and The London School of Medicine and Dentistry. It occupies some space at the Barts site in Farringdon, with a presence a short walk away at Charterhouse Square. The main preclinical teaching domain of the medical school is at Whitechapel in the award-winning Blizard Building.

In 1968 Winifred Hector established one of the first university courses for nurses, while at Barts at City, University of London, beginning in 1968. The present School of Nursing and Midwifery was formed in 1994 from merging the Schools from St Bartholomew's Hospital and the Royal London Hospital to become the St Bartholomew School of Nursing & Midwifery. In 1995 the new School was incorporated into the City University. Both Schools have a strong and respected history dating back over 120 years and have produced many nurse leaders and educators. The School has since been incorporated into the School of Health and Medical Sciences, City St George's, University of London.

== Notable staff ==
- Ethel Gordon Fenwick, Matron 1881–1887
- Isla Stewart, Matron 1887–1910
- Tom Armstrong Bowes – house surgeon 1895–1897.
- Rachael Cox-Davies night sister, home sister and sister of Faith Ward (1896–9); first secretary of the League of St. Bartholomew's Nurses and founding member of the Royal College of Nursing
- Beatrice Cutler Assistant Matron 1907–1920 and founding member of the League of St. Bartholomew's Nurses
- Helen Dey (1886–1968) Matron of St Bartholomew's Hospital 1927-1949.
- Kathleen Halpin (1903–1999), public servant and feminist
- Mary Harfield 1879–1970, nurse and archaeologist
- Winifred Hector nurse-tutor from 1941 to 1970 and author of four key nursing texts, who established one of the first university courses for nurses at St George's, University of London in 1968 while at Barts.
- Annie McIntosh, Matron 1910–1927, trained between 1897 and 1899 at The London Hospital under Matron Eva Luckes. McIntosh then worked as a Sister in Matron's office, and as an Assistant Matron between 1899 and 1910. During the First World War she was a member of the War Office Committee for the Supply of Nurses and Principal Matron, 1st London General Hospital in Camberwell.
- Pamela Hibbs 1935–2021 qualified at St. Bartholomew's in 1958 gaining the finalist gold medal. Hibbs held varied posts and in 1976 was seconded to improve the failing Hackney Hospital. In 1978 she had a key role in planning for the new Homerton Hospital. In 1994 on the merger of Barts and the Royal London Hibbs was appointed as Chief Nurse across the Royal Hospitals Trust, she retired in 1997.
- Evelyn Marguerite [known as Margot] Turner (1910–1993), student nurse (1931–1934) then staff nurse (1934–1936), later Matron-in-Chief of Queen Alexandra's Royal Army Nursing Corps (QARANC) and Director, Army Nursing Services (1964–1968) and was colonel-commandant of QARANC from 1969 to 1974.

== Hospital museums and archive ==
St Bartholomew's Hospital museum tells the historical narrative of the hospital and its work in caring for the sick and injured. The museum collections include historic surgical instruments, sculptures, medieval archives, and works of art, including paintings by William Hogarth. The museum is located under the North Wing archway. It closed in September 2023 for renovation works, expected to last through 2024. The collections are searchable on the Barts Health NHS Trust online catalogue, which contains information on over 50,000 entries and covering an 800-year span.

Also on the site is the Barts Pathology Museum, which has over 4,000 medical specimens on display and has been described by CNN as one of the "world's 10 weirdest medical museums". The museum is open only by appointment and for special events. Both museums are part of the London Museums of Health & Medicine group.

Barts Health Archive holds collections from 1137 to the present day, including records related to staff, patients, buildings and management of the hospitals in the current Barts Health group, as well as numerous other hospitals, institutions, charities, organisations and individuals relating to health care and training in the City and East London. Hospital Archives held by Barts include: Albert Dock Seamen's Hospital, Alexandra Hospital for Children with Hip Disease, Bethnal Green Hospital, Royal Brompton Hospital, East Ham Memorial Hospital, East London Hospital for Children, Homerton Fever Hospital, German Hospital, Dalston, Hackney Hospital, Harefield Hospital, London Chest Hospital, (Royal London Hospital, Mildmay Mission Hospital, Mile End Hospital, National Heart Hospital, Newham University Hospital, Poplar Hospital, St Andrew's Hospital, Bow St Clement's Hospital, St Leonard's Hospital, Hackney, and Whipps Cross University Hospital. Most records are available for research by appointment.

In March 2026 Channel 5 broadcast 'Our Hospital Through Time' presented by Alice Roberts a six part series exploring the hospital through historical and contemporary themes using the Barts Health Archive.

== Sherlock Holmes and Dr Watson ==
A chemical laboratory at Barts was the location of the initial meeting of Sherlock Holmes and Dr. Watson in Arthur Conan Doyle's 1887 novel A Study in Scarlet. Barts was Watson's alma mater. This fictional connection led to a donation by the Tokyo "Sherlock Holmes Appreciation Society" to the Save Barts Campaign in the 1990s.

In 2012, the final episode of the second series of the BBC drama Sherlock, "The Reichenbach Fall", had Holmes appearing to have deliberately leapt to his death from the roof of St Bartholomew's as a surrogate for the waterfall of the original story "The Final Problem". The hospital was again used as the location for the resolution to Holmes' faked suicide, in the first series three episode "The Empty Hearse".

== Transport ==
London Buses routes 4, 8, 17, 25, 45, 46, 56, 59, 63, 76, 100, 153, 172, 242, N8, N63 and N76 serve the hospital, with bus stops located outside or near the hospital. The nearest Underground stations are Barbican and Farringdon on the Circle, Hammersmith & City and Metropolitan lines and St Paul's on the Central line. Farringdon is also served by Thameslink trains.

== Patient entertainment ==
Since 2022 Bedrock Radio (a registered charity) broadcasts to St Bartholomew's Hospital and wider Barts Health Trust. Bedrock replaced Whipps Cross Hospital Radio (WXHR) who formerly served the Trust from 1969 to 2022.

== Arms ==
Coat of arms of St Bartholomew's Hospital
Notes Also known as the 'Wakering shield' adopted from the arms of a 15th century master of the hospital Escutcheon Per pale Argent and Sable a chevron counterchanged.
