= Association of Hospital Matrons =

- Merged into: Royal College of Nursing Association of Nursing Management in January 1987
- Successor: Association of Nurse Administrators (1972-1986)
- Formation: 1919
- Dissolved: 1986
- Founding President: Joan Clague

The Association of Hospital Matrons was a professional organization of hospital matrons in the United Kingdom, founded in 1919. At its meeting on 23 December 1971 it changed its name in to the Association of Nurse Administrators from January 1972. It was officially dissolved on 31 December 1986, and amalgamated with the Royal College of Nursing Association of Nursing Management in January 1987.

== History ==
The Association of Hospital Matrons began as a rival to the Matrons' Council for Great Britain and Ireland, an organisation founded in 1894 by Isla Stewart and Ethel Gordon Fenwick. By 1919 there was disaffection with Fenwick's approach so Rachael Cox-Davies and Alicia Lloyd Still invited some 50 matrons, resulting in a turn-out of 21 at the founding meeting of the Association at St Thomas’ Hospital on 15 April 1919. Most attendees were matrons from the London teaching hospitals, with representatives from the Royal College of Nursing (Miss Rundle) and the War Office (Miss Riddel for the matrons-in-chief of defence).

The founding resolution set it out as an Association 'of trained nurses who hold or have held the position of matron or superintendent of hospitals or institutions concerned in the training of nurses and the care of the sick’. April 1919 was in the midst of parliamentary discussions on the State Registration of nursing and the establishment of the General Nursing Council and the formation of the Association reflected this.

In 1919, some 80 matrons joined the Association from across the country, mainly from hospitals, but including 13 matrons of poor law infirmaries. By June 1920 it had 367 members: 135 matrons of general hospitals; 104 'special' matrons; 25 matrons of military hospitals; 35 matrons of poor law infirmaries; 41 superintendents of nursing institutions, and 27 retired matrons.

Some matrons were members of the Association alongside their pre-existing membership of the National Association of Workhouse Masters and Matrons which was formed in 1897 and was renamed as the National Association of Masters and Matrons of Poor Law Institutions c.1915. This remained in existence as the Association of Health and Residential Care Officers, until it dissolved in 1984 for reasons similar to those that put an end to the ANA.

The Association was a network of local branches with a central executive committee which met monthly in London. "Its aim was to consider professional matters and provide a forum where proposed legislative changes affecting the nursing profession could be considered and commented upon" - E Scott.

The Scottish Association of Nurse Administrators also run by honorary officers, began in 1910 as the Scottish Matrons’ Association, and provided professional advice to its members. The first meeting took place in Edinburgh on March 3^{rd} 1910. The first President was A.W. Gill, RRC, of the Royal Infirmary Edinburgh. Vice Presidents included Miss Cowper, Superintendent of the Scottish branch of the QVJNI, Miss Duff from Dundee, Miss Macnaughton from Aberdeen, Janet Melrose from Glasgow Royal Infirmary and Gregory Smith from the Western Infirmary Glasgow. The Scottish Association of Nurse Administrators held its final annual conference in April 1987, before closing after a 76-year history.

The Royal Society of Health provided office space to the Association of Nurse Administrators almost to the end of its existence.

The 1966 Salmon Report replaced the matrons of smaller hospitals with senior nursing officers and nursing officers, reducing the number of people eligible for membership of the Association.

At its meeting on 23 October 1971 the Association changed its name to become The Association of Nurse Administrators.

In 1972 it merged with the Mental Hospital Matrons’ Association, the Association of Chief and Principal Nursing Officers (Mental Health Service) and the Association of Chief Nursing Officers (Public Health) which stabilised membership.

The 1974 NHS reorganisation brought a slight uplift in members when the Association merged with the Association of Chief Male Nurses.

The Association was integral to nursing discussions on the 1982 restructuring of the NHS. It initiated the joint memoranda on management and budgeting issued jointly by the Royal College of Nursing, the Royal College of Midwives, the Health Visitors Association and the Association. It spearheaded a campaign to improve the prison nursing service. Much of this was whilst Maureen Fraser Gamble OBE was honorary secretary after she had retired as district nursing officer at the Hammersmith Hospital in 1980.

When it closed, the Association remained a part-time organisation staffed by voluntary officers. These included: president Joan Clague; honorary secretary Maureen Fraser Gamble.

=== Presidents ===
The Presidents of the Association of Hospital Matrons and then the Association of Nurse Administrators were: 1919 Joan Clague (Acting President) 1919-1937; Dame Alicia Lloyd Still; 1937–1949 Miss Helen Dey; 1949-1951 Mrs E O Jackson; 1952-1957 Miss Dorothy Smith (nurse); 1958-1962 Dame Muriel Powell; 1963-1965 Miss Marjorie J Marriott; 1965-1969 Miss Helen M Downton CBE; 1969-1972 Dame Phyllis Friend; 1972-1975 Miss Constance Biddulph; 1976-1979 John Greene (nurse); and 1979-1983 Audrey Emerton, Baroness Emerton.

=== Notable Members ===
Active members included Grace Margery Westbrook and Beatrice Monk.
