= Winifred Hector =

English nurse and textbook author

Winifred Emily Hector FRCN
- Hector in her autobiography
- Born: 1909
- Died: 2002 (aged 92–93)
- Occupation: Nurse educator
- Employer(s): Manchester Royal Infirmary, St Bartholomew's Hospital

Winifred Emily Hector FRCN (21 December 1909 — 14 September 2002) was an English nurse and textbook author. She played a significant part in introducing modern curriculum and teaching methods to British nursing education.

== Early life and education ==
Winifred Emily Hector was born at Taunton in Somerset, the daughter of Sidney Charles Hector and Beatrice Dugdale Hector. Her father was an engine driver on the Great Western Railway. She attended Bishop Fox's School in Taunton, and completed 2 years of undergraduate study in English at Bedford College, London. However her near-sightedness ended her academic studies, so she turned her attention to nursing, as a student at St. Bartholomew's Hospital. Much later in life, she was awarded a Master of Philosophy (MPhil) degree at City University London, with research on the life of Ethel Gordon Fenwick, SRN 1, the first nurse on the General Nursing Council register 1921 [a ref] and a founder of the International Council of Nurses.

== Career ==
Hector trained as a nurse at St. Bartholomew's Hospital, London where she was "taught by a very frosty tutor", with a very formal and rigid approach. [a ref].

Hector was in charge of nurses' preliminary training at the Manchester Royal Infirmary at the beginning of World War II. She then ran a surgical ward at St. Bartholomew's Hospital during the London Blitz, treating mainly acute injuries of bombing victims. She moved into teaching, taking the position of senior tutor at the war's end. She established "one of the first university courses for nurses," at City, University of London, beginning in 1968.

Textbooks by Winifred Hector included Modern Gynaecology and Obstetrics For Nurses (1956, with John Howkins, revised 1963 and 1974 with Gordon Bourne), Modern Nursing: Theory and Practice (1960), A Textbook of Medicine for Nurses (1967, with Gordon Hamilton Fairley), and Nursing Care for the Dying Patient (1982). She also wrote an autobiography, Memoirs of a Somerset Woman (1997), and a book about nursing for lay readers, The Role of the Nurse (1977). Such was the success of her publications that in 1970 her publisher Heinemann hosted a champagne lunch in her honour at the Ritz.

Between 1961 and 1963 Hector was a member of the influential Platt Committee on Nursing Education for the Royal College of Nursing, led by Harry Platt which published as the Platt Report 1964.

She retired from St. Bartholomew's in 1970. For a decade after she retired, she was the lecturer in charge of the 2 year Sister Tutor's Diploma Course at Queen Elizabeth College. until the final cohort completed in 1980. In 1970, she was one of the founding members of the board of the Medical Recording Service, a body founded to support quality film and audio productions for medical education. In 1976, she was made a Fellow of the Royal College of Nursing. In 1978, she was script adviser on a series of ten films for nursing education.

Winifred Hector died in 2002, after several years of ill health, in London, aged 91 years.
