= Beatrice Monk =

(1882–1962) hospital matron

Beatrice Mary Marsh Monk RRC CBE COSTJ
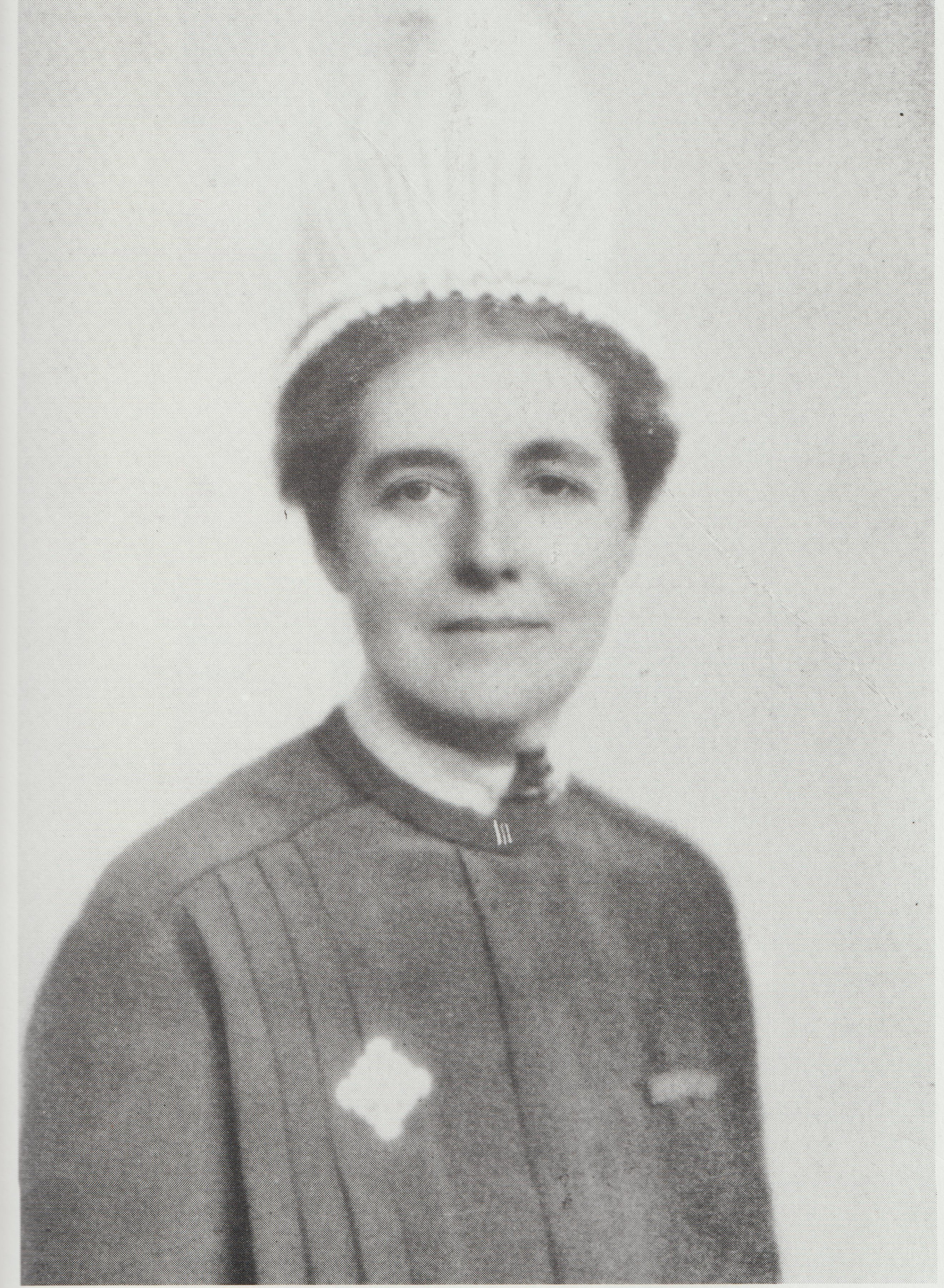
- Born: 1885
- Died: 1962 (aged 76–77)
- Education: The London Hospital
- Occupations: Nursing Leader and President of the College of Nursing

Beatrice Mary Marsh Monk (23 August 1882 - 2 June 1962) CBE, RRC COSTJ was a nursing leader, Eva Luckes' successor as matron of The London Hospital, and President of the College of Nursing (now RCN).

== Early life ==
Beatrice Mary Marsh Monk, also known as Mary, was born on 31 August 1882 in the Wirral, Cheshire. She was the seventh child of at least nine born to her father John Monk, a farmer with 300 acres who employed 14 men, and her mother Elizabeth Isabel. Her father died before Monk was ten years old.

== Nursing Career ==
Monk started her nursing career at the Hospital for Women in Liverpool. In 1904 she began her general nurse training under Eva Luckes at The London Hospital in Whitechapel, East London. After completing her training in 1906 Monk was a before being appointed assistant matron in 1910.

Whilst senior assistant matron to Luckes, Monk became House Steward which she continued until Luckes died in 1919 and Monk succeeded her mentor as matron. Monk was matron of The London from 1919-1931.

In 1931 she founded The London Hospital League of Nurses, and was appointed as first President of the league. This league is one of the few remaining nurses league's in London. Monk wanted to reduce nurses working hours, and supported a 48 hour working week. Monk was founding President of the League London Hospital Nurses, 1931-1934. Monk was actively involved in the National Council for Nurses (NCN), and was Honorary Treasurer. She was also on the executive committee of the Association of Hospital Matrons and the council of the College of Nursing.

== Retirement and death ==
Following her retirement as matron in 1931 Monk volunteered on a variety of military and prison advisory boards. She was on the Advisory Nursing Board to HM Prison Commissioners and led many reforms. She was a keen member of the College of Nursing from 1918, and an early registrant, no. 1093 and was President, 1938-1940. Monk was Regional Matron for the Joint War Organisation of the British Red Cross and the Order of St John of Jerusalem, Eastern Division from 1940-1946.

Until the late 1950s, Monk had appointments Ipswich Regional Hospital Board, and the House Committee, and was on the Norfolk and Norwich Hospital Management Committee.

After her retirement she lived firstly with her close friend Irene Paulin, daughter of London Hospital treasurer William Paulin, at Thorpe Abbotts for thirty years and secondly at Bramford, Ipswich. Monk died on 2 June at her home in Bramford and her cremation was held at Ipswich Crematorium on 7 June 1962. She left £33257 to her nephew and niece.

== Honours ==
Monk was awarded a Royal Red Cross 1st class (Civil Division) in 1920 for her work as House Steward of The London, the capital's largest voluntary hospital, during the First World War.

She was appointed Commander of the Order of the British Empire in 1929.

In 1931 Monk was made Commander of the Order of St John of Jerusalem for her contribution to nursing.
