= Mildred Hughes (nurse) =

Mildred Hughes MBE
- Born: 1890; Great Torrington
- Died: 1972 (aged 81–82); Leicester
- Occupation: Matron
- Employer: Leicester Royal Infirmary
- Organization: Royal College of Nursing

Mildred Florence Hughes MBE (17 April 1890 – 17 September 1972) was a British nurse who served as matron of Leicester Royal Infirmary from 1929 to 1946, head sister-in-chief of the Naval Nursing Service from 1929 to 1934 and president of the Royal College of Nursing from 1944 to 1946.

Hughes was born in Great Torrington, Devon, on 17 April 1890. Her parents were Frederick Charles Hughes, a Baptist minister and Henrietta, who were listed on the 1891 census, living in Blisworth, Northamptonshire.

== Training and career ==
Hughes started training in 1910 at the Evelina London Children's Hospital and Guy's Hospital, qualifying in 1917. She was amongst the first wave of qualified nurses who registered with the General Nursing Council for England and Wales - she became registrant 7185 on 22nd September 1922. She subsequently became ward sister and night sister at Guy's Hospital. She was Matron of the Infants Hospital, Westminster, from 1922 until her appointment to Leicester in 1929. during her time there she qualified with a Diploma in Children's Nursing from the University of London in 1928.

She spent most of her career, nearly twenty years, as matron of Leicester Royal Infirmary from 1929 until her retirement in 1946. She was President of the Leicester Royal Infirmary Nurses' League from February 1934 and was an active member of Soroptimist International in Leicester.

== Royal College of Nursing ==
Hughes was a committed active member of the Royal College of Nursing (RCN). She joined as a newly qualified nurse in 1918 as member 10254. From 1933 she was elected an RCN council member. Hughes was appointed to the Nurses Salaries Committee by Rushcliffe where she represented the RCN 1941-1943. She was President of the RCN for two years (1944-1946), and upon retirement became Chair of the RCN Council from 1947-1949

== Retirement and death ==
In retirement she also became an Inspector of Nurse Training Schools for the General Nursing Council for England and Wales. She was also nominated by the Prince of Wales Hospital Nurses League to become a Vice President of the National Council of Nurses of the United Kingdomin 1946. She was well known in Leicester for her work for the British Red Cross and was appointed a Member of the Most Excellent Order of the British Empire (MBE) in the 1964 New Years Honours for her services to them.

She died in Leicester on 17 September 1972 with a memorial service on 26 October held in the hospital chapel of Leicester Royal Infirmary.

== Legacy ==
In 1973 the Leicester Royal Infirmary Nurses’ League announced their intention to donate a memorial window in the hospital chapel. The stained glass window was subsequently installed 'north to south', depicting Saint Ursula with a nurse in uniform protected beneath St Ursula's gown, with the inscription 'Mildred Florence Hughes Matron Leicester Royal Infirmary 1929-45'. A brass plaque was inscribed 'This window was given in memory of Mildred Florence Hughes by members of the Leicester Royal Infirmary Nurses’ League and other friends'.

The chapel was subsequently removed, but this stained glass was saved and moved to the Odames Library in the Hospital
