= Lucy Duff Grant =

British nurse (1894 – 1984)

Lucy Duff Grant OBE RRC RN
- Born: 12 June 1894
- Died: 27 January 1984 (aged 89)
- Education: St. Thomas Hospital
- Occupations: Nurse and matron
- Years active: 1916–1976
- Known for: Leader of the Nursing Profession
- Awards: OBE, RRC

Lucy Gwendoline Duff Grant (12 June 1894 – 27 January 1984), was a British nurse, matron, President of the Royal College of Nursing (1951–53) and leader of her profession.

== Early life ==
Duff Grant was born 12 June 1894 in Sydenham London, eldest of two daughters of Edith and Lachlan Gordon Duff Grant. She was educated in London, Germany, and Paris. In 1913 she was noted as the first English woman to fly in a Zeppelin at the invitation of Count Zeppelin. She attended the Byam Shaw School of Art (1913–15).

== Early nursing career ==
Duff Grant first completed Red Cross and St John Ambulance Voluntary Aid Detachment training at St. Thomas Hospital, London in 1915, before entering nurse training in 1916 at the same hospital under Matron Lloyd Still. Duff Grant undertook midwifery training before becoming a ward sister. She studied for a sister tutor qualification at King's College for Household and Social Science in 1922 and took up post as principal tutor at the General Infirmary in Leeds. After gaining a diploma in nursing at University of Leeds, she was appointed assistant matron at the General Infirmary in 1927.

== Later nursing career ==
In 1929, on the retirement of Matron Margaret Sparshott, Duff Grant was appointed matron of the Manchester Royal Infirmary (MRI). a position she held for 26 years. Duff Grant was noted for improving the training, working conditions and pay for nurses at the MRI throughout the years of her matronship. With the establishment of the National Health Service in 1947 she was appointed a member of the Manchester Regional Hospital Board. Duff Grant retired as matron of MRI in January 1955 and in the same year was awarded an honorary MA degree from the University of Manchester.

Duff-Grant was also a member of Territorial Army Nursing Service (TANS), appointed as principal matron for the 2nd Western General Hospital in 1929 and the 5th Western General Hospital from 1937. She attended George VI’s coronation in 1937 in her military uniform. Duff Grant led the nursing staff of the MRI through the second world war in caring for wounded allied soldiers and prisoners of war, as well as during the Manchester Blitz (in which the nurses home received a direct hit ). She was awarded the Royal Red Cross First Class in 1942. After the war Duff Grant travelled overseas with the Territorial Army Nursing Service and became involved with the work of the American Jewish Joint Distribution Committee, which sought her hospitality at MRI in retraining Jewish nurses who had been forbidden to nurse under the Nazis. Duff-Grant relinquished her TANS commission in 1950.

== Professional, national and international activities ==
Duff Grant was a member of the College of Nursing, later the Royal College of Nursing (RCN), from 1916 onwards. She was active at a national level attending the International Hospital Association meeting in Paris in 1937 and in the same year gave evidence to the government interdepartmental committee on nursing services (the Athlone Committee), on the terms, conditions and pay for nurses. In 1950 Duff Grant succeeded Dame Louisa Wilkinson as president of the RCN, serving for two years. From 1951 to 1957 she was also president of the National Council of Nurses (an organization that merged with the RCN in 1963).

Duff Grant's was an elected member of the General Nursing Council for England and Wales (GNC) from 1937 to 1955 where she was a member, and then chairman, of the Education Committee. Duff Grant also represented the Queen Elizabeth, the Queen Mother, on the board of The Queen's Institute for District Nurses.

In 1953 she travelled for the British Council to advise on nursing in Turkey and Cyprus, and, nominated by the RCN, she became the European representative on the International Council of Nurses and a vice president.

As a practicing Anglican, she was a member of the Guild of St Barnabas throughout her nursing career, becoming president and chairman 1953–1980. She was awarded an OBE in 1980 as president of the Guild of St. Barnabas.

In 1955, she took a voluntary role as the headquarters training advisor to St. John's Ambulance, later becoming the chief nursing officer (1959–1965). In 1965 she was made a Dame of Grace of the Order of St John of Jerusalem.

== Awards and honours ==
Royal Red Cross 1942.

Dame of the Order of St John 1965.

Officer of the British Empire 1980.

Honorary MA Manchester University 1955.

An education fund was named in her honour by the Nurses’ Fellowship at MRI.

A plaque commemorating Duff Grant's contribution to the nursing profession was installed in 2017 on the walls of Manchester Royal Infirmary.

== Death ==
Lucy Duff Grant died of cardiac failure at St John Nursing Home, Whitstable, Kent, on 27 January 1984. Her body was cremated. A service of thanksgiving for her life was held in the chapel of St Thomas's Hospital in March 1984.
