= Helen Dey =

Helen Dey (1886–1968) CBE, RRC Matron of St Bartholomew's Hospital

Helen Dey CBE RRC
- Born: 1886
- Died: 5 June 1969 (aged 82–83)
- Occupation: nurse
- Employer: St Bartholomew's Hospital
- Organization(s): Royal College of Nursing, General Nursing Council, National Council of Nurses

Print photograph of Helen Dey, Matron at St Bartholomew's Hospital 1927–1949

Helen Dey (1886–1968) CBE, RRC was Matron of St Bartholomew's Hospital London, a member of the General Nursing Council and a Vice President of the Royal College of Nursing.

== Early life and nurse training ==
Helen Dey was born on 17 Apr 1888, to Robert Alexander Dey and Amelia Dey, her father was a confectioner-merchant. She was baptised at St George, Hanover Square.

Dey trained as a nurse at St Bartholomew's Hospital from 1909 to 1912 under Annie McIntosh. Her first role upon qualifying was as a Sister at the Elizabeth Garrett Anderson and Obstetric Hospital in London, where she passed the Central Midwives Board (CMB) certificate.

== First World War ==
Upon the outbreak of the First World War, she served in France with the Queen Alexandra's Imperial Military Nursing Service (QAIMNS) from 1914 to 1919. She was mentioned in despatches and awarded the Royal Red Cross. After the war she remained with the army nursing service until 1921. In Oct 1921 she registered with the General Nursing Council.

== Career ==
Dey went to and worked in the United States of America 1921–1924, holding various administrative posts at the Receiving Hospital, Detroit. Upon her return in 1925 she became Assistant Matron at the Leeds General Infirmary.

The role she was best known for was that of Matron and Superintendent of Nursing at St Bartholomew's Hospital from 1927 until her retirement in 1949. As well as overseeing the delivery of nursing services, Dey also led the nurse training school, which reflected a lifelong interest in nurse education.

Her role as Matron at St Bartholomew's included the military appointment of being Principal Matron, 1st London General Hospital from January 1927. The hospital building in Camberwell overseen by St Bartholomew's had closed in 1919, but the responsibility for providing support to the military in the case of emergency remained. During the Second world war Dey was called upon to deliver services as the 1st London General Hospital within St Bartholomews and was the Sector Matron of her region.

== Professional activities ==
Throughout her career Dey advocated for professional nursing through a number nurses' organisations.

From 1927 to 1934 she was elected President of the St Bartholomew's League of Nurses . She was an active member of the National Council of Nurses of the United Kingdom. In 1926–1934 was elected to be a Member of their executive committee, and in December 1934 was elected vice president.

Dey was active in the Association of Hospital Matrons (AHM) and was elected their president in 1938. She represented the AHM on the Staff Side of the Nurses and Midwives Whitley Council in 1958.

Dey served on the statutory body that oversaw nursing - the General Nursing Council for England and Wales between 1933 and 1950. This included being Chair of the GNC Education and Examination Committee 1938–1950 reflecting her own interest in nurse education.

Dey also advocated for nurses through the Royal College of Nursing of which she was an active member. She was elected as a member of the Royal College of Nursing Council from 1930 to 1951. She was made Honorary Treasurer in 1952 until her retirement in 1958. In recognition of her work for the RCN she was made vice-president of the Royal College of Nursing 1960 until 1969.

She died on 5 June 1969 and a memorial service 23 July 1968 at St Bartholomew the Great.

== Honours and awards ==
In the 1918 New Year Honours Dey was awarded the Royal Red Cross (RRC) first class for her work as Acting Sister with the Queen Alexandra's Imperial Nursing Service for 'valuable services with the armies in the field'.

In the 1937 Coronation Honours she was appointed Officer of the Order of the British Empire (OBE) for her work as Principal Matron at the 1st London General Hospital, Territorial Army Nursing Service.

In the 1946 New Year Honours she was appointed Commander of the Order of the British Empire (CBE).
