= Daisy Bridges =

Daisy Caroline Bridges
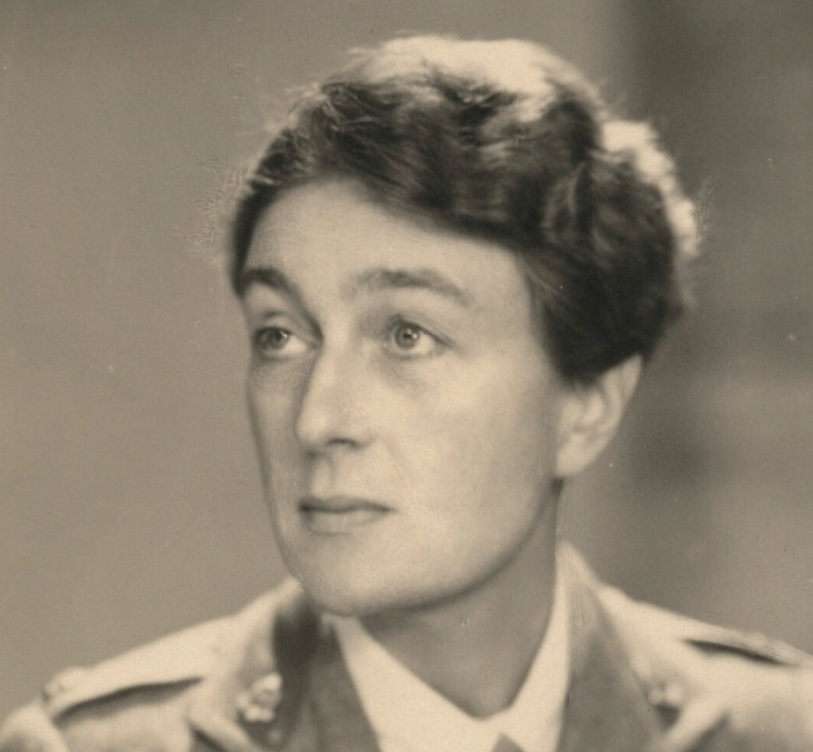
- in 1943 by Elliot and Fry (cropped)
- Born: 7 April 1894
- Died: 29 November 1972 (aged 78); St George's Hospital
- Known for: International nursing cooperation

Daisy Caroline Bridges CBE (7 April 1894 – 29 November 1972) was a nurse, midwife and British nursing administrator. In 1961 retired as the ICN's General Secretary and in 1967 she published a history of the International Council of Nurses.

== Life ==
Bridges was born in 1894. Her family lived in Surrey and she went to Cheltenham Ladies' College before she was trained as a nurse. From 1915-1919 she was a Voluntary Aid Detachment 'nurse' during the First World War and was Mentioned in dispatches.

This experience encouraged her to train as a nurse at St Thomas' Hospital 1919-1923, becoming a State registered nurse in 1925. Bridges then trained as a midwife at Radcliffe Infirmary in Oxford, qualifying as a State registered midwife in 1924. Over the next ten years she rose through the ranks until in 1936 she was a "night superintendent" when she joined a nursing administrators course at Royal Holloway which was funded by the Nightingale Fund as part of the recently formed Florence Nightingale International Foundation. She then went to Canada on a scholarship before returning to the Foundation's Resident Tutor.

During the Second World War she served with the Queen Alexandra's Imperial Military Nursing Service in Egypt, France and India and in 1943 she was awarded the Royal Red Cross for her work "in the Middle East". After the war she worked for the Ministry of Health before she became President of the National Council of Nurses Great Britain and Northern Ireland 1946-1968.

In 1953 she received the Florence Nightingale Medal and in the following year she was awarded a CBE. In 1959 she was surprised to find that the Royal Society of Health had made her a fellow. In 1961 she retired as the General Secretary of the International College of Nurses.

In 1967 she published A history of the International Council of Nurses 1899-1964 : the first 65 years which she had compiled during her retirement.

Bridges died in St George's Hospital in London leaving instructions that there was to be no mourning or flowers.
