= British Hospitals Association =

Historic medical organisation in the UK

The British Hospitals Association was established by Henry Burdett in 1884. Its journal was The Hospital, which later became The Hospital and Health Review.

In 1887 the BHA established a register of trained nurses for those who could show that they had worked for at least a year in a hospital or an infirmary and had been trained in the duties of a nurse. It ran a Nurses Co-operative in the early years of the twentieth century, which employed 500 nurses and had a turnover of £50,000 a year.

Sir Arthur Stanley became chairman in 1924.

Bernard Docker was the chairman in 1941 and represented them on the Nurses Salaries Committee chaired by Lord Rushcliffe which published two reports in 1943. There were five other British Hospitals Association representatives on the Committee: Muriel M Edwards, S Clayton Fryers of Leeds General Infirmary, Gilbert G Panter, J P Wetenhall, and S P Richardson (who was replaced by L Farrer Brown).

The Association was involved in discussions about the organisation of the future National Health Service, particularly about the regional hospital boards. It supported the objective of a free comprehensive health service, but warned that transfer of ownership of hospitals would lead to autocratic bodies taking the place of locally elected committees.
