= Henry Burdett =

English financier and philanthropist (1847–1920)

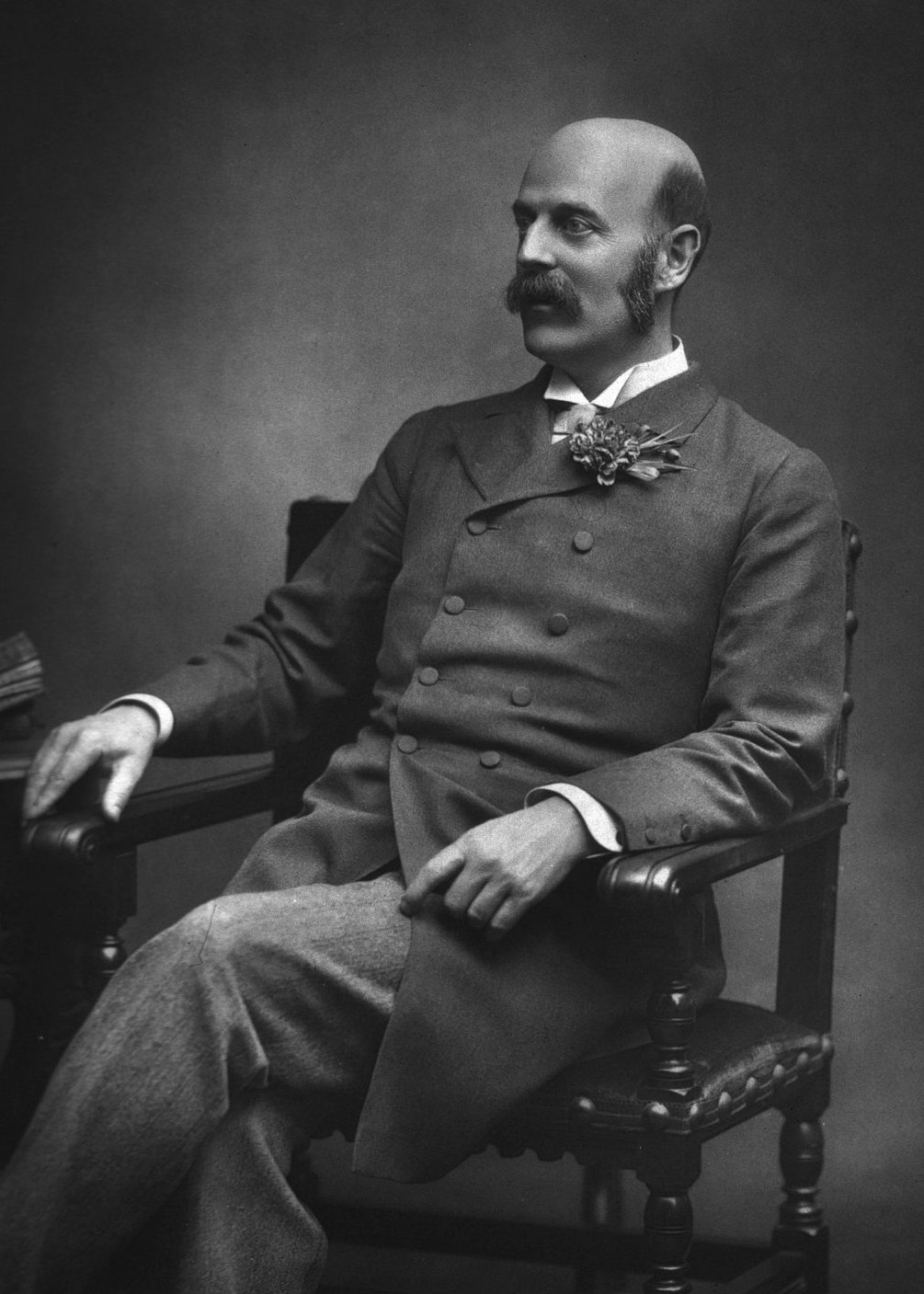
Henry Burdett

Sir Henry Charles Burdett KCB (18 March 1847 – 29 April 1920) was an English financier and philanthropist. Finance and hospitals, especially in connection with nursing, were the two main interests of his life.

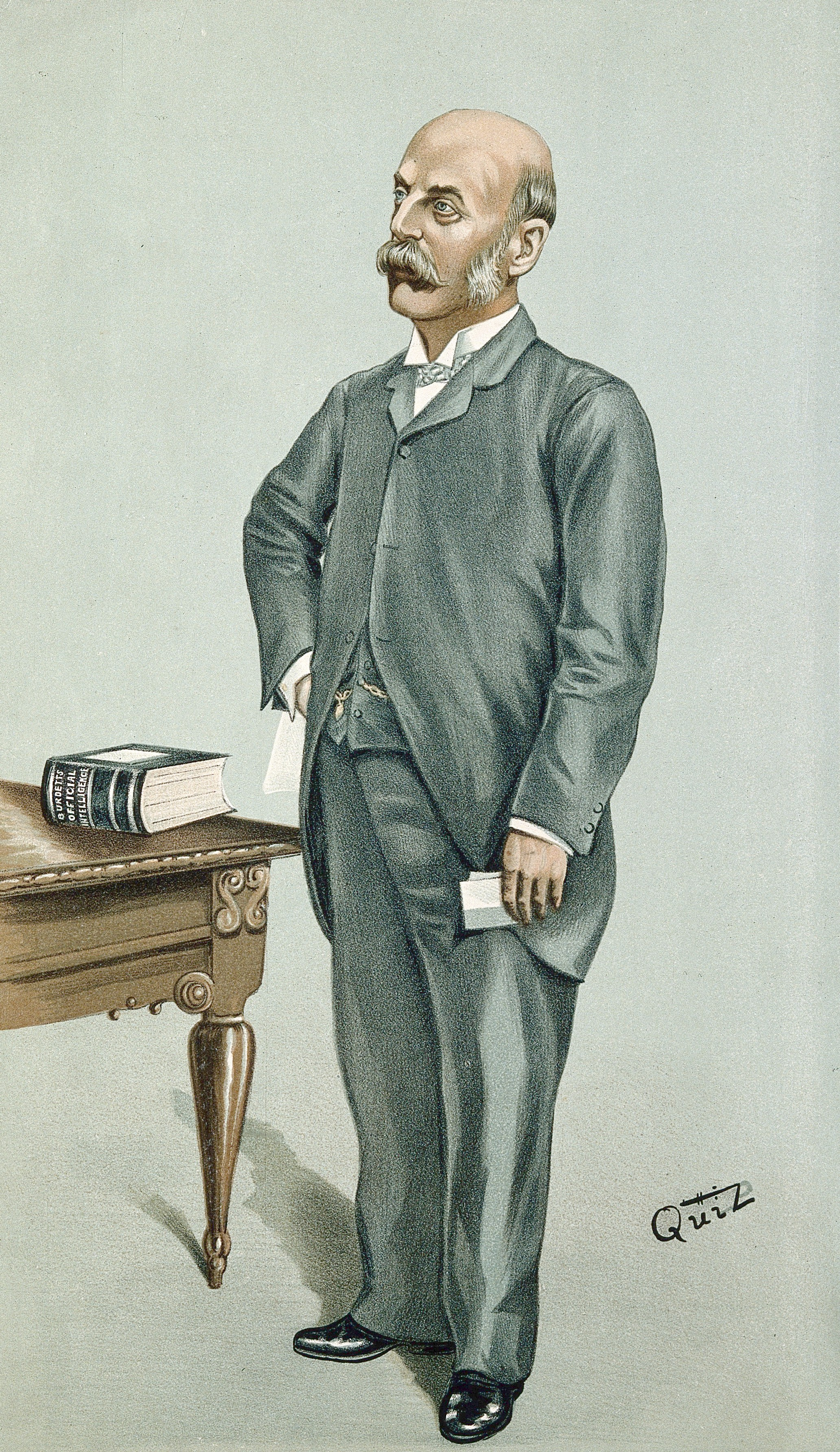
Burdett caricatured by QUIZ for Vanity Fair, 1898

== Biography ==
He was born at Broughton, Northamptonshire, the son of the Reverend Halford Burdett, a Leicestershire clergyman, and his wife Alsina.

=== Work in finance ===
In 1863, Burdett started his business career as a bank clerk in Birmingham and was soon in charge of the local clearing at the Bank of England, where his business abilities became evident.

In 1880 he became secretary to the share and loan department of the London Stock Exchange.

An important enlargement of the Stock Exchange was opened in January 1885, the addition being made of what is still called the New House. Three years before, in 1882, Burdett's Official Intelligence of Securities, the Stock Exchange encyclopaedia, had appeared for the first time. It had a precursor in The Railway Intelligence, and in 1899 its title was altered to The Stock Exchange Official Intelligence, the alteration not being without significance.

=== Medical philanthropy ===
In 1868 Burdett became secretary and general superintendent of the Queen's Hospital, Birmingham. In 1873 he enrolled there as a medical student, transferring later to Guy's Hospital, London. Later, between 1874 and 1880 he was secretary to the Dreadnought Seaman's Hospital. In 1880 Burdett became a member of the committee of management of the Seamen's Hospital Society.

He helped to establish the British Hospitals Association in 1884.

Burdett's Hospitals and Charities appeared annually from 1889 and continued until the 1990s as the Health Services Year Book.

=== Recognition and legacy ===
Burdett was made K.C.B. in the 1897 Diamond Jubilee Honours.

He retired from the Stock Exchange in 1898. He died in London.

== Publications ==
- Hospitals and Asylums of the World (4 vols. with plates, London, 1892)
- Burdett's Hospitals and Charities (year book of philanthropy)
- The Stock Exchange

Burdett owned the Scientific Press and was founder and editor of the journal The Hospital.
