= Florence Udell =

British nurse

Florence Udell CBE
- Born: 1900
- Died: 1977 (aged 76–77)
- Occupation: nurse

Florence Nellie Udell, (1900-1977) CBE, RGN, SRN, FRSH, FSCM was a British nurse, nursing administrator and government official. She was President of the Royal College of Nursing from 1964-1966.

== Early life ==
Udell was born on 11 November 1899 in Selly Oak to Henry and Mary Udell. By 1911 her parents were the Master and Matron of the Workhouse in Sudbury, Suffolk which in 1911 had 172 residents and staff - the workhouse included a sizable infirmary. Florence lived onsite at the workhouse with them.

== Education and training ==
Udell trained as a Fever Nurse at the North Western Fever Hospital London 1919-1922, registering in 1924. She then trained as a 'General Nurse' at the Radcliffe Infirmary 1922-1925, registering in 1925. Udell qualified and registered as a midwife in 1925.

== Career ==
Florence Udell served as Secretary to the RCN's organisation in Scotland in 1931. In 1944 Udell was appointed Chief Nurse in the Health Division of the European Regional Officer of the United Nations Relief and Rehabilitation Administration (UNRRA). She would later go on to serve as Colonial Office Chief Nursing Officer (COCNO) and as Nursing Adviser at the Ministry of Overseas Development.

The World Health Organization received advice on nursing from a number of bodies, particularly its Expert Nursing Committees. The first, in 1950, had both Udell, and another nurse, Olive Baggallay, as members, and made a series of statements, which were to be echoed, in one form or another, over several decades.

Nurses are needed in greater numbers than other categories of health workers because they have direct, individualized, and lasting contact with people, sick and well. In this sense, nurses are the final agents of health services ... the stage of development of nursing varies greatly from culture to culture...

== Awards ==
Udell was awarded an MBE (1941), OBE (1951) and a CBE (1958).

== RCN Presidency ==
Udell served as President of the RCN from 1964 to 1966 as principal nurse in charge of the British section of the United Nations Rehabilitation and Relief Administration (UNRRA).
