= Homerton Healthcare NHS Foundation Trust =

NHS hospital trust

- Type: NHS foundation trust
- Established: 24 December 1994
- Headquarters: Homerton, London, England
- Hospitals: Homerton University Hospital
- Staff: 4,177 (2019/20)
- Website: www.homerton.nhs.uk

Homerton Healthcare NHS Foundation Trust is an NHS foundation trust based in London, England, which runs Homerton University Hospital.

== History ==
The trust was established as Homerton Hospital NHS Trust on 24 December 1994, and became operational on 1 April 1995. It took over some of the services previously provided by the East London and The City Health Authority. It became a foundation trust on 1 April 2004, and was one of the first foundation trusts to be established.

It was named by the Health Service Journal as one of the top hundred NHS trusts to work for in 2015. At that time it had 3330 full-time equivalent staff and a sickness absence rate of 3.09%. 78% of staff recommend it as a place for treatment and 75% recommended it as a place to work.

== Services ==
The trust provides the majority of its services from a single site, Homerton University Hospital, in Homerton in the London Borough of Hackney. It also provides community health services from a number of sites across Hackney and the City of London, and healthcare services at the Mary Seacole Nursing Home in Hoxton.

When the trust proposed in 2020 to extend its soft facilities management contract with ISS Mediclean until 2025 170 of the trust's 464 doctors complained to the chief executive that their colleagues in cleaning, portering, catering and security services received worse pay and worse terms and conditions than NHS employees, including only statutory sick pay.

== Performance ==
The Commission inspected maternity services at the hospital in March 2015 and said they were "inadequate" for safety and "requires improvement" overall. None of the midwives they spoke to were aware of the deaths.

In April 2014 and again in February 2016 the CQC rated the A&E department as 'outstanding', the first emergency department to receive this rating.

It spent 8.9% of its total turnover on agency staff in 2014/5.

== See also ==
- Healthcare in London
- List of NHS trusts
