= Nurses Act 1957 =

Act of the Parliament of the United Kingdom

Nurses Act 1957 (Note: Section 35(1).)
- Act of Parliament
- Parliament of the United Kingdom
- Long title: An Act to consolidate certain enactments relating to nurses and assistant nurses for the sick.
- Citation: 5 & 6 Eliz. 2. c. 15
- Territorial extent: England and Wales (Note: Section 35(2).)

Dates
- Royal assent: 21 March 1957
- Commencement: 21 April 1957 (Note: Section 35(3).)
- Repealed: 1 July 1983
Other legislation
Amends	See § Repealed enactments
Repeals/revokes	See § Repealed enactments
Amended by	Statute Law (Repeals) Act 1974
Repealed by	Nurses, Midwives and Health Visitors Act 1979
Relates to	Nurses (Scotland) Act 1951; Nurses Agencies Act 1957

Status: Repealed

Text of statute as originally enacted

The Nurses Act 1957 (5 & 6 Eliz. 2. c. 15) was an act of the Parliament of the United Kingdom that consolidated enactments related to nurses and assistant nurses for the sick in England and Wales.

The Nurses (Scotland) Act 1951 (14 & 15 Geo. 6. c. 55) made similar provisions for Scotland.

== Provisions ==
=== Repealed enactments ===
Section 34(1) of the act repealed 3 enactments, listed in the fifth schedule to the act.

Citation	Short title	Extent of repeal
9 & 10 Geo. 5. c. 94	Nurses Registration Act 1919	The whole act.
6 & 7 Geo. 6. c. 17	Nurses Act 1943	Sections one to six. Sections fourteen and fifteen. In section sixteen, subsection (1) and, except so far as it relates to Part II of that Act, subsection (2). Sections seventeen and eighteen. Section twenty, except so far as it relates to Part II of that Act. In section twenty-one, in subsection (1), the words from "and this Act" to the end. The Schedules.
12 & 13 Geo. 6. c. 73	Nurses Act 1949	The whole act.

== Subsequent developments ==
Section 34(1) of, and schedule 5 to, the act were repealed by section 1 of, and part XI of the schedule to, the Statute Law (Repeals) Act 1974, which came into force on 27 June 1974.

The whole act was repealed by section 23(5) of, and the eighth schedule to, the Nurses, Midwives and Health Visitors Act 1979 (1979 c. 36), which came into operation on 1 July 1983.
