= Nurses Registration Act 1919 =

Act of the Parliament of the United Kingdom

Nurses Registration Act 1919 (Note: Section 9(2).)
- Act of Parliament
- Parliament of the United Kingdom
- Long title: An Act to provide for the Registration of Nurses for the Sick.
- Citation: 9 & 10 Geo. 5. c. 94
- Territorial extent: England and Wales (Note: Section 9(1).)

Dates
- Royal assent: 23 December 1919
- Commencement: 23 December 1919 (Note: The Acts of Parliament (Commencement) Act 1793.)
- Repealed: 21 April 1957
Other legislation
Amended by	Nurses Act 1943; Nurses Act 1949
Repealed by	Nurses Act 1957
Relates to	Nurses Registration (Scotland) Act 1919; Nurses Registration (Ireland) Act 1919

Status: Repealed

Text of statute as originally enacted

The Nurses Registration Act 1919 (9 & 10 Geo. 5. c. 94) was an act of the Parliament of the United Kingdom.

The act was the culmination of a long campaign led by Ethel Gordon Fenwick to establish a register of nurses.

The Minister for Health, Christopher Addison successfully introduced the act, establishing for the first time a register of nurses under the auspices of the General Nursing Council.

There was a general register for all those trained in general nursing, and supplementary registers for mental nursing, mental deficiency nursing, fever nursing, paediatric nursing, and for male nurses There was no mechanism for a nurse to transfer from one part of the register to another without re-qualifying.

Nurses were to be admitted to the register if they had, for three years before 1 November 1919, been bona fide engaged in practice and had adequate knowledge and experience of the nursing of the sick.

== Subsequent developments ==
The whole act was repealed by section 34(1) of, and the fifth schedule to, the Nurses Act 1957 (5 & 6 Eliz. 2. c. 15), which came into force on 21 April 1957.

== See also ==
- Nurses Registration Act 1901 (New Zealand)
- Nurses, Midwives and Health Visitors Act 1979
