= National Association of Workhouse Masters and Matrons =

The National Association of Workhouse Masters and Matrons was an organisation for the senior staff of workhouses and workhouse infirmaries established in 1897.

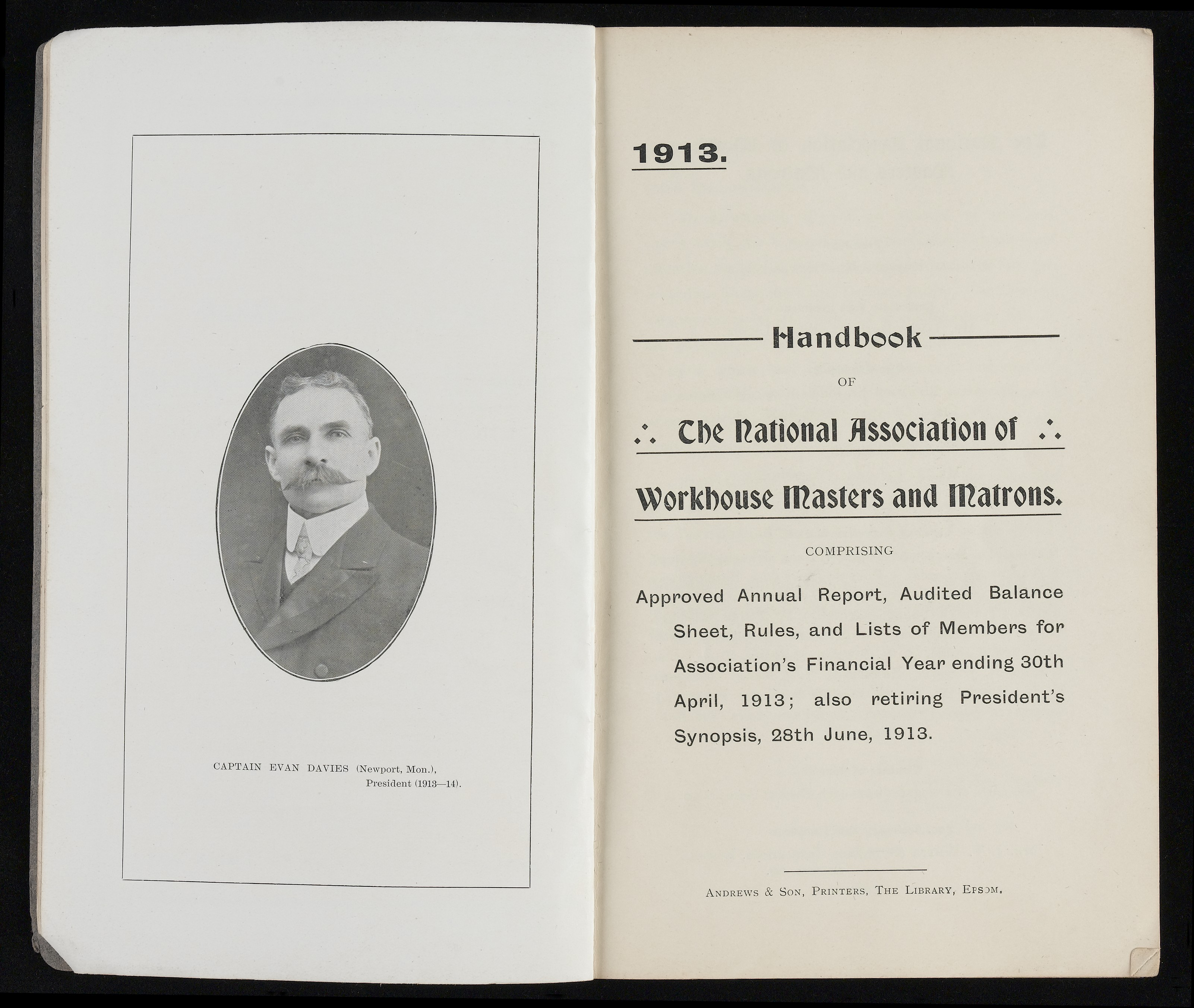
Nat. Ass. of Workhouse Masters and Matrons, handbook Wellcome L0041591

Around 1915 it was renamed the National Association of Masters and Matrons of Poor Law Institutions.

It eventually became the Association of Health and Residential Care Officers and ceased to exist in 1984.
