= Isla Stewart =

English hospital matron

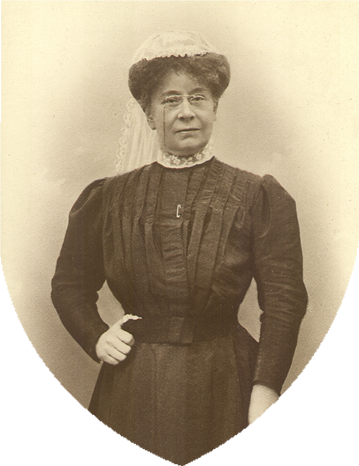
- Isla Stewart in St Bartholomew's Hospital
- Born: 25 August 1856; Slodahill, Dumfriesshire
- Died: 6 March 1910 (aged 53); Chilworth, Surrey

Isla Stewart (25 August 1856 – 6 March 1910) was an English hospital matron of St Bartholomew's Hospital in London and a founding member of the Royal British Nurses' Association.

== Early life ==
Stewart was born at Slodahill, near Lockerbie, Dumfriesshire, Scotland, to soldier and journalist John Stewart, and his wife Jessie Murray. All of Stewart's siblings were sent to boarding school, but she stayed at home to study under a governess. Later in life she showed regret for missing the opportunity to study abroad like her sisters.

== Career ==
Stewart began working at St Thomas' Hospital in London, England at the age of 23, as a special probationer in the Nightingale Training School for Nurses. After working in the Training School for nine months, she rose to become a sister of the surgical ward with 20 beds, Alexandra Ward. The Nightingale training had emphasized the ideas of practical nursing experience over theoretical instructions, and possibly most importantly to Stewart, the moral values that all nurses have to possess to be successful and effective.

Stewart left St Thomas' in 1885 when she was chosen to become matron at a smallpox hospital in Darenth, near Kent, England. Despite her organization and hard work to keep the camp running, it was shut down in 1886.

In the summer of 1887, Stewart became the matron of St Bartholomew's Hospital in London. She brought more order and education to the nursing program than the past administration, and enacted a set of skills the nurses had to learn and perfect or they would be dismissed from the program. She created a four year training system for nurses-to-be. After the first year they were required to take an exam on all of the information they had learned, and if they passed if they could become probationers. During the second and third year they received lectures on information relevant to nursing, and in the third year they were examined. After the third year they received a certificate, but could not practice until after the fourth year.

Stewart published Practical Nursing with Dr Herbert. E. Cuff in 1899, in an attempt to describe how nurses should work, with reasoning for the treatments carried out. The most emphasized point was the idea that training should be required and that hospitals could create their own training programs and hire nurses straight after. Another volume was published in 1903, and then the second edition was published in 1909. After Stewart's death in 1910, the assistant matron of St Bartholomew's Beatrice Cutler assisted Cuff in a new edition, whilst after Cuff died in 1921 Blackwood & Sons published further editions - the tenth being published in 1936.

== Death ==
Stewart's health began to deteriorate in the latter portion of 1909. She was last seen in public in the early winter of 1910 at a conference to discuss a Bill. Despite her ill health, she still was a lively speaker at the conference. Stewart died on March 6, 1910, in Chilworth, Surrey in the presence of her dear friend, who was once matron of St Bartholomew's, Ethel Gordon Fenwick.

== Legacy ==
While Stewart was matron she founded the League of St Bartholomew's Hospital Nurses, the first organization of nurses in England. The league is still active to this day. Stewart also helped to found the Matrons' Council for Great Britain and Ireland, and from this body formed the International Council of Nurses, the National Council of Nurses of Great Britain and Ireland and the Society for the State Registration of Trained Nurses.

Stewart was also a member of the Nursing Board of Queen Alexandra's Imperial Military Nursing Service and an honorary member of the Irish Nurses' Association and the German Nurses' Association. During 1907, she trained many French nurses, and the government later recognized her for this with a special silver medal.

Stewart introduced a more efficient and orderly nursing program, based upon a solid education. She recognized the stigma of being a nurse, and attempted to achieve professional advancement through her reform. Effectively combining education and professional organization brought Stewart and her ideals respected around the world. Much of her educational approach in terms of nursing is still practiced, as are her methods. Stewart illustrated that her intellect and diligence was equal to those of her superiors through her continuing reputation within the medical community.
