= The British Journal of Nursing =

- Discipline: General nursing
- Language: English
- Edited by: Sophie Gardner

Publication details
- Former name: The Nursing Record
- History: 1888–1956; 1992–present
- Publisher: MA Healthcare Ltd (United Kingdom)
- Frequency: Monthly
- Open access: Partial
- Impact factor: 0.71 (2018)

Standard abbreviations
- ISO 4: Br. J. Nurs.

Indexing
- ISSN: 0966-0461 (print); 2052-2819 (web)

Links
- Journal homepage

The British Journal of Nursing is a medical journal covering nursing. In addition to academic material on nursing and hospitals, the journal provides information on people and events as well as photographs and advertisements. There have been two versions of the journal, one historic and one modern.

== History and availability ==
It was established in 1888 as The Nursing Record, obtaining its final title in 1902. The journal was discontinued in 1956.

The journal was acquired in 1893 by Bedford Fenwick and his wife, Ethel Gordon Fenwick, the founder of the Royal British Nurses' Association, who used it to support the campaign for the official registration of nurses.

All issues of the journal are available online, having been digitised in 2001 following a grant from the Wellcome Trust.

== Current version ==
There has been a new version of the title published by MA Healthcare Ltd. since at least 1992. It does not appear to be connected to the older title. The current version has an H-Index of 41, and an SJR of 0.287.

== See also ==
- List of nursing journals
