= Matrons' Council for Great Britain and Ireland =

The Matrons' Council for Great Britain and Ireland was established in 1894 during the campaign for the registration of nurses and was disbanded c.1955.

Margaret Huxley (1854–1940) was a founder member. as was Isla Stewart (1856-1910). Agnes Karll (1868–1927) of Germany was named an honorary member for her role in nursing reform and advancing the nursing profession. Mary Pinsent was also a member of the council.

The council was represented on the Central Committee for the State Registration of Nurses in 1908.

The Matrons' Council regularly reported their activities in The British Journal of Nursing up to 1956, however around this time the Council disbanded
