= British College of Nurses =

1926-1956 British nursing organisation

The British College of Nurses was set up in 1926 by Ethel Bedford Fenwick in order to offer its members professional education and support of various kinds. It was to be run by nurses, for nurses, in a democratic manner. Fenwick had many supporters but the College only lasted for thirty years.

As a condition of their royal charters both Fenwick's Royal British Nurses' Association and the rival Royal College of Nursing were required to have public figures who were not nurses on their boards. Fenwick was determined that "no employers of Nurses, nor any member of an employing body", should have a seat on the British College of Nurses Council (BCN), and in setting up an organisation that was not covered by a royal charter ensured that the BCN was governed by a Council "formed of Registered Nurses only".

The BCN was an educational organisation with a postgraduate college and it offered opportunities for professional development. It awarded Fellowships (FBCN) and Diplomas in nursing.

The BCN also offered legal protection and more personal help when needed. It was well funded by an anonymous donor who had been encouraged by Fenwick's husband, Dr. Bedford Fenwick. He acted as trustee and treasurer, while Mrs. Bedford Fenwick was the president.

The aims of the College were "efficient professional and civic education, economic security, legal protection, social and benevolent help". Ethel Bedford Fenwick died in 1947 and the BCN closed in 1956.

== Fellows of the British College of Nurses ==
1. Ethel Bedford Fenwick
2. Margaret Huxley
3. Susan Villiers
