= Ethel Gordon Fenwick =

British nurse

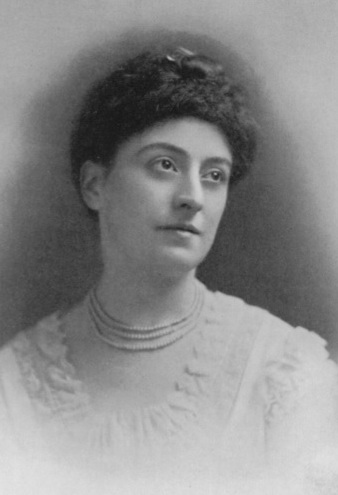
- Born: Ethel Gordon Manson; 26 January 1857; Elgin, Moray, Scotland
- Died: 13 March 1947 (aged 90); London Colney, England
- Occupation: Nurse
- Known for: President of the International Council of Nurses

Signature
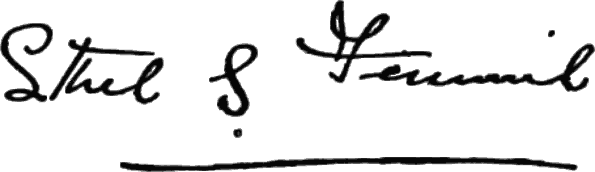

Ethel Gordon Fenwick (née Manson; 26 January 1857 – 13 March 1947) was a British nurse who played a major role in the history of nursing in the United Kingdom. She campaigned to procure a nationally recognised certificate for nursing, to safeguard the title "nurse", and lobbied Parliament to pass a law to control nursing and limit it to "registered" nurses only.

== Biography ==
She was born Ethel Gordon Manson in Spynie, near the Moray town of Elgin in Scotland, the daughter of a wealthy farmer and doctor who died later the same year. Her mother then married George Storer, a member of Parliament. She was educated privately at Middlethorpe Hall, Middlethorpe, Yorkshire. At the age of 21 she commenced nurse training at the Children's Hospital in Nottingham as a paying probationer nurse, and then at Manchester Royal Infirmary. Her expertise was soon noted and it was not long before she left for London, where she worked at a hospital in Richmond. Fenwick was a ward sister at The London Hospital in Whitechapel between 1879 and 1881, and for the last six months worked under Eva Luckes, the new matron.

In 1881, at the age of 24, she was appointed matron of St Bartholomew's Hospital, a post she held until 1887 when she resigned her post to marry Dr Bedford Fenwick, becoming known professionally as Mrs Bedford Fenwick. Her successor was Isla Stewart, with whom she became close friends and an ally in the campaign for nursing registration.

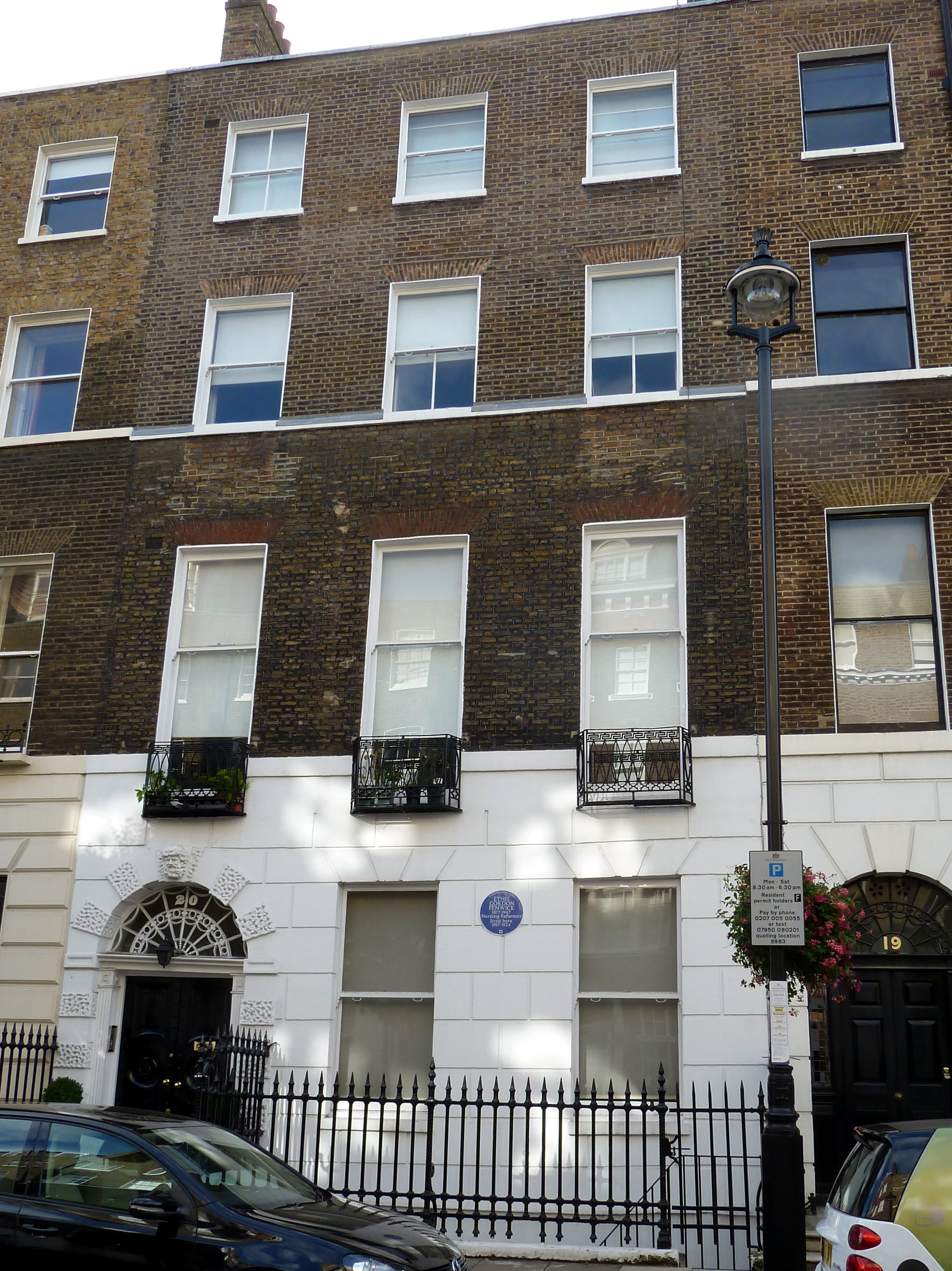
Former residence of Ethel Gordon Fenwick with blue plaque

She was the founder of the Royal British Nurses' Association in 1887.

She was instrumental in founding Florence Nightingale International Foundation, the premier foundation of the International Council of Nurses (ICN), and was its president for the first five years. She extended significantly the training period for nurses, and campaigned for the state registration of nurses in the United Kingdom. In 1910, Fenwick managed to unite many diverse nursing groups, including the British Medical Association, the Royal British Nurses' Association, the Matrons' Council for Great Britain and Ireland, the Society for the State Registration of Trained Nurses, the Fever Nurses' Association, the Irish Nurses' Association, the Scottish Nurses Association and the Association of the promotion of the registration of nurses in Scotland to create one committee for the State Registration of Nurses, which in 1919 submitted a bill to parliament which prompted the government to present its own bill covering the registration of nurses, the Nurses Registration Act 1919, and Fenwick appears as "Nurse No. 1" when the register opened in 1923. (The Cape Colony had been the first to introduce nurse registration, in 1891.)

Fenwick acquired the Nursing Record in 1893 and became its editor in 1903. It was renamed The British Journal of Nursing and through its pages for the next 54 years her thinking and her beliefs are clearly revealed. She disagreed with Florence Nightingale and with Henry Burdett about registration of nurses. She believed that there was a need for training to a recognised standard and this meant confining entry to the profession to the daughters of the higher social classes. She opposed paying nurses in training, because it attracted the wrong sort of girl. She was very keen to see control over domiciliary nursing.

In 1927 she established the British College of Nurses with an endowment of £100,000 from a grateful patient of Dr Fenwick. She was president, and he was treasurer, for life. She was supported in this postgraduate training provider by Rebecca Strong, former matron of Glasgow Royal Infirmary.

== Death and commemorations ==
Fenwick died in London Colney, Hertfordshire on 13 March 1947. She was buried in St Helena's Church, Thoroton, Nottinghamshire, England.

A special commemorative service was held at the church on the 70th anniversary of her death in 2017, attended by Professor Anne Marie Rafferty and other members of the Royal College of Nursing.

The International Council of Nurses restored her grave and the Royal British Nursing Association donated a memorial bench prior to a commorative service which was held in 2022, following postponement due to the COVID-19 global pandemic. The service was attended by former Member of Parliament Anne Milton and Howard Catton, chief executive of the ICN.

In 1999 an English Heritage "blue plaque" was attached to her former home at 20 Upper Wimpole Street, London.

== Sources ==
- McGann, Susan. "Fenwick, Ethel Gordon (1857–1947)", Oxford Dictionary of National Biography, Oxford University Press, 2004; online edn, Jan 2010 accessed 7 Oct 2010
- "ETHEL GORDON FENWICK, S.R.N.. A SHORT OUTLINE OF HER LIFE AND WORK". The British Journal of Nursing Volume 95, Page 37 (April 1947) [pdf]
