= List of nursing organisations in the United Kingdom =

This alphabetical list focuses on nursing and midwifery organisations whose activities relate to nursing as regulated by the Nursing and Midwifery Council (NMC) in the United Kingdom. It covers specialist associations, charities, professional organisations, regulators and support groups. At the end there is a list of historic nursing organisations. This list is based on the British Library UK Web Archive Nursing Collection, created in collaboration with the Royal College of Nursing History of Nursing Forum.

This list does not include any of the 80+ providers of nursing education courses, these can be searched via UCAS. Neither does it include NHS nursing departments or directorates.

Dental nurses, nursery nurses and veterinary nurses are not regulated by the Nursing and Midwifery Council and are therefore not included in this list.

== A-E ==
- Alliance of Senior Kerala Nurses (ASKeN) (c.2015-)
- Anaemia Nurse Specialist Association (ANSA)
- Association of British Paediatric Nurses (ABPN) (1938-)
- Association Of Catholic Nurses England and Wales formerly Catholic Nurses Guild (1897-)
- Association of Chief Children’s Nurses (ACCN) (c.1991-)
- Association of District Nurse and Community Nurse Educators (ADNE)
- Association of Genetic Nurses and Counsellors (AGNC)
- Association of Nephrology Nurses (UK) (ANN-UK) (2018-)
- Association of Radical Midwives (ARM) (1976-)
- Association of Respiratory Nurse Specialists (ARNS) (1997-)
- Association of South Asian Midwives (ASAM) (2019-)
- Association Of South African Nurses In The United Kingdom (ASANUK)
- Association of Spanish Nurses and Healthcare Workers Isabel Zenda (ASNH Isabel Zendal)(2021-)
- Association of Zambian Nurses in the United Kingdom (AZNUK) (2015-)
- BACCN British Association of Critical Care Nurses (BACCN)(1985-)
- British Adult Congenital Cardiac Nurse Association (BACCNA)(2007-)
- British Arab Nursing and Midwifery Association UK (BANMA)(2023-)
- British Association for Nursing in Cardiovascular Care (BANCC)(1999-)
- British Association of Critical Care Nurses (BACCN) (1985-)
- British Association of Neuroscience Nurses (BANN) (1971-)
- British Association of Urological Nurses (BAUN) (1992-)
- British Dermatological Nursing Group (BDNG) (1989-)
- British Indian Nurses Association (BINA UK) (2020-)
- British Liver Nurses' Association (BLNA) (2017-)
- British Sikh Nurses (2016-)
- Burdett Trust for Nursing (BTFN) (2002-)
- Cameroon Nurses And Midwives Association UK (2005-)
- Caribbean Nurses and Midwives Association (UK) (CNMA) (2021-)
- Cavell Nurses' Trust (1917-) formerly known as NurseAid
- Christian Science Nursing Association (UK) (CSNA(UK))
- College of Nursing see Royal College of Nursing
- Commonwealth Nurses and Midwives Federation (CNMF) (1973-)
- Congenital Cardiac Nurses Association (CCNA) (previously called Paediatric Cardiac Nurses Association (PCNA)) (1991-)
- Critical Care National Network Nurse Leads Forum (CC3N)(2003-)
- Equality 4 Black Nurses (2020-)

== F-L ==
- Filipino Nurses Association UK (FANUK)(2020-)
- Filipino UK Nurses Community (2020-)
- First Aid Nursing Yeomanry (FANY) (1907-)
- Florence Nightingale Fellowship (FNF) (1928-)
- Florence Nightingale Foundation (1934-)
- Florence Nightingale Museum (c.1982-)
- Foundation of European Nurses in Diabetes (FEND) (1995-) (registered in the UK)
- Foundation of Nursing Studies (FoNS) (c.2011-)
- Ghana Nurses Association in UK (GNA) (1993-)
- Hellenic British Midwives Association (HBMA) (2015-)
- Hong Kong Nursing Association UK (HKNAUK) (c.2021-)
- Independent Federation of Nursing in Scotland (IFON-S) (1995-)
- Independent Midwives UK (IMUK) (1985 -)
- International Family Nursing Association (IFNA) UK and Ireland Chapter (2017-)
- International Ophthalmic Nurses Association (IONA)(c.2018-) primarily active in the UK
- International Network of Spinal Cord Injury Nurses [founded and run by UK nurses]
- Ivorian Association for Health Promotion (IAHPUK) (c.2025-)
- Kenyan Nurses And Midwives Association UK (KENMA UK)(2021-)
- King's College Hospital Nurses' League (1924-)
- London Network of Nurses and Midwives Homelessness Group (LNNM) (1996-)
- Lung Cancer Nursing UK (LCNUK formerly NLCFN) (1999-)

== M-S ==
- Malawian-UK Nurses Association for Advancement (MUNAA)(c.2020-)
- Marie Curie (charity) aka Marie Curie Hospice primarily associated with nursing (1948-)
- Mary Seacole Trust, The (2004-)
- Mauritian Nurses & Health Care Professionals UK (c.2021-)
- Mental Health Nurses Academics UK (MHNAUK) (2003-)
- National HIV Nurses Association (NHIVNA) (1998-)
- National Major Trauma Nursing Group (c.2016)
- National Network of Learning Disability Nursing (NNLDN) aka National Learning Disability Nurses’ Forum (NLDNF) (c.1990-)
- Neonatal Nurses Association (NNA)(1997-)
- Nepalese Nursing Association UK (NNAUK) (2008-)
- NeuroDiverse Nurses in the UK (2020-)
- Nigerian Nurses Charitable Association UK (NNCAUK) (1998-)
- Norfolk and Norwich Old Nurses' League (1930-)
- Nurses Association of Jamaica (UK)(NAJUK)
- Nurses United (c.2019-)
- Nursing and Midwifery Council (2002-)
- Pakistani Nurses and Midwives Association (PNMA-UK) (c.2023-)
- Parish Nursing Ministries UK (2005-)
- Philippine Nurses Association of United Kingdom | Filipino Nurses in the UK (FNA-UK) (2020-)
- Paediatric Critical Care Society (PCCS) Nurse Managers group (c.2016-)
- Princess Mary's Royal Air Force Nursing Service (PMRAFNS) (1921-)
- Princess Mary's Royal Air Force Nursing Service Association (PMRAFNSA) (1992-)
- Queen Alexandra's Royal Naval Nursing Service (QARNNS) (1884-)
- Queen Alexandra’s Royal Naval Nursing Service Association (QARNNSA)(1970-)
- Queen's Institute of Community Nursing (QICN) (1887-)
- Queen's Nursing Institute Scotland (QNIS) (1889-)
- Rare Disease Nurse Network (UK)(c.2018-)
- Retired Caribbean Nurses Association (2014-)
- Romanian Nurses Association (c.2022-)
- Royal College of Nursing (RCN) (1916-)
- RCN Foundation (RCNF) (2010-)
- Royal London Hospital League of Nurses (RLHLN) (1931-)
- School and Public Health Nurses Association (SAPHNA) (2006-)
- Society of African Caribbean Midwives (SoAC Midwives) (c.2022-)

== T-Z ==
- Tibetan Nurses Group UK
- Uganda Nurses and Midwives Association UK (UNMA-UK) (2020-)
- Union of UK Malayalee Associations (UUKMA) Nurses Forum (2009-)
- United Kingdom Association for the History of Nursing (UKAHN) (c.2000-)
- United Kingdom Association of Forensic Nurses & Paramedics (UKAFN) (2004-)
- United Kingdom Critical Care Nursing Alliance (UKCCNA) (2013-)
- United Kingdom Oncology Nursing Society (UKONS) (2005-)
- WeCommunity (aka We Nurses) (2012-)
- Windrush Nurses and Beyond Foundation (2011-)
- Worshipful Company of Nurses, The (2016-)
- Zimbabwean Midwifery & Nurses Association (ZiMNA-UK) (c.2021-)

== Historic nursing organisations ==
- Association of Hospital Matrons (1919-1985)
- Association of Nurse Administrators (formerly called the Association of Hospital Matrons, name changed 1972)
- British College of Nurses (1926-1956)
- Colonial Nursing Association (CNA) (1895-1966), by 1940 Overseas Nursing Association (ONA), 1954 Queen Elizabeth Overseas Nursing Service (QEONS)
- Colonial Nursing Service (CNS) (1940-1966)
- Community and District Nursing Association (CDNA) trade union, (1939-2010)
- Community of St. John the Divine (CSJD) (1848-), registered nursing activity ceased c.1978
- Cowdray Club (1922-1974)
- Fever Nurses Association (1908-1933)
- General Nursing Council (GNC) (1919-1983)
- Guild of St Barnabas an association for Anglican nurses (1876-2012)
- Genito-urinary Nurses Association (GUNA) (1991-c.2014)
- Inter-Hospital Nurses’ Christian Fellowship (IHNCF)(1942-c.1967) (previously the Nurses’ Christian Alliance, part of the YWCA) In 1942 became an independent organisation as IHNCF.
- Institution of Nursing Sisters (founded as the Protestant Sisters of Charity by Elizabeth Fry) (1840-1939)
- Lady Minto's Indian Nursing Association (1906-c.1947) [based in London]
- League of Royal Free Hospital Nurses (c.1910-2021)
- Leeds Infirmary Nurses' League (1925-)
- London Association of Mental Health Nursing Practice (LAMP) (2013-c.2019)
- Matrons' Council for Great Britain and Ireland (1894 -c.1955)
- Midwives Ethiopia (c.2012-c.2019)
- National Association of Chief Male Nurses (1953-1968)
- National Association of Masters and Matrons of Poor Law Institutions (formed 1915- renamed as Association of Health and Residential Care Officers ceased 1984)
- National Association of Workhouse Masters and Matrons (1897-1915, renamed)
- National Council of Nurses (1908-1963)
- National Nurses Association (1937-?)
- Professional Union of Trained Nurses (PUTN)(1919-c.1931)
- Queen Alexandra's Royal Army Nursing Corps (QARANC) (1881-2024)
- Radical Nurses Group (RNG)(1980-1989)
- Ranyard Nurses (1868-c.1969)
- Royal British Nurses' Association (RBNA) (1887- 2020)
- Society of Registered Male Nurses (1937-c.1966)
- Society for the State Registration of Nurses
- Spiral Health CIC (2012-2019)
- United Kingdom Central Council for Nursing, Midwifery and Health Visiting (UKCC) (1983-2002)
- Voluntary Aid Detachment (VADs) (1909-1918)(1939-1945)
- Workhouse Infirmary Nursing Association (1879-fl.1903)

== See also ==
- Nursing in the United Kingdom
- History of nursing in the United Kingdom
