= Judge Report =

1985 report on nurse education in the UK

The Judge Report (1985) or the Report of a Commission on Nursing Education was the report of a committee established by the Royal College of Nursing to consider a different approach for nursing education in the United Kingdom.

== Context ==
In 1979, the Nurses, Midwives and Health Visitors Act was enacted to reorganise training for the professions. The United Kingdom Central Council for Nursing, Midwifery and Health Visiting (UKCC) had created working groups but not yet taken policy decisions.

The attrition rate for student nurses at this time was high, with up to 20% failing to complete training and then another 30% failing to qualify.

== Committee and research ==
The committee commissioned research on nursing manpower, which was done by researchers at the University of Sussex, and on cost implications, which was done by researchers at the University of York Department of Health Economics. It was chaired by Harry Judge.

== Report ==
The report, published in 1985, recommended policy changes including:

- Trainee nurses should no longer be employees of the National Health Service but should be students funded by bursaries.
- There should be one basic nurse qualification that enables a person to become a registered nurse.
- Curriculums for trainee nurses should enable them to go into both hospital and community nursing and make it possible to go directly into health visiting and midwifery.

It proposed a three-year course with a foundation year, placements in the community, adult nursing and mental health, and then a final year when candidates could take specialised modules.

== Impact ==
In 1986, the UKCC began Project 2000 to reform nursing education, which took from some of the recommendations of the Judge Report.

== See also ==
- Project 2000
- Briggs Report
- Salmon Report
- Platt Report
