= Rhiannon Davies and Richard Stanton =

Rhiannon Louise Davies MBE and Richard Anthony Stanton MBE are married British activists who worked to establish the truth about the death of their daughter, Kate Stanton-Davies, at Shrewsbury and Telford Hospital NHS Trust in 2009. Their efforts led to the establishment of the Ockenden Review of maternity services, led by Donna Ockenden. Further, their campaigning led to West Mercia Police instigating Operation Lincoln into both individual and corporate gross negligence manslaughter at Shrewsbury and Telford Hospital NHS Trust.

== Death of Kate Stanton-Davies ==
In March 2009, Davies gave birth to a daughter, Kate Stanton-Davies, at a midwife-led maternity unit in Ludlow. In the two weeks before the birth, Davies had complained that the baby was not moving as much as previously, and had herself been hospitalised after feeling unwell. However, midwives had not carried out any risk assessment or adjusted her birth plan. Kate was born cold and floppy, with hyperthermia and anaemia. A midwife placed Kate in an unheated cot in a side room, and only called an ambulance when a health care assistant found Kate in cardiac arrest.

Kate died after being transferred to Heartlands Hospital in Birmingham. Though Kate was cremated, the Emstrey crematorium did not use settings appropriate for infants, so Davies and Stanton were told there were no ashes.

== Pursuit of the truth ==
Davies and Stanton made formal complaints to the trust, the West Midlands Ambulance Service and the Nursing and Midwifery Council. Initially refused an inquest, they managed to secure one in 2012, represented by the barrister Elizabeth Francis. The inquest jury unanimously found that Kate's delivery at a midwife-led unit contributed to her avoidable death. They then secured the Health Service Ombudsman's attention to the case after Shrewsbury and Telford Hospital NHS Trust refused to accept the findings of the inquest. The ombudsman upheld the family's complaint, concluding that Kate's death had been avoidable, and that the trust was responsible for both service failure in Kate's care and maladministration in handling the complaint. In 2015, after a Shropshire Council inquiry reported into Emstrey crematorium's treatment of infant remains, the council also issued an apology to Davies and the parents of over fifty infants. Davies criticised the report for ignoring concerns which crematorium staff had raised, and for misrepresenting the problem as an historic problem.

After the original NHS England investigation into Kate's death was found "not fit for purpose", a second one reported in February 2016. The report found a range of "system issues", with changes even made to Kate's clinical observation notes after her death. Later that year, an independent review concluded that the trust had not met its responsibility to establish the facts about why Kate's death had occurred. It concluded that the trust was "indebted" to the tenacity of Davies and Stanton, and needed to work in partnership with them "to establish a fitting acknowledgement of the contribution they have made to the safety and quality of maternity services at SaTH".

Davies and Stanton were both appointed Member of the Order of the British Empire (MBE) in the 2023 Birthday Honours for services to maternity healthcare, along with fellow campaigners Colin and Kayleigh Griffiths, whose baby daughter Pippa died under the care of Shrewsbury and Telford Hospital NHS Trust in 2016.
