= John Greene (nurse) =

Mental health nurse from County Clare, Ireland

- Born: 1916; County Clare
- Died: 1 May 1971 (aged 54–55); Cheltenham
- Organization: Royal College of Nursing
- Known for: being Chief Nursing Officer for Cornwall

John Greene OBE (8 September 1916 - 1 May 2001) was an Irish-born chief nursing officer known for his work in the field of mental health nursing and introducing community psychiatric nursing.

== Early life ==
Greene was born on 8 September 1916 in County Clare, Ireland. His mother died when he was eight years old, during the birth of her tenth child. Greene left school at 14 and worked as a labourer. In 1935, aged 18, Greene moved to England to join his brother who was already working in private nursing. Six of his nine siblings became nurses.

== Early career ==
Greene initially gained experience in private mental hospitals in Bedford and Essex prior to moving to Herrison Hospital, Dorset, to undertake formal nurse training 1937-1940. In 1939 he qualified as a mental nurse gaining the Royal Medico-Psychological Association's certificate. From 1943 he was registered on the General Nursing Council 'Mental Nurses' Register.

In 1940, Greene joined the Royal Navy as a sick-berth attendant and continued studying for his Registered Mental Nurse (RMN) qualifications and Registered Nurse (SRN) qualifications. In 1943/1944, he was deployed in duties on a hospital ship in the Indian Ocean caring for men with physical and mental trauma. He cared for ex-prisoners of war in Colombo. He rose to the rank of petty officer and was demobbed in March 1946.

== Later career ==
Following demobilisation, Greene returned to Herrison Hospital and in 1951 worked in Moorhaven Hospital, Devon, becoming Chief Male Nurse in 1953. While at Moorhaven, Greene contributed to the development of community psychiatric services, a new venture for that period. He advocated for a psychiatric service that extended into the community encompassing continued care, liaison with other community teams and support for families.

In 1964, Greene became the chief nurse for Cornwall and the Isles of Scilly, a post that entailed responsibility for both general and psychiatric services. He was appointed Chief Nursing Officer for Cornwall in 1969 and for Gloucestershire Area Health Authority in 1974. He retired in 1978 at the age of 62. He spent his last day of employment nursing elderly patients in a hospital in Gloucester, thus bringing his career full circle.

== Administrative contributions ==
Greene served as a member of the Board of Examiners for the General Nursing Council and was a member of the Southwest Area Nurse Training Committee. Between 1961 and 1963, he was a member of the influential Platt Committee on Nursing Education for the Royal College of Nursing, led by Harry Platt which published as the Platt Report 1964. In 1963, he was appointed to the Salmon Committee which reported and made recommendations on staff structures in the NHS.

During the 1960s and 1970s, Greene served on the Central Health Services Council and the Standing Nursing and Midwifery Advisory Committee as an adviser to successive governments. He served on enquiry committees into standards of care in psychiatric hospitals. In 1977, he became part of a Department of Health & Social Security working group reviewing functioning of mental illness hospitals. He promoted the interests and developments of nurse managers and administrators.

Greene was Chief of the National Association of Chief Male Nurses 1953-1968 which was previously a section of the Society of Registered Male Nurses. The Association amalgamated with the Association of Nurse Administrators.

Greene founded The Association of Chief and Principal Nursing Officers for Mental Hospitals. He negotiated amalgamation with the Association of Hospital Matrons to form the Association of Nurse Administrators, becoming the first male president of that association 1976-1979. He continued in this role after his retirement.

Greene published several articles in professional health journals. He presented lectures and seminars for the RCN and other academic institutions.

== Awards ==
In 1958 Greene was the first male nurse to win a British Commonwealth Nurses Memorial Fund Scholarship which enabled him to study psychiatric care in Scandinavia, Holland and Belgium.

In 1973 Greene was awarded the OBE for services to nursing.

In 1977 he was elected to fellowship of the Royal College of Nursing (the first mental health nurse to receive this honour).

== Personal life ==
Greene married Betty Mary Rickers, a lecturer in biology, at Chatham on 11 July 1942 and they had two sons.

Greene was an active member of the History of Nursing Society of the RCN. Green was a cofounder (with his wife) of the Tiles and Architectural Ceramics Society. He carried out a project to document, catalogue and photograph hospital tile pictures, many of which were being lost as hospitals were renovated or demolished. He was able to get an appeal for information on the location of tiles on Blue Peter, the popular children's television programme. He published his work in his book Brightening the long days: hospital tile pictures.

Greene published an account of his early life in Dominic remembers: Life in County Clare 1916 to 1935.

Greene died suddenly at his home in Cheltenham on 1 May 1971. A memorial service was held at the Friends Meeting House in Cheltenham.
