= Project 2000 =

UK nursing education scheme of the 1990s and 2000s

Project 2000 was a higher education scheme in the United Kingdom for nursing qualifications, introduced in 1990 by the United Kingdom Central Council for Nursing, Midwifery and Health Visiting (UKCC), later the Nursing and Midwifery Council (NMC). The development was led by Margaret Dorothy Green.

== History ==
The Briggs Report and then the Judge Report had provided earlier recommendations for the reform of nursing education in the UK.

=== Nursing denominations ===
SRN nurses were established by the Nurses Registration Act 1919, although only legally binding in the 1943 Act. SEN nurses were established by the 1943 Nurses' Act, but known as State Enrolled Assistant Nurses. In March 1961, through the Nurses (Amendment) Act, 1961, this became State Enrolled Nurse, by the efforts of Dame Irene Ward, the Conservative MP for Tynemouth. Training for SEN nurses began in 1945, with 1,658 completing the two-year course in 1949, and around 6,000 in 1960.

=== Earlier training ===
The National Board for Prices and Incomes around 1967 commissioned a report into nurse training, and wanted the minimum age lowered from 18 to 17, and much larger nurse training schools. The attrition rate of nurse training was 34% per year in the late 1960s. There were around 24,000 entrants to nurse training in the late 1950s, which had risen to 30,000 in the late 1960s.

The GNC test was developed by the National Institute of Industrial Psychology; it was largely an IQ test. An entrance requirement of 5 O-levels was recommended by the Platt Report 1964. For SRN training, London hospitals could ask for four O-levels and possibly an A-level. To become an SRN before January 1970, you needed 2 O-levels or 2 grade 1 CSEs, or to take the General Nursing Council Test. You had to be 17 and 9 months (in the early 1970s).

After January 1970, you needed 5 O-levels, preferably English, Maths, and a science. Nurses would spend the first 8 weeks in the Preliminary Training School at the hospital, learning basic hygiene, bedmaking, and anatomy. In the first three years, the nurse would work in all hospital departments, including surgical and medical wards, casualty, theatre, and geriatric and paediatric. Final exams were taken at the end. Few men became nurses. SEN was training for two years, in the early 1970s. 90% of the nurse entrant intake had no A-levels. In 1975, a third of nurses admitted for training were through the GNC test alone. Entrants to nurse training had dropped from 30,000 in 1981 to 25,000 in 1986.

The Princess Mary's Royal Air Force Nursing Service also trained SRN and SEN nurses, at one of 10 RAF Hospitals (in the early 1970s there were 6 in the UK, and 4 overseas), recognised bythe General Nursing Council. Part of the SRN training took place at RAF Hospital Wegberg in Germany. SEN training often took place overseas (Germany or Cyprus) in the second year. SRN nurses joining the RAF would be offered a commission.

=== Early degree courses ===
In November 1956 the RCN proposed a degree course in nursing. The University of Manchester established the UK's first university course for nurses, in 1959, with nine on the first course. It was established by Elizabeth Elaine Wilkie and Prof Fraser Brockington. The University of Edinburgh introduced the first Bachelor's degree course for Nursing in 1960. The Department of Nursing Studies at the University of Edinburgh was formed in 1965, the first in the UK, and the only one by the late 1960s. St George's Hospital ran a nursing degree course, with the new University of Surrey by 1968.

The University of Manchester upgraded a nursing diploma course into a full degree, the Bachelor of Nursing qualification, from around 1970. In 1973, at Manchester, Jean McFarlane, Baroness McFarlane of Llandaff was the first Professor of Nursing in the UK. By 1978, twelve universities had undergraduate nursing courses, with five polytechnics.

=== A move to training in higher education ===
The RCN's Commission on Nursing Education, also known as the Judge Report, was published in April 1985; it forecast difficulties in there being enough nurses trained in the UK by the 1990s. For female school leavers with qualifications between five O-levels and two A-levels, one quarter went into nurse training. The 1985 report recommended that nurse training be taken out of hospitals, and instead put into higher education; the main reason for looking at higher education was that the attrition rate for nurses in higher education was much lower. It would also allow qualified nurses to work as nurses rather than being required, additionally, to train apprentice nurses.

The UKCC's new training plans were announced on Tuesday 13 May 1986; being about the 'health needs of the year 2000'. In the 1980s, student nurses made up a quarter of nursing staff, but would end up providing three-quarters of the health care on wards. A final plan would be ready by November 1986. The new training plan would start by 1988. Training for SEN nurses would be stopped. The official new plans were first announced on Monday 23 May 1988 by the health secretary at the congress of the RCN in Sussex. Kenneth Clarke gave more details at the RCN Congress in Blackpool on Monday 3 April 1989. Health care assistants were announced on 18 January 1990, by Duncan Nichol, the NHS chief executive.

=== Plan ===
The Project 2000 scheme was created by the United Kingdom Central Council for Nursing, Midwifery and Health Visiting (UKCC), itself established in 1983, which became the Nursing and Midwifery Council (NMC) in 2002.

The UKCC introduced the document Project 2000: A New Preparation for Practice in 1986. This had been produced with boards from England, Scotland, Wales and Northern Ireland. Its recommendations were to create a three-year foundation programme of training, for branches to include midwifery, adult nursing, children's nursing and mental health nursing, for second level training to be abolished, for trainee nurses to be students with no rostered work, and for improved facilities and links with the wider higher education sector. The proposals were amended so that students would have rostered work as 20% contribution due to the cost of students and the shortage of qualified practitioners. It was estimated that £580 million would be required over 14 years for Project 2000, primarily to cover the work previously undertaken by trainee nurses.

Methods and procedures in nursing were becoming more knowledge-led. Instead of the former apprenticeship system, whereby nurses were trained at hospitals, the Project 2000 scheme was to contract the training of nurses out to British universities. State Enrolled Nurses (SENs) previously had two years of training. State Registered Nurses (SRNs) were fully qualified nurses before 1990.

=== Concurrent schemes ===
In 1990, the National Health Service and Community Care Act 1990 introduced the internal market and GP Fundholding, and replaced Family Practitioner Committees with Family Health Services Authorities, which later became Primary Care Trusts (PCTs) from 2001-2013.

== Implementation ==
Project 2000 was phased in as the primary choice for nurse training from 1990. By May 1992, £207 million had been allocated to support the introduction of Project 2000 in 64 colleges with 17 colleges continuing to use traditional training. When the scheme began, universities did not charge any tuition fees and students were paid a bursary to support their living and training costs during the course.

Under Project 2000, trainee nurses obtained a diploma and registered nurse qualification at the end of their training. State Registered Nurses became Registered General Nurses (RGNs). State Enrolled Nurses were replaced with healthcare assistants, who had no official training and were not registered. Existing SENs were to be allowed to train and "convert" to being SRNs. The curriculum of nurse training under Project 2000 was widened from a focus on treating the sick to include more study of community care, prevention of ill-health, and health education.

Project 2000 student nurses studied for 3 years, splitting the time between class-based learning and practical placements. The first 18 months of the course were known as the common foundation programme and provided basic grounding in 4 nursing disciplines: Adult, Child, Mental Health and Learning Disability care. This was followed by 18 months dedicated to the nursing discipline of choice. On successful completion of the course, students were awarded a Diploma in Nursing relevant to their discipline.

== See also ==
- Category:Acts of the Parliament of the United Kingdom concerning healthcare
- Timeline of tuition fees in the United Kingdom
- Platt Report 1964
