= Cumberlege Report 1986 =

1986 report on UK community nursing

The Cumberlege Report (1986) or Neighbourhood nursing: a focus for care was the report of a Department of Health and Social Security (DHSS) committee advocating that community nurses in the United Kingdom be permitted to prescribe from a restricted list of treatments.

== Context ==
A committee was created in 1985 by the DHSS to review the care provided by nurses and health visitors outside hospitals and report on how resources could be used more effectively. The committee focussed on primary care nursing. Welsh and Scottish reviews also took place, on different timelines.

Julia Cumberlege was appointed chair.

== Report ==
The Cumberlege Report was published in 1986. The Report stated that patient care would be improved and resources used more effectively if nurses were able to prescribe items from a limited list.

The Report also recommended that a neighbourhood nursing service be established, with eventual removal of differences between district nurses, health visitors and school nurses. It suggested a "nurse practitioner" role be created to designate more highly skilled nurses with prescribing powers and also that general practices should not be subsidised to employ practice nurses.

== Impact ==
The Cumberlege Report recommendations were included in Promoting Better Health, a 1987 white paper. A Whitley Council was told to review nurse pay.

In 1989, the Department of Health created a committee with Dr June Crown as chair, to examine nurse prescribing. It issued the Report of the advisory group on nurse prescribing (Crown Report), which recommended which items nurses might prescribe and the circumstances in which they might prescribe them. The report stated that doctors often merely signed-off nurse prescribing decisions and that 'There is wide agreement that action is now needed to align prescribing powers with professional responsibility.' The Crown Report noted that patients particularly likely to benefit from changes were those with a catheter or stoma, those with postoperative wounds, and homeless people not registered with a general practitioner.

In 1992, the Medicinal Products; Prescriptions by Nurses etc Act was enacted. A trial of community nurse prescribing took place and then the Secretary of State gave district nurses and health visitors prescribing powers from a Nuse Prescriber's Formulary in 1998. By the 2010s, there were approximately 54,000 nurse and midwife prescribers in the UK.

In 1997, Crown again headed a review into prescribing and in 1999 recommended an extension to prescribing. The Review of Prescribing, Supply and Administration of Medicines (Crown II Report) led to nurses being able to prescribe from the Formulary, plus licensed pharmacy and general sales list medicines, and some prescription-only medicines, under a "dependent prescribing" or "supplementary prescribing" framework. In 2001, supplementary prescribing was extended to pharmacists and some other health professionals. From 2006, the Extended Formulary was eliminated and those who had permission to prescribe from it were able to independently prescribe any licensed medicine except controlled drugs.

== See also ==
- Medicines Act 1968
- Briggs Report 1972
- Salmon Report 1966
- Platt Report 1964
