= Ockenden =

Ockenden may refer to:

- Ockenden International, a charity
- Ockenden, California, U.S.
- Donna Ockenden, senior British midwife and chair of the Ockenden Review
- Eddie Ockenden (born 1987), Australian hockey player
- Leon Ockenden (born 1978), English actor
- William Ockenden (died 1761), English Member of Parliament

== See also ==
- Ockendon (disambiguation)
