= Mayston Report =

1969 report on management in UK community nursing

The Mayston Report (1969) or the Report on Management Structure in the Local Authority Nursing Services was the report of a working party appointed to consider improvements to the management of United Kingdom local authority nursing services in the way that the Salmon Report had examined management of hospital nurses.

== Context ==
The working party had been set up after Salmon and due to the recommendations of the Prices and Incomes Board to ensure that the pay and hierarchy of local authority nurses be linked with those of nurses in hospital services. A nurses' pay claim was in progress when the group was established in 1968 so a report was required in autumn 1969. This reason was given for not taking evidence or conducting research beyond examining the existing structures.

== Working party ==
Mr E.L. Mayston of the Department of Health and Social Security was the chair.

== Recommendations and impact ==
The Mayston report recommended opportunities for experienced nurses to work in management, as had the Salmon Report.

11 pilot schemes were created to act as models for how to implement the structure recommended by Mayston, based on learning from the implementation of the Salmon Report recommendations. Grade titles established by these schemes were: Director of Nursing Services, Divisional Nursing Officer and Area Nursing Officer (a State registered nurse with community nursing experience and qualification in health visiting, district nursing or midwifery) and Nursing Officer (a district nurse, health visitor or district midwife).

== See also ==
- Briggs Report
- Salmon Report
- Platt Report 1964
