= Grace Margery Westbrook =

British nurse (1910–1999)

- Born: 13 July 1910. Rotherham
- Died: 30 May 1999 (aged 88); Almondsbury, Gloucestershire
- Occupations: Nurse, Matron

Grace Margery Westbrook (13 July 1910 – 30 May 1999) CBE, was the first practising nurse to be elected Chair of the Staff Side of the Nurses and Midwives Whitley Council.

== Early life and education ==
Westbrook was born on 13 July 1910 in Rotherham where her father was a pharmacist, and she worked as his assistant until she began nurse training. She trained at Sheffield Royal Infirmary (and the Maternity Hospital at Leeds) qualifying in 1935. Starting at Queen Elizabeth Hospital Birmingham in 1938 she held posts successively, as staff nurse, ward sister, night superintendent and relief administrative sister. She obtained the sister tutor's diploma before taking the nurse management course at the Royal College of Nursing.

== Career as Matron ==
She became first assistant Matron at Bristol Royal Hospital. She then took a lateral move to become sister tutor at the Royal Devon and Exeter Hospital from 1953-1955 which enabled her to look after her recently widowed mother, who lived with Westbrook in the matron's flat.

Westbrook was matron of Weston-super-Mare General Hospital until December 1958 when she was appointed Matron of Southmead Hospital, Bristol. At Southmead she was appointed a member of the South West Regional Hospital Board and was able to put forward her views on patient care.

Westbrook was an active member of the Royal College of Nursing. She was elected as Council member representing Southern England in 1959. She sat on RCN committees including the RCN Finance committee; and was Chair of the RCN Establishment and General Purposes Committee.

She represented the RCN at a number of events and committees such as the Society of Registered Male Nurses Annual Conference in 1957 and was the RCN representative, Regional Council for Further Education for the South West. This led her to sit on the RCN's committee that published the influential Platt Report 1964 on the Reform of Nursing Education.

Westbrook went on to represent the RCN as a member of the Committee that published the Salmon Report on Senior Nursing Staff Structure in 1966. One of the impacts of the Salmon Report was the abolition of the term Matron and later, her retirement made her the last matron of Southmead Hospital, Bristol.

== Administrative roles ==
In 1967 Westbrook was appointed to the newly created National Nursing Staff Committee which arose out of the Salmon Report. This government committee was to advise on management training for nurses and midwives. She was reappointed as Vice-Chair in 1969. She was Chair of the selection and appointment working party in 1968.

Westbrook was the first practising nurse to be elected Chair of the Staff Side Committee, Nurses and Midwives Whitley Council 1963-1969.

In the 1960s she regularly travelled to Geneva where she sat on the International Council of Nurses Professional Services Committee. She was also active in the Association of Hospital Matrons and sat on an expert government committee on hepatitis B infection.

Westbrook was made a Commander of the Order of the British Empire (CBE) in 1970.

She died in Almondsbury, Gloucestershire 30 May 1999.
