= Stanley Holder =

- Born: 21 September 1928
- Died: 28 August 2017 (aged 88)
- Occupation: Nurse
- Known for: Education, journalism and healthcare ethics
- Awards: FRCN
- Honours: OBE, Freeman of the City of London, Badge of Honour British Red Cross Society

Stanley John Holder OBE FRCN (1928–2017) was a nurse leader known for his work in education and journalism and healthcare ethics.

== Early life ==
Holder was born on 21 September 1928 in Poplar, London. His mother (Florence Dorothy) had nine children, of which Holder and his non-identical male twin were number seven and eight. His mother died when Holder was three. His father, George Henry, was a Cooper at Whitbread's and he died when Holder was fifteen. Holder attended grammar school having enrolled without his father knowing and undertook any jobs before and after school to help out with money. He left school before completing his school certificate but subsequently received a Diploma of Education of the University of London in 1978.

Holder was influenced by the Methodist Church and pacifist movement and at the age of 18 when he was due for military service he registered as a conscientious objector. This led to a tribunal at which Holder selected the option of hospital work as an alternative to military call up.

== Nurse training and early career ==
Between 1947 and 1950, Holder trained at the School of Nursing, Oldchurch Hospital, Romford, where he remained 1951–3 as charge nurse for acute surgery and 1953–4 as night charge nurse, the first male nurse to be appointed in his training school.

From 1954 to 1956, Holder studied for the Sister Tutor Diploma at the University of London at Battersea, returning to Oldchurch Hospital from 1956 to 1960 as tutor.

== Further career ==
Between 1960 and 1965 Holder was principal tutor at the Hackney Group of Hospitals, London. From 1964 to 1965 he attended Merton College, Oxford, for the programmed learning course.

Between 1965 and 1967 Holder switched focus to journalism, becoming assistant editor of the Nursing Times. He contributed articles which described improvements and initiatives undertaken by hospitals.

In 1967 Holder was appointed principal tutor of St Mary's Paddington, holding the post until 1970. He was the first man to hold this position in a London teaching hospital. In 1970 he was appointed principal nursing officer (education) of St Mary's Hospital Teaching Group.

In 1970 he took the senior multidisciplinary learning course at the University of Manchester and in 1973 he was awarded a Florence Nightingale Memorial Scholarship to study nurse education in the USA.

Holder was an active member of the Royal College of Nursing (RCN) from 1969 to 1972, in 1974 was the chair of the RCN Representative Body (RRB). In 1976 he became the vice-chair of RCN Council - the first man elected to honorary office with the Royal College of Nursing. In 1976 Holder was involved in discussion over the RCN Council's decision to consider trade union status. He stated due to their unique caring role a nurses' group should be a separate entity to part of a group of different workers.

While holding career educational appointments Holder was elected to board memberships of nursing regulatory bodies. He was a member of the ENB (English National Board) the regulatory body that held responsibility for post registration nursing courses. He was elected to the United Kingdom Central Council for Nursing, Midwifery and Health Visiting (UKCC) in 1983.

Holder was a strong proponent of the Project 2000 initiative started in 1986 to reform nurse training. He was involved in the earlier drafting work of Project 2000 and as director of Nurse Education for Paddington and North Kensington initiated steps towards implementing the project. In an interview for the Nursing Standard he presented arguments for a wider scope of nurse education, development of roles and skills with appropriate training courses. He proposed links with higher education and re-structuring of the nursing curriculum.

From 1987 to 1990 Holder was the director of nurse education, Parkside Health Authority.

== Other contributions to nursing and healthcare ==
Activity relating to The Catholic Nurse

Holder had converted to Catholicism in 1950. He was active in the Catholic Nurses Guild of England and Wales speaking in 1967 about The Medical Termination of Pregnancy Bill and its implications for doctors and nurses.

In 1974 Holder was one of the founder members the Linacre Centre (later renamed the Anscombe Bioethics Centre) for the study of the ethics of health care, and later served on the board of governors.

Further journalistic and publishing activity.

Holder founded and co-edited Nurse Education Today and contributed peer-reviewed articles. One notable publication was a tribute to the late Prince Philip when the Prince withdrew from public duties. Holder noted that the Prince's support was particularly appreciated by men who brought wartime field experience to the profession (Prince Philip was patron of the Society of Registered Male Nurses).

Holder served as consultant editor of the McGraw-Hill nursing series studies textbooks.

Other healthcare roles and activity.

Holder was active in the Society of Registered Male Nurses and was the only man to serve as a delegate to the National Council for Nurses. He was Vice President of the Commonwealth Nurses Federation 1976–1979. Holder held the positions of Chief Nurse Adviser to the British Red Cross Society. He held membership of Tower Hamlets Health Authority, was vice-chair of the Mildmay Mission Hospital governors and a school governor. He was chairman of the North West Thames regional nurse training committee.

== Directorships ==
1992–1993 director of the Florence Nightingale Foundation.

1993-1994 director, Mind in Tower Hamlets and Newham.

1991-1997 director, British Acupuncture Accreditation Board.

== Awards ==
1979 Fellowship of the Royal College of Nursing

1981 Officer of the Order of the British Empire (OBE)

Freeman of the City of London and Badge of Honour, British Red Cross Society.

== Retirement ==
In 1990, when he retired, Holder was interviewed for the Nursing Standard, discussing reasons for early retirement and plans for the future.

== Death ==
Holder died on 28 August 2017 in Romford.

== Tributes ==
An event at the RCN Headquarters took place in December 2018 to commemorate Holder. A plaque in his memory was unveiled by the then RCN President Cecilia Akrisie Anim.
