= Dora Opoku =

Educationist from Ghana

Dora Kwartiorkor Opoku OBE (14 April 1948 – 17 December 2010) was a Ghanaian-British midwife and educationist who was an authority in the field of medical research ethics.

== Early life ==
Opoku was born on 14 April 1948 in Accra, Ghana, one of six children. Her mother Barbara's career as a social worker influenced Opoku's lifelong commitment to justice and equality. Her father Ebeneezer was head nurse at the main Korle Bu Accra hospital and later Health Centre Superintendent in the Ashanti Region. Opoku attended Ghana's prestigious Wesley Girls boarding school.

== Career ==
In 1967, Opoku began training as a nurse in Scotland at Maryfield Hospital, Dundee, her mother having vetoed London as a destination. She was one of the few black people in the city at that time and was known affectionately as the "wee African nurse." From 1970 to 1971 she trained as a midwife at the Southern General Hospital in Glasgow.

After working as a midwife teacher in London at St Thomas' Hospital, Opoku was appointed head of midwifery education at the Royal London Hospital in 1984. Working in the ethnically diverse and socially deprived borough of Tower Hamlets, Opoku was committed to improving care provision to women with complex needs and their families, including those from minority ethnic groups with little or no English. She supported the establishment of a training programme for Bengali-speaking maternity aid workers and encouraged midwives to continue their education and undertake research into improving healthcare for women.

In 1991, Opoku gained an MA in medical ethics and law from King's College London. Four years later, she became Head of the Department of Midwifery and Child Health in what was then the St Bartholomew School of Nursing and Midwifery (later the School of Community and Health Sciences) at City, University of London, where she worked until her retirement in 2010. Under Opoku's direction, the department attracted a diverse team of lecturers and established a reputation for providing high quality education.

In 2001, Dora was seconded to work at the United Kingdom Central Council for Nursing, Midwifery and Health Visiting and helped develop its code of conduct. She became Chair of the East London and The City Research Ethics Committee, and achieved international respect for her knowledge about research governance. She sat on the Department of Health's consent advisory group and was a trustee of the British Pregnancy Advisory Service and a member of the Association of Radical Midwives. In 2004 she was appointed OBE in recognition of her services to midwifery education. She was initially sceptical about the "British Empire" connotations of the award, but a visiting relative persuaded her to accept the honour.

In 2008, she joined the board of the British Pregnancy Advisory Service. In 2010, she was made a fellow of the Royal College of Midwives, and the University of London made her its first emeritus fellow.

== Death ==
Opoku died of cancer on 17 December 2010. In 2018, The Iolanthe Midwifery Trust established the Dora Opoku Award for Black, Asian and Minority Ethnic (BAME) students and midwives.
