= Margaret Dorothy Green =

British nurse and educator

Margaret Dorothy Green OBE FRCN
- Born: 1929
- Died: 2017 (aged 87–88)
- Occupation: Nurse
- Employer(s): Royal College of Nursing and United Kingdom Central Council for Nursing, Midwifery and Health Visiting
- Known for: Project 2000

Margaret Dorothy Green OBE FRCN (1929–2017) was a senior Royal College of Nursing employee from 1966 to 1990 and was instrumental in setting up the United Kingdom Central Council for Nursing, Midwifery and Health Visiting (UKCC), the forerunner of the Nursing and Midwifery Council. Through UKCC, Green introduced major changes to nurse education such as Project 2000 and PREP.

== Early life ==
Green was born on 22 August 1929

== Education and career ==
Green qualified as a nurse in 1955 at the Kent County Ophthalmic and Aural Hospital Maidstone, the Royal London Hospital and the Kent and Canterbury Hospital, registering in July 1955.

Green first joined the Royal College of Nursing in December 1965 as a Tutor in the then Education Division where she helped to organize ward sisters' courses for UK and overseas nurses. In 1966, when the Salmon Report was published, she planned two of the first experimental first-line management courses for staff nurses and ward sisters. In June 1973 Green become Head of the Professional Nursing Department.

In 1976, she took up the post of RCN Director of Education and Principal of the Institute of Advanced Nursing Education, a post she held until her retirement in 1990.

Green was instrumental in setting up the United Kingdom Central Council for Nursing, Midwifery and Health Visiting (UKCC)^{[1]} and was Chair of the English National Board.

In 1986, Green chaired the committee which initiated a major UKCC plan to modernise nursing education by the end of the millennium, called Project 2000. This major scheme sought to expand the provision of nursing degrees in the United Kingdom to ensure that entry level nursing qualifications for registered nurses were at degree level.

Green was involved in UKCC's Post-registration Education and Practice (PREP). PREP took several years to introduce, with the final framework being agreed in 1994, and the scheme itself being introduced in 1995. PREP developed into the current scheme of Revalidation which was implemented in April 2016.

== Personal life ==
Upon her retirement Green moved to Ebford, Exeter, Devon. She became a visiting professor at Exeter University. Green was a Director of Exeter Hospiscare from 16 December 1997 until 23 September 2008. She was also governor and then chair of the board of governors at the Royal Devon and Exeter Hospital. She was also a director of the Florence Nightingale Foundation until 1992.

== Death ==
Green died on 30 March 2017. Her funeral took place on 18 April 2017, at Christ the King Church, Bagshot.

== Honours ==
Green was appointed an Officer of the Order of the British Empire (OBE) in the 1986 Birthday Honours List.

A devout Roman Catholic, she was made a Dame of St Gregory (DSG), conferred on her by the Diocese of Plymouth.

In 1987, Green was awarded Fellowship of the Royal College of Nursing (FRCN).

== Publications ==
'An examination of the professionalisation of the nursing profession in Great Britain and its concomitant status implications' B.A. dissertation. 1971

'Report on the enquiry amongst those who obtained the Sister Tutor's diploma in the years 1966-1970' (n.d.)
