= Eileen Rees =

British nurse and nursing educator

Eileen Rees OBE FRCN
- Born: 21 September 1912; Cardiff
- Died: 12 February 2008 (aged 95)
- Occupation: nurse
- Employer: Cardiff Royal Infirmary

Eileen Mary Rees OBE FRCN (21 September 1912 – 12 February 2008) was a British nurse and nurse educationalist.

== Early life ==
Born in Cardiff on 21 September 1912 to the Reverend Frederick Rees, Canon of Llandaff and Vicar of St Catherine, Canton and his wife, Charlotte. She had two brothers - Frederick and Arthur.

Rees was a pupil at Howell's school in Llandaff. Following completing her schooling she was offered a place to study French at University College Cardiff but decided to study nursing.

== Education and early career ==
Rees trained at Cardiff Royal Infirmary from 1931–1934. She was awarded the Gold Medal for her year qualifying as a State Registered Nurse.

Rees then undertook midwifery training and became a State Certified Midwife. Rees worked as a sister in the ear, nose and throat department of the Cardiff Royal Infirmary. During the second world war from 1941 - 1946 she served with the Queen Alexandra's Royal Army Nursing Corps in the Territorial Army in the Middle East and North Africa, including Egypt, Syria and Malta, working in the tented hospitals. Her focus was mainly operating theatre work where she was in charge of a large theatre unit of 2000 beds. While in the desert she organised theatre courses for nurses and doctors. She returned to her previous role until receiving a scholarship in September 1946 to study for a Certificate in Nursing Education and Administration at the University of Toronto. Following this she took up the position of assistant tutor at Cardiff Royal Infirmary from 1947-1950 before moving to St George’s Hospital, London. At St George's Rees was initially assistant matron and then deputy matron, working under Muriel Powell, who she regarded as her mentor. She returned to Wales to take up the position of matron at Cardiff Royal Infirmary.

Rees retired in 1973 following 15 years as matron at Cardiff Royal Infirmary and 2 years in the new position of Chief Nursing Officer at the University Hospital Wales which was instigated following the Salmon Report.

Rees, along with Muriel Powell, were part of the Royal Commission, chaired by Brian Salmon, and published the influential Salmon Report in 1966. Rees was then a member of the National Nursing Staff Committee which advised the Minister of Health on management training for nurses and midwives that ensured the recommendations of the Salmon Committee report were taken forward.

Rees was the Royal College of Nursing Chair of Council from 1961-64.

== Death ==
Rees died on 12 February 2008, aged 95.

== Honours ==
Rees was appointed Officer of the Order of the British Empire (OBE) in 1968.

Rees was honoured by the British Red Cross Society in 1971 and received life membership.

Rees received an Honorary Fellowship of the Royal College of Nursing in 1977.
