= Uprichard =

Uprichard is a surname. Notable people with the surname include:

- Ken Uprichard (born 1980), New Zealand archer
- Mary Uprichard (born 1938), British activist
- Norman Uprichard (1928–2011), Northern Ireland footballer

== See also ==
- Francis Upritchard (born 1976), New Zealand artist
