= Richard Stanton (disambiguation) =

Richard Stanton (1876–1956) was an American actor.

Richard Stanton may also refer to:

- Richard H. Stanton (1812–1891), American politician, lawyer, editor and judge
- Richard Stanton-Jones (1926–1991), British aeronautical engineer
- Rick Stanton (Richard William Stanton, born 1961/62), British firefighter and cave diver
- Rhiannon Davies and Richard Stanton, British maternity healthcare activists
- Richard Stanton, the alter ego of Madam Fatal
