= Febin Cyriac =

British-based Indian entrepreneur

- Febin Cyriac
- Occupation: Businessman
- Known for: Founder and CEO of Envertiz Consultancy

Febin Puthenkalayil Cyriac is a businessman based in Aberdeen, Scotland. He is the founder and chief executive officer of Envertiz Consultancy, a healthcare recruitment company incorporated in Scotland in 2014.

== Early life and education ==
Cyriac trained as a nurse in India and emigrated to the United Kingdom in 2010, where he completed a nursing degree.

== Career ==
Cyriac began his career as a nurse in India before emigrating to the United Kingdom in 2010. In England he worked in private nursing homes and the prison service, and for a nursing agency in the Cambridge area. He later moved to Aberdeen to work with a nursing recruitment agency, where he took on a business development role and became aware of shortages in the supply of nurses to the National Health Service (NHS) and of the barriers that English-language testing posed for overseas candidates.

In 2014, Cyriac founded Envertiz Consultancy, funding the venture from his savings, to recruit overseas nurses for the UK. He operated the business on a model that did not charge recruited nurses upfront fees, which was uncommon in the recruitment market in Kerala at the time. The company grew from a self-funded start-up into a business with around 100 employees and an annual turnover of about £20 million by 2019. It is headquartered in Aberdeen and mainly recruits nurses from India, for the NHS. By 2023, the company had recruited more than 10,000 nurses for over 100 NHS trusts.

=== Policy advocacy ===
In 2014, Cyriac started an online petition calling on the Nursing and Midwifery Council (NMC) to lower the IELTS English-language score required of overseas nurses. The petition, then signed by more than 3,600 people, gained wider attention in 2017. Cyriac also took part in a campaign, supported by the trade union Unison, that contributed to the NMC relaxing its English-language requirements.

== Recognition ==
In 2023, Cyriac was profiled in Forbes in an article about internationally trained nurses in the United Kingdom, and was profiled in Nursing Standard. He received the Business Excellence Award at the British Malayali Janaseva Awards in 2026.
