= Maternity in the United Kingdom =

Since the National Insurance Act 1911 there has been state involvement in provision of maternity services in the United Kingdom, although maternity hospitals existed in the eighteenth century.

== Maternal health and care ==
=== Safety and quality of care ===
In March 2023, NHS England published a three year delivery plan which sets out the ways to make maternity and neonatal care safer, more personalised and equitable. The plan has four main focus areas: compassionate care together with women and families; retaining and supporting workforce; a culture of safety, support and learning; and developing standards and structures underpinning improved future care.

=== Maternal death and morbidity ===
In the United Kingdom, Black women are four times more likely than White women to die during pregnancy, childbirth and in the year following childbirth. Asian women are twice as likely to die as White women. Epilepsy, heart disease and stroke most frequently cause death during pregnancy. Roughly 7 in 100,000 women from White groups die, 12 in 100,000 Asians die, 15 in 100,000 from mixed ethnicity die, roughly 32 in 100,000 black women die during pregnancy, childbirth or in the year after childbirth.

The Ockenden Review into maternity services at Shrewsbury and Telford Hospital NHS Trust examined 1600 cases over 20 years. There were concerns about 201 deaths, 29 cases of brain injury and 65 babies born with cerebral palsy. Neonatal deaths in England have dropped by a third and stillbirths by a quarter between 2010 and 2020. The Healthcare Safety Investigation Branch now investigates all serious maternity incidents - about 1000 each year. Jeremy Hunt argues for a no-fault compensation scheme to replace the expensive and prolonged legal processes currently used. He also suggests that compensation should only take account of costs which would be on top of NHS provision and denounces the principles where the children in rich families get more compensation than those in poor families.

The continuity of carer maternity model, introduced in 2016, which is aimed at improving care for patients from minority ethnic groups and those with other risk factors was suspended in more than 2/3 of hospital trusts in England in 2022 because of staffing shortages. The number of midwives working in the English NHS had dropped by more than 550 in the year.

=== Induction of labour ===
In 2018, 1 out of 3 women gave birth by labour induction. The procedure is often started without a thorough prior discussion with women or providing adequate information about the associated labour pain and potential risks. Induction of labour is often presented as the preferred option without explaining the alternatives. Providing good quality information in advance and involving women in decision making can improve their experiences.

=== Caesarean section ===
NHS trusts have for years been benchmarked on their caesarean rates with a target of 20% or less, but in 2022 these targets were abandoned, following multiple scandals within maternity units, the most prominent at Shrewsbury and Telford Hospital NHS Trust.

=== Midwives ===
The Midwives Act 1902 established a register of midwives, because of concerns about the large number of maternal and infant deaths. It became an offence to "habitually and for gain, attend women in childbirth otherwise than under the direction of a qualified medical practitioner unless she be certified under this Act". The register is still maintained by the Nursing and Midwifery Council.

== Maternity leave and benefits ==
=== Maternity benefits ===
The 1911 Act provided for maternity benefit of thirty shillings for the wives of those who paid National Insurance Contributions building on the model of the friendly societies.

Statutory Maternity Pay is payable to women who are employed and have worked long enough to qualify. Maternity Allowance is paid to those who do not qualify for it but have paid enough National Insurance Contributions.

=== Charging ===
Women who do not have ordinarily resident status in the United Kingdom are liable for charges for maternity services of around £7000 or more if there are complications. These charges discourage migrant women from accessing antenatal care. They can also be charged for miscarriages and stillbirths. These women don't have secure housing and they may receive care from more than one hospital and get more than one bill, sometimes several years later. According to the campaign group Maternity Action charges are often laid against women who are not liable as the complexities of immigration law defeat NHS clerical staff. Although women are not refused treatment if they cannot pay non-payment affects their immigration status.

== History ==
Maternity hospitals in the UK can be traced back to the 18th century. In 1939 there were about 2,100 maternity beds in London. Most women gave birth at home. At the outbreak of war most of these beds were closed and women were encouraged to leave the capital to give birth. Travel expenses were paid and 14 shillings a day for the five weeks lying in. The V bombing in 1944 led to the further evacuation of London hospitals. About 750 mothers every week were evacuated and emergency maternity homes were established in the countryside. Even after August 1945 200-300 women a week were leaving London to have their babies. National funding was withdrawn from 31 August 1945 but the London County Council continued to pay for the use of emergency maternity homes for women who could not have their babies at home. These arrangements appeared to have reduced infant mortality considerably. The birth rate was the highest for 15 years and the still birth rate was the lowest on record - 75% of the rate in 1938. The National Milk Scheme provided a pint of milk a day for 2d - the normal price was 4 1/2d - together with free cod liver oil and orange juice.
