= Association of Radical Midwives =

The Association of Radical Midwives (ARM) is a UK organisation for midwives, doulas, mothers, and anyone concerned with the health of maternity services.

The ARM was created by student midwives in 1976, and is a registered charity. Its founding members were concerned at the increasing medical intervention of childbirth, and used the initials of 'artificial rupture of membranes', a procedure which was becoming more common. ARM produces the quarterly journal Midwifery Matters.

The word 'radical' in the organisation's name means radical as in 'grassroots', or 'fundamental'. Retainment of honoring women's choices, including home birth, avoiding instrumental births, avoiding episiotomies, promoting vaginal birth, and continuity of carers are focuses of the group, as is the sharing of information.

The ARM has members within the Nursing and Midwifery Council (NMC), Association for the Improvement of maternity Services (AIMS), and the Royal College of Midwives (RCM).

Its members are midwives, student midwives and others committed to improving maternity services in the UK and internationally. The membership strongly believe that all women have the right to a service tailored closely to their needs, and a sympathetic attitude on the part of their professional attendants. Past members have included the late Mary Cronk MBE, and the late author Sheila Kitzinger.

The Association of Radical Midwives website holds information resources on pregnancy and birth, including articles and discussion and links to other maternity groups. The ARM also run groups around the UK who meet both formally and informally on an ad hoc basis to discuss maternity issues.
