= Brian Lawson Salmon =

British businessman

Brian Lawson Salmon CBE (30 June 1917 – June 2001), was a British businessman, the chairman of J. Lyons and Co. from 1972 to 1977, and the author of the Salmon Report on senior nursing staff structures and training.

== Early life ==
Salmon was born on 30 June 1917, and educated at Malvern College. He was the second of four sons of Julius Salmon (1888–1940) and his wife Emma Gluckstein, and a grandson of one of the founders of Lyons, Barnett Salmon.

== Career ==
=== Catering and hospitality ===
Salmon worked initially as a kitchen trainee and then as a food buyer in the family firm of Lyons.

Salmon was in the RAF from 1940 to 1946, rising to senior catering officer. He was the catering officer for the Indian sub-continent when there were "minor mutinies" over food complaints. He returned to the UK with jaundice and worked in the bakery and then hotel divisions of Lyons, before joining the governing board in 1961.

In the early 1960s, Salmon introduced the Wimpy hamburger to the UK, first in Lyons' cafes, then in a chain of Wimpy restaurants.

=== Health services ===
From 1949, Salmon chaired the catering committee of Westminster Hospital. He later joined the hospital's governing body.

In the 1960s, Salmon was appointed to chair the Salmon Report on senior nursing staff structures and training, which became "one of the bases of the modern profession".

From 1974 to 1977, Salmon was the chair of Camden and Islington Area Health Authority. He also worked with the Tavistock Institute, the Royal College of Nursing and the London & Provincial Nursing Trust.

=== Later life ===
In 1972, he was appointed a CBE. On his retirement in 1977, he was succeeded as chairman by his brother Neil Salmon, who merged Lyons with Allied Breweries to become Allied Lyons.

== Personal life ==
In 1946, Salmon married Annette Mackay, and they had two sons and a daughter. He died in June 2001, aged 83 or 84.
