= British Association of Urological Nurses =

Association for Urology Nurses in the UK

The British Association of Urological Nurses (BAUN) is an association based in the United Kingdom that exists to improve standards in urological care. As a UK registered charity, BAUN's executive affairs are governed by an elected board of working urology nurses. Full association members must be Nursing and Midwifery Council (NMC)–registered nurses but other global healthcare professionals with interests in urology may join as associate members.

== History ==
BAUN was founded in 1992 by Sarah Heatley, a urology nurse who wished to promote advancement in urological nursing and support the personal and professional development of urology nurses. The group was originally named "The British Urology Research Nurse Support Group" (BURNS). In April 1995, the organization evolved into a more general association and took its present name.

BAUN meetings were originally held as supplementary gatherings of the annual conference of the British Association of Urological Surgeons, with secondary independent meetings taking place later in the year. The first annual BAUN conference took place in 2001. Pre-conference one-day educational workshops focusing on skills development in sub-specialty clinical activities such as flexible cystoscopy and prostate biopsy were introduced in subsequent years.

== Organization ==
As a registered charity, BAUN is accountable to the Charity Commission. It is also required to follow standard charitable trust governance protocols. The Trustee board consists of eleven full members elected by eligible members of the association. The association requires representation from all four nations within the United Kingdom to be reflected within the executive. The executive officers are President, Vice President, Secretary and Treasurer. All members of the board are eligible to stand for election to any of these positions when a vacancy arises. All trustee members hold corporate responsibility, and as such are all registered with Companies House. Each trustee serves for a term of three years, after which they may stand for election again for a further three years. Once a six-year period of tenure has been served, the trustee must stand down for a further three years before being eligible for re-election.

BAUN are involved in the production of the International Journal of Urological Nursing, a journal for healthcare professionals with an interest or specialisation in urology

=== Aims ===
- Improve the care of urological patients in all healthcare settings.
- Provide educational opportunities including study days and conference.
- Provide educational materials including best practice guidelines.
- Provide networking, professional and personal development opportunities for BAUN members.
- Influence the national healthcare agenda and work collaboratively with other organizations including other charities to the benefit of patients.

== BAUN Presidents ==
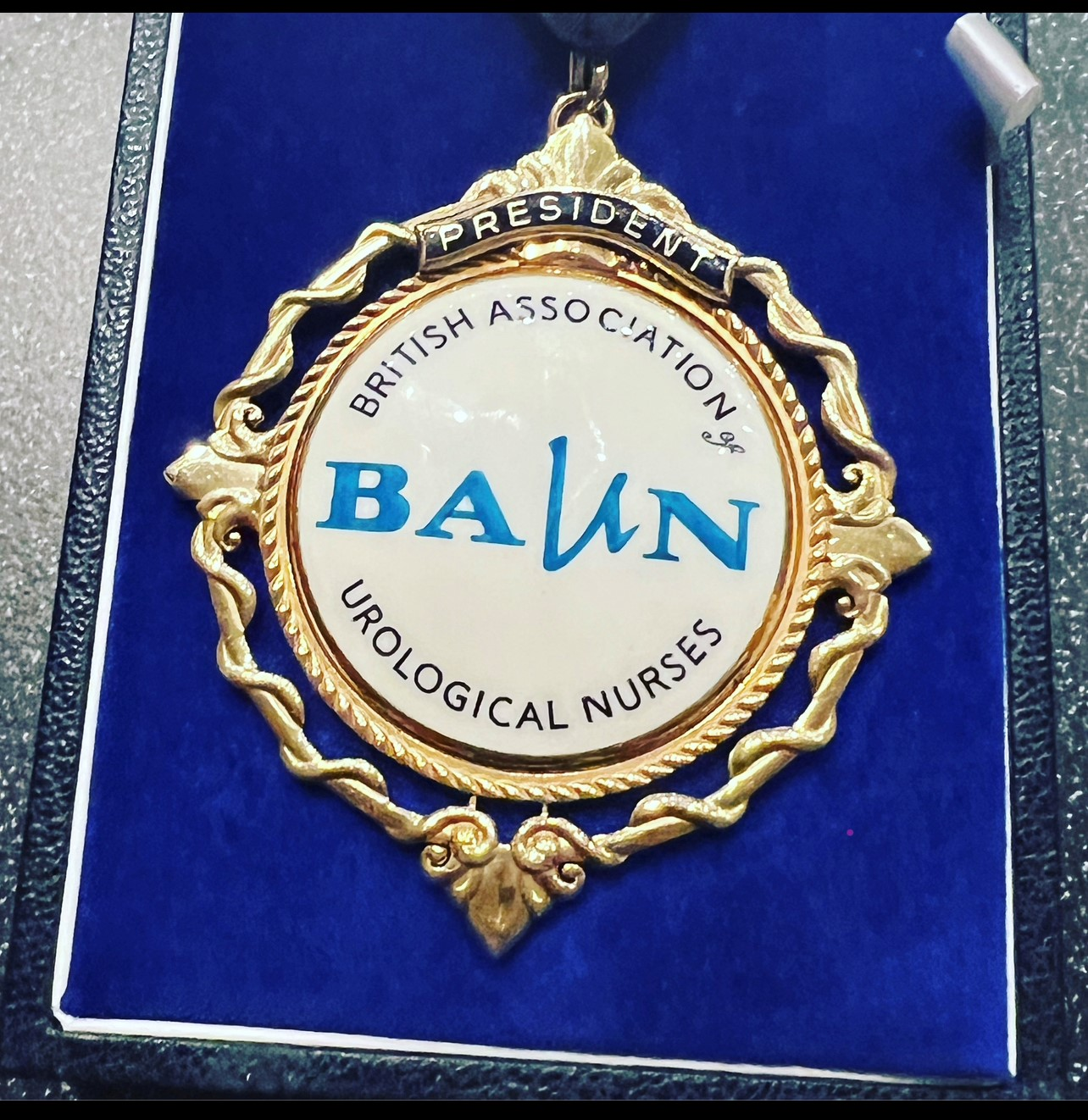
BAUN President's Medal

- Sarah Heatley, 1995–1997
- Mary Kirkham, 1997–2002
- Lyn Kirkwood, 2002–2004
- Jerome Marley, 2004–2006
- Tom Ladds, 2006–2008
- Lucinda Poulton, 2008–2012
- Philippa Aslet, 2012–2014
- Fiona Sexton, 2014–2016
- Julia Taylor, MBE, 2016–2018
- Jane Brocksom, 2018–2020
- Clare Waymont, 2020–2022
- Sarah Hillery, 2022–2024
- Emma Chappel, 2024 - present
