= Princess Royal Hospital, Telford =

Princess Royal Hospital
- Shrewsbury and Telford Hospital NHS Trust
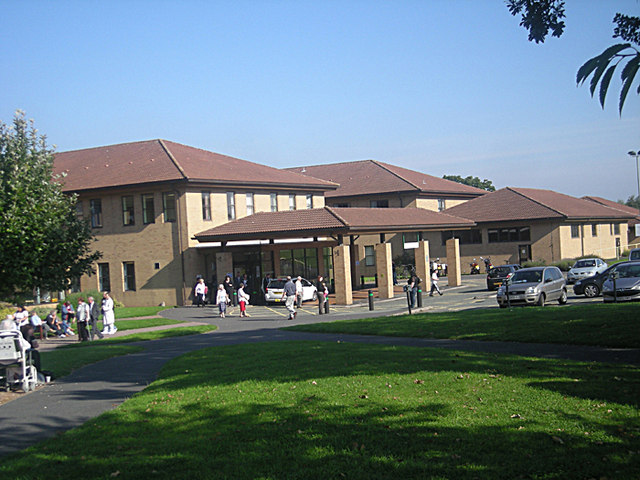
- Princess Royal Hospital

- Shown in Shropshire

Geography
- Location: Telford, Shropshire, England
- Coordinates: 52.712°N 2.512°W

Organisation
- Care system: NHS
- Type: Teaching
- Affiliated university: Keele University Medical School; Staffordshire University

Services
- Emergency department: Yes
- Beds: 327

History
- Founded: 1989

Links
- Website: www.sath.nhs.uk

The Princess Royal Hospital is a teaching hospital located in Apley Castle, Telford, England. It forms the Telford site of the Shrewsbury and Telford Hospital NHS Trust and serves patients in Telford and Wrekin, the rest of Shropshire, and Powys, in conjunction with the Royal Shrewsbury Hospital.

== History ==
The hospital, which is laid out using the nucleus design concept with a standard cruciform floor plan template with facilities on each side of a hospital 'street', was completed in 1989.

In 2012, a re-organisation took place whereby inpatient general and vascular services were consolidated at the Royal Shrewsbury Hospital, while inpatient children's, maternity, gynaecological and breast surgery beds were concentrated on the Princess Royal Hospital site. Balfour Beatty carried out the works to build a new Women and Children's Unit at the Princess Royal Hospital.

== Performance ==
The Trust was fined £333,000 in November 2017 after four patients sustained fatal falls at the Princess Royal Hospital between June 2011 and November 2012.

In July 2018 fears were expressed by the local Telford and Wrekin council that overnight accident and emergency closures could be on the horizon for the hospital and in September 2018 it was announced that the A&E department would be closed from 8pm to 8am each night and patients diverted to the Royal Wolverhampton NHS Trust and the Royal Shrewsbury Hospital. This was after the Care Quality Commission had served the trust with an enforcement notice over the safety of its emergency services. Only 68.4% of A&E attenders met the 4 hour targets in the first quarter of 2018–19. However, after the hospital managed to recruit more A&E doctors and nurses the overnight A&E closure was cancelled.

In January 2019 plans to convert the accident and emergency department into an urgent care centre and turn the hospital into a planned care site were approved by the clinical commissioning group.

== Services ==
The hospital has 327 inpatient beds.

== Notable patients ==
Those reported to have died at the hospital include:

- Norman Jones, former actor (2013)
- Dalian Atkinson, former professional footballer, confirmed dead after arrival after being tasered in an incident by police (2016)

== See also ==
- List of hospitals in England
