= June Crown =

British public health specialist

June Crown CBE, FRCP, FFPH
- Born: June Madge Crown; 1938 (age 87–88)
- Education: University of Cambridge; Middlesex Hospital Medical School; London School of Hygiene and Tropical Medicine
- Employer: National Health Service England

June Madge Crown (born 1938) is a British public health specialist.

She qualified at the University of Cambridge, Middlesex Hospital Medical School and the London School of Hygiene and Tropical Medicine, then worked as a National Health Service Area Medical Officer in Brent and Harrow, and as a District Medical Officer in Bloomsbury.

In 1989, Crown headed a committee examining nurse prescribing following the recommendations of the Cumberlege Report. In 1997, Crown again headed a committee reviewing prescribing practices.

Crown has advised the World Health Organization since 1980 and from 1995 to 1998 was President of the Faculty of Public Health.

Crown was made a Commander of the Order of the British Empire (CBE) in the 1998 Birthday Honours, "For services to Public Health". She is also a Fellow of the Royal College of Physicians (FRCP), and a Fellow of the Faculty of Public Health (FFPH).
