= Royal Shrewsbury Hospital =

- Shrewsbury and Telford Hospital NHS Trust
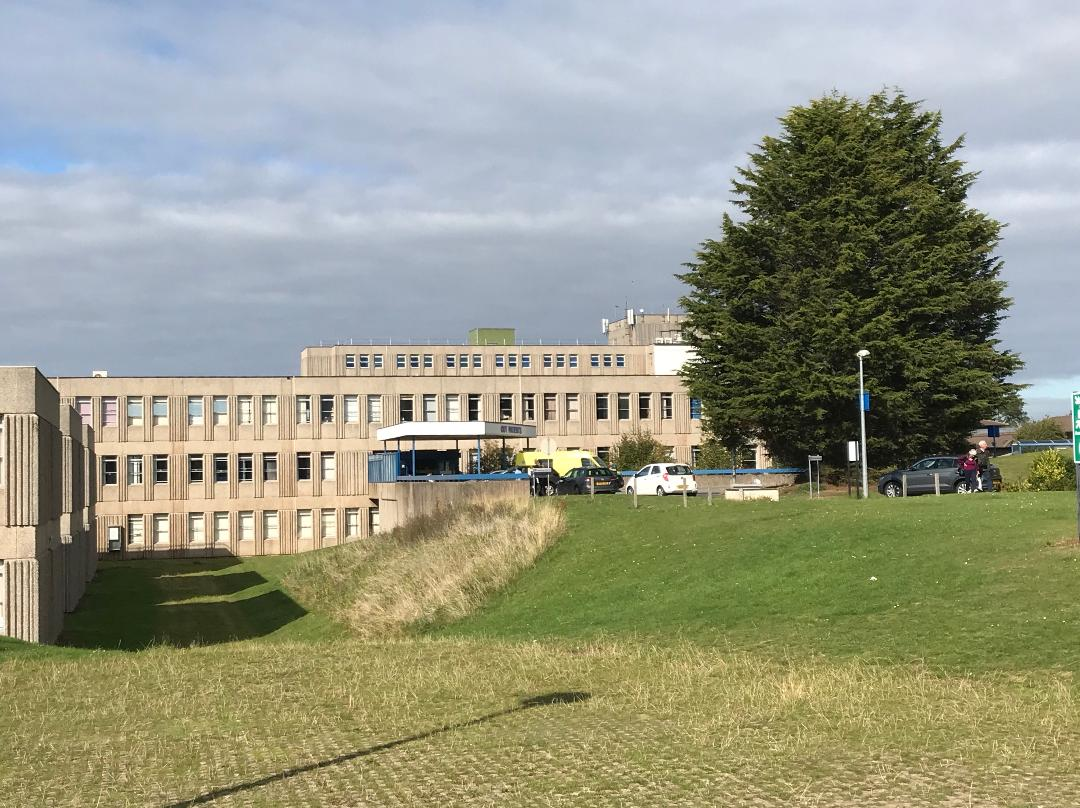
- The hospital in September 2019

- Shown in Shropshire

Geography
- Location: Mytton Oak Road, Shrewsbury, Shropshire, England
- Coordinates: 52.709°N 2.793°W

Organisation
- Care system: National Health Service
- Type: Teaching
- Affiliated university: Keele University Medical School; Staffordshire University

Services
- Emergency department: Yes
- Beds: 492

History
- Founded: 1979

Links
- Website: www.sath.nhs.uk/patients-visitors/getting-to-us/royal-shrewsbury-hospital/

The Royal Shrewsbury Hospital is a teaching hospital in Shrewsbury, Shropshire, England. It forms the Shrewsbury site of the Shrewsbury and Telford Hospital NHS Trust, serving patients from Shropshire (including Telford and Wrekin) and Powys, in conjunction with the Princess Royal Hospital in Telford.

== History ==
The hospital, which was built to replace the Royal Salop Infirmary in the centre of Shrewsbury and the Copthorne Hospital on the opposite side of the Mytton Oak Road, was opened by the Prince of Wales in 1979. Expansion of the hospital took place when services were transferred from the Eye, Ear and Throat Hospital in Mount St in the centre of Shrewsbury in 1998. The latter dated from 1879 to 1881 and is a Grade II listed building. Historic picture tiles depicting Faith, Hope and Charity were moved from the Eye, Ear and Throat Hospital to the Royal Shrewsbury Hospital.

The site on the opposite side of the Mytton Oak Road, formerly occupied by the Copthorne Hospital, was deemed surplus to requirements and sold for development to create affordable housing in 2007. Of the housing subsequently built, called Copthorne Grange, two of its roads, Seacole Way and Cavell Drive were named after famous wartime nurses.

== Notable patients ==
Those reported to have died there include:

- William Alonzo Parker – former Anglican Bishop of Shrewsbury (1982)
- David Ormsby-Gore, 5th Baron Harlech – Conservative politician and former Ambassador to the United States (1985, after car crash).
- George Herbert, 7th Earl of Powis - peer (1993)
- John Biffen, Baron Biffen - Conservative politician (2007)
- Bertram ('Jimmy') James – former Royal Air Force officer and Great Escape survivor (2008)
- Pete Postlethwaite – actor (2011)
- Geoff Morris – retired professional footballer, notably Walsall and Shrewsbury Town (2015).
- Guy N. Smith – writer (2020)
- Raymond Froggatt – Country singer/songwriter (2023)

== See also ==
- Princess Royal Hospital, Telford - the other site of the Shrewsbury and Telford Hospital NHS Trust
- List of hospitals in England
