= United Kingdom Central Council for Nursing, Midwifery and Health Visiting =

Healthcare regulators in the United Kingdom (1983–2002)

United Kingdom Central Council for Nursing Midwifery and Health Visiting
- Abbreviation: UKCC
- Predecessor: General Nursing Council
- Successor: Nursing and Midwifery Council
- Formation: 1983
- Dissolved: 2002
- Location: 23 Portland Place London

United Kingdom Central Council for Nursing, Midwifery and Health Visiting (UKCC) (1983-2002) was the statutory regulator for nursing, midwifery and health visitors in the UK. The UKCC maintained a register of all nurses, midwives and health visitors eligible to practise within the UK. It set and reviews standards for their education, training and performance. The UKCC also investigated allegations of impaired fitness to practise (i.e. where these standards were not met) and had the authority to strike individuals from the register. The UKCC was preceded by the General Nursing Council and succeeded by the Nursing and Midwifery Council.

== Creation and responsibilities ==
The United Kingdom Central Council for Nursing, Midwifery and Health Visiting (UKCC) was set up on 1 July 1983, following the Nurses, Midwives and Health Visitors Act 1979. It replaced the General Nursing Council for England and Wales (GNC) established by the Nurses Registration Act 1919, the Central Midwives Board in London and seven other bodies.

Amny of the changes were prompted by the Briggs Report (1972) which suggested that a single statutory body, the Central Nursing and Midwifery Council, should oversee professional standards, education and discipline, rather than the three existing organisations, the General Nursing Council, the Central Midwives Board and the Council for the Training of Health Visitors. The structural changes recommended by the report were so complex that they were not accepted until 1974. They were not implemented until the United Kingdom Central Council for Nursing, Midwifery and Health Visiting (Electoral Scheme) Order of 1982, with UKCC finally being created in 1983.

The UKCC was expected to maintain a register of UK nurses, midwives and health visitors, provide guidance to registrants, and handle professional misconduct complaints. At the same time, National Boards were created for each of the UK countries. Their main functions were to monitor the quality of nursing and midwifery education courses, and to maintain the training records of students on these courses.

=== UKCC main responsibilities ===
- To establish and improve standards of training and professional conduct for nurses, midwives and health visitors
- To determine the rules for registration and to maintain a single professional register
- To provide guidance to the profession and standards of professional conduct by means of the code оf conduct
- To act, through the professional conduct committee and the health committee, to protect the public from unsafe members of the profession

=== National boards' main responsibilities ===
- To arrange courses enabling people to qualify for registration and courses of further training meeting the UKCC requirements as to their content and standard
- To arrange for examinations to be held
- To carry out investigations of cases of alleged misconduct with a view to proceedings before the UKCC professional conduct committee,
- To work with the UKCC to promote and improve training methods.

== The register ==
When first set up in 1983, the UKCC Register was made up of 11 parts. This allowed the Council to assume responsibility for registering all nurses, midwives and health visitors in the UK. These parts covered the different branches of nursing (mental health, children, learning disability and adult). The registers also covered different levels of nursing, reflecting former types of training and qualifications. Employers and others were able to check the current registered status of any nurse, midwife and health visitor and their entitlement to practise. The Register remains accessible via The National Archives (United Kingdom)

The 11 parts were:

1. Registered General Nurse
2. Enrolled Nurse (General)
3. Registered Mental Nurse
4. Enrolled Nurse (Mental)
5. Registered Nurse for the Mentally Handicapped
6. Enrolled Nurse (Mental Handicap)
7. Enrolled Nurse
8. Registered Sick Children's Nurse
9. Fever Nurse
10. Registered Midwife
11. Registered Health Visitor.

By 1989 the register had increased to 15 parts. The new parts were for:

- Qualified students following a course of preparation in adult nursing
- qualified students following a course of preparation in mental health
- qualified students following a course of preparation in mental handicap nursing; and qualified students following a course of preparation in children's nursing.

=== Main changes ===
The main changes to the 'rules' in 1983 were:

- Minimum age of entry was changed to 17½ years except in certain circumstances (such as those applying in Scotland) where 17 was acceptable. The national boards were to be given discretion as to whether they wished to retain the present minimum of 18
- For rule purposes only, registered and enrolled nurses were referred to as first and second level nurses
- From January 11986 all first level entrants would have to possess either 5 O’ levels or equivalent, or have passed the council’s test
- Work was to begin in 1983 on new rules for midwifery training and practice, together with a new midwife’s code of practice
- The new health visitors' rules were to be based largely on the revised guidelines issued by the Council for the Education and Training of Health

== Legal case against UKCC fees ==
On 13 March 1989 a school nurse failed in a High Court attempt to stop nurses having to pay the annual fee to register with the UKCC. The nurse asserted the UKCC acted unfairly by charging an annual fee of £10. She said that in 1982 she paid a £31 fee to register for life with the General Nursing Council, which was later taken over by the UKCC. But Lord Justice Stuart-Smith and Mr Justice Schiemann said the council could legally impose the fee.

== Move to graduate courses ==
In 1990, the UKCC introduced Project 2000, a higher education scheme in the United Kingdom for nursing qualifications. In 1991 the UKCC agreed on proposals for Post-registration Education and Practice (PREP). PREP took several years to introduce, with the final framework being agreed in 1994, and the scheme itself being introduced in 1995. PREP developed into the current scheme of Revalidation which was implemented by the NMC in April 2016.

== Establishment of the Nursing and Midwifery Council ==
This structure of the UKCC survived with minor modifications up to April 2002, when the UKCC ceased to exist and its functions were taken over by a new Nursing and Midwifery Council (NMC). This was legislated for in the Parliament of the United Kingdom, through the Nursing and Midwifery Order 2001. The English National Board was also abolished and its quality assurance function was taken on board by the NMC. The other National Boards were also abolished, but new bodies were created in each country to take over their functions.

The UKCC became The Nursing and Midwifery Council (NMC) on April 1, 2002

== Key UKCC board members and staff ==
Mary Cronk was part of UKCC's England Board. Audrey Emerton, Baroness Emerton, Chair of UKCC (c.1989). Margaret Dorothy Green was instrumental in the setting up of UKCC, she was Chair of UKCC and was instrumental in Project 2000.^{[1]} Catherine Mary Hall was Chair of UKCC (1980–1985). Colin Ralph was Registrar and Chief Executive (1987-1994). Maude Storey was the first Registrar and Chief Executive (1983-1987). Mary Uprichard was the first President of UKCC from 27 April 1993. Stanley Holder was elected a UKCC board member from 1983. Dora Opoku helped develop its code of conduct c.2001.

== See also ==
- General Nursing Council
- Nursing and Midwifery Council
- Nursing in the United Kingdom
- History of nursing in the United Kingdom
- List of nursing organisations in the United Kingdom
- Royal College of Nursing
- Royal College of Midwives
- Maternity in the United Kingdom
