= Ockendon =

Ockendon could refer to:

== People ==
- Hilary Ockendon (born 1941), British mathematician
- James Ockendon (1890–1966), English sergeant
- John Ockendon (born 1940), British mathematician

== Places in England, UK ==
- North Ockendon in Havering, London
- South Ockendon in Thurrock, Essex
  - Ockendon railway station
  - Ockendon (ward)
  - South Ockendon Windmill

== See also ==
- Ockenden (disambiguation)
