= Professional Standards Authority for Health and Social Care =

Regulator of healthcare regulators in the UK

The Professional Standards Authority for Health and Social Care (PSA), formerly the Council for Healthcare Regulatory Excellence (CHRE) and the Council for the Regulation of Health Care Professionals, oversees the ten statutory bodies that regulate health professionals in the United Kingdom and social care in England. Where occupations are not subject to statutory regulation, it sets standards for those organisations that hold voluntary registers and accredits those that meet them.

Professional Standards Authority for Health and Social Care

Until 30 November 2012 it was known as the Council for Healthcare Regulatory Excellence (CHRE). It is an independent body, which is accountable to the Parliament of the United Kingdom. It assesses the performance of each regulator, conducts audits, scrutinises their decisions and reports to Parliament. It seeks to achieve balance in the oversight of regulation through the application of the concept of right-touch regulation.

== History ==
The Health Act 1999 allowed the UK government to more easily change healthcare regulatory arrangements, through orders of the Privy Council. The Kennedy report into the Bristol heart scandal was published in July 2001 and plans for a body to oversee the regulation of healthcare professionals in the UK quickly followed. The Council for Healthcare Regulatory Excellence was set up under the National Health Service Reform and Health Care Professions Act 2002 and renamed the Council for Healthcare Regulatory Excellence (CHRE) in 2004. The CHRE was succeeded by the Professional Standards Authority for Health and Social Care, which was set up under section 222 of the Health and Social Care Act 2012.

== Oversight of the regulators ==
The Authority covers the 10 statutory bodies that regulate health professionals in the UK and social workers in England:

- General Chiropractic Council
- General Dental Council
- General Medical Council
- General Optical Council
- General Osteopathic Council
- Health and Care Professions Council
- Nursing and Midwifery Council
- Pharmaceutical Society of Northern Ireland
- General Pharmaceutical Council
- Social Work England (became operational in Dec 2019)

== Voluntary registers ==
The Authority also has a role in encouraging the upkeep of standards in practitioners that are not subject to regulation. Accredited registers are a voluntary scheme where the PSA sets out some standards that are applicable to organisations that deal with occupations that are not statutorily regulated. The PSA accredits organisations that hold voluntary registers, offering a "quality mark" to those that show they have met various standards.

In July 2026 there were 21 organisations with voluntary registers that had been given accreditation.

Accreditation of a voluntary register does not mean that the PSA endorses a particular approach or therapy. The Authority is not concerned whether any of the methodologies used by societies on this scheme have any scientific validity. It regards the question of scientific veracity as a matter of opinion.

== Funding ==
The devolved administrations of Scotland, Wales and Northern Ireland all fund the authority, with contributions in line with the Barnett formula.

== Limits on Powers ==
The PSA has no powers to investigate individual complaints about the regulators it oversees, nor to compel them to take any specific action. Its website states “We do not investigate individuals’ complaints about regulators or registers and cannot resolve them for you.”

== Premises Regulation ==
The PSA's focus is on the regulation of individuals – and not premises – though it oversees both the General Pharmaceutical Council and the Pharmaceutical Society of Northern Ireland, which both have responsibility for premises regulation. Its website states: “We help to protect the public by improving the regulation and registration of people who work in health and care.” As such, there is a significant gap in the oversight of pharmacy premises regulation in the UK.

The PSA's Standards of Good Regulation are accordingly focused on the regulation of individuals and not premises. Its website claims untruthfully that “The Standards cover all aspects of the regulators’ work including where the regulator has responsibility for businesses and premises as well as individuals.” The standards contain no specific mention of premises; none of the individual standards are focused on premises; they do not invite separation of results where a regulator has responsibility for regulating both individuals and premises and they make no mention of inspection outcomes. Many of the standards are exclusively focused on individuals; for example, they refer to a “registrant”, which by definition is a person who has registered; a set of premises cannot register itself. It is capable of being registered, but incapable of being a registrant. In addition, references to “fitness to practise” in its standards do not apply to premises, since premises cannot themselves “practise”. Such terms are not used in reference to premises regulation. There are no measures relating to the success of any applicable inspection regime (e.g. outcomes by standards type, premises type or stage of sanction) nor of the systemic/environmental effects of standards in premises on patient safety.

Its lack of focus on premises regulation can be seen, for example, in its report on the GPhC for 2018/19, which contains very little mention, focus or insight into premises regulation.
