= National Network of Learning Disability Nursing =

The National Network of Learning Disability Nursing (NNLDN) is a voluntary network run by learning disability nurses from the United Kingdom and Republic of Ireland for Learning Disability Nurses. It was set up in 1990s following the English National Board of Nursing learning disability conference in Ripon & York College to be an umbrella network of networks for specialist networks of learning disability practitioners to exchange good practice and promote better standards of nursing care around the UK. Its last major contribution to practice development was as part of the UK Modernising Learning Disabilities Nursing Review in 2012 published as Strengthening the Commitment (DH April 2012). The network also acts as a vehicle for a national development conference held annually across each country in the United Kingdom and the Republic of Ireland, the last of which was held at Bangor University in July 2011.

The NNLDN also supports the Fiona Law Student award which is given at the National Positive Choices Learning disabilities Conference for Student Learning Disability Nurses every year. The network has operated primarily as a social media forum since 2013 from which other networking groups have now developed including their website a resource for nursing students on learning disability nursing and Learning Disability Nurse Chat #LDNURSECHAT a Twitter forum for qualified practitioners to exchange and share good practice. The NNLDN stills hold seminars and workshops from time to time which are promoted via the networks it represents.
