= Postoperative wounds =

Wound sustained from a surgical operation

Postoperative wounds are those wounds acquired during surgical procedures. Postoperative wound healing occurs after surgery and normally follows distinct bodily reactions: the inflammatory response, the proliferation of cells and tissues that initiate healing, and the final remodeling. Postoperative wounds are different from other wounds in that they are anticipated and treatment is usually standardized depending on the type of surgery performed. Since the wounds are 'predicted' actions can be taken beforehand and after surgery that can reduce complications and promote healing.

== Healing sequence ==
The body responds to postoperative wounds in the same manner as it does to tissue damage acquired in other circumstances. The inflammatory response is designed to create homeostasis. This first step is called the inflammatory stage. The next stage and wound healing is the infiltration of leukocytes and release of cytokines into the tissue. The inflammatory response and the infiltration of leukocytes occur simultaneously. The final stage of postoperative wound healing is called remodeling. Remodeling restores the structure of the tissue and that tissues ability to regain its function.

== Diagnosis ==
Surgical wounds can begin to open between three and five days after surgery. The wound usually appears red and can be accompanied by drainage. Clinicians delay re-opening the wound unless it is necessary due to the potential of other complications. If the surgical wound worsens, or if a rupture of the digestive system is suspected the decision may be to investigate the source of the drainage or infection.

== Complications ==
=== Wound dehiscence ===
The rates of a surgical wound opening after surgery has remained constant. When a wound opens after surgery, the hospital stay becomes longer and the medical care becomes more intensive if a surgical wound opens after surgery.

=== Infection ===
Infection will complicate healing of surgical wounds and is commonly observed. Most infections are present within the first 30 days after surgery. Surgical wounds can become infected by bacteria, regardless if the bacteria is already present on the patient's skin or if the bacteria is spread to the patient due to contact with infected individuals. Wound infections can be superficial (skin only), deep (muscle and tissue), or spread to the organ or space where the surgery occurred. Recent studies have established that infection after surgery can occur after several years post surgery, and these infection rates are not recorded due to loss in patient follow up, hard to access record of previous surgery, visiting a new surgeon, lack of requirement from national registries etc.

=== Fascia dehiscence ===
The surgical site or wound may allow the passage of air into the body. This most often occurs after abdominal and pelvic surgery. Treatment at this point becomes more complex depending upon the extent of the opening, where it occurs and if contents of the digestive system have entered the body.

== Risks ==
The risk of complications of the surgical wound is greater for those greater than 65-years-old, or who have pulmonary disease, nutritional deficiencies, overweight, other illnesses and high blood pressure.

== Prevention ==
Complications of postsurgical wounds can be reduced before, during and after surgery.

Some measures such as antibiotic prophylaxis before caesarean section and hernial repair are useful in reducing surgical site infection. Intravenous prophylactic antibiotics are recommended, to be administered within one hour from the beginning of the surgical procedure. In addition to i.v. prophylaxis, oral antibiotic prophylaxis has been demonstrated to be beneficial in reducing surgical site infections after elective large bowel surgery. Adding a mechanical bowel cleansing in these patients might not be beneficial after colonic resection, but is still used and recommended by many before rectal resection (ideally in combination with oral antibiotics) However, some options include antibiotic coated sutures, antibiotic impregnated cement or locally administered paste or gel. Of note, a recent randomised controlled trial performed in low- and middle-income countries did not report any reduction in surgical site infection after abdominal surgery with antiseptic (triclosan-coated) sutures. There is also evidence that adhesive tapes increase infection risks.

Before surgery, clinicians can treat the patient to reduce hemoglobin A1c levels to less than 7%. Those anticipating surgery can reduce their risk of complications by stopping smoking thirty days prior to surgery. The patient's skin can be evaluated for the presence of Staphylococcus aureus prior to surgery since this bacterium causes wound infections in postoperative wounds. Treating any other infections prior to surgery also reduces the risks of a postoperative wound infection. Examples of these pre-existing infections are urinary tract infection or lower reproductive system infection. Removing the hair where the skin will be cut helps to reduce the risk of complications, though shaving is not considered to be appropriate and instead depilatories are used. Those who come in contact with the person who is receiving the surgery clean and disinfect their own skin surfaces. The patient's skin is also cleaned, scrubbed and treated with antiseptics. Patients undergoing surgery often receive antibiotics before surgery.

During the surgery, there are several precautions that can be taken to reduce the risk of postoperative wound complications. These are: minimizing traffic in the operating room, providing adequate ventilation, not closing wounds that are infected, minimize tissue handling, re-administer prophylactic antibiotics if large amounts of fluid are lost during surgery, and keeping the patient warm. Lately, studies have highlighted new preventative measures of avoiding repeated reprocessing and intraoperatively guarding the implants in the sterile-field, for surgeries implanting single-use devices such as orthopedic and spine surgeries.

The risk of complications after surgery can be reduced by: maintaining blood glucose levels in the normal range and constant evaluation of surgical site infection.

There is insufficient evidence to show that whether applying cyanoacrylate microbial sealants on the wound site before operation is effective in reducing surgical site infection post surgery.

There is no evidence that one type of hand antisepsis is better than the other in preventing surgical site infection.

There is no evidence that plastic adhesive tapes reduces surgical site infections.

== See also ==
- List of surgeries by type
