= National Association of Chief Male Nurses =

Nursing organisation in the UK

- Nickname: National Association of Chief Male Nurses (Mental Health Service)
- Successor: Association of Nurse Administrators
- Formation: 1953

The National Association of Chief Male Nurses 1953–1968 was created from a section of Chief Male Nurses in The Society of Registered Male Nurses. It amalgamated with Association of Nurse Administrators.

== History ==
Initially referred to as the National Association of Chief Male Nurses (Mental Health Service) representing the interests of hospital-based male nurses. The first annual general meeting was held at Littlemore Hospital with around 65 members present, including from Glasgow, Newcastle, Belfast, Exeter and the Midland and London. The meeting reported that the association had been accepted for membership of the World Federation for Mental Health, was affiliated to the National Association for Mental Health and was discussing affiliation with the National Council of Nurses. By the next annual general meeting in 1955 the membership was 180.

The Royal College of Nursing's extension of membership to all registered nurses (including mental health and male nurses registers) in the summer of 1960 was welcomed by the association, who saw membership of both organisations as a positive step forward.

The Salmon Report on Senior Nursing Staff Structure of 1966 sought to standardise structure and pay for senior hospital nurses in England and Scotland. This had an impact on the Chief Male Nurses who saw their numbers decline. The Association had ongoing discussions on whether to merge with one of the other nursing associations. A 1966 article led with the line Are we to marry the matrons’ association or are they going to marry us? It wasn't until June 1974 that they merged with the matrons into the Association of Nurse Administrators.

Voluntary postholders included President Alfred Baldwin 1966-1967; Honorary Secretary John Barry c. 1966; Chair Mr E Dawson c.1955. T Thompson Chief Male Nurse Hellingly Hospital 1951-1965 was one of the founder members of the association.
