= FRCN =

FRCN may stand for:

- Federal Radio Corporation of Nigeria
- Fellow of the Royal College of Nursing
- Financial Reporting Council of Nigeria
