= Mary Cronk =

British midwife

Mary Cronk MBE (1934 – 21 December 2018) was an independent midwife from Scotland who was awarded her MBE for services to midwifery over her many years of practice.

== Early life ==
Cronk was born in Glasgow in 1932, the daughter of a Clydeside ship worker. She first studied nursing at Glasgow Royal Infirmary, and in 1957 started training to be a midwife at Queen Charlotte's in London.

== Career ==
Cronk worked for the National Health Service in the UK where she facilitated more than 1600 births, mainly as home births. In 1991, she opened her own practice and started working as an independent midwife.

Cronk joined the English National Board of the United Kingdom Central Council for Nursing, Midwifery and Health Visiting, and served on the RCM Council between September 1999 and August 2003.

Cronk also wrote many articles on midwifery, covering a variety of topics, including physiological breech birth, of which she was a proponent. These have been published in Midwifery Matters and AIMS Journal, as well as quoted in various books.

Once retired, Cronk continued to educate by hosting study days alongside fellow independent midwife Jane Evans; the pair disseminated information on unusual but normal births, including breech birth.

== Obituary ==
Cronk died on 21 December 2018, aged 86.

== Selected publications ==
- "The Midwife: A Professional Servant?". 2000. in Mavis Kirkham (15 September 2010). The Midwife-Mother Relationship. Palgrave Macmillan. pp. 50–. ISBN 978-1-137-13276-5. Chapter 4.
- "Community midwifery: a practical guide". with Caroline Flint 1989
- Radical Midwifery: Celebrating 21 Years of A.R.M. 1997. Margaret Jowitt, Ishbel Kargar, with contributions by Cronk
- "Keep Your Hands off the Breech". AIMS Journal, Vol 10 No 3. 1998.
