= Society of Registered Male Nurses =

British organisation (1937–1967)

- Formation: 1937
- Dissolved: 1967
- Secretary and Founder: Edward J. Glavin

The Society of Registered Male Nurses founded in 1937 for nurse in the UK. It briefly changed its name to the Society of Male Nurses Ltd in 1966 before disbanding in 1967; the company was wound up in 1969.

== History ==
The Society of Registered Male Nurses was a British professional body for male nurses founded in 1937 with six members including Mr Edward J. Glavin. Prior to the Society there were a number of small agencies that placed trained male nurses, often from the co-operative movement such as the Male Nurses (Temperance) Co-operation. Male nurses also joined unions, such as the National Asylum Workers' Union (established in 1910), but the professional nursing organisations in the United Kingdom were exclusively female.

Although the General Nursing Council (GNC) had registered men since its first registers in 1922, by 1937 men were still only recognised in a supplementary GNC Register. Men in nursing mainly trained and worked in the mental health and learning disability institutions (psychiatric hospital), or were medical orderlies with the military. In 1937 only seven general hospitals in England trained male nurses.

The Society's stated aim was 'To maintain and promote the traditional dignity and status of the male nurse, thus increasing and improving the professional status and dignity of the male nurse' From the start the Society was aligned with the Royal College of Nursing (then the College of Nursing, later known as the RCN), and its aims were strikingly similar to that of the College. The Society was later to formally affiliate with the College. Glavin struck up a professional friendship with Frances Goodall, the then General Secretary of the College, who had advised him to set up the Society to improve the representation of men in nursing.

A first meeting of the Society took place at the College in July 1937. More members were enrolled at a meeting on 8 September 1937, which was again held at the College and progress was made towards the formation of a student male nurses' section. The second meeting also proposed that only those male nurses registered with the GNC were to be eligible for membership of the new organisation. This created a division among those present and the men holding the Royal Medico-Psychological Association (MPA) certificate, which at that time was not recognised by the GNC.

At this time nursing associations, including the College, only admitted general trained nurses - excluding mental health nurses. In contrast the Society of Registered Male Nurses actively included them, with the Society's committee aiming to consist of equal numbers of general and mental trained members, to ensure balanced representation. The key criteria was that members had to be on one of the GNC nursing registers. Membership was open to male nurses, including those on the Scottish and Irish Nursing Registers. Membership fees were initially set at £1 Is. per year.

Restricting membership to men on the GNC Nursing Registers restricted the Society's membership. The RMPA ran the majority of the mental health and learning disability nurse training courses. The preliminary training for the RMPA courses was three months, whilst the GNC approved preliminary course lasted one year. Candidates for both the RMPA and GNC training then completed a further two years. Due to the length, increased cost, and perceived irrelevance of the course significantly fewer male nurses therefore enrolled on GNC approved courses or the GNC register. The GNC and the College argued that the educational entry requirements for these courses were lower than that for the General Nursing Council courses.

Post-qualification training was mainly provided by the College of Nursing where, although men could not be members, they could attend courses. In 1942 John Williams, an industrial nurse, became the first man to hold a College training certificate.

The College gave one of its Whitley Council seats to the Society of Registered Male Nurses, and John Sawyer, Society Secretary, was the first male nurse to hold a national negotiating office.

Issues around training and eligibility continued after World War II when, in response to the nursing shortage, the government sought to reduce the registration requirements for male nurses. Men with a minimum of two years' ward experience under a trained nurse, were eligible for a one year nurse training course, as opposed to the three year course required for women who wanted to join the General Nursing Register. This created tensions between the College and the Society.

In addition, tensions were created over pay. The Society officially supported the College in their involvement in the Equal Pay Campaign Committee, but the Society's members were often alienated from the cause of equal pay for women. Male nurses were often paid significantly more than female nurses which the Campaign highlighted, so the Society's members felt that the College was focused on issues that did not apply to them.

The post-war shortage of nurses, the need to find employment for de-mobbed men and the introduction of the National Health Service led to General Adult Nursing courses opening up to men. The Nurses Act 1949 abolished the separate register for male nurses and placed qualified men on the General Register of Nurses. The hospital training schools that had previously only accepted female probationers opened their doors to men, and the number of male nursing students increased.

In 1953 the National Association of Chief Male Nurses was created from a section of Chief Male Nurses in The Society of Registered Male Nurses.

In 1960 under the leadership of Catherine Hall (nurse) the College admitted men to membership, alongside nurses on the mental, mental subnormality, fever and children's nurses' registers. This meant the end of affiliation with the College, but not the end of the Society. 'I wanted to bring it to a close and for all of us to join the college together,' said John Andrews, nurse consultant for mental health in Redbridge and Waltham Forest. 'But the College was not happy to have people come in in bulk and not all society members wanted to join, so it continued under John Mason.' In 1960 about sixty men joined the College, but many remained with the Society and their existing memberships of trade unions. Male mental health and learning disability nurses were likely to be members of the Confederation of Health Service Employees which had formed in 1946 from an amalgamation of smaller health unions, representing nurses excluded from College membership.

In 1966 the Society of Registered Male Nurses Ltd. changed its name to the Society of Male Nurses Ltd. Membership was open to all male trained nurses, enrolled nurses and registered fever nurses or those who held the 'BTA' certificate of the British Thoracic Association, the orthopaedic nursing certificate or the ophthalmic nursing diploma.

The Society disbanded after a decision taken at the Emergency General Meeting of 21 October 1967 and ceased to exist in 1969.

== Notable members ==
- John Brander, the first Chair of the Society and the medical superintendent at Friern Hospital
- Fred A W Craddock MBE, Chair, Secretary and President of the Society, General Nursing Council Member, and Nurse Tutor at St Bernard's Hospital, Southall
- Edward J Glavin, Society founder, first Secretary of the Society and mental health nurse at Friern Hospital, New Southgate
- John Greene (nurse)
- Stanley Holder
- Thomas Horder, 1st Baron Horder was the Society's President.
- Freddy Mace
- John McNamara, senior tutor East Birmingham Hospital 1978-1984
- Christopher Oldfield Chair of the Society and North Nottingham Nursing Officer, also Queen's Nursing Institute Council Member 1958-1961
- John Sawyer MBE, Society Secretary, Chair and Editor of The Male Nurses Journal. He was the Nurse Tutor at Hackney Hospital and author of Aids to Male Genito-urinary Nursing (Bailliere Tindall and Cox)
- JE Southwell, the first Chair of the Society and a member of the General Nursing Council
