= Mary Uprichard =

Nurse and midwife from Northern Ireland

- Born: March 1938 (age 87–88)
- Occupation: Nurse

Dame Mary Elizabeth Uprichard, DBE, FRCM (born March 1938) is a British nursing, midwifery and health care activist. She was made Dame Commander of the Order of the British Empire in 1998.

She lives in Moira, County Down.

== Positions ==
- First President of the United Kingdom Central Council for Nursing, Midwifery and Health Visiting (1989-)
- Vice-President of the Royal College of Midwives (RCM)
- Chair of the Nurses' Professional Conduct Committee
- Lay Secretary (until 2011) on the Board of Governors of Methodist College, Belfast

== Publications ==
- The Evolution of Midwifery Training (Midwives Chronicle: January 1987;)
- Myles textbook for midwives, Myles, Bennett, Brown & Uprichard (eds), (Churchill Livingstone Publishing, 1993; ISBN 0-443-06392-3)

== Legacies ==
- Dame Mary Uprichard Prize for Excellence in Midwifery Studies (Queen's University Belfast)
- Dame Mary Uprichard Annual Lecture

== See also ==
- Roman Catholic Diocese of Clogher
