= Donna Ockenden =

British midwife and activist

Donna Ockenden is a British midwife and community activist.

== Formal investigations ==
Ockenden was commissioned in 2016 by the then UK Secretary for Health and Social Care, Jeremy Hunt, to chair an independent review into maternity services at Shrewsbury and Telford Hospital NHS Trust. Initial findings of the Ockenden Review were reported in December 2020, with a final report published on 17 March 2022.

In May 2022, it was announced by NHS England that Ockenden would chair an independent review of maternity services at Nottingham University Hospitals NHS Trust (NUH). This review commenced at the beginning of September 2022 and concluded in June 2026. Ockenden was appointed as Chair of the independent review into maternity and neonatal services at LTHT and UHSx in March and April 2026.

== Awards ==
In February 2021, Ockenden was named as a Fellow of the Royal Society for the Encouragement of Arts, Manufacture and Commerce. The fellowship is awarded by the Royal Society of Arts (RSA), and is limited to individuals determined to have made outstanding achievements to social progress and development.

In July 2023, she was awarded an honorary Doctor of Letters from the University of West London for her achievements and expertise in UK maternity services. In September 2024, Donna was awarded an honorary Doctor of Science from the University of Chichester.

Ockenden is a patron of MASIC, a charity that supports birth injured mothers and seeks to raise awareness of the life changing effects of Obstetric Anal Sphincter Injuries (OASI's), and an ambassador for baby loss charity Sands, Footprints Baby Loss, and Mama Academy.

== Life ==
From 2013 to 2017 Ockenden was first clinical director of midwifery, jointly with a clinical co-director of Obstetrics, at the London Strategic Clinical Network at NHS England. In 2015 the Nursing and Midwifery Council also appointed her as a Senior Midwifery Adviser in chief to the Chief Executive.

Ockenden lives in Chichester. In January 2016 she and her daughters founded The Four Streets Project, a charity to support Chichester's homeless population. She also started the Community Coat Rack, which gives free coats to those in need in the winter. Chichester District Council gave Ockenden a civic award in February 2019.

In 2022, Ockenden was named in the Vogue 25 'honouring the women shaping and remaking Britain in 2022'. Also in 2022, Ockenden was named in the HSJ Top 100 Healthcare Leaders across the UK.

In March 2025, Ockenden was the castaway on BBC Radio 4's Desert Island Discs, selecting "I Can See Clearly Now" by Hothouse Flowers, Jane Eyre by Charlotte Brontë, and some red lipstick as her chosen favourite song, book and luxury item respectively.
