= Shrewsbury and Telford Hospital NHS Trust =

NHS hospital trust

- Type: Large District General Teaching Hospital
- Established: 1 July 2003
- Headquarters: Mytton Oak Road; Shrewsbury; SY3 8XQ
- Region served: Shropshire, Telford and Wrekin, Powys
- Population: Over 550,000 (335,000 in Shropshire, and 192,000 in Telford & Wrekin)
- Hospitals: Royal Shrewsbury Hospital; Princess Royal Hospital; Community Diagnostic Centre, Hollinswood House, Telford; Community sites in Ludlow, Bridgnorth and Oswestry
- Chair: Andrew Morgan (Chair in Common of SaTH and Shropshire Community Health NHS Trust)
- Chief executive: Jo Williams (Group Chief Executive of SaTH and Shropshire Community Health NHS Trust)
- Staff: 8,000 Full Time Equivalents
- Website: www.sath.nhs.uk

Shrewsbury and Telford Hospital NHS Trust is the main provider of acute and specialist hospital services for Shropshire, Telford and Wrekin and Powys (mid-Wales). 99% of activity takes place at the Royal Shrewsbury Hospital and the Princess Royal Hospital in Telford which together have over 850 inpatient beds. The organisation also runs the Community Diagnostic Centre at Hollinswood House in Telford (diagnostics and renal dialysis services), as well as Oswestry Maternity Unit, the Wrekin Community Clinic, Euston House, Telford, and the Bridgnorth Community Hospital. It is one of a small number of English NHS Trusts which takes patients from across the border in Wales.

== History ==
As with many Trusts operating over multiple sites it has long been under pressure to concentrate services on fewer sites. In 2012, general and vascular surgery was successfully centralised at the Royal Shrewsbury Hospital. In 2014, consultant obstetrics and inpatients paediatrics was centralised at the Princess Royal Hospital. In November 2017 it was agreed that emergency services at Princess Royal Hospital should be downgraded and moved to Royal Shrewsbury Hospital. A large-scale programme of hospital reconfiguration in Shropshire called FutureFit has been in progress since 2013. In March 2018, the Department of Health and Social Care gave the go-ahead to more than £300 million worth of funding for the transformation of Shrewsbury and Telford Hospital NHS Trust. The plans went out to public consultation in May 2018. In January 2019 the plans to convert the accident and emergency department in Telford into an urgent care centre and turn the hospital into a planned care site were approved by the clinical commissioning group.

The trust was one of five in England to benefit from a five-year, £12.5m programme announced by Jeremy Hunt in July 2015 to bring in Virginia Mason Medical Center to assist English hospitals using their clinical engagement and culture tools including the Patient Safety Alert System and electronic dashboard. Hunt said "The achievements at Virginia Mason over the past decade are truly inspirational and I'm delighted they will now help NHS staff to learn the lessons that made their hospital one of the safest in the world – patients will see real benefits as a result."

== Facilities and services ==
The Trust's main service locations are the Princess Royal Hospital in Telford and the Royal Shrewsbury Hospital, which together provide 99% of its activity. Both hospitals provide a wide range of acute hospital services including accident & emergency, outpatients, diagnostics, inpatient medical care, trauma and orthopaedics and critical care. Currently inpatient general and vascular surgery is provided at the Royal Shrewsbury Hospital. In patients paediatrics, gynaecology and consultant-led obstetrics are provided from the Princess Royal Hospital Site. Alongside services at the Princess Royal Hospital, Telford and the Royal Shrewsbury Hospital, the Trust also provides community and outreach services such as Consultant-led outreach clinics (including the Wrekin Community Clinic at Euston House in Telford); Midwife-led units at Ludlow, Bridgnorth and Oswestry; Renal dialysis outreach services at Ludlow Hospital; Community services including midwifery, audiology and therapies.

The trust has long had difficulty running A&E services on both sites, and in October 2019 Matt Hancock authorised the controversial reorganisation. The emergency department in Telford will be downgraded to an urgent care centre, and all the emergency services will be transferred to Shrewsbury. In 2017, £312 million of national funding was allocated to facilitate the work involved. The outline case for the reconfiguration was finally approved in August 2022.

In May 2022 the daily operational costs of 1.3m per day put significant financial pressures on the trust who was also struggling to fill about 600 vacant staff positions.

== Performance ==
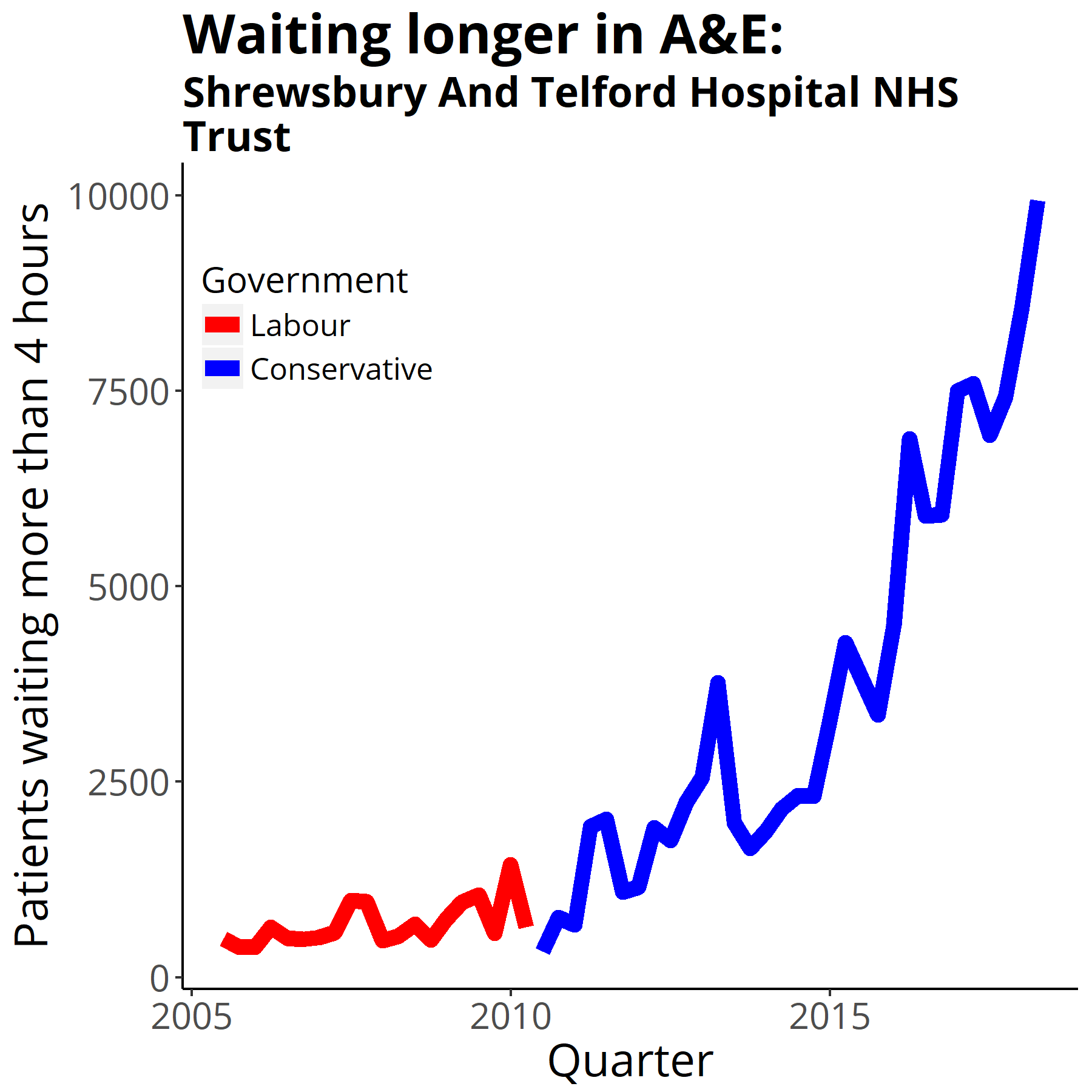
Four-hour target in the emergency department quarterly figures from NHS England Data from https://www.england.nhs.uk/statistics/statistical-work-areas/ae-waiting-times-and-activity/

The Shrewsbury and Telford Hospital was rated Requires Improvement by the Care Quality Commission. Medical care was rated as 'good' at both hospitals and the Trust was 'good' for caring and effectiveness, with inspectors saying they saw examples of good care on every ward and department they visited. The Trust is one of the best performing in the country against the 18-week target for planned care, waits for diagnostic tests and cancer treatment, but performance against the four-hour A&E waiting standard is among the worst, with hospital officials blaming the duplication of services across two small A&E departments for problems in staff recruitment.

The Trust was criticised in a report into the death of Kate Stanton-Davies, who was born in a midwifery led unit in Ludlow in March 2009.

The trust was one of 44 across Britain identified by the Care Quality Commission in 2013 as "high risk" for patients, although it was not among the 24 placed in the highest band of risk.

In January 2014 it was forced to look to the NHS Trust Development Authority for £4 million on the basis that the trust would be able to balance its budget by the end of March but Board member Dennis Jones said the bailout would not solve the underlying financial problems at the trust, which has been running at a loss over several years. In January 2017 it was reported that its financial troubles were such that its sandwich supplier refused to accept delayed payments.

The Trust did poorly in the 2015 cancer patient experience survey and has agreed to pair up with St George's University Hospitals NHS Foundation Trust, which did very well, in a scheme intended to "spread and accelerate innovative practice via peer to peer support and learning". It was singled out by the West Midlands Ambulance Service as one of two in the region responsible for the most serious delays in ambulance turn around times in 2016. In 2017-2018 only 74.6% of A&E patients were seen within four hours.

The Trust fared well in recent CQC surveys for Children and Young People's Inpatient experience and experiences of midwifery services.

There is concern over deaths or serious injuries to mothers and babies possibly due to poor care at a maternity unit. A Care Quality Commission inspection in the last week of August 2018 raised concerns about staff shortages and poor patient care. Urgent enforcement action is being taken. In the years to 2018 there have been six different inquiries into maternity care at the trust, one was by the Royal College of Obstetricians and Gynaecologists. In 2017 the Care Quality Commission rated the trust as one that "requires improvement". There were concerns over too few medical staff, not meeting the national target to admit, transfer or discharge 95% of patients within four hours after they arrive in A&E and ambulance handover times fell routinely below national standards.

The trust was put into special measures in November 2018 after a third warning from the Care Quality Commission over the safety of its services. The trust was rated inadequate which is the lowest rating. There is a culture of bullying where staff are reluctant to raise problems because they do not want to be labelled troublemakers. Medical care, surgery, critical care, end of life care all need improvement at both sites. Medical and nursing staff, "was not adequate to keep patients safe" specially at Telford. Staff felt they were not valued, supported or appreciated by senior staff. Not all the current management have the, "right skills and abilities" to provide "high-quality sustainable care". The trust has difficulty recruiting sufficient staff. The CQC told the trust to make sure there are enough qualified and trained staff in the hospitals in order to look after people and protect them from the risk of harm. It has also been told to, "review and improve midwifery staffing levels to meet the needs of women and keep women and babies safe". The Care Quality Commission is concerned about patients at risk of malnutrition, also bed sores not being assessed satisfactorily, too few children's doctors in its A&E units, and too few doctors and nurses generally. Prof Ted Baker of the Care Quality Commission said, "While we found staff to be caring and dedicated, there is clearly much work needed at the trust to ensure care is delivered in a way that ensures people are safe. We remain particularly concerned about the emergency department and maternity services at Shrewsbury and Telford Hospital NHS Trust."

A further warning notice was issues in December 2019 because of concerns about treatment of mental health patients in the emergency department. It was reported that "inappropriate" restraint techniques and rapid tranquillisation were being applied to mental health patients who were then left unsupervised in accident and emergency corridors.

In May 2022, Shrewsbury and Telford NHS Hospital Trust was fined £1,333,334 for failure of providing safe care to two patients at one of its hospitals. One of the charges had been brought by brought by the Care Quality Commission (CQC). The Trust was told at Telford Magistrates' Court that a previous fine against the Trust in 2016 and the "poor health and safety record in the management of" the Royal Shrewsbury Hospital had exacerbated the offences, but that the Trust's "full and extensive investigations immediately after both incidents" had been considered in mitigation.

=== Maternity scandal ===
Up to June 2019, 250 cases of concern in maternity were being investigated by an inquiry led by senior midwife Donna Ockenden commissioned in 2016 by Jeremy Hunt. On 24 June it was announced that another 300 cases had been uncovered, over a period of 40 years. In November 2019 it was revealed that at least 42 babies had died avoidably, also some mothers had died avoidably, there had been avoidable cases of brain damage and cerebral palsy among babies. Cases being investigated include 22 stillbirths, three deaths of pregnant women, 17 deaths of newborn babies, three maternal deaths, 47 examples of substandard care and 51 cases of cerebral palsy or brain damage. The interim report maintains the number of cases, "seems to represent a longstanding culture at this trust that is toxic to improvement effort".

== Maternity care and Ockenden Report ==
Up to June 2019, 250 cases of concern in maternity were being investigated by an enquiry led by senior midwife Donna Ockenden commissioned in 2016 by Jeremy Hunt. On 24 June it was announced that another 300 cases had been uncovered, over a period of 40 years. The interim report maintains the number of cases, "seems to represent a longstanding culture at this trust that is toxic to improvement effort".

In the aftermath of the final Ockenden Report published on 30 March 2022, which identified 60 areas for improvement and 201 avoidable stillbirths and neonatal deaths, concerns about maternity services at Shrewsbury and Telford Hospital NHS Trust (SaTH) continue to persist. As of October 2023, Shrewsbury-based law firm Lanyon Bowdler is representing 135 legal cases against the Trust, including recent cases from 2022 and 2023, related to allegations of poor maternity care.

Beth Heath, head of clinical negligence at Lanyon Bowdler, has reported that families are still experiencing preventable stillbirths, with two recent cases occurring within the past year. Heath also noted that many expectant mothers are choosing to seek care outside Shropshire due to a continuing lack of trust in local maternity services.

The Trust has reported progress in implementing the recommendations from the Ockenden Report. As of mid-2023, SaTH claimed to have completed 87% of the 52 actions from the first report and is continuing to work on the additional 158 actions from the final report. However, ongoing legal challenges and concerns from families suggest that significant issues with the Trust's maternity services remain unresolved.

== See also ==
- List of NHS trusts
