= Salmon Report =

1966 report on hospital nursing in England and Scotland

The Salmon Report (1966) or the Salmon Report on Senior Nursing Staff Structure was the report of a committee established to bring standardisation in structure and pay for senior hospital nurses in England and Scotland. The report recommended changes to how nurses jobs were categorised in hospitals and management training for nurses.

== Context ==
Following the creation of the National Health Service in 1948, there was confusion in how nursing was administered. The senior nurse in an organisation held the title of "matron", but there were wide differences in the amount of responsibility and the amount of pay they received: some matrons managed hospitals of only 20 beds, whilst others oversaw hospitals with hundreds.

Following extensive lobbying by the RCN and the Association of Hospital Matrons, Enoch Powell (Minister of Health for England and Wales from 1960 to 1963) and Michael Noble (Secretary of State for Scotland from 1962 to 1964) appointed a Committee "to advise on the senior nursing structure in the hospital (ward sister and above)".

== Committee ==
Brian Salmon, chair of J. Lyons and Co. and member of the governing body of Westminster Hospital, was chair. The appointed members included five nurses, two doctors, and three lay members. Notable matrons and chief male nurses involved included: Muriel Powell CBE (matron St. George's Hospital, London); Miss J T Locke OBE (matron the Victoria Infirmary, Glasgow); Eileen Rees, (matron Cardiff Royal Infirmary, Cardiff); Miss Grace Margery Westbrook, (matron Southmead Hospital, Bristol); John Greene, (Chief Male Nurse, Moorhaven Hospital, Ivybridge, South Devon). No practising nurses were members of the committee.

== Recommendations ==
The committee issued a report in 1966, with Salmon as author.

The report recommended a clearly defined hierarchy ranging from the clinical nurse (who would be Grade 5 or 6) up to the chief nursing officer (Grade 10). Each grade was defined by responsibilities and recommended selection and training. The title of "matron" was recommended to be replaced. The report advocated for management training for senior nurses.

== Impact ==
In 1966, Margaret Dorothy Green planned two of the first experimental first-line management courses for staff nurses and ward sisters as recommended by the report. Some of the nurses who had management training as a result of the Salmon Report took on management roles in the NHS from the 1970s.

As a result of Salmon, matrons and senior nurses had to reapply for their jobs and not all were successful in their applications. The report led to the loss of the job title "matron" from NHS hospitals.

Salmon had wanted implementation of the Report's recommendations to be gradual but in 1968, the Prices and Incomes Board examined nursing pay using Salmon grades and implemented the structure nationally. 80% of senior nurses had not received management training when they were placed.

There was confusion about the different grades established by the report, which was acknowledged by the follow-up Progress on Salmon in 1972. Many nurses, including editor of the Nursing Times Peggy Nuttall, were concerned that administrators would be favoured over clinical staff and instructors and dissatisfied with how middle management was to operate.

A committee investigated the structure of Local Authority nursing services to ensure that hospital and community nursing were aligned, publishing the Mayston Report in 1969.

The Salmon Report was followed by the creation of the National Nursing Staff Committee to investigate the training and role of nurses more broadly, which culminated in the Briggs Report of 1972. Briggs disagreed with the grading structure implemented by Salmon.

NHS reorganisation in 1974 significantly changed the structure of nursing and moved away from the Salmon structure.

== See also ==
- Cumberlege Report 1986
- Briggs Report 1972
- Mayston Report
- Platt Report 1964
