= Joint industrial council =

A joint industrial council (JIC) or national joint industrial council (NJIC), known as a Whitley council in some fields, especially white-collar and government, is a statutory council of employers and trade unions established in the United Kingdom and elsewhere. It is a workplace partnership, an institution that serves for a forum of consultation between employees and employers. Councils were established from 1919. They typically worked to determine wage rates, terms and conditions in a specific industry. There were dozens of JICs, one for each industry. Most JICs were established between the 1920s and the 1940s. The larger JICs also had regional councils throughout the country and some industries had separate JICs for England and Wales, Scotland and Northern Ireland. The Isle of Man had its own councils.

== Background ==
During World War I, in 1917, John Henry Whitley was appointed to chair a committee, which soon produced a Report on the Relations of Employers and Employees in the wake of the establishment of the Shop Stewards Movement and the widespread protest action against dilution. The smooth running of industry was vital to the war effort so maintaining good industrial relations was a priority.

He proposed a system of regular formal consultative meetings between workers and employers, known to this day as "Whitley councils". These would be empowered to cover any issue related to pay and conditions of service, and to take matters through to arbitration if necessary. This was a strong model which was to influence industrial relations in Canada, Australia and elsewhere.

The intention was to establish Whitley councils in the private sector, in particular in those industries most affected by the strike wave – to offset the demand for 'workers' control' – a demand which was rapidly gaining ground after the Russian revolution.

However, the councils failed to gain ground in coal, cotton, engineering and other heavy industries, but succeeded only in the sphere of government employment where they remain a major feature of public sector industrial relations to this day.

The Royal Institute of Public Administration commissioned Henry Parris, then of Durham University, to write a history of Whitleyism, published in 1973, to mark the 50th anniversary of the foundation of the National Whitley Council.

The Whitley council system was reviewed in detail by Lord McCarthy in 1976.

== Membership ==
Whitley councils comprise employee representatives, often referred to as the "staff side" and employer representatives, also known as the "official side".

== Constitution ==
Whitley councils usually have a formally agreed constitution. This typically includes:

- General objectives and functions – generally to "seek co-operation and agreement" on any matters appropriate to the level of jurisdiction of the committee, including, for example, pay, conditions of service, training, equality of opportunity, staff ideas, office accommodation, machinery, organisation, processes, procedures and policies.
- Membership – the composition of each side may be defined and limited in number, though it is normal that each side is responsible for deciding its membership. Often, either side may co-opt members to speak on specific areas of specialism.
- Officers – the senior executive of the official side is usually the chair and a representative of the staff side nominated as vice-chair. Each side may have a secretary who may or may not be a full member of the council. In the UK, Whitley councils at government departmental level may be chaired by the permanent secretary.
- Committees – the main committee may delegate responsibility to sub-committees e.g. to cover matters relating to pay and conditions of service, health and safety, etc.
- Decisions – sometimes a constitution will contain an explicit directive that decisions taken will be executed within a reasonable time frame.
- Disputes – sometimes the informal and formal stages of dispute resolution are specified.
- Meetings – frequency, location, agenda, quorum etc.
- Minutes – covering responsibility for drafting, agreeing, distributing and publishing minutes and the time scales for these.
- Finance and facilities – typically each side is responsible for its own expenses. The employer normally provides reasonable paid time to prepare for and attend meetings.
- Amendment – the manner in which amendments to the constitution can be made.

== Organisation ==
Whitley councils may be organised in a hierarchical manner, reflecting the structure of the employing organisation. For example, within the UK civil service, Whitley councils exist at local, workplace level, then at departmental level and ultimately at national level. In other institutions a geographic hierarchy (local, area, regional, national) may be followed.

=== National Health Service ===
Functional Whitley councils were established in the NHS in 1948 to negotiate pay.

In addition there was a Nurses and Midwives Whitley Council for Great Britain which negotiated conditions of service. It had 64 members, 41 for the staff side and 23 for the management side. The National Union of Public Employees and the Confederation of Health Service Employees each had four seats and the National Union of General and Municipal Workers had three. The Royal College of Nursing had twelve. It was not until 1963 that a practising nurse was elected Chair of this committee, with Grace Margery Westbrook 1963-1969.

In 1979 there were eight functional councils in the National Health Service covering all NHS staff, except doctors and dentists, and a few other NHS workers who negotiated directly with the health departments.

== See also ==
- UK labour law
- Agenda for Change, replacement system in NHS which came into effect on 1 December 2004.
- Codetermination
- Worker standards board
- Works council
