= Ockenden Review =

Investigation into UK maternity services failings

In 2017 Rhiannon Davies, her husband Richard and two other bereaved parents, Kayleigh and Colin Griffiths asked the UK health secretary, Jeremy Hunt, to set up a public inquiry into maternity services at Shrewsbury and Telford Hospital NHS Trust. Though Hunt did not establish a public inquiry, he ordered an independent review in April 2017. In May 2017 Donna Ockenden was appointed chair of the review, and it initially investigated 23 cases of potentially significant concern.

As the review uncovered wider evidence of maternity services failings at the trust, with over 60 cases needing investigation, Davies called on Hunt's successor, Matt Hancock, to widen the review's remit. By June 2019 hundreds of cases were under investigation. In November 2019 the leaked interim report confirmed Davies' worst fears and vindicated her efforts:

I couldn’t accept that we were the only people that this had happened to which is why we pushed for an investigation. But I am devastated that so many people have been treated in such a way and other families have suffered. How has this been tolerated for so long? It is horrific [...] It takes a massive toll to keep fighting. We have done it for Kate. There is a cultural problem nationally in maternity. We need to have a more grown-up conversation about the risks of pregnancy. No one ever wants to think about death in maternity.

When published in December 2020, the first Ockenden Report singled out the difference made by Davies, Stanton and two other bereaved parents, Kayleigh and Colin Griffiths:

The parent’s unrelenting commitment to ensuring their daughters’ lives were not lost in vain continues to be remarkable [...] In a void described by the families as ‘incomprehensible pain’, they undertook their own investigations to highlight the deaths of their newborn daughters, and to insist upon meaningful change in maternity services that could save other lives.

In the House of Commons, Jeremy Hunt also paid tribute to the achievement of the grieving families, for overcoming a 'blame culture' to expose NHS failings.

As a consequence there was an agreement that mothers should not be put under pressure to have a natural birth when a Caesarean section would be safer. However as James Titcombe and Nadine Montgomery pointed out, in the week the Ockenden report was published, NHS adverts were still producing messages that promote the role of midwives as ‘guardians of normal birth’. As Lady Hale said in her judgement on Montgomery's case: some obstetricians feel "that a vaginal delivery is in some way morally preferable to a caesarean section: so much so that it justifies depriving the pregnant woman of the information needed for her to make a free choice."

The final report of The Ockenden review was published in March 2022 with wide ranging Local Actions For Learning for the local Trust and 15 Immediate and Essential Actions for maternity services across England.
