= Briggs Report =

1972 report of Parliamentary Committee review of UK Nursing

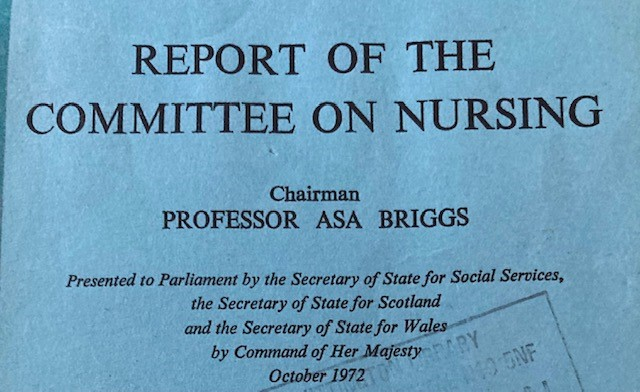
Briggs Report of the Committee on Nursing, presented to the UK Parliament in 1972

The Briggs Report (1972) was the Report of the Committee on Nursing in the United Kingdom, which reviewed the role of nurses and midwives in hospitals and in community care. It made recommendations on education, training, and professional regulation.

== Context ==
The Minister of Health set up a Committee on Senior Nursing Staff Structure in 1963, to bring standardisation of structure and pay for hospital nurses. The Committee, under Brian Salmon, issued a report in 1966 (now known as the Salmon Report), which recommended a hierarchy of nursing grades leading up to chief nursing officer.

In March 1970, at a time of pay disputes and nurses' strikes, another larger committee was established by Richard Crossman, Secretary of State and head of the Department of Health and Social Security, with the remit:

To review the role of the nurse and midwife in the hospital and community and the education and training required for that role, so that the best use is made of available manpower to meet present needs and the needs of the integrated health service.

This Committee on Nursing was expected to issue a report with wider-ranging recommendations for the future of nursing, midwifery and health visiting.

== Committee on Nursing ==
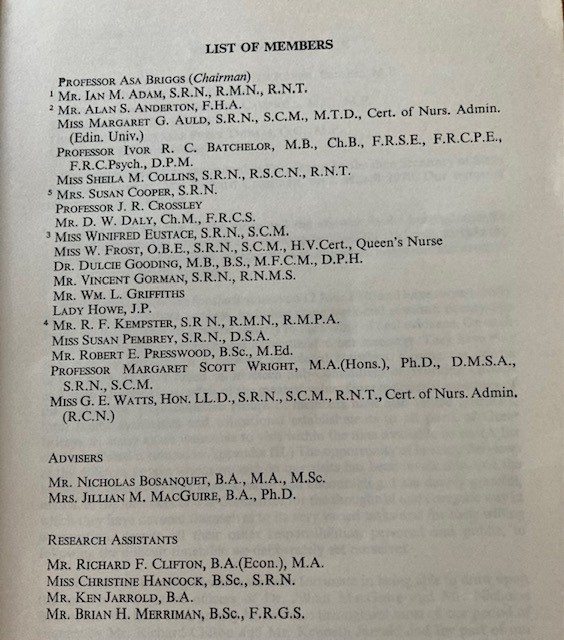
The membership of the Briggs Committee on Nursing 1972

The Committee on Nursing was headed by historian Asa Briggs. Other members of the committee included:

- Professor Margaret Scott-Wright, the first nursing professor in Europe,
- Royal College of Nursing members (and later Fellows) Sheila Collins, Susan Pembrey, and Margaret Auld.
- Mental health nurses Ian Adams and R. F. Kempster
- Professor Sir Ivor R. C. Batchelor, medic, and Professor Rodney Crossley, economist.
- Surgeon David W. Daly FRCS
- Ward sister Susan Cooper (who resigned in October 1970) and Winifred Eustace (who replaced Cooper in February 1971)
- Area nursing officer Miss W Frost OBE
- Public health expert Dr Dulcie Gooding
- Lady Howe
- Miss G. E. Watts matron of the Leeds General Infirmary

== Recommendations ==
In October 1972, the Committee on Nursing presented its report to Parliament. The Committee made 75 main recommendations.

=== Structural ===
The Briggs report suggested that a single statutory body, the Central Nursing and Midwifery Council, should oversee professional standards, education and discipline, rather than the three existing organisations, the General Nursing Council, the Central Midwives Board and the Council for the Training of Health Visitors. The structural changes recommended by the report were so complex that they were not accepted until 1974. They were not implemented until the United Kingdom Central Council for Nursing, Midwifery and Health Visiting (Electoral Scheme) Order of 1982.

=== Education ===
The Committee recommended reducing the age of entry to nursing training and offering an alternative form of training to the 2- or 3-year course in the form of 18 months training leading to certification, with the option to later pursue further training to obtain full registered nurse status. Another suggested change in education suggested dedicated nursing colleges be created and that student nurses not be treated as part of the ordinary labour force of the NHS.

=== Specialisms ===
The Report suggested that basic nurse education be followed by Branch specialisation, with trainee nurses choosing to select from adult, children, mental health and learning disability nursing specialisms. It recommended that a new professional group was required to work with the "mentally handicapped". In the mid-1970s, some areas began to introduce these specialist nurses.

=== Research ===
Nurse-led research was also recognised as of value by the report. It argued that "a sense of the need for research should become part of the mental equipment of every practicing nurse or midwife" although the number engaged in active research would be small.

== Impact ==
Recommendations from the Briggs Report were not implemented until 1979. when it formed the basis of the Midwives and Health Visitors Act (1979). It led to a move away from apprenticeship style training for nurses.

A Royal College of Nursing review written 50 years after the report called it a "breakthrough" that "set in train the first radical reform of nurse education since Nightingale."

The next overarching governmental review of nursing and midwifery was to be Front Line Care (Report) in 2010, thirty-eight years later.

== See also ==
- Cumberlege Report 1986
- Salmon Report 1966
- Platt Report 1964
- Front Line Care 2010
