= Platt Report 1964 =

1964 report on nurse education in England

The Platt Report (1964) or the Platt Report(s) on the Reform of Nursing Education was the report of Harry Platt upon the investigations of a committee established by the Royal College of Nursing (RCN). It made recommendations about how nurses should be educated and what prior qualifications should be required in order to begin nurse training in England.

== Context ==
By the 1960s, problems with recruitment of nurses to the National Health Service had been identified by studies, questionnaires, and job analyses. As many as 10,000 students failed to complete training and wastage rates were as high as 50 percent.

The RCN established a committee chaired by Platt to look at nursing education and suggest ways to reduce loss of staff during training or soon afterwards. Committee members included Annie Altschul, Barbara Fawkes, Catherine Hall, John Greene Grace Margery Westbrook and Winifred Hector.

== Recommendations ==
The Platt Report was published in 1964.

=== Entry requirements ===
The Platt Report proposed that to be accepted onto nurse training, people should have a minimum of five O-Levels.

=== Training requirements ===
The Platt Report stated that trainee nurses should receive two years of academic study and monitored clinical experience, followed by an exam, then another year of work in a hospital under supervision.

Nurse training had to cover general medicine and surgery, gynaecology, paediatrics, ear nose and throat medicine, ophthalmology and dermatology.

All nurse training schools were to have access to hospitals or groups of hospitals with 300 beds or more.

The Platt Report recommended that student nurses remained employees funded by Regional Health Authorities and paid a grant. It recommended different courses for state registered nurses (SRN) and state enrolled nurses (SEN), with a SEN required to complete two years' training and have their name on a roll and an SRN a three-year training programme and have their name on a professional register. Both would receive training grants.

== Impact ==
As Health Minister, Kenneth Robinson rejected suggestions from the Platt Report.

The General Nursing Council questioned the Report's "move away from a vocational ethos of nursing."

In 1969, the Welsh School of Medicine created a course that provided the first route to a degree in nursing.

== See also ==
- Cumberlege Report 1986
- Briggs Report 1972
- Salmon Report 1966
