= Nursing and Midwifery Council =

British healthcare regulator

- Logo
- Predecessor: United Kingdom Central Council for Nursing, Midwifery and Health Visiting and prior to that General Nursing Council
- Founded: 2001
- Headquarters: London, WC2; Offices in Edinburgh; Cardiff
- Location: United Kingdom
- Key people: Paul Rees, CEO
- Employees: 1,251 (2024/25)
- Website: nmc.org.uk

The Nursing and Midwifery Council (NMC) is the statutory regulator for nursing and midwifery professions in the UK. The NMC maintains a register of all nurses, midwives and specialist community public health nurses and nursing associates eligible to practise within the UK. It sets and reviews standards for their education, training and performances. The NMC also investigates allegations of impaired fitness to practise (i.e. where these standards are not met).

It has been a statutory body since 2002, with a stated aim to protect the health and well-being of the public. The NMC is also a charity registered with the Charity Commission, charity number 1091434 and in Scotland with the Office of the Scottish Charity Regulator, charity number SC038362. All Council members are trustees of the charity.

== History ==
The NMC predecessor were the General Nursing Council (GNC) for England and Wales established by the Nurses Registration Act 1919; which was succeeded in 1983 by the United Kingdom Central Council for Nursing, Midwifery and Health Visiting (UKCC) established by the Nurses, Midwives and Health Visitors Act 1979.

Both the GNC and UKCC were expected to maintain a register of UK nurses, midwives and health visitors, provide guidance to registrants, and handle professional misconduct complaints. They were also to approve training courses - monitoring the quality of nursing and midwifery education courses. Both used country based structures to help with this work.

=== Establishment of NMC ===
This structure of the UKCC survived with minor modifications up to April 2002, when the UKCC ceased to exist and its functions were taken over by a new Nursing and Midwifery Council (NMC). This was legislated for in the Parliament of the United Kingdom, through the Nursing and Midwifery Order 2001. The English National Board was also abolished and its quality assurance function was taken on board by the NMC. The other National Boards were also abolished, but new bodies were created in each country to take over their functions.

== Council ==
The NMC Council has two key roles: setting the strategic direction for the NMC and overseeing the work of senior NMC staff.

The Council ensures that the NMC complies with all relevant legislation, including the Nursing and Midwifery Order 2001 and the Charities Act 1993.

The Council is made up of twelve members: six lay people and six nurses or midwives, from England, Northern Ireland, Scotland and Wales, appointed by the Privy Council. Members are selected for their expertise in various fields and strategic experience; details of the Council members is published on the NMC website.

== Role ==
The NMC's role is to:

- protect the health and wellbeing of the public
- set standards of education, training, conduct and performance so that nurses and midwives can deliver high quality healthcare consistently throughout their careers
- ensure that nurses and midwives keep their skills and knowledge up to date and uphold the NMC's professional standards, and
- have clear and transparent processes to investigate nurses and midwives who fall short of the NMC's standards.

== Activities ==
The NMC has an annual income in excess of £52 million and employs over 1,200 staff. To fulfill the activities of the NMC it charges a registration fee to its members.

=== Education ===
The NMC set standards, guidance and requirements for nursing and midwifery education across the UK. These standards help to shape the content and design of programmes and state what a registered nurse or midwife needs to know and be able to do.

The NMC approves higher education institutions to deliver programmes. They currently accredit 1000 programmes in 79 education institutions across the UK.

When students successfully complete their programme, their education institution will let the NMC know that they have met the education and practice standards and are of good health and good character. If they are deemed fit to practise they will then be eligible to apply to join the register. Each year the NMC receives over 22,000 newly qualified nurses and midwives from education institutions.

=== Registering nurses and midwives ===
As of March 2025 there are 788,074 nurses and midwives on the NMC register, meaning the NMC is the body responsible for regulating the largest number of healthcare professionals in the UK. Nurses and midwives must be on the NMC register to practise in the UK. Anyone is able to search the NMC register.

=== Registering nursing associates ===
As of June 2019, there are 1,000 nursing associates on the NMC register.

=== Setting standards ===
The NMC's revised code became effective on 31 March 2015. The code contains professional standards of practice and behaviour that all nurses and midwives must keep to. Four key sections describe what nurses and midwives are expected to do: • prioritise people • practise effectively • preserve safety, and • promote professionalism and trust.

The Code was updated to reflect changes in healthcare and society since its last publication in 2008. The updates include new requirements on the fundamentals of care, the duty of candour, raising concerns and social media use.

The introduction to the code states: “When joining our register, and then renewing their registration, nurses and midwives commit to upholding these standards. This commitment to professional standards is fundamental to being part of a profession. We can take action if registered nurses or midwives fail to uphold the Code. In serious cases, this can include removing them from the register. The Code should be useful for everyone who cares about good nursing and midwifery.”

=== Revalidation ===
The NMC has committed to developing and implementing a system of revalidation. In October 2015, the NMC introduced the new system which all nurses and midwives in the UK must go through to remain on the NMC register. Nurses and midwives will need to renew their registration every three years and confirm that they continue to remain fit to practise by meeting the principles of the revised Code. They must demonstrate that they have completed the required hours of practice and learning activity through continuing professional development, have used feedback to review and improve the way they work, and have received confirmation from someone well placed to comment on their continuing fitness to practise.

The NMC ran a public consultation from January to March 2014 on how revalidation can be applied in practice. Pilots involving over 2,000 nurses and midwives across the UK would inform the final plans. Revalidation for nurses and midwives will start on 1 April 2016, with approximately 16,000 nurses and midwives going through the process initially. All nurses on the NMC register will eventually go through revalidation when their registration is up for renewal. In January 2016, the NMC launched a microsite to assist nurses and midwives through the revalidation process.

=== Managing complaints about nurses and midwives ===
The NMC handles complaints made about nurses and midwives, and investigates allegations where appropriate. The NMC has the power to restrict a nurse or midwife's practice or strike them off their register.

The NMC produced guidance for nurses and midwives on raising concerns which aims to help them take action in the public interest when needed. It includes information on legislation that offers protection to whistleblowers and information on organisations nurses and midwives can go to for further advice.

Helene Donnelly, ambassador for cultural change at Staffordshire and Stoke-on-Trent Partnership NHS Trust, spoke to NMC Council about raising concerns and gave her support to the guidance.

== Legislation ==
=== Changes to healthcare regulation ===
On 2 April 2014, the Law Commission published its draft bill, Regulation of Health and Social Care Professionals. The bill aims "to sweep away the out-dated and inflexible decision-making processes associated with the current legislation." The bill would give healthcare regulators in the UK more autonomy.

The NMC's Chief Executive and Registrar Jackie Smith welcomed the publication of the draft bill, but stated how the NMC needs the bill to become law quickly if it is able to modernise and become an efficient regulator. In its current legislative framework, the NMC spends nearly 80% of its income of fitness to practise hearings.

=== Affecting regulation of professionals within the EU ===
The revised Mutual Recognition of Professional Qualifications (MRPQ) Directive, which came into effect on 19 January 2016, brought in a number of changes that aimed to further facilitate the free movement of professionals within the EU, including amendments to language controls. The changes will enable the NMC to ensure, on a case-by-case basis, that a nurse or midwife from the EU has sufficient knowledge and command of English to practise safely and effectively.

== Criticism ==
=== Accusations of bullying and racism ===
On 11 March 2008 two Members of Parliament, Jim Devine and John Smith, made accusations in the House of Commons of bullying and racism within the NMC. The accusations have been denied by the NMC. The government set up an independent inquiry asking the Council for Healthcare Regulatory Excellence and the Charity Commission to investigate.

The NMC have been accused of nepotism by its members, Nursing Standard, letters-2017. Due to senior members of the NMC also being the instigating officer in cases against nurses, belonging to the same NHS Trust. In one instance a nurse was struck off for a data issue; whereas another nurse witnessed assaulting patients was only suspended for one year. (BFNHST, 2017).

In July 2024 an independent review of the NMC's culture highlighted safeguarding concerns, and found that people working in the organisation have experienced racism, discrimination and bullying. Their new chief executive resigned after four days in post. In their response, the governing council of the NMC apologised to those who had experienced racism, discrimination and bullying.

=== Panorama controversy ===
On 16 April 2009, nurse Margaret Haywood was barred from practising as a Nurse in the UK following a ruling by the NMC Conduct and Competence committee panel. This followed Haywood's contribution to a BBC Panorama television programme, exposing significant deficiencies in care at the Royal Sussex County Hospital, an acute teaching hospital in Brighton, England. The public and media response was generally antagonistic towards the NMC, the response being described by the Royal College of Nursing as 'unduly harsh'. On 12 October 2009, the striking off order was dropped, and replaced with a one-year caution.

=== Regulatory criticism ===
In an early July 2012 report, the Council for Healthcare Regulatory Excellence (CHRE), now known as the Professional Standards Authority for Health and Social Care (PSA), critically examined the leadership of the Nursing and Midwifery Council. In late July 2012, a new chair for the NMC, Mark Addison, was appointed by the privy council, an appointment which was subject to criticism by the NMC Council, who described their "grave concern" with regard to what they claimed was a "lack of an open, transparent and equal opportunities process" in regards to the appointment. In contrast, the CHRE stated that they were pleased with the appointment of a new chair, and that they would "look forward to working with Mark Addison". On 26 June 2015, the PSA reported in their performance review 2014–2015 report that the NMC had made overall improvements in their performance.

Between 2018 and 2026 18 nurses and midwives died by suicide while going through its fitness-to-practise process. Investigations can take years. In 2024 74% of cases were resolved within 15 months. According to the Professional Standards Authority it met only nine of the 18 Standards of Good Regulation and just two of the five standards covering fitness to practise.

=== Data loss ===
In March 2013 the NMC was fined £150,000 by the Information Commissioner's Office after it admitted that personal data, including "highly sensitive" information about nurses and about vulnerable children, had been placed on DVD without being encrypted, sent by courier and then lost. The ICO said that "it should have been obvious ... that such a contravention would be of a kind likely to cause substantial distress to the data subjects due to the nature of the data involved".

=== Increase in membership cost ===
The cost charged to remain registered on the NMC has increased from £76 per year in 2013, to £100 in 2014. Since 2015 the registration fee is £120. The fee will rise to £143 from 1 October 2026, subject to Parliamentary approval. The annual registration fee to the NMC is an allowable expense for UK income tax, however a survey by the NMC discovered that more than 75 per cent of NMC registrants do not claim tax relief on their registration.

=== Morecambe Bay ===
The council was criticised by Bill Kirkup for the way it handled the investigation resulting from events at University Hospitals of Morecambe Bay NHS Foundation Trust relating to misconduct by two midwives involved in the Furness General Hospital scandal. He said their response to his report had "fallen far short of expectations". The Professional Standards Authority said the regulator's investigation was "deficient" because evidence was not presented to the panel by the council, even though it had it in its possession. In 2018 the authority reported that the council had ignored more than 20 concerns raised by Cumbria police in 2012 for two years and that its handling of complaints was “frequently incompetent”. There was poor behaviour by staff towards families, reluctance to take concerns seriously and a lack of openness about mistakes it had made. The chief executive, Jackie Smith, resigned.

=== English language test ===
As at 2021 the basic requirement was the UKVI Academics ILETS 7.0 for reading, listening, and speaking and 6.5 for writing or UKVI general ILETS 4.0 & OET Grade B.

The process of registering nurses from abroad includes an English language test which has been criticised as too difficult. According to Sir Andrew Foster, “There are thousands of nurses, who came to the UK in the early 2000s and after, who had qualified as nurses in India but can’t get registration here because they have not passed the language test.” Peter Mount, former chair of Manchester University NHS Foundation Trust said the language requirements were to ensure patient safety, although when questioned but NMC have no evidence of fitness to practise cases being brought against overseas nurses related to language weakness. "I am aware of nurses who have taken these language tests over 10 times and have been living and working in care and health settings in [the] UK for over 10 years.-- The test is said to be discriminatory because it demands an academic standard of reading and writing that many native English speakers could not meet. This means at least 3,000 qualified nurses from India who are already in the UK are not on the register, and so are paid less for similar work. British applicants generally are only required to have Grade C GCSE. In September 2022, after a consultation exercise, the Council agreed to changes which were intended to slightly relax the testing procedures.

== Regulator ==
The Professional Standards Authority for Health and Social Care (PSA), is an independent body accountable to the UK Parliament, which promotes the health and wellbeing of the public and oversees the nine UK healthcare regulators, including the Nursing and Midwifery Council.

In 2015 it was suggested that the costs of regulating the Nursing and Midwifery Council would be paid for by the membership of the NMC i.e. nurses and midwives.

In 2015 the PSA published the 2014 audit it had undertaken of the NMC which found that whilst it had improved, it was still failing in areas.

== See also ==
- General Nursing Council
- United Kingdom Central Council for Nursing, Midwifery and Health Visiting
- Nursing in the United Kingdom
- History of nursing in the United Kingdom
- List of nursing organisations in the United Kingdom
- Royal College of Nursing
- Royal College of Midwives
- Maternity in the United Kingdom
