= Cumberland Infirmary =

- North Cumbria Integrated Care NHS Foundation Trust
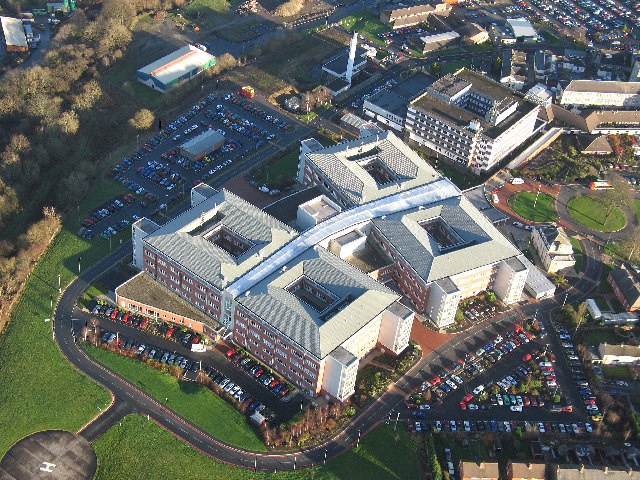

- Shown in Cumbria

Geography
- Location: Newtown Road, Carlisle, Cumbria, England
- Coordinates: 54.896515°N 2.957736°W

Organisation
- Care system: National Health Service
- Type: District General
- Affiliated university: Newcastle University Medical School; University of Central Lancashire

Services
- Emergency department: Yes

History
- Founded: 1832

Links
- Website: www.ncic.nhs.uk/locations/cumberland-infirmary

Cumberland Infirmary is a hospital in Carlisle, Cumbria, England. It is managed by the North Cumbria Integrated Care NHS Foundation Trust.

== History ==
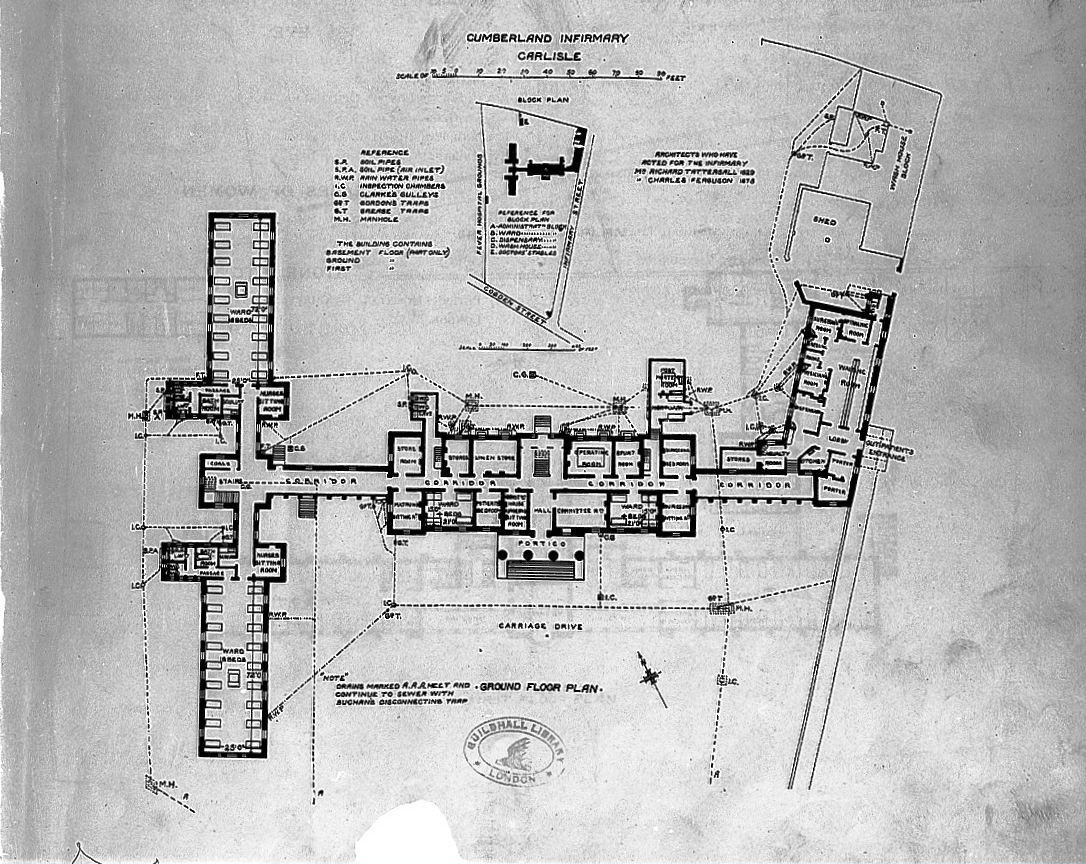
Cumberland Royal Infirmary Plan from 1893

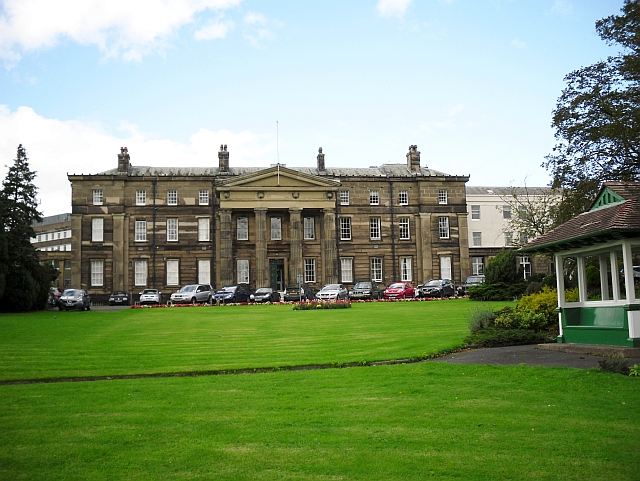
The original Cumberland Infirmary

The original Cumberland Infirmary is a Grade II* listed building which was designed by Richard Tattersall and constructed by Messrs Robinson and Bennet, contractors of Preston, between 1830 and 1832. A new wing was opened by the Countess of Lonsdale in October 1911. The founder of the Roper-Logan-Tierney nursing process, Nancy Roper, worked as senior nurse tutor at the hospital in the 1950s. A further extension was opened by Princess Anne in 1975.

The present Cumberland Infirmary was procured under a Private Finance Initiative contract in 1997, the first hospital to be bond financed. Health Management (Carlisle) plc, a 50/50 dedicated joint venture company formed by AMEC and Interserve (Facilities Management) Ltd was given a 45-year concession period. The hospital, which was built by AMEC, cost £65m to construct.

The new hospital consolidating the operations of three previous hospitals, namely the previous Cumberland Infirmary, the Carlisle City General Hospital and the Carlisle City Maternity Hospital. The hospital was officially opened by British Prime Minister Tony Blair, on 16 June 2000.

In 2015 a report commissioned by North Cumbria University Hospitals NHS Trust found that the fire proofing materials installed did not meet the required protection standard to allow for safe evacuation and prevent a fire from spreading across the building. It was described by the secretary of Cumbria’s Fire Brigades Union as "one of Carlisle’s biggest fire risks". The Trust said that this was not the first time they had uncovered major flaws in the PFI scheme.

In 2021, a new cancer centre was opened on the site, with services transitioning to Newcastle upon Tyne Hospitals NHS Foundation Trust.

== Notable staff ==
- Emily 'Margaret' Cummins, R.R.C. (1866-1934). Cummins trained at The London Hospital under Eva Luckes. In 1903 she was appointed as matron of Cumberland Infirmary in Carlisle. In 1911 she left following her appointment as matron of the Liverpool Royal Infirmary.

== Incidents ==
On 2 June 2010, the hospital's Accident and Emergency department was put on full incident standby in the aftermath of the Cumbria shootings.

== See also ==
- Grade II* listed buildings in Cumberland
- Listed buildings in Carlisle, Cumbria
- Healthcare in Cumbria
- List of hospitals in England
