= Nancy Roper =

British nurse theorist, lexicographer and creator

- Born: 29 September 1918; Wetheral, near Carlisle, England, United Kingdom of Great Britain and Ireland
- Died: 5 October 2004 (aged 86); Edinburgh, Scotland, United Kingdom
- Education: MPhil University of Edinburgh; Sister Tutor University of London; SRN Leeds General Infirmary
- Occupations: nurse theorist and lexicographer
- Known for: Roper-Logan-Tierney model of nursing

Nancy Roper (1918–2004) was a British nurse theorist, lexicographer and creator with Winifred W. Logan and Alison J. Tierney of the Roper–Logan–Tierney model of nursing used widely in nurse training in the United Kingdom, USA and Europe, since mid-1970s.

== Life and early career ==
Nancy Roper was born on 29 September 1918, at Wetheral, near Carlisle, England, her mother was a nanny. Roper had wanted to be a nurse as a child. Her initial training was as a registered sick children's nurse (gaining a gold medal at Booth Hall Hospital, Manchester).

After this she trained as a state registered (adult) nurse in 1943, winning student nurse medals at Leeds General Infirmary. Roper was called up to the Territorial Army as a nurse tutor, in World War II, at a time when teaching was a reserved occupation. Her next role was as a teaching staff nurse, and then senior tutor at Cumberland Infirmary, Carlisle, following completing a sister tutor diploma from London University in 1950.

== Later career ==
Roper was invited to join the Royal College of Nursing study tour in Belgium in 1954. She became an Examiner for the General Nursing Council. She also worked on updating the Oakes Dictionary for Nurses, which was published in 1961. From 1964, Roper was a self-employed lexicographer and author.

Roper won a British Commonwealth Nurses War Memorial Fellowship to study for MPhil at the University of Edinburgh, graduating in 1970. Her international studies in nurse education also included USA and Canada. Her practical and theoretical question was simply 'What is nursing?' which led to a thesis on 'Clinical Experience in Nurse Education' and identified that most nursing skills and interventions related to daily activities of patients. Roper proposed the first organised approach to nurse care planning, which was researched and refined to become a model of Activities of Living (and known as Roper–Logan–Tierney model of nursing).

Roper was (from 1974 to 1978) the first nursing research officer for the Scottish Home and Health Department, working with the Chief Scientist, and carried out assignments for the World Health Organisation (WHO) European Office. The collaboration with Tierney and Logan continued with the writing of the Elements of Nursing in 1980. Roper wrote in the British Journal of Nursing in 2002, that as early as when a student nurse she was not happy that rotating wards for different experiences was useful, as there were 'more similarities than differences in nursing patients with different conditions'. The British Journal of Nursing (BJN) Lifetime Achievement Award was given to Roper in 2003, at the Savoy in London. Meeting Roper at the event, BJN editor, Helen Scott said that Roper was "affectionate, open, caring.. mischievous sense of humour' and put people at ease. And Scott reported that in her acceptance speech, Roper said she was 'humbled by the work that practical nurses carry out on a daily basis'.

== Roper's model of nursing ==
Roper’s model of nursing, researched with Tierney and Logan, was originally published in 1976, and revised in 1985 and 1990, and 1998, and it remains the widely-used model of nursing used in the United Kingdom. It is now used as framework for nursing in America and on the continent of Europe with a history of being used particularly well in medical and surgical settings. Nursing methods developed from the activities of living and enhanced for use in a wider range of care settings, include for managing care in the community. A model of activities of daily living was later extended to cover Instrumental Activities of Daily Living for assessing ageing or disabled people's capability to live independently self-managing finances, domestic chores, socialising and communications.

Roper's approach was more holistic as well as practical and reminded the nurse to look at the whole patient's needs, their capabilities and their past, present and future experiences.

"The Roper-Logan-Tierney model is based upon activities of living, which evolved from the work of Virginia Henderson in 1966. The activities of daily living are the key to the model of care which seeks to define “what living means:”

- maintaining a safe environment
- communication
- breathing
- eating and drinking
- elimination
- washing and dressing
- temperature control
- mobilization
- working and playing
- expressing sexuality
- sleeping
- death and dying

The factors that influence activities of living are biological, psychological, sociocultural, environmental, and politicoeconomic. These factors make the model holistic, and if they are not included in assessment, it will be both incomplete and flawed."

== Death and legacy ==
Roper died in Edinburgh 5 October 2004, and tributes were paid in nursing and general publications. However both the Nursing Times said she had 'influenced generations of nurses' and the British Journal of Nursing also noted that Roper received neither a state honour nor a Royal College of Nursing fellowship. The nursing process model her research developed had by then been used in research on the computerisation of nursing care management information:

- "To record nursing care rapidly, clearly and concisely using the precepts of the nursing process.
- To acquire accurate information to plan and implement nursing care."

In her obituary, a lecturer in nurse education, John Adams, said in The Independent, that Roper was both innovative and practical:

'When I was a student 30 years ago I would have found her list of activities very helpful. It is difficult to realise it now, but then there was no recognised framework. So you somehow had to remember everything from scratch. The very simplicity of the model helps to explain its universal usefulness.'

And in her obituary the Nursing Standard recognised the longevity of her contribution:

"Nancy Roper was a theorist whose influence on nursing is worldwide. For 50 years her research provided the framework for adult nursing. She had shown no inclination to retire and recently made a powerful intervention at a conference in Edinburgh."

The Royal College of Nursing executive director, Alison Kitson said: ‘Nancy was an inspiration to her profession. She combined clear thinking with compassion and has left a treasured legacy through her work around activities of daily living in nursing.’

In 2026 a plaque commemorating Nancy Roper was placed on the Pillars Building of the Cumberland Infirmary by the Carlisle & District Civic Trust, Cumberland Infirmary Nurses’ League, and North Cumbria Integrated Care NHS Foundation Trust.

== See also ==
- Alison J. Tierney
- Roper-Logan-Tierney model of nursing
- Activities of Daily Living
- Nursing Theory

== Recent publications ==
- The Roper-Logan-Tierney Model of Nursing: Based on Activities of Living, 2000.
- Elements of Nursing: A Model for Nursing Based on A Model of Living, 1996 (4th ed.)
- New American Pocket Medical Dictionary, 1988.
- Principles of Nursing in Process Context, 1988.
- Principles of Nursing, 1982.
- Learning to Use the Process of Nursing, 1981.
