= Healthcare in Cumbria =

Healthcare in Cumbria was the responsibility of Cumbria Clinical Commissioning Group until July 2022. On 1 April 2017 32 GP practices left the CCG and merged with Lancashire North CCG to form Morecambe Bay CCG.

== History ==
From 1947 to 1974 NHS services in Cumbria (which did not then exist) were managed by Newcastle Regional Hospital Board which covered Cumberland, and the part of Westmorland covered by the Borough of Appleby and the North Westmorland Rural District and the Manchester Board which covered the remainder. In 1974 the boards were abolished and replaced by regional health authorities. The whole of the newly created Cumbria came under the Newcastle RHA. Regions were reorganised in 1996 and North Cumbria came under the Northern and Yorkshire Regional Health Authority. South Cumbria came under the North West (Mersey & North West) RHA. Cumbria from 1974 had three district health authorities South, East and West In 1993 South Cumbria was renamed Morecambe Bay District, which also included Lancaster. One Primary care trust was established covering the whole the county in 2002. It was managed by the North West Strategic Health Authority from 2002 until 2013.

Cumbria CCG took on the responsibilities of the former PCT on 1 April 2013.

== Sustainability and transformation plan ==
There are two sustainability and transformation plans for the county, one for West, North and East Cumbria, and one for Lancashire and South Cumbria. In March 2016 Amanda Doyle, Chief Clinical Officer of Blackpool Clinical Commissioning Group was appointed the leader of the Lancashire and South Cumbria Sustainability and transformation plan footprint.

The West, North and East Cumbria plan was more advanced than most as it had been built on the Success Regime project. The area served by the Cumberland Infirmary (Carlisle) and the West Cumberland Hospital (Whitehaven) was identified in June 2015 as one of the three Success Regime projects in England. A consultation which started in December 2016 considered:
4 options to maintain, reduce or remove maternity services at the West Cumberland.
The movement of some or all children's services from the West Cumberland Hospital to the Cumberland Infirmary
The establishment of a hyper-acute stroke unit at the Cumberland Infirmary
Various options to reduce the number of in-patient beds at community hospitals.
One of the decisions, to retain consultant-led maternity care in Whitehaven and establish an alongside midwife led unit was ratified by the CCG in July 2019 after a study chaired by Bill Kirkup commissioned as part of the CCG's March 2017 decision to continue with the service.

Also in March 2017, it was agreed to reduce the number of community hospitals in-patient beds and develop more care at home.

The proposed merger of North Cumbria University Hospitals with Northumbria Healthcare Foundation Trust was abandoned in April 2017. North Cumbria University Hospitals and Cumbria Partnership now work in a collaborative venture, with board members having positions with both trusts. This started with the same chief executive taking charge of both trusts in September 2017.

In April 2018 it emerged that there were proposals to merge the STP for Northumberland, Tyne, and Wear with those for North Cumbria and Darlington, Teesside, Hambleton, Richmondshire, and Whitby; this would create the largest STP in the country with a population of 3.2 million. North Tees and Hartlepool NHS Foundation Trust chief executive Alan Foster was made lead for all three STPs in October 2017. The 12 CCGs involved have set up a joint commissioning committee with delegated decision-making powers.

The West, North and East Cumbria sustainability and transformation partnership was one of four new integrated care systems established by NHS England in May 2018.

== Public health ==
Suicide rates in the county are very high. In 2010-12, Copeland had the second-highest suicide rate in England, 15.5 per 100,000 people. The average rate in England was eight people per 100,000. In 2013-4 Barrow saw 251 admissions for self-harm, a rate of 372.9 people per 100,000.

== Primary care ==
There are 82 GP practices in the county. Out-of-hours services are provided by Cumbria Health on Call. Rent-free accommodation for GP trainees is provided in Workington by Allerdale Borough Council and Impact Housing. Because of difficulties accessing secondary care, GPs are supported by the practice and community to manage more complex conditions within primary care than in more urban areas.

A not-for-profit grouping of GP practices has been set up in West and North Cumbria to try and solve the problems of providing primary care in the region. North Cumbria Primary Care Alliance comprises 7 practices working out of 18 locations. They have 103,000 patients registered, about a third of the population in the area served by North Cumbria Integrated Care. The alliance centralises management costs, solves the asset problem of the premises owned by each practice, helps with recruitment and, with a larger staff base, can provide specialist GP or nurse support for long-term conditions by sharing resources across the alliance.

== Community care ==
Palliative care is provided by Hospice at Home West Cumbria, St Mary's Hospice, Ulverston and Eden Valley Hospice, in Carlisle which also runs Jigsaw, Cumbria's Children's Hospice. The governors of Cumbria Partnership NHS Foundation Trust accused the success regime in April 2016 of seeing services at their community services trust as “a cash cow to solve problems in the acute system” after it was suggested that inpatient beds at community hospitals could be focused on a smaller number of sites or developed as community hubs without inpatient facilities.

Healthwatch Cumbria is an organisation set up under the Health and Social Care Act 2012 to act as a voice for patients.

== NHS providers ==
Mental health services in the county are provided by North Cumbria Integrated Care NHS Foundation Trust. Acute hospital services are provided by North Cumbria Integrated Care NHS Foundation Trust and University Hospitals of Morecambe Bay NHS Foundation Trust though some specialist services are provided in Newcastle and Manchester. The North West Ambulance Service covers the county. The low density of population causes great difficulty in acute services. Hugh Reeve, Chair of Cumbria CCG expressed the problem: "If you put the world’s best obstetricians in Barrow, in five years’ time they’ll become deskilled because there isn’t enough work for them."

Cumbria was named one of the 11 most financially challenged health economies in England in 2014.

In February 2015 it was announced that the clinical commissioning groups planned for inpatient elective surgery at Westmorland General Hospital to be transferred to Royal Lancaster Infirmary and Furness General Hospital. Up to six GP practices will be brought together with community services in Barrow at a cost of £12m.

Lancashire North and Cumbria was one of the areas selected to pilot integrated primary and acute care systems under the Five Year Forward View in 2015.

North Cumbria was one of three areas proposed for the new "success regime" by Simon Stevens in June 2015 in which NHS England will work in partnership with Monitor and the NHS Trust Development Authority to tackle in the local health economy.

Cumbria Partnership NHS Foundation Trust merged with North Cumbria University Hospitals NHS Trust in October 2019. About 250 staff in south Cumbria transferred to Lancashire Care NHS Foundation Trust. Mental health services in the north of Cumbria were transferred to Northumberland, Tyne and Wear NHS Foundation Trust.

There are maternity units in Barrow, Whitehaven, Carlisle, Penrith, Kendal, and Lancaster. In November 2014 the CCG invited the Royal College of Obstetricians and Gynaecologists to conduct a review of maternity services in Cumbria and the Morecambe Bay area. The Furness General Hospital scandal dominated discussion of maternity services in the south of the county for several years.

== See also ==
- Category:Health in Cumbria
- Healthcare in the United Kingdom
