= Cumbria shootings =

2010 attack across parts of Cumbria, England

- The Eskdale valley, site of Bird's suicide
- Location: Copeland, Cumbria, England
- Date: 2 June 2010; 16 years ago c. 12:45 a.m. – 12:15 p.m. (BST)
- Attack type: Spree shooting, mass shooting, murder-suicide, fratricide, mass murder
- Weapons: Sawn-off George Fisher 12 gauge double-barreled shotgun; CZ 452-2E ZKM .22-calibre bolt-action rifle
- Deaths: 13 (including the perpetrator)
- Injuries: 11
- Perpetrator: Derrick Bird
- Motive: Inconclusive; see possible motives

On 2 June 2010, 52-year-old taxi driver Derrick Bird carried out a spree shooting across multiple parts of Cumbria, England, killed twelve people and injured eleven others. Along with the 1987 Hungerford massacre and the 1996 Dunblane school massacre, it is one of the worst criminal acts involving firearms in British history. The shootings ended when Bird killed himself in a wooded area after abandoning his car in the village of Boot.

The shootings began in mid-morning in Lamplugh and moved to Frizington, Whitehaven, Egremont, Gosforth, and Seascale, sparking a major manhunt by the Cumbria Constabulary, with assistance from Civil Nuclear Constabulary officers. Thirty crime scenes across Copeland were investigated.

Queen Elizabeth II paid tribute to the victims, and the Prince of Wales later visited Whitehaven in the wake of the tragedy. Prime Minister David Cameron and Home Secretary Theresa May also visited West Cumbria. A memorial fund was set up to aid victims and affected communities.

== Timeline ==
Locations of events during the 2010 Cumbria shootings
1 Derrick Bird leaves his home in Rowrah
2 Targeted killing of David Bird
3 Targeted killing of Kevin Commons
4 Targeted killing of Darren Rewcastle; random shootings begin
5 Spree shootings in Egremont (two killed)
6 Spree shootings in Wilton (two killed)
7 Random fatal shooting of Isaac Dixon
8 Random fatal shooting of Garry Purdham
9 Spree shootings in Seascale (three killed)
10 Spree shootings in Eskdale (no fatalities)
11 Final spree shooting in Boot, and Derrick Bird's suicide

=== Targeted shootings ===
In the early hours of Wednesday, 2 June 2010, Derrick Bird left his home in Rowrah, Cumbria, drove his 2006 Citroën Xsara Picasso taxi to his twin brother David's home in Lamplugh, and shot him eleven times in the head and body with a .22 calibre rifle, killing him. Four of those bullets exited David's body, causing a total of 15 entry or exit wounds.

Bird then drove to Frizington, arriving at the home of his family's solicitor, Kevin Commons. Bird prevented Commons from driving away by firing twice with a double-barrelled shotgun – which he had earlier sawn off (the barrel and a saw being later found at his home) – hitting him once in the shoulder. Commons staggered out of his car and into the entrance to his farmyard, where Bird killed him with two rifle shots to the head. Bird then moved towards Whitehaven. A witness called the Cumbria Constabulary to report the Commons shooting; her call was delayed by several minutes after she asked neighbours what she should do. She also erroneously described Bird as being armed with an air rifle despite being able to hear the gunshots.

After killing Commons, Bird went to a friend's house to retrieve a shotgun he had lent, but he was answered by the friend's wife, who did not have access to it. At 10:33, Bird drove to a taxi rank on Duke Street, Whitehaven. There, he called over Darren Rewcastle, another taxi driver; Bird had had conflicts with Rewcastle over his practice of poaching fares, and an incident where Rewcastle damaged the tyres on Bird's taxi and boasted about it. When Rewcastle approached Bird's taxi, he was shot twice at point-blank range with the rifle, hitting him in the lower face, chest, and abdomen. Rewcastle died of his injuries, the only person to die in Whitehaven during the attacks. After the shooting of Rewcastle, fellow taxi driver Richard Webster shouted at Bird who then sped off.

Soon after killing Rewcastle, Bird drove alongside another taxi driver, Donald Reid, and shot him in the back, wounding him. Bird then made a loop back to the taxi rank and fired twice at Reid as he waited for emergency personnel, missing him. Next, Bird drove away from the taxi rank and stopped alongside another taxi driver, Paul Wilson, as he walked down Scotch Street, and called him over to his vehicle as he did with Rewcastle; when Wilson answered his call, Bird shot him in the right side of his face with the sawn-off shotgun, severely wounding him. As a result of the shootings, unarmed officers at the local police station were informed and began following Bird's taxi as it drove onto Coach Road. There, Bird fired his shotgun at a passing taxi, injuring the male driver, Terry Kennedy, and the female passenger, Emma Percival. Bird was then able to flee the officers after he aimed his shotgun at two of them, forcing them to take cover. He did not fire, but instead took advantage of the officers' distraction to escape.

=== Random shootings ===
In the wake of the Whitehaven shootings, residents there and in the neighbouring towns of Egremont and Seascale were urged to stay indoors. A major manhunt for Bird was launched by the Cumbria Constabulary, which was assisted by armed Civil Nuclear Constabulary officers. Bird drove through several towns, firing apparently at random, and calling a majority of the victims over to his taxi before shooting them. Because of the first call which was mistakenly reported to be an air rifle, the response from Cumbria Constabulary was severely delayed. After following Bird, police vehicles and a member of the public's van (who an officer had got into with the driver) gave chase to Bird but they met a forked road and took the wrong direction, losing him.

Near Egremont, Bird tried to shoot Jacqueline Williamson as she walked her dog, but she managed to escape without injury. Upon arriving in Egremont, he stopped alongside Susan Hughes as she walked home from shopping, and shot her in the chest and abdomen with the shotgun. He then got out of his taxi and got into a struggle with Hughes before fatally shooting her in the back of the head with his rifle. Then, after driving a short distance to Bridge End, Bird fired the shotgun at Kenneth Fishburn as he walked in the opposite direction; Fishburn suffered fatal wounds to the head and chest. This was followed by the shooting of Leslie Hunter, who was called over to Bird's taxi before being shot in the face at close range with the shotgun, then a second time in the back after he turned away to protect himself. Hunter survived his injuries.

Bird then went south towards Thornhill, where he fired his shotgun at Ashley Glaister, a teenage girl; he missed her and she ran off back towards her sister's home. He then passed Carleton and travelled to the village of Wilton. There, he tried to visit Jason Carey, a member of a diving club Bird also belonged to, but left when Carey's wife came to the door. Bird then saw Jennifer Jackson walking down the road with her son; he shot Jackson once in the chest with his shotgun and twice in the head with his rifle, killing her. Bird then drove past Town Head Farm, but turned back towards it and fired his shotgun, fatally hitting Jackson's husband James in the head and wounding Christine Hunter-Hall in the back. Hunter-Hall survived the attack, and as of 2011 still had 100 pellets lodged in her lung. Bird then drove back to Carleton and killed Isaac Dixon, who was fatally shot twice at close range as he was talking to a farmer in a field. He then shot and killed Garry Purdham, a former professional rugby player, who was working in a field outside the Red Admiral Hotel at Boonwood, near Gosforth.

Bird then drove towards Seascale. Along the way, he began driving slowly and waved other motorists to pass him. He shot motorist Jamie Clark, who suffered a fatal wound to the head, although it was not clear at first whether he died from the gunshot or the subsequent car crash. Bird then encountered motorist Harry Berger at a narrow, one-way passage underneath a railway bridge. When Berger allowed Bird to enter first, Bird fired at him as he passed by, shooting him twice and causing severe injury to his right arm. Three armed response vehicles pursuing Bird were blocked out of the tunnel by Berger's vehicle; it had to be pushed away to let them pass.

Meanwhile, Bird had driven on to Drigg Road, where he fired twice at Michael Pike, a retired man who was cycling in front of him; the first shot missed, but the second hit Pike in the head and killed him. Seconds later, while on the same street, Bird fatally shot Jane Robinson in the neck and head at point-blank range after apparently calling her over.

After the killing of Robinson, witnesses described Bird as driving increasingly erratically down the street. At 11:33, Police Constables Phillip Lewis and Andrew Laverack spotted Bird as his car passed by their vehicle. They attempted to pursue him, but were delayed in roadworks and lost sight of him a minute later. Soon afterward Bird drove into Eskdale valley, where he wounded Jackie Lewis in the neck with his rifle as she was out walking. At this point, his route had become clearer to police. Next, Bird stopped alongside Fiona Moretta, who leaned into his passenger window, believing he was going to ask her for directions. Instead, he injured her in the chest with the rifle, then continued towards the village of Boot.

Arriving in Boot, Bird briefly stopped at a business premises called Sim's Travel and fired his rifle at nearby people, but missed. Continuing into the village, he continued firing at random people and missing. Bird fired his rifle at two men, hitting and severely wounding Nathan Jones in the face. This was shortly followed by a couple who had stopped their car to take a photo; Samantha Chrystie suffered severe wounds to the face from a rifle bullet. Chrystie's partner, Craig Ross, fled upon Bird's instruction and was then fired at, but escaped uninjured. Before shooting Chrystie, Bird asked her if she was "Having a nice day?"

=== Suspect's suicide ===
Shortly after firing at two cyclists, Bird crashed his taxi into several vehicles and a stone wall, damaging a tyre. A nearby family of four offered assistance to Bird, but were quickly turned down and advised to leave. Bird removed the rifle from his taxi and walked over a bridge leading into Oak How Woods. He was last seen alive at 12:30; shortly afterward, police confirmed that there had been fatalities and that they were searching for a suspect. Police later announced they were searching for the driver of a dark-grey Citroën Xsara Picasso driven by Bird. At around 12:36, armed police officers and dog handlers arrived at the scene of Bird's abandoned taxi and began a search in and around the wooded area.

At 14:00, Deputy Chief Constable Stuart Hyde announced that Bird's body had been found in a wooded area, along with a rifle. Police confirmed that members of the public who had taken shelter during the incident could now resume their normal activities.

During the manhunt, the gates of the nearby Sellafield nuclear reprocessing plant were closed as a precaution, and the afternoon shift was told not to come to work.

=== Aftermath ===
At 15:00, during his first session of Prime Minister's Questions, David Cameron confirmed that "at least five" people had died, including the gunman. Over the next few hours, Bird's shooting of his brother and solicitor was announced. Later that evening, a police press conference in Whitehaven announced that 12 people had been killed, that a further 11 people were injured, three of them critically, and that the suspect had killed himself. They also confirmed that two weapons (a sawn-off double-barrelled shotgun and a .22-calibre rifle with a scope and silencer) had been used by the suspect in the attacks, and that 30 crime scenes were being investigated. The shootings were the worst mass-casualty shooting incident to occur in the United Kingdom since the 1996 Dunblane school massacre, which left 18 people dead. A report later determined that Bird fired at least 47 rounds during the shootings (29 from his shotgun, and 18 from his .22 rifle). Six live .22 rounds were also found on Bird's person, with an additional eight loaded in the rifle. A search in Bird's home later recovered over 750 rounds of live .22 ammunition, 240 live shotgun cartridges and a large amount of financial paperwork.

The police stated that the shootings took place along a 24 kilometres (15 mi) stretch of the Cumbrian coastline. Helicopters from neighbouring police forces were used in the manhunt, and those from the RAF Search and Rescue Force, the Yorkshire Air Ambulance, and the Great North Air Ambulance responded to casualties. A major incident was declared by North Cumbria University Hospitals NHS Trust at West Cumberland Hospital, with the accident and emergency department at the Cumberland Infirmary, Carlisle, on full incident stand-by.

Bird had been a licensed firearms holder, and the incident sparked debate about further gun control in the United Kingdom; the previous 1996 Dunblane and 1987 Hungerford shootings had led to increased firearms controls.

== Victims ==
=== Fatalities ===
==== Targeted shootings ====
- David Bird, 52, killed at Lamplugh, gunman's twin brother.
- Kevin Commons, 60, killed at Frizington, gunman's family solicitor.
- Darren Rewcastle, 43, killed at Whitehaven, fellow taxi driver known to the gunman.

==== Random shootings ====
- Susan Hughes, 57, killed at Egremont.
- Kenneth Fishburn, 71, killed at Egremont.
- Jennifer Jackson, 68, killed at Wilton, wife of James Jackson.
- James Jackson, 67, killed at Wilton, husband of Jennifer Jackson.
- Isaac Dixon, 65, killed at Carleton.
- Garry Purdham, 31, killed at Gosforth, professional rugby league player.
- James "Jamie" Clark, 23, killed at Seascale.
- Michael Pike, 64, killed at Seascale.
- Jane Robinson, 66, killed at Seascale.

=== Injuries ===
- Donald Reid, 57
- Paul Wilson, 34
- Terry Kennedy, 53
- Emma Percival, 20
- Leslie Hunter, 59
- Christine Hunter-Hall, 43
- Harry Berger, 40
- Jacqueline Lewis, 70
- Fiona Moretta, 51
- Nathan Jones, 25
- Samantha Chrystie, 30

== Perpetrator ==
Derrick Bird (27 November 1957 – 2 June 2010) was born to Mary (née Sims) and Joseph Bird. He had a twin brother, David, and an older brother, Brian, who was six years older than Derrick and David. He lived alone in Rowrah, Cumbria, and had two sons with a woman from whom he had separated in the mid-1990s. He became a grandfather in May 2010, and was described as a quiet, popular man who worked as a self-employed taxi driver in Whitehaven.

Terry Kennedy, a fellow taxi driver who described himself as one of Bird's best friends, and was wounded by Bird, claimed that Bird had been in a relationship with a Thai girl or woman he met on holiday in Pattaya, Thailand. Another friend of Bird claimed that the "girlfriend" had ended their relationship via a text message after Bird had sent her £1,000, and that Bird had been "made a fool out of".

In 2007, Bird was beaten unconscious by four men who tried to run instead of paying him for taxi services. Friends said he changed after the attack. It was reported that Bird had previously sought help from a local hospital due to his fragile mental state, although these reports were unconfirmed. He had held a shotgun certificate since 1974 and had renewed it several times, most recently in 2005, and had held a firearms certificate for a rifle from 2007 onward. Bird was being investigated by HM Revenue and Customs at the time of the shooting. His body was formally identified at Furness General Hospital in Barrow-in-Furness, and he was cremated at a private service on 18 June 2010.

=== Possible motives ===
Bird may have had a grudge against people associated with the Sellafield nuclear power plant where he had worked as a joiner, resigning in 1990 following an allegation of theft of wood from the plant. He was convicted and given a twelve-month suspended sentence. Three of the dead were former plant employees, although there is no evidence that any were involved with his resignation.

Bird may have had a family dispute over his father's will after his death in 1998. Speculation heightened when it was revealed that he had killed both his twin, David, and the family's solicitor, Kevin Commons.

Bird was subject to an ongoing investigation by HM Revenue and Customs for tax evasion. According to Mark Cooper, a fellow taxi driver who had known him for fifteen years, Bird had accumulated £60,000 in a secret bank account. He reportedly believed his brother and the solicitor were conspiring to have him imprisoned for tax evasion; Bird called his brother forty-four times in the three days before the killings.

== Reactions ==
=== Official responses and visits ===
Prime Minister David Cameron was joined by several other MPs in expressing the House of Commons members' shock and horror at the events during Prime Minister's Questions. Home Secretary Theresa May expressed her regret at the deaths and paid tribute to the response of the emergency services. The Cabinet met to discuss the shootings and May later made a statement on the Cumbria incident to the House of Commons on 3 June 2010. Cameron and May visited the affected region on 4 June 2010 to meet victims, officials and local people. Jamie Reed, the MP for Copeland, called the incident the "blackest day in our community's history".

On the evening of 2 June, Queen Elizabeth II said she was "deeply shocked" by the shootings and shared the nation's "grief and horror". Prince Charles visited Whitehaven on 11 June 2010 to meet members of the community affected by the tragedy.

=== In popular culture ===
BBC One altered their programming to broadcast two BBC News specials about the shootings, at 14:15 and 19:30 on the same day. Transmissions of ITV soap Coronation Street were cancelled on 2, 3, and 4 June as the scheduled broadcast was a week-long special involving a violent storyline featuring a gun siege in a factory. The episodes were aired the following week. An edition of the Channel 4 panel game You Have Been Watching, which was due to be broadcast on 3 June 2010, was postponed because it was a crime special.

== Memorials ==
On 9 June 2010, a week after the incident, memorial services were held in the West Cumbria towns affected by the shootings followed by a minute's silence at midday. Soon after the minute's silence taxi drivers on Duke Street sounded their horns for one minute to show their respect. The minute's silence for the Cumbria victims was also marked prior to David Cameron's second Prime Minister's Questions in Parliament. The funerals of the majority of Bird's victims were held at various churches in West Cumbria.

=== Memorial fund ===
A memorial fund was established by the Cumbria Community Foundation to aid victims and communities affected by the West Cumbria shootings.

== See also ==
- List of massacres in Great Britain
  - Horden shooting
  - Skye and Wester Ross attacks
- List of rampage killers
