= Winifred W. Logan =

British nurse theorist (1926–2025)

- Born: 11 April 1926
- Died: 2 April 2025 (aged 98)
- Education: University of Edinburgh (Nursing Degree); University of Edinburgh (M.A.); Columbia University, New York (M.A in Nursing Studies)
- Occupations: Nurse theorist, Nurse Education Officer, executive director, Chief Nursing Officer
- Employer(s): University of Edinburgh School of Nursing; Scottish Office, International Council of Nursing; Abu Dhabi
- Known for: Roper-Logan-Tierney model of nursing

Winifred W. Logan (11 April 1926 – 2 April 2025) was a British nurse theorist who was co-author of the Roper-Logan-Tierney model of nursing, and became an executive director of the International Council of Nurses, and Chief Nurse in Abu Dhabi.

== Early life and studies ==
Winifred W. Logan Gordon was born on 11 April 1926, and trained as a nurse at the University of Edinburgh, and later took a Masters Degree there and at Columbia University, New York, did an M.A. in nursing in 1966. Earlier in her nursing career (around 1950), Logan had come across foreign patients experiencing some 'culture shock' in a Canadian tuberculosis and thoracic health care facility. This led to Logan recognising that nurses need to take cognisance of the patient's biological, psychological, sociocultural and environmental needs in caring for them properly.

Logan started a teaching post at the University of Edinburgh School of Nursing from 1962.

== Nursing career ==
Logan was appointed Nurse Education Officer at the Scottish Office during the 1960s to 1970s. It may be there or at the University, that she first met Nancy Roper, her collaborator on the Activities of Living model of nursing. Logan also became an executive director of the International Council of Nurses in 1960, a consultant for the World Health Organisation (WHO) in Malaysia, Europe, and Iraq. Between 1976 and 1980, Nancy Roper invited Logan and Alison J. Tierney (also an Edinburgh alumna and staff member) to collaborate on a model of nursing. After her writing on nursing theory, Logan became Chief Nursing Officer of Abu Dhabi, establishing nursing services there.

== Roper-Logan-Tierney model of nursing ==
With fellow University of Edinburgh alumna and its School of Nursing employees, Nancy Roper and Alison J. Tierney, Logan was one of this British nurse trio who led the development of the first UK model of nursing published and improved upon, and internationally applied, since 1980.

"The Roper-Logan-Tierney model is based upon activities of living, which evolved from the work of Virginia Henderson in 1966. The activities of daily living are the key to the model of care which seeks to define “what living means:”

- maintaining a safe environment
- communication
- breathing
- eating and drinking
- elimination
- washing and dressing
- temperature control
- mobilization
- working and playing
- expressing sexuality
- sleeping
- death and dying

The factors that influence activities of living are biological, psychological, sociocultural, environmental, and politicoeconomic. These factors make the model holistic, and if they are not included in assessment, it will be both incomplete and flawed."

The authors developed the model up unto a paperback edition (in 2000) which, according to publisher's synopsis was one of the 'author's own assessment of the Roper-Logan-Tierney (RLT) model's use in practice and its place in future nursing development, a unique set of insights... an 'authoritative and complete account of the most influential nursing model in the UK and one of the most influential in the world.'

The impact of the method was also recognised as potential pioneering theory, 'since its inception to influence high quality nursing care provision.' The moswl also allowed relatives to be aware of the care being (and to be given) and its benefits; and was used for handing over care plans from one shift of nurses to another. Co-author Tierney thought that it helped bring in 'an appreciation of just how complex nursing is and has assisted the move from thinking about ill health to that of health. It has helped bring the nursing process to life.'

Nursing researcher writers often refer the model into different clinical settings (in 2004) in a neonatal care unit or (in 2006) a case study on pain control.

Logan was included in the compendium of 'Nursing Theorists and Their Work'.

For more detail see: Roper–Logan–Tierney model of nursing

== Personal life and death ==
After retirement, Logan married widower William J. Gordon, who died in 2009. Logan died on 2 April 2025, at the age of 98. Her memorial took place on 24 April, at Mortonhall Crematorium Edinburgh.

== Publications ==
with Nancy Roper and Alison J. Tierney:

- Learning to Use the Process of Nursing, 1981
- The Elements of Nursing (2nd edition, 1985)
- The Elements of Nursing: a model for nursing based on a model for living, (3rd edition, 1990), 4th edition, 1996)

and later, in her last year of life, with Alison J.Tierney:

- The Roper-Logan-Tierney Model of Nursing: Based on Activities of Living, 2010.

The RLT model editions have been translated into Italian, German, Spanish, Estonian, Finnish, Lithuanian, Portuguese and Japanese.

== See also ==
- Nancy Roper
- Alison J. Tierney
- Roper-Logan-Tierney model of nursing
- Activities of Daily Living
- Nursing Theory
