= Alison J. Tierney =

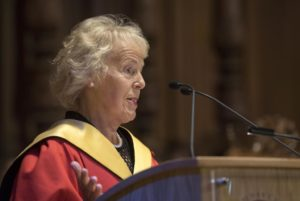
- Known for: Nursing research and education

Academic background
- Education: University of Edinburgh
- Doctoral advisor: Annie Altschul

Academic work
- Discipline: Nursing
- Institutions: The University of Edinburgh; University of Adelaide

Alison Joan Tierney CBE FRCN (born 4 May 1948) is a British nurse researcher and educator and a former editor-in-chief of the Journal of Advanced Nursing. Tierney was one of the first graduates (1971) of the Integrated Degree/Nursing programme at The University of Edinburgh. In 2018 she was named as one of 70 of the most influential nurses in the 70 years of the NHS (National Health Service).

== Education ==
Tierney is a Registered Nurse with a Bachelor of Science (Social Sciences - Nursing) and a PhD in nursing from The University of Edinburgh, presenting the thesis "Behaviour modification in mental deficiency nursing"

== Career ==
Tierney became one of the earliest British nurses in 1976 to complete a doctoral degree undertaken in a university nursing department, sponsored by a government research training fellowship. She went on to lead a research-based career and became a senior academic nurse leader. In 1980, together with colleagues Nancy Roper, and Winifred W. Logan, and founded on the work of Virginia Henderson, she developed the 'activities of living' nursing model commonly referred to as the Roper–Logan–Tierney model of nursing and published by Churchill Livingstone in The Elements of Nursing. New editions were published in 1985, 1990 and 1996 and, with translation into many languages, it became well known around the world and of particular interest in some European centres, for example in the nursing school of the University of Heidelberg which had implemented nursing theories from the US as early as 1953. Roper, Logan and Tierney's model has underpinned much nursing practice in the UK and beyond. Its use and evaluation was reviewed by the authors in a final monograph published in 2000.

Tierney first joined the staff of the Department of Nursing Studies at The University of Edinburgh as a Lecturer and was conferred with a Personal Chair in Nursing Research in October 1997. For a 10-year period she was Director of their government-funded Nursing Research Unit. After a final period as Head of Nursing Studies, Tierney left in 2002 to join the University of Adelaide in South Australia as Professor and Head of the Department of Clinical Nursing, and as Director of the South Australian Center of The Joanna Briggs Institute at the Royal Adelaide Hospital. She remained affiliated to the University of Adelaide as an adjunct professor until 2020.

Tierney has held various other appointments and has served on many national and international committees. She represented the Royal College of Nursing from 1990 to 1997 in the Workgroup of European Nursing Researchers. She acted as an expert adviser on nursing research with Prof Bill Holzemer (UCLA) to the International Council of Nurses in 1996 and in 1997 co-chaired with Dr P Grady (National Institute of Nursing Research) the expert group convened by the International Council of Nurses to formulate 'Priorities for the International Nursing Research Agenda'. She served on the Nursing Panel in the UK 2001 Research Exercise Assessment Exercise. She chaired an international panel in 2002-3 for a national evaluation of nursing research in Finland conducted by the Academy of Finland. In 2003, she became Editor-in-Chief of the Journal of Advanced Nursing and held that post until the end of 2011. She has held visiting professor appointments at various universities, including King's College London and the Fudan University in Shanghai, China. For five years (2006-2011) she held a Scottish Government public appointment as a Non-Executive Director of NHS Lothian.

== Recognition ==
Tierney is a Fellow (1995) of the Royal College of Nursing. For her achievements in the field of nursing research and education she was appointed a CBE in 2002. She has received honorary doctoral degrees from Edinburgh Napier University in 2004, the University of Turku in Finland in 2006, Queen Margaret University in 2011 and in July 2018 the University of Edinburgh awarded her the honorary degree of Doctor honoris causa.

== Publications ==
- Roper, Nancy; Logan, Winifred W.; Tierney, Alison J. (1980). The elements of nursing. Churchill Livingstone. ISBN 9780443015779.
- Roper, Nancy; Logan, Winifred W.; Tierney, Alison J. (2000). The Roper-Logan-Tierney Model of Nursing: Based on Activities of Living. Churchill Livingstone. ISBN 9780443063732.
