= Cumbria Partnership NHS Foundation Trust =

Chesterfield Royal Hospital NHS Foundation Trust
- Type: NHS hospital trust
- Established: October 2007
- Disbanded: 1 October 2019
- Region served: Cumbria, England
- Budget: £10 million deficit in 2015/6
- Hospitals: Furness General Hospital, Ramsey Unit; Mary Hewetson Cottage Hospital; Keswick Penrith Community Hospital, Cockermouth Community Hospital; Workington Community Hospital; Victoria Cottage Hospital (Maryport, Cumbria)
- Chair: Mahmud Nawaz
- Chief executive: Dr. Hal Spencer
- Staff: 4,973

Cumbria Partnership NHS Foundation Trust was an NHS foundation trust that provided mental health and community services in Cumbria, England. It ran the Ramsey Unit at Furness General Hospital, Barrow In Furness, Mary Hewetson Cottage Hospital, Keswick Penrith Community Hospital, Cockermouth Community Hospital, Workington Community Hospital, Victoria Cottage Hospital (Maryport, Cumbria), Reiver House and The Carleton Clinic, Carlisle.

It became an NHS Foundation Trust in October 2007 and took over community services in the county in 2010.

The Trust was criticised by the Care Quality Commission in 2013 over failings at the Ramsey Unit in the grounds of Furness General Hospital but two subsequent inspections were more positive. It was rated inadequate in 2016 but in 2017 an inspection of health visitors, school nurses, therapies, children's nurses, community paediatrics, sexual health and family nurse partnerships rated them good.

It expects a deficit of £10 million for 2015/6.

In 2018 it proposed to merge with North Cumbria University Hospitals NHS Trust. The two trusts merged on 1 October 2019, forming North Cumbria Integrated Care NHS Foundation Trust.

== See also ==
- Healthcare in Cumbria
- List of NHS trusts
