= Mersey Ambulance Service =

British ambulance services trust

The Mersey Ambulance Service was an NHS ambulance services trust until 1 July 2006. It merged into the North West Ambulance Service.

Albert Guinney, who died in 2003 at the age of 79, from West Derby, was Merseyside's ambulance chief most of his career and was awarded the OBE by the Queen in 1986. He was one of the youngest ambulance bosses in the country when he took up the job in 1960 aged 36.

David Todhunter, chief executive of the service, resigned in 2001 after allegations that "deep personal antipathy" between Mr Todhunter and a key member of North West Aero Medical Services had contributed to fatal delays in transferring patients.

== See also ==
- Emergency medical services in the United Kingdom
- Healthcare in Liverpool
- National Health Service
