= Army School of Nursing =

Coordinates: 38.974883°N 77.0298°W

The Army School of Nursing was a nursing school created by the United States government on May 25, 1918, during the height of World War I. The School was authorized by the Secretary of War as an alternative to utilizing nurses' aides in Army hospitals. Courses of instruction opened at several Army hospitals in July 1918.

Annie W. Goodrich became the first Dean of the Army School of Nursing. Although the Adjutant General authorized a military uniform and an insignia consisting of a bronze lamp superimposed on the caduceus, the students in the Army School of Nursing retained civilian status. In December 1918, there were 1,578 students in the program. By 1923, the school had been consolidated at Walter Reed General Hospital. It was discontinued by the Secretary of War on 12 August 1931 as an economy measure. A total of 937 young women completed the course in nursing and received the diploma of the school. Among the many notable graduates were Mary G. Phillips and Ruby F. Bryant, who later became Chiefs of the Army Nurse Corps, and Virginia Henderson.
