= Mary G. Phillips =

United States Army officer (1903–1980)

Mary Genevieve Phillips
- Born: December 2, 1903; Eau Claire, Wisconsin, US
- Died: January 30, 1980 (aged 76)
- Military career
- Allegiance: United States
- Branch: United States Army
- Service years: 1937–1951
- Awards: Legion of Merit

Mary Genevieve Phillips (December 2, 1903 – January 30, 1980) was a United States Army officer who served as the eighth superintendent of the United States Army Nurse Corps, (1947-1951). She was the first graduate of the Army School of Nursing to serve as superintendent and the first to complete the statutory four-year term. During World War II, she served as the First Assistant to the Superintendent, Army Nurse Corps and was Director of Nursing Services, Armed Forces of the Western Pacific.

== Life ==
Phillips was born on December 2, 1903, in Eau Claire, Wisconsin. She graduated from Medford Area Senior High School in 1921 and attended the University of Wisconsin–Madison. From 1922 to 1926, she worked as a clerk and teacher in Prairie du Sac, Wisconsin, Lime Ridge, Wisconsin and Medford, Wisconsin. In 1926, Phillips entered the Army School of Nursing, where she graduated three years later and joined the United States Army Nurse Corps. In 1935 she earned a Bachelor of Science from Teachers College, Columbia University. Before earning her degree, Phillips worked at the Army School of Nursing, Walter Reed General Hospital, Fort Slocum, and Fort Jay. She served in the Philippine Department from 1937 to 1939. She was promoted to captain in 1941. That year she became Principal Chief Nurse at Fort Devens, Massachusetts and later served in the same post at Camp Shanks in New York.

Phillips was promoted to major in May 1943 and then lieutenant colonel seven months later. During World War II, she served as the First Assistant to the Superintendent, Army Nurse Corps. In 1945 she became director of Nursing Services, Armed Forces of the Western Pacific. She became the eighth Army Nursing Corps Superintendent on 1 October 1947, serving until 30 September 1951. Under her tenure as Chief, the Army Nursing Corps was exempted from the Army-wide requirement that all commissioned officers hold or achieve baccalaureate degrees. Colonel Phillips set the goal for its officers to complete an accredited program leading to an undergraduate degree, preferably in nursing. She presided over the Corps during the first year of the Korean War. Among her awards and honors include the Legion of Merit, which she received on 23 October 1945.

Colonel Phillips died of a stroke on January 30, 1980.
