= North West Ambulance Service =

Ambulance service for North West England

North West Ambulance Service NHS Trust
- NWAS

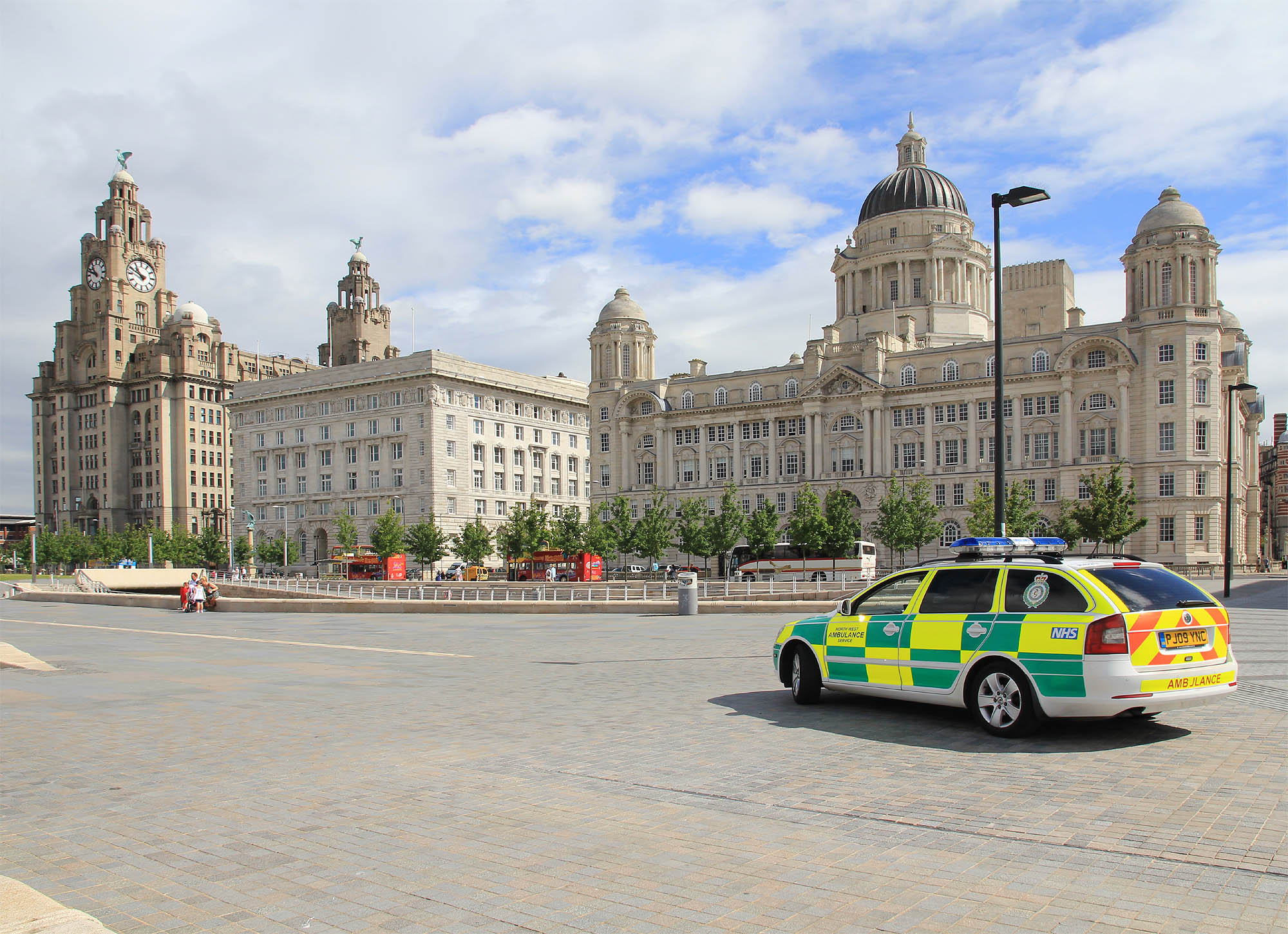
- A rapid response vehicle (RRV) going past the Three Graces of Liverpool

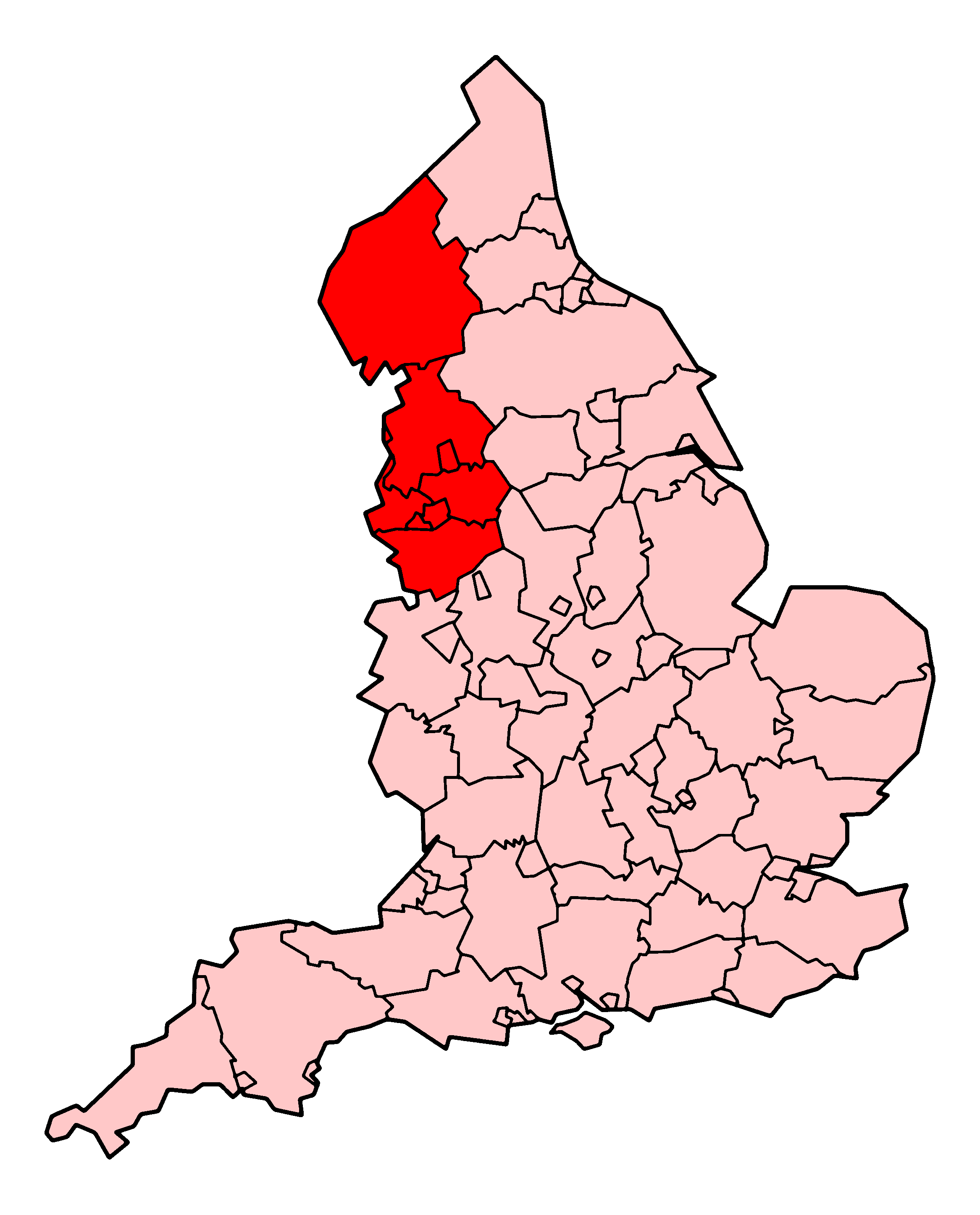
- Map of North West Ambulance Service's coverage
- Type: NHS trust
- Established: 1 July 2006
- Headquarters: Bolton
- Region served: Greater Manchester, Cheshire, Merseyside, Cumbria, Lancashire and part of the High Peak district of Derbyshire
- Area size: 5,400 sq. miles
- Population: 7.5 million
- Budget: £310 million (Approx)
- Chair: Julia Mulligan
- Chief executive: Salman Desai
- Staff: 5,912 (2018/19)
- Website: www.nwas.nhs.uk

The North West Ambulance Service NHS Trust (NWAS) is the ambulance service for North West England. It is one of ten ambulance trusts providing England with Emergency medical services, and is part of the National Health Service, receiving direct government funding for its role.

NWAS was formed on 1 July 2006, following the merger of four previous services (Cumbria Ambulance Service; Lancashire Ambulance Service; Cheshire and Mersey Ambulance Service; and Greater Manchester Ambulance Service) as part of Health Minister Lord Warner's plans to combine ambulance services.

Based in Bolton, the trust provides services to over 7 million people in Greater Manchester, Cheshire, Merseyside, Lancashire, Cumbria, and the North Western fringes of the High Peak district of Derbyshire (covering the towns of Glossop and Hadfield) in an area of 5,500 square miles (14,000 km^{2}). NWAS provides emergency ambulance response via the 999 system, as well as operating the NHS 111 advice service for North West England.

They also operate non-emergency patient transport services (PTS) for part of the region, and in 2013/2014 carried out 1.2 million such journeys. Since 2016, the PTS in Cheshire, Warrington and Wirral has instead been carried out by West Midlands Ambulance Service.

== Fleet ==
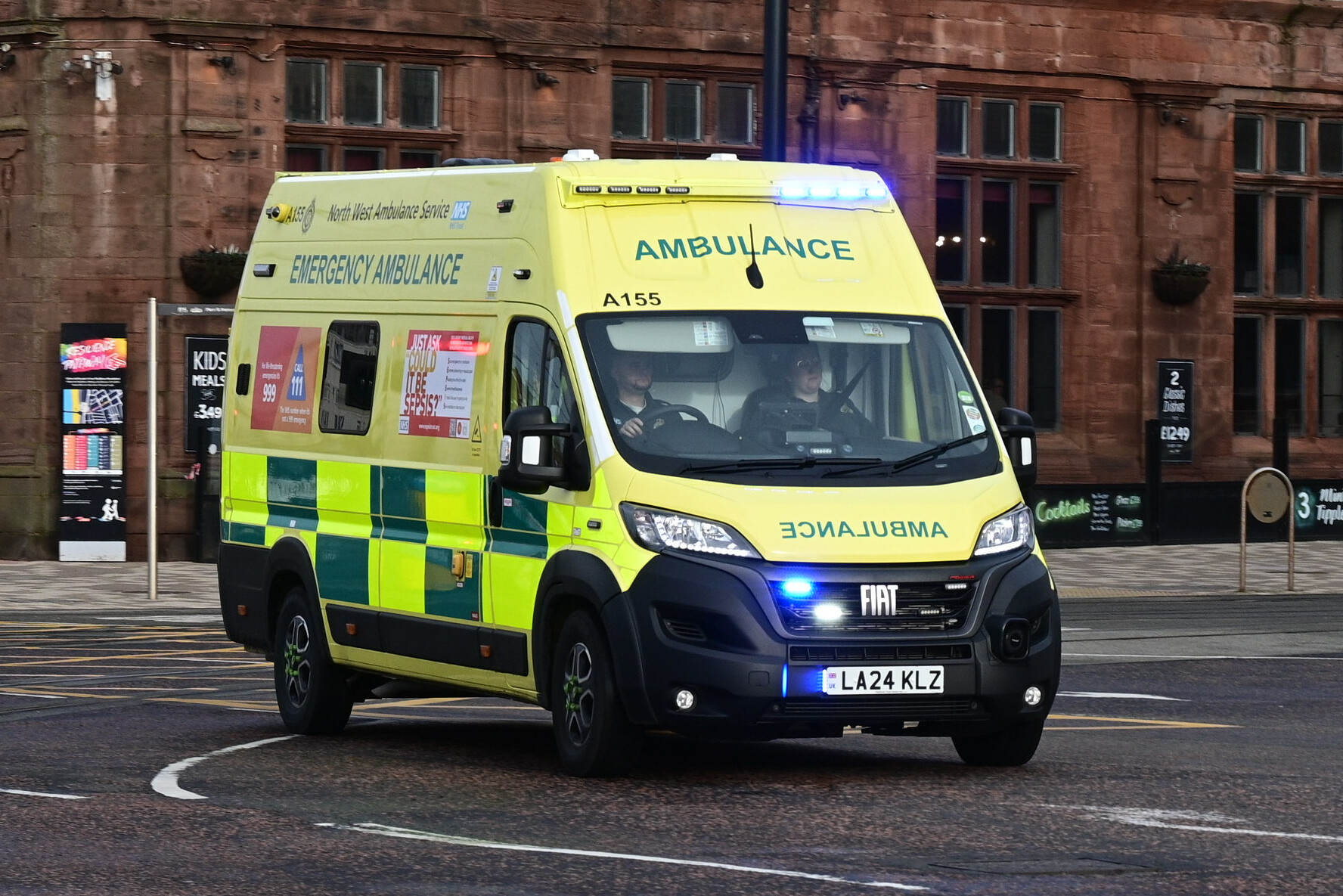
NWAS Fiat Ducato ambulance in Blackpool in November 2024

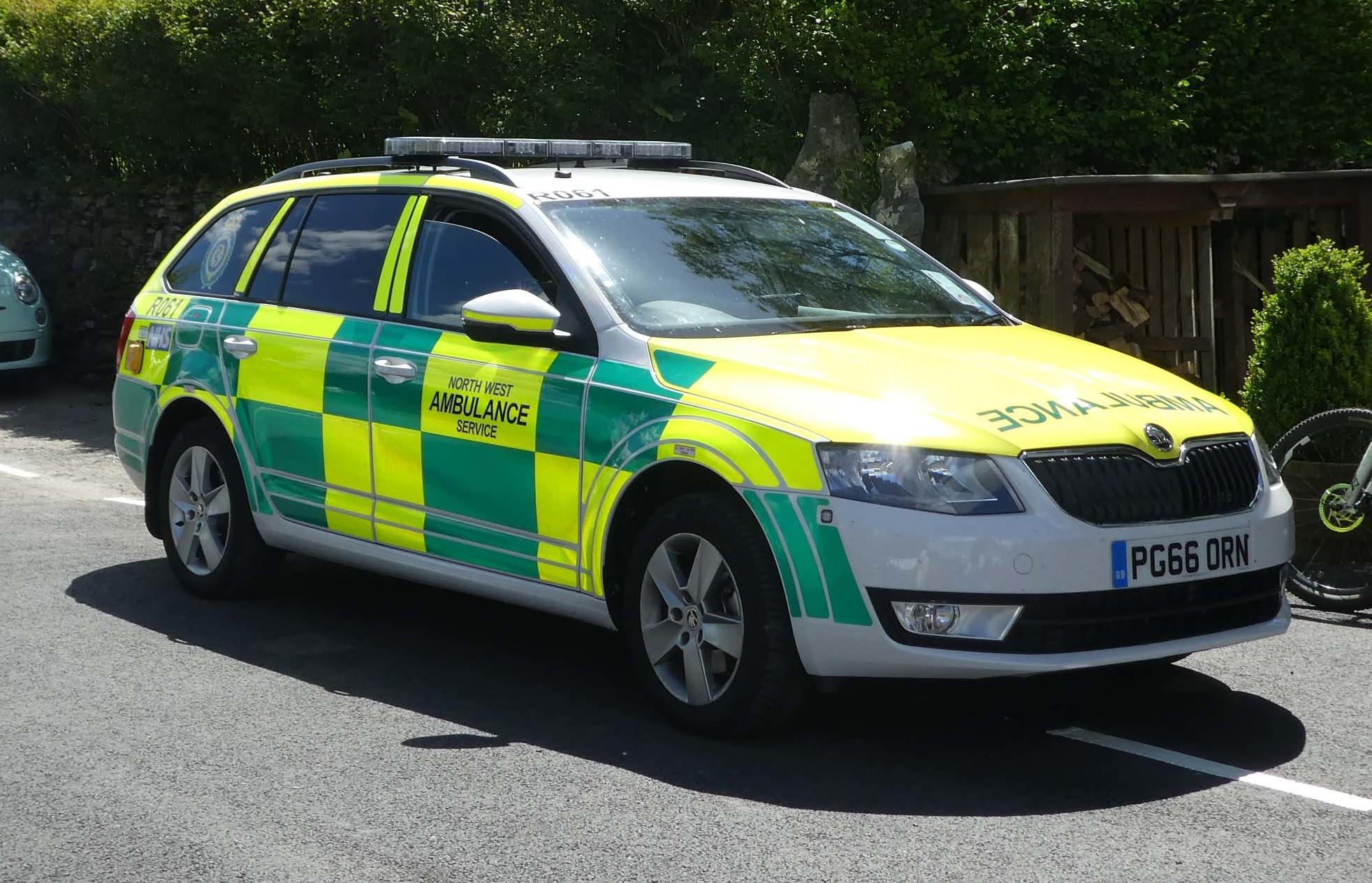
Skoda Octavia response car in 2017

NWAS utilise a mixed fleet of emergency and patient transport ambulances. As a member of the Northern Ambulance Alliance, the trust shares a common fleet of Fiat Ducato and MAN TGE dual crewed ambulances and Kia EV6, Hyundai Ioniq 5 and BMW X1 (F48) rapid response cars. In Greater Manchester, some paramedics respond on specially converted bicycles; cycle responders were also trialled in Liverpool during the 2023 Eurovision Song Contest.

In 2017, NWAS began using 26 BMW i3 electric cars for use as rapid response vehicles (phased out in 2023 in favour of the Kia EV6). The rollout of electric vehicles in the NWAS fleet expanded with the delivery of eight Mercedes-Benz eVito mental health ambulances in 2022 and 2023. These have since been transferred to Mersey Care NHS Foundation Trust following the end of the mental health response program in early 2026.

== Locations and structure ==
The trust currently operates from 104 ambulance stations across the North West. The most northerly station is at Carlisle, and the furthest south is at Crewe. It also maintains three Integrated Contact Centres (ICCs) for the handling of 999, NHS 111 and Patient Transport Service calls and the dispatch of emergency and non emergency ambulances.

- Parkway (Manchester Area)
- Estuary Point (Cheshire and Mersey Area) – formerly Elm House
- Broughton (Cumbria and Lancashire Area)

In 2017, NWAS signed an agreement to purchase a new ICC and area office for £2.9 million at Liverpool International Business Park next to Liverpool John Lennon Airport As of 2019, this building has been converted and services have now migrated from the Anfield site which has since been redeveloped for the Liverpool Hazardous area response team.

Over recent years, the trust has combined many of their older ambulance stations into purpose-built facilities shared with other emergency services, including Greater Manchester Fire and Rescue, Lancashire Fire and Rescue and Greater Manchester Police.

== Performance ==
NWAS was the first ambulance trust to be inspected by the Care Quality Commission (CQC), in August 2014. The CQC found the trust provided safe and effective services which were well-led and with a clear focus on quality but it was criticised for taking too many callers to hospital and for sending ambulances when other responses would have been more appropriate. The trust was subsequently inspected in 2018 and was found to have improved with a rating of "Good"

=== CQC performance rating ===
In its last inspection of the service in February 2020, the Care Quality Commission (CQC) gave the following ratings on a scale of outstanding (the service is performing exceptionally well), good (the service is performing well and meeting our expectations), requires improvement (the service isn't performing as well as it should) and inadequate (the service is performing badly):

Inspection Reports
Area	Rating 2017	Rating 2018	Rating 2020
Are services Safe?	Requires improvement	Good	Good
Are services Effective?	Good	Good	Good
Are services Caring	Good	Good	Good
Are services Responsive	Good	Good	Good
Are services Well-led	Requires improvement	Good	Good
Overall rating	Requires improvement	Good	Good

== See also ==
- Emergency medical services in the United Kingdom
- Healthcare in Cheshire
- Healthcare in Cumbria
- Healthcare in Greater Manchester
- Healthcare in Lancashire
- Healthcare in Merseyside
- North West Air Ambulance
- List of NHS trusts
