= Carlisle City General Hospital =

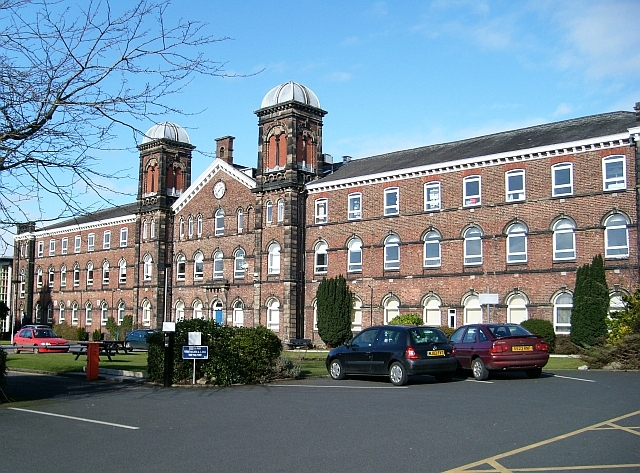
- Carlisle City General Hospital

- Shown in Cumbria

Geography
- Location: Fusehill Street, Carlisle, Cumbria, England
- Coordinates: 54.8914°N 2.9224°W

Organisation
- Care system: NHS

History
- Founded: 1863
- Closed: 1999

The Carlisle City General Hospital was a health facility in Fusehill Street, Carlisle, Cumbria, England. It is a Grade II listed building.

== History ==
The facility has its origins in the Carlisle Union Workhouse which was designed by Henry Lockwood and William Mawson and was completed in 1863. It became a military hospital at Easter 1917 during both the First World War and then served as a military hospital again during the Second World War. It joined the National Health Service as the Carlisle City General Hospital in 1948. After services transferred to the new Cumberland Infirmary, it closed in 1999. It was subsequently converted to become St Martin's College and evolved to become the Carlisle campus of the University of Cumbria.
