= Ruby F. Bryant =

American nurse (1906–2002)

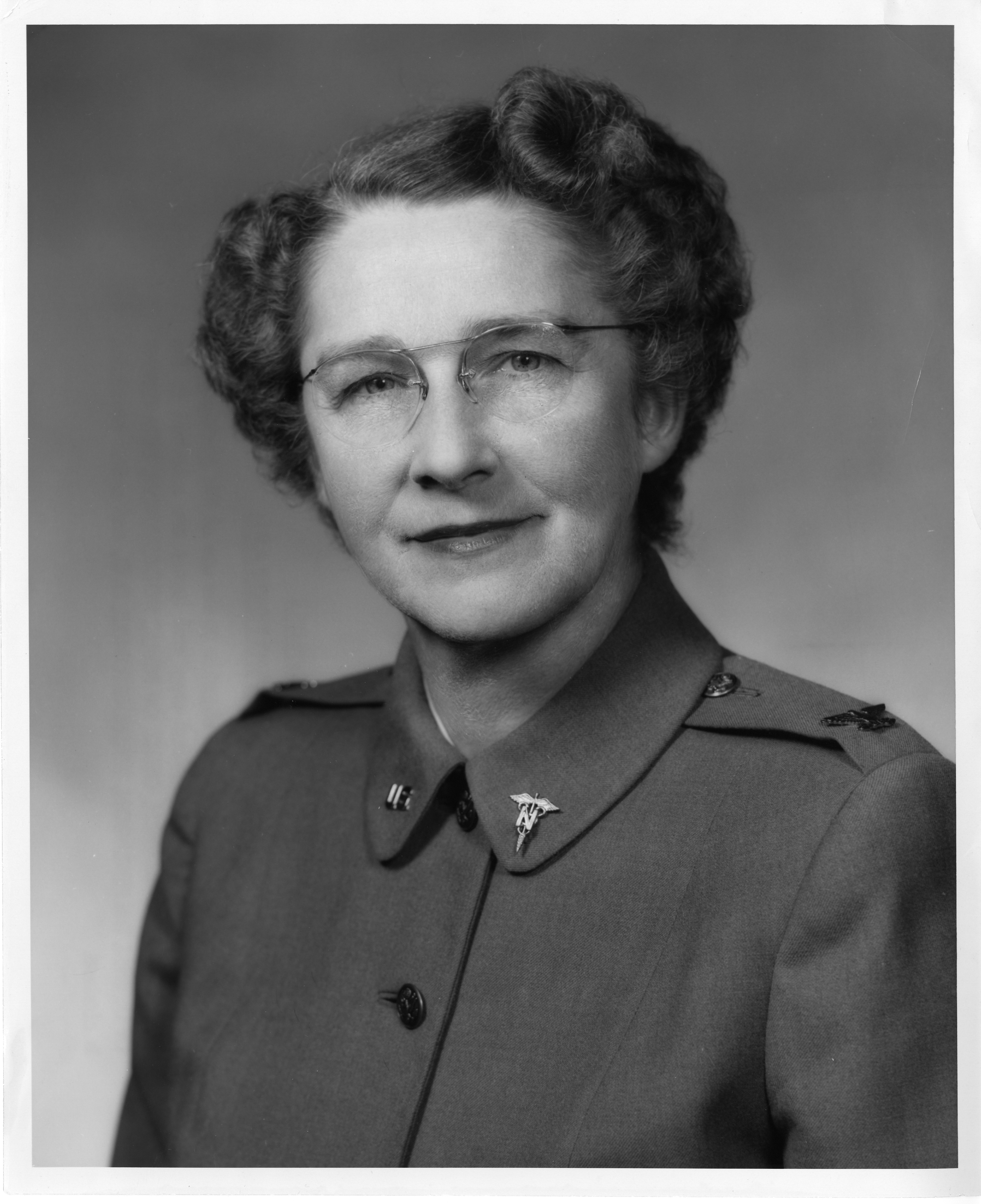
Ruby F. Bryant

Ruby Ficklin Bryant (April 24, 1906 – January 3, 2002) was the ninth chief of the United States Army Nurse Corps. She received the Legion of Merit for her services to the government.

== Biography ==
Bryant was born on April 24, 1906, in Emmerton, Virginia. After graduating from Farnham High School, she attended the Fredericksburg State Teachers College, and taught school in Vermont for several years. After being one of the last students to graduate from the Army School of Nursing, Bryant first worked as a nurse for the Civilian Conservation Corps at Walter Reed General Hospital. After becoming a member of the United States Army Nurse Corps, she was transferred to the Philippines, working at Fort Mills and Sternberg General Hospital. Bryant was also involved in building a hospital in the Malinta Tunnel. When she returned to the United States, she was appointed assistant chief of the Station Hospital at Fort Benning, and later chief nurse at Edgewood Arsenal. After various other nursing commands, including at the Far East Command and Sixth United States Army, she became chief of the Nursing Corps.

Bryant presided over the Corps during the latter half of the Korean War. Upon completion of her term as Chief of the Corps, she reverted to her permanent grade of lieutenant colonel and was assigned as Chief, Nursing Service, Medical Division, Europe. In 1958, she was among the first three women to be promoted to the permanent grade of colonel in the Army. She later served as Director, Nursing Activities, Brooke Army Medical Center, Fort Sam Houston, Texas, until she retired on 30 June 1961. She received the Legion of Merit among her awards and honors. Bryant died in 2002.
