= Emily Margaret Cummins =

Nursing leader

Emily Margaret Cummins R.R.C.
- Born: 1866; Lewisham
- Died: 14 April 1934 (aged 67–68)
- Education: The London Hospital
- Occupations: Matron and nursing leader

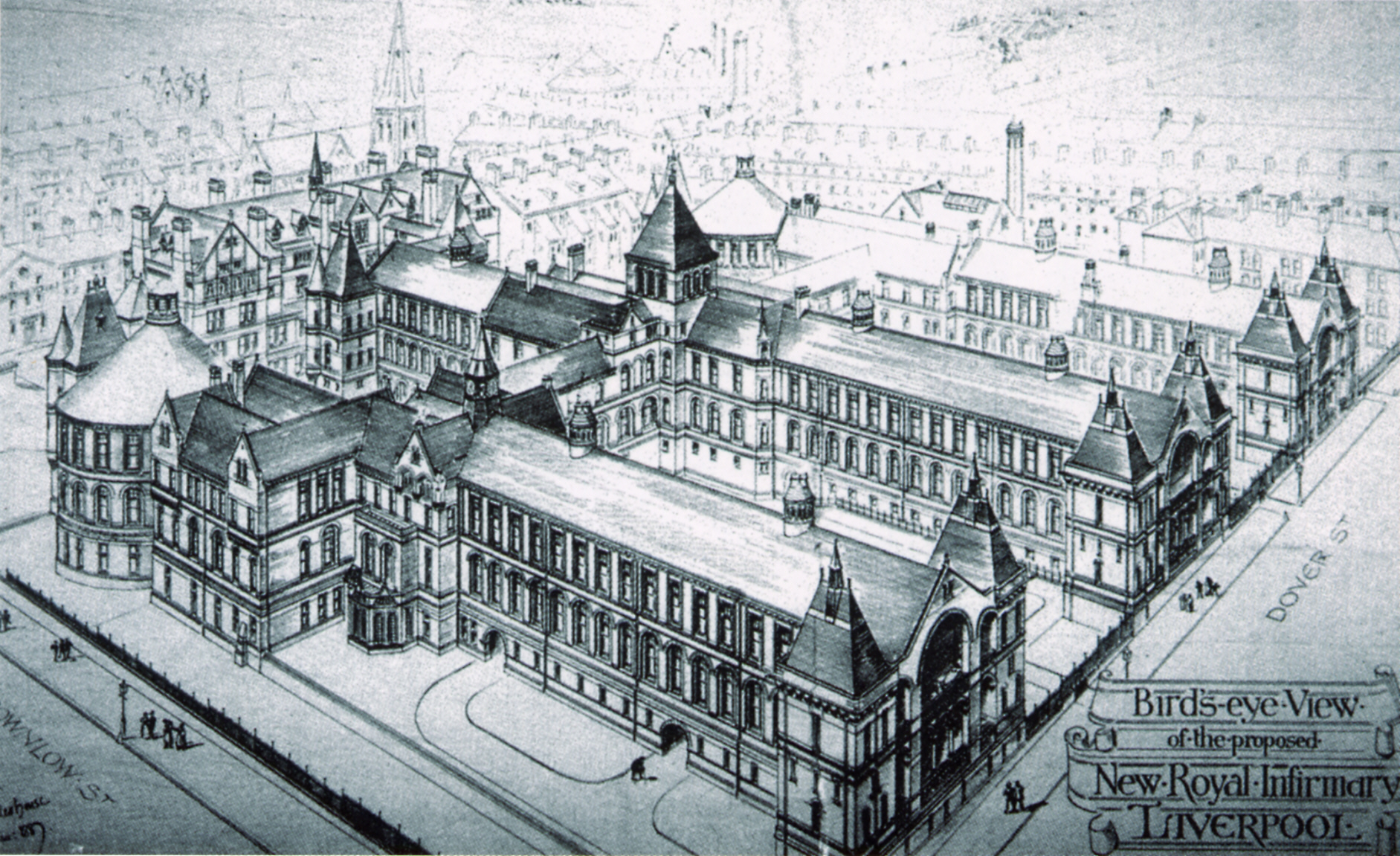
Emily Cummins was matron here between 1911 and 1924

Emily 'Margaret' Cummins, R.R.C. (1866–1934) was a nursing leader and was matron of the Liverpool Royal Infirmary, from 1911 until 1924. In 1924 Cummins arranged what is thought to be the first annual nurses service in England to coincide with the anniversary of the birth of Florence Nightingale. Cummins was involved in the formation and development of professional nursing and the College of Nursing (Now RCN).

== Early life ==
Cummins was born in Lewisham in 1866. She was the eldest child of two born to William John Lawrence Cummins, a Major in the army and engineer at Woolwich, and his wife Emily. Her mother was an innkeeper in 1891, and ran the Royal Oak public house in Milbourn St Andrew, near Blandford in Dorset. Cummins lived at home until she commenced training aged 28 years old.

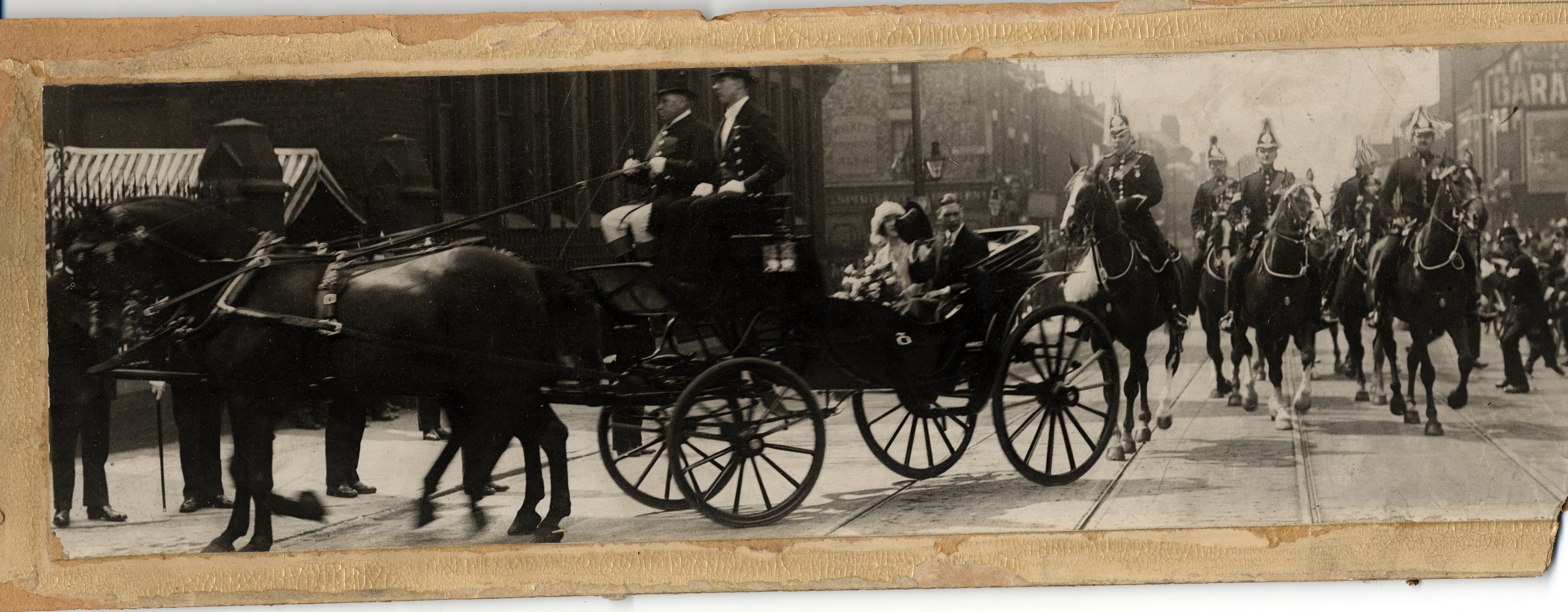
Emily Cummins was matron and present at the laying of the foundation stone for the new nurses home in 1923.

== Career ==
Cummins trained as a nurse at The London Hospital under Eva Luckes between 1895 and 1897. After Cummins completed her training she worked there as a staff nurse for 15 months. In 1898 she was recommended as a sister to Anna Baillie, a former Londoner, and the matron of the Royal Infirmary, Bristol. Shortly after moving to Bristol she was appointed Assistant Matron. Whilst in Bristol she undertook a session as a lecturer on Nursing for the Merchants Venturers Technical College, Bristol.

In 1903 she was appointed as matron of Cumberland Infirmary in Carlisle. She stayed there until 1911 when she was appointed as matron of Liverpool Royal Infirmary. Cummins was regarded as being a 'very progressive' matron. Whilst there she oversaw development of a four-year training programme for nurses, new accommodation for nurses, and better recreational facilities for nurses including a tennis court.

She was first president of the Liverpool College of Nursing Centre, one of the earliest regional centres of the College of Nursing. She was on the Council of the College of Nursing from 1919 to 1924. Cummins was also on the committee of the Association of Hospital Matrons. She was Chairman of the Liverpool and Cheshire groups of the Matrons Association.

== Retirement ==
Cummins enjoyed the countryside, and when she retired she planned to move to a country cottage. Cummins died at Teignmouth Hospital on 14 April 1934 from Atrial Fibrillation and a Cerebral Embolism. Miss Jones, Cummins former assistant matron, and her successor at the Liverpool Royal Infirmary, attended Cummins's funeral service which was held at Ringmore Church near Kingsbridge in Devon. Archdeacon Howson gave the address at her memorial service which was held in the chapel of Liverpool Royal Infirmary the day after her death.

== Honours ==
Cummins was awarded the Royal Red Cross in 1919.
