= Roper–Logan–Tierney model of nursing =

Model of nursing care based on daily living

The Roper, Logan and Tierney model of nursing (originally published in 1980, and subsequently revised in 1985, 1990, 1998 and the latest edition in 2000) is a model of nursing care based on activities of living (ALs). It is extremely prevalent in the United Kingdom, particularly in the public sector. The model is named after the authors; Nancy Roper, Winifred W. Logan and Alison J. Tierney.

== Introduction ==
First developed in 1980, this model is based upon work by Nancy Roper in 1976. It is the most widely used nursing model in the United Kingdom. The model is based loosely upon the activities of daily living that evolved from the work of Virginia Henderson in 1966. The latest book edited by these women, published in 2001, is their culminating and completing work in which they upgrade their model based on their view of societal needs. The original purpose of the model was to be an assessment used throughout the patient's care, but it has become the norm in UK nursing to use it only as a checklist on admission. It is often used to assess how a patient's life has changed due to illness or admission to hospital rather than as a way of planning for increased independence and quality of life.

== Activities of living ==
Activities of Living (AL) is to promote maximum independence, through complete assessment leading to interventions that further support independence in areas that may prove difficult or impossible for the individual on their own.

The activities of living assesses the individual's relative independence and potential for independence on a continuum ranging from complete dependence to complete independence in order to determine what interventions will lead to increased independence as well as what ongoing support is or will be required to compensate for dependency. Its application requires that it be used throughout the engagement with the patient (not only on admission) as an approach to problems and their resolution, and as a tool to determine how the patient can be supported to learn about, cope with, adjust and improve their own health and challenges.

The ALs themselves are frequently misunderstood or are assumed to have limited scope, leading to dissatisfaction with the model, when one fails to recognise that the ALs are more complex than the title would lead one to believe. For this reason, it is not recommended in the model that it be used as a checklist, but rather as Roper states, "as a cognitive approach to the assessment and care of the patient, not on paper as a list of boxes, but in the nurse's approach to and organisation of their care," and that nurses in clinical practice deepen their knowledge and understanding of the model and its application; it is essential that those using such a widespread tool be competent in its correct application.

The ALs are listed as:

- Breathing
- Maintaining a safe environment
- Communication
- Eating and drinking
- Elimination
- Washing and dressing
- Controlling temperature
- Mobilisation
- Working and playing
- Expressing sexuality
- Sleeping
- Death and dying

These activities, outlining both the norm for the patient as well as any changes that may have resulted from current changes in condition, are assessed on admission onto a ward or service, and are reviewed as the patient progresses and as the care plan evolves. To provide effective care, all of the patient's needs (which are determined by assessing the patient's specific abilities and preferences relative to each activity, based on the factors listed) must be met as practicably as possible through supporting the patient to meet those needs independently or by providing the care directly, most preferably by a combination of the two.

By considering changes in the dependence-independence continuum, one can see how the patient is either improving or failing to improve, providing evidence either for or against the current care plan and giving guidance as to the level of care the patient does or may require. This value only results when the assessment is done frequently as changes occur and if it is combined with health improvement and health promotion. It is not effective in a paternalistic environment where all care is provided for an individual even when self care is possible.

== Factors influencing activities of living ==
The following factors that affect ALs are identified. Nancy Roper, when interviewed by members of the Royal College of Nursing's (RCN) Association of Nursing Students at RCN Congress in 2002 in Harrogate stated that the greatest disappointment she held for the use of the model in the UK was the lack of application of the five factors listed below, citing that these are the factors which make the model holistic, and that failure to consider these factors means that the resulting assessment is both incomplete and flawed. She implored students to support the use of the model through promoting an understanding of these factors as an element of the model.

These factors do not stand alone; they are used to determine the individual's relative independence (and requirements to restore independence) for each other activity of daily living.

- Biological- the impact of overall health, of current illness or injury, and the scope of the individual's anatomy and physiology all are considered under this aspect. An example is how having diabetes mellitus causes the person's nutritional activities to differ from those of a person without diabetes.
- Psychological- the impact of not only emotion, but cognition, spiritual beliefs and the ability to understand. Roper explained this was about "knowing, thinking, hoping, feeling and believing". One example of the application of this factor would be how having paranoid thoughts might influence independence in communication; another example would be how lack of literacy could impact independence in health promotion.
- Sociocultural- the impact of society and culture experienced by the individual. Expectations and values based on (perceived or actual) social class or status, or related to the individual's perceived or actual health or ability to carry our activities of daily living. Culture within this factor relates to the beliefs, expectations and values held by the individual both for themselves and by others pertaining to their independence in and ability to carry out activities of daily living. One example is when caring for an individual of advanced age and how societies expectations and assumptions about infirmity and cognitive decline, even if not present in the individual, could influence the delivery of care and level of independence permitted by those with sufficient authority to curtail it.
- Environmental- Roper stated in the interview above that this consideration made hers the first truly "green" model, as it recommends consideration of not only the impact of the environment on the activities of daily living, but also the impact of the individual's ALs on the environment. One example of the environment impacting ALs is to consider if damp is present in one's home how that might impact independence in breathing (as damp can be related to breathing impairments); another example, using the "green" application, would be how dressings that are soiled with potentially hazardous fluids should be disposed of after removal.
- Politicoeconomic – this is the impact of government, politics and the economy on ALs. Issues such as funding, government policies and programmes, state of war or violent conflict, availability and access to benefits, political reforms and government targets, interest rates and availability of fundings (both public and private) all are considered under this factor. One example is how becoming eligible for housing benefit might impact a person's independence, especially if the current housing is poor or inadequate; another example is how living in a place where violence and conflict are the norm would impact the ability to self care.

== The life span continuum ==
The model incorporates a life span continuum, where the individual passes from fully dependent at birth, to fully independent in the midlife, and returns to fully dependent in their old age/after death. Some researchers argue that the lifespan continuum begins at conception, others that it begins at birth.

== Modifications ==
Within short-stay settings such as surgery or in areas where the assessor is uncomfortable with or unsure of the applicability of certain ALs, it is common for the activities 'sexuality' and 'death' to be disregarded. These modifications depend upon the institution or the nurse and often results from a lack of understanding of the application of, or the factors within, the model. This is unfortunate, because this limits the application of the model and thereby reduces its efficacy.

Often clinical settings use a list of the activities of daily living as an assessment document, without any reference to the other elements of the model; Roper herself rejected the use of the list of ADLs as a "checklist" as she stated that it was essential not simply to read the title of the ADL, but to base assessment on knowledge of the scope of the ADL as assessed using the 5 key factors. Roper stated that if nurses themselves were uncomfortable discussing certain factors, they might assume patients also would be and thereby attribute the lack of assessment to the patient's preference, when the patient's opinion was never actually sought.

Roper's assertion leads one to believe that rather than delete or disregard activities of daily living, it can benefit the individual being assessed if the nurse uses the model more thoroughly and assesses the ADL fully, using the 5 factors, irrespective of the area in which the care is being received. Roper stated "The patient is the patient, they are not a different patient because they are in a different clinical area. Their needs are the same- it's who will meet those needs that changes". For example, "sexuality" as an activity of daily living refers not only to the act of reproduction, but also to body image, self-esteem and gender-related beliefs, roles, values and practices, all issues that could have a high degree of relevance for the individual about to undergo surgery. Another example is the ADL "death" which does not only apply strictly to the specific last moments of life, but also to the processes perceived to lead up to the eventuality of death, such as loss of independence, periods of ill health, fear of failure to recover, and fear of the unknown. These are all immeasurably relevant to most or all episodes of care.

The theory continues to be discussed in published works, for example in The Theoretical Basis for Nursing

== See also ==
- Activities of daily living
- Nursing
- Nursing theory
