= Garry Purdham =

English rugby league footballer & murder victim (1978 – 2010)

Personal information
- Full name: Garry John Purdham
- Born: 20 October 1978 Whitehaven, Cumbria, England
- Died: 2 June 2010 (aged 31) Gosforth, Cumbria, England

Playing information
- Position: Second-row
Club
Years	Team	Pld	T	G	FG	P
1999–05	Whitehaven	127	17	0	0	68
2005–08	Workington Town	58	5	0	1	21
	Total	185	22	0	1	89

Garry John Purdham (20 October 1978 – 2 June 2010) was an English professional rugby league player and farmer. He was killed in the 2010 Cumbria shootings.

== Career ==
Purdham began his professional rugby league career in 1999 with Whitehaven. There he played alongside his brother Rob Purdham.

In 2005 Purdham transferred to the nearby club Workington Town. He struggled with a recurring knee injury at Workington and ultimately required four operations in six years.

Purdham retired from professional rugby league after the 2008 season; however, he returned in 2009 to play amateur rugby league for Egremont Rangers.

== Death ==
On 2 June 2010, Purdham was working with his uncle mending a wire fence on his father's farm near the Red Admiral Hotel at Boonwood, near Gosforth when he was shot and killed. He became the ninth murder victim of spree killer Derrick Bird, who killed 12 people including the gunman’s twin brother David and injured 11 others that day before committing suicide.

In honour of Purdham and the other Cumbria victims, one minute's silence was observed before every rugby league match played in England on the weekend of 5–6 June 2010.

The Workington club has announced that a memorial in honour of Purdham will be established. His funeral and cremation were held on 10 June 2010, attended by over 600 mourners.

== Family ==
Purdham was survived by a wife and two children. He was the brother of Rob Purdham, a former player with Harlequins RL who played for England five times.
