= North Cumbria University Hospitals NHS Trust =

- Type: NHS hospital trust
- Established: April 2006
- Disbanded: October 2019
- Budget: £22.8 million deficit in 2013-14
- Hospitals: Cumberland Infirmary; Penrith Hospital birthing unit; West Cumberland Hospital
- Staff: 4500
- Website: North Cumbria University Hospitals NHS Trust

North Cumbria University Hospitals NHS Trust was created in April 2001 by merging Carlisle Hospitals NHS Trust and West Cumbria Healthcare NHS Trust. It ran Cumberland Infirmary in Carlisle, Cumbria, the birthing unit at Penrith Hospital and West Cumberland Hospital in Whitehaven, England. In January 2012, the Trust decided that its preferred future was as part of Northumbria Healthcare NHS Foundation Trust but in 2018 it proposed to merge with Cumbria Partnership NHS Foundation Trust. The merger took place in October 2019. The new organisation is called North Cumbria Integrated Care NHS Foundation Trust.

== Financial problems ==
The Trust's financial problems are longstanding and associated with the move of services out of hospital closer to patients' homes and the difficulties of delivering services in a large rural area. The Trust predicts a deficit of £22.8m in 2013-14. In May 2014 it was reported that the Trust had been forced to get a loan in order to pay its debts. According to its loan application, only 19.5 per cent of the trust’s non-NHS suppliers had been paid on time at the end of January, against a target of 95 per cent.

It spent 7.3% of its total turnover on agency staff in 2014/5.

In 2017-2018 a Cost Improvement Target of £16.26m was set, with £13m savings achieved. The Trust delivered a deficit of £40.3m which is £3.9m better than the original plan for the year. This is an improvement of £7.0m over the deficit in 2016/17 of £47.3m.

== Performance ==
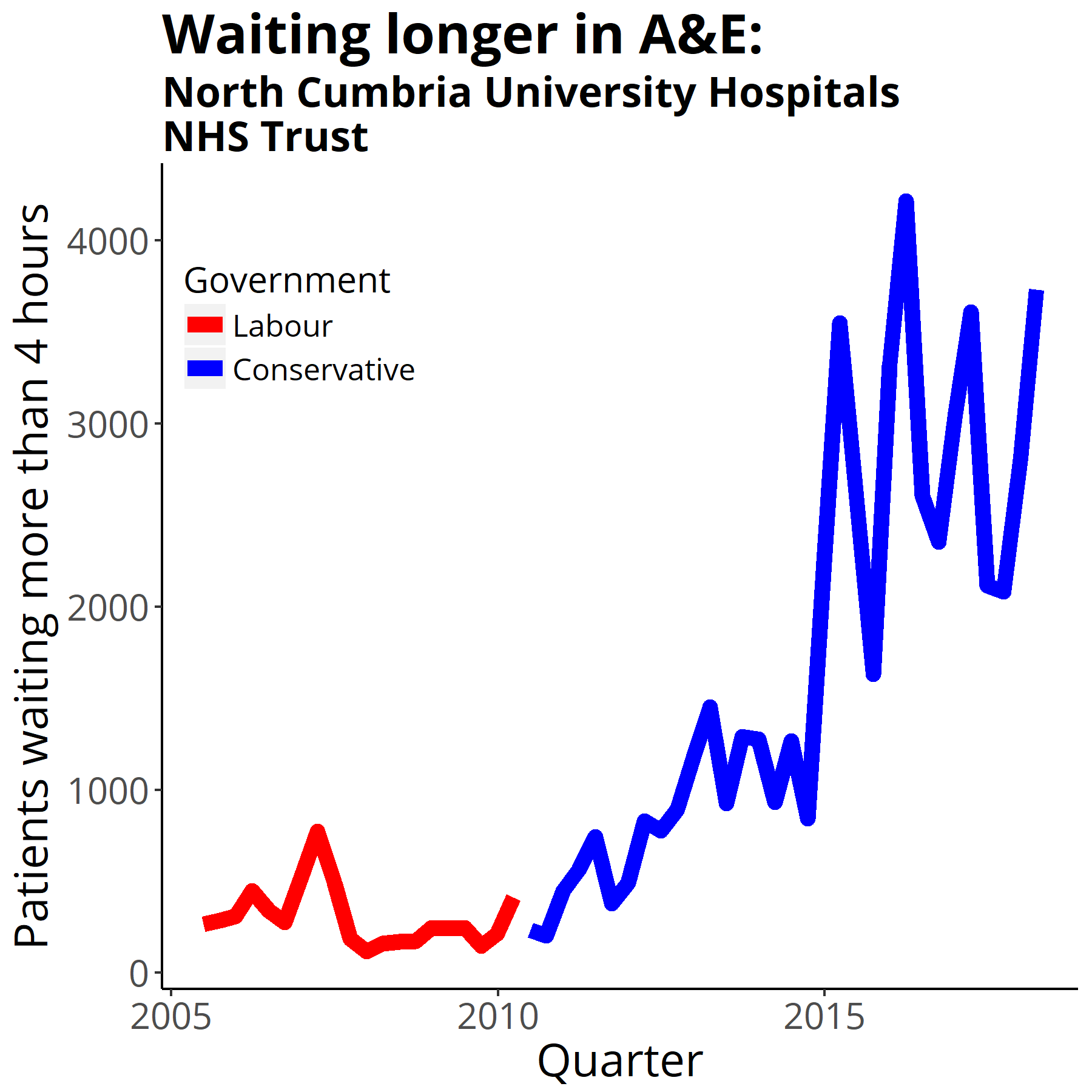
Four-hour target in the emergency department quarterly figures from NHS England Data from https://www.england.nhs.uk/statistics/statistical-work-areas/ae-waiting-times-and-activity/

The Trust was placed in special measures as a result of Sir Bruce Keogh's review of hospital mortality. In October 2013 the Trust was put into the highest risk category by the Care Quality Commission.

In December 2013 the Trust was one of thirteen hospital trusts named by Dr Foster Intelligence as having higher than expected higher mortality indicator scores for the period April 2012 to March 2013 in their Hospital Guide 2013. It was put into a buddying arrangement with Northumbria Healthcare NHS Foundation Trust.

The Trust came out of Special Measures in 2017

== Private Finance Initiative ==
In February 2014 it was reported that the trust board had lost confidence in the maintenance and estates services provided to the Cumberland Infirmary through Health Management Carlisle under the PFI contract after a probe uncovered “major issues” with the way its operating theatres, water systems and gas pipelines were being maintained.

== Staffing ==
In March 2014 it became apparent that the Trust was struggling to retain clinical staff, when three consultants resigned, and as a result junior doctors were removed because there was a lack of consultant supervision. There was a 25 per cent vacancy rate in consultant posts, the equivalent of 50 people, meaning the trust is relying heavily on locums. Nursing gaps at the hospital were said to be so serious they needed daily monitoring.

In June 2014 a senior consultant, Guy Broome, co-chairman of the Trust's Medical Staff Committee resigned his post, questioning the motives of Northumbria Healthcare, wanting to see the merger stopped and other options explored. He claimed his workload has been stripped back since new bosses took over and specialist links to experts in Newcastle had been severed.

== See also ==
- Healthcare in Cumbria
- List of NHS trusts
