= Liverpool Royal Infirmary =

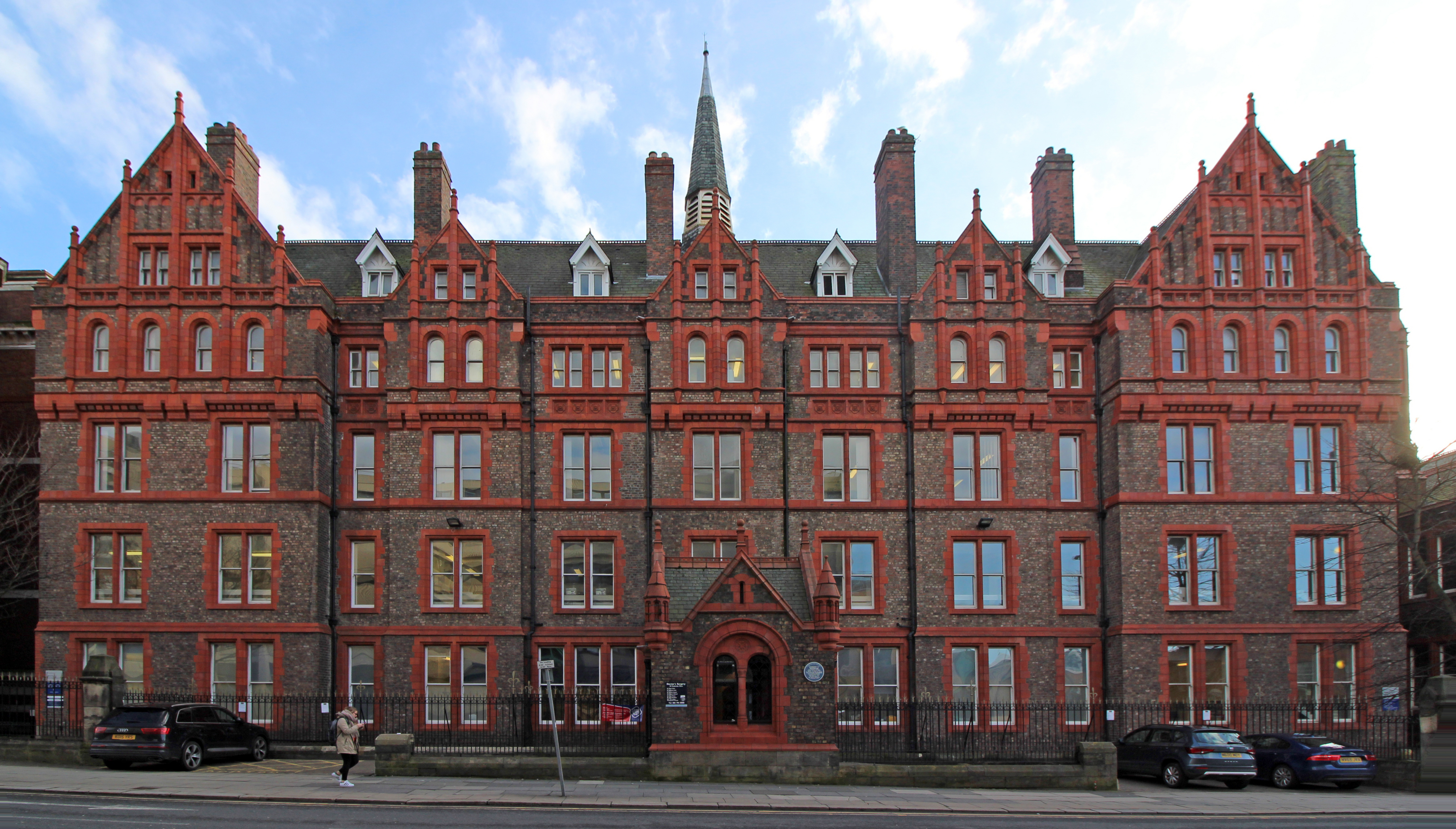
- Main building on Pembroke Place

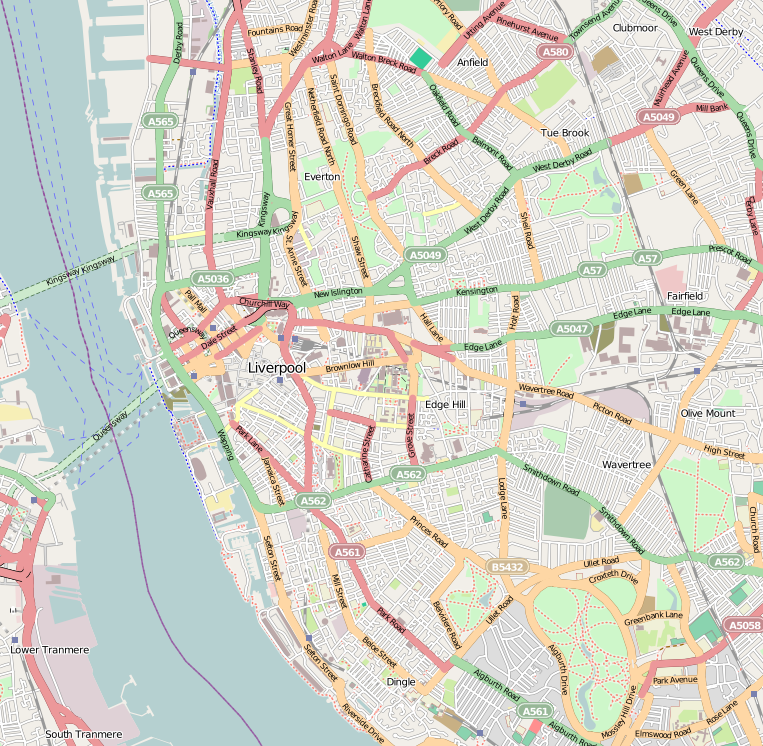
- Location in Liverpool Location in Merseyside

Geography
- Location: Pembroke Place, Liverpool
- Coordinates: 53.409°N 2.968°W

Organisation
- Care system: Public NHS
- Type: Teaching
- Affiliated university: University of Liverpool

History
- Founded: 1743
- Closed: 1978

The Liverpool Royal Infirmary was a hospital in Pembroke Place in Liverpool, England. The building is now used by the University of Liverpool.

== History ==
The infirmary has its origins in a small building on Shaw's Brow which was opened by the 11th Earl of Derby on part of the site which is now occupied by St George's Hall on 25 March 1749.

The second incarnation of the infirmary was designed by John Foster in the Greek Revival style and opened on Brownlow Hill in September 1824. This building was renamed the Liverpool Royal Infirmary after a visit of Queen Victoria to Liverpool in 1851. William Rathbone VI, based on advice from Florence Nightingale, set up the world's first ever district nursing service at this building in 1862. This led to the formation of the Queen's Nursing Institute.

The foundation stone for a third incarnation of the infirmary, a much larger building, was laid by the 15th Earl of Derby in Pembroke Place on 28 October 1887. The new building, this time designed by Alfred Waterhouse in the Romanesque Revival style, opened in November 1889. The foundation stone for a new out-patient building, which incorporated a large hall which could accommodate up to 200 people, was laid by the 17th Earl of Derby on 7 July 1909. This building was designed by James Doyle and was opened by the 6th Earl of Sefton on 29 March 1911. The infirmary joined the National Health Service in 1948.

After services transferred to the new Royal Liverpool Hospital on Prescot Street, the old building (subsequently referred to as the "Waterhouse Building") closed in 1978. The Waterhouse Building was acquired by the University of Liverpool in 1995 and departments that now use it include the Institute of Psychology, Health and Society. It was used by the BBC for filming Casualty 1907 in 2006.

== Notable staff ==
Notable people who have trained and worked at Liverpool Royal Infirmary include:

- Emily 'Margaret' Cummins (1866–1934), Lady Superintendent and Matron (from 1911 until at least 1924) She also trained at The London Hospital under Matron Eva Luckes. In 1924 Margaret Cummins helped arrange what was said to be the first Nurses Service in England. It was held in the Lady Chapel of the Liverpool Cathedral on Sunday, 18 May shortly after the anniversary of the birth of Florence Nightingale.
- John Eyton-Jones (1862-1940), was latterly house surgeon at the infirmary; also an amateur footballer, played as Wales international and for Everton.
- Rosalind Paget (1855–1948), was a niece of William Rathbone VI, a resident of Liverpool and social reformer. Paget was a British Nurse and reformer who co-founded the forerunner to the Chartered Society of Physiotherapy and in the late 1870s did some experience of training at Liverpool Royal Infirmary. Between 1882 and 1884 she formally trained as a nurse at The London Hospital under Matron Eva Luckes. Paget was the first Inspector for the Queen's Nursing Institute, which her uncle was instrumental in establishing.
- Theodora Turner (1907–1999) OBE, ARRC Matron from 1948 to 1953, subsequently Matron St. Thomas' Hospital London from 1955 to 1965 and President of the Royal College of Nursing from 1966 to 1968

== Notable patients ==
Robert Tressell, author of The Ragged-Trousered Philanthropists, died there in 1911.

== Gallery ==
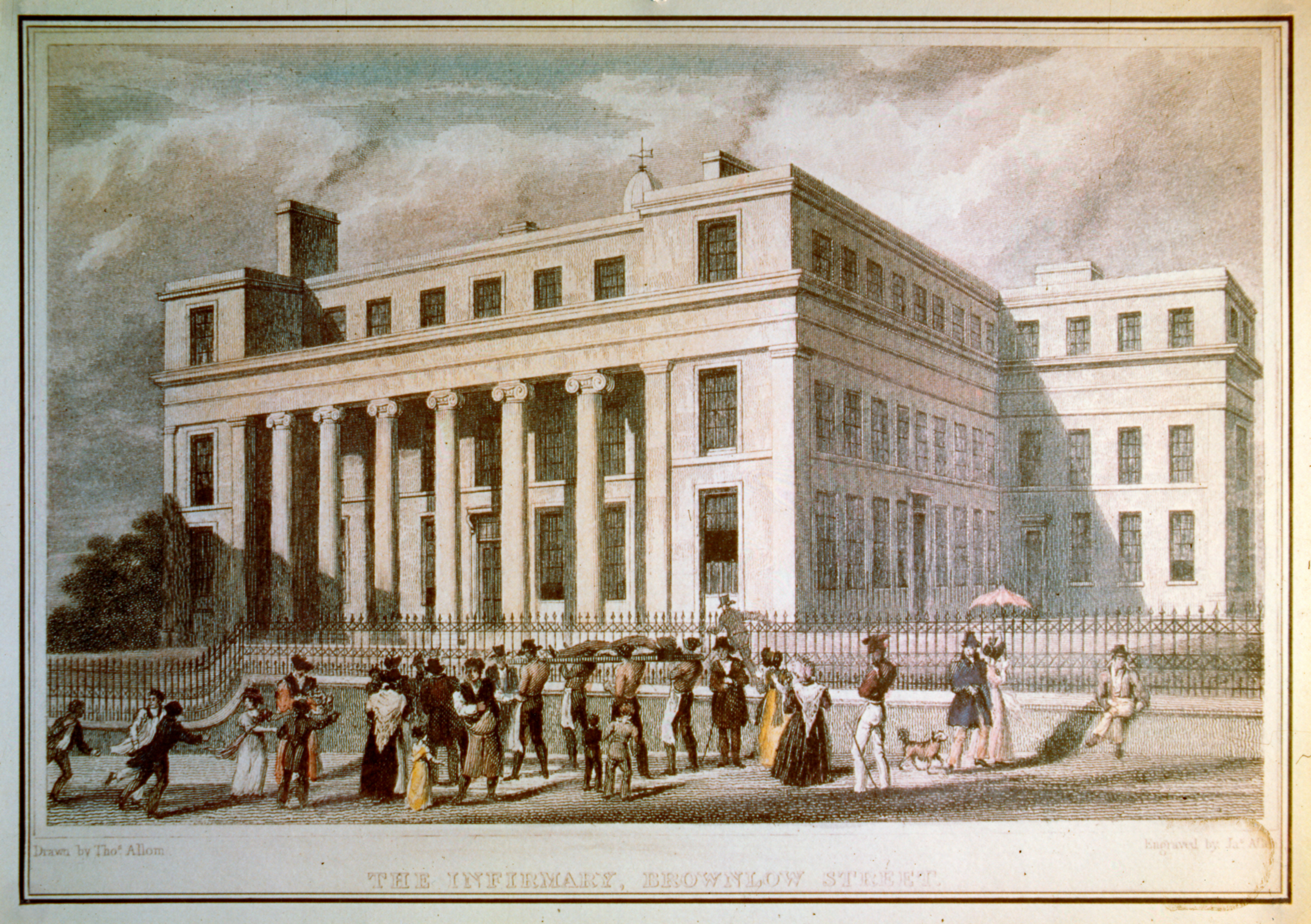
The second incarnation of the infirmary

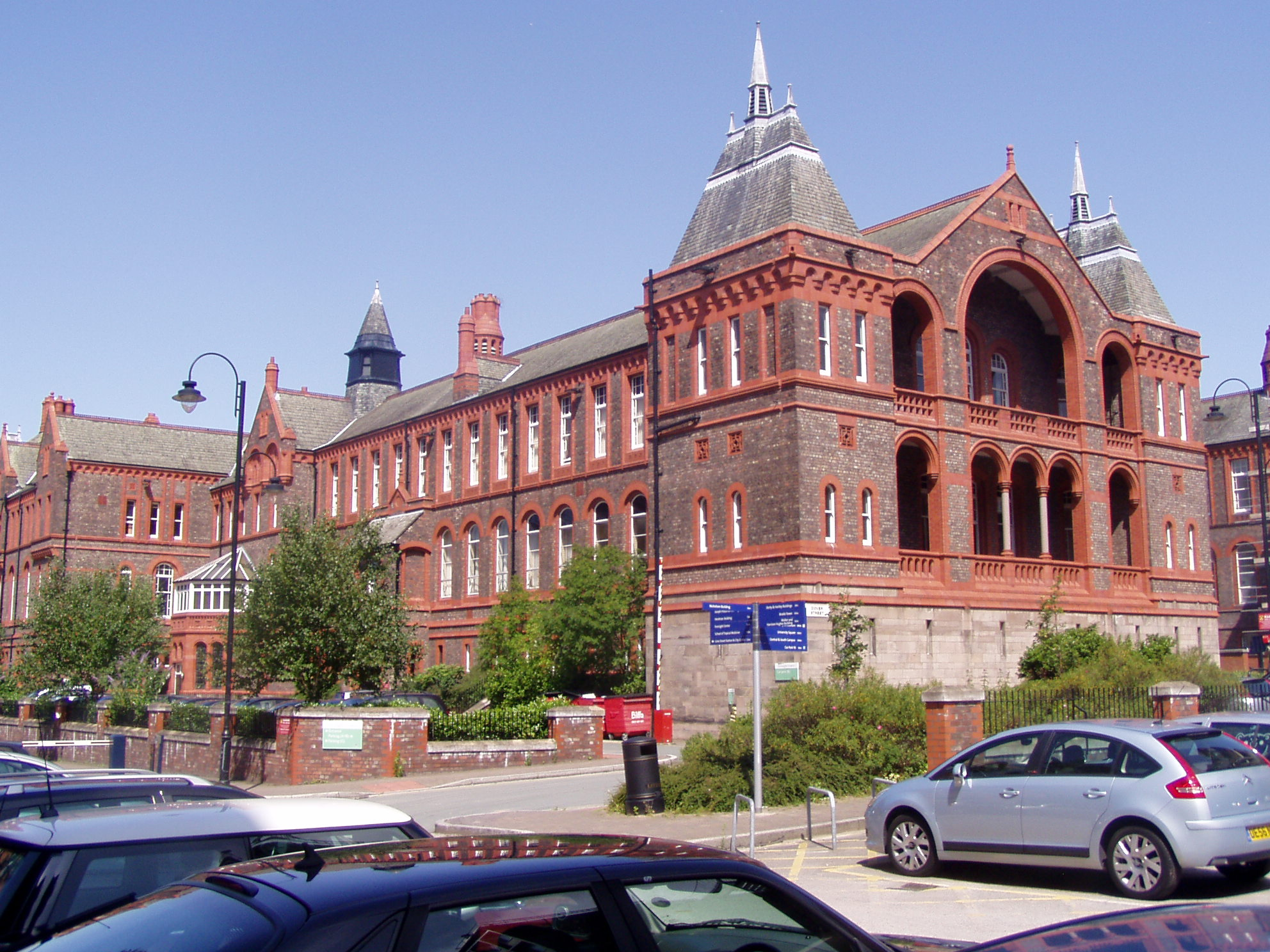
Former ward block at the third incarnation of the infirmary

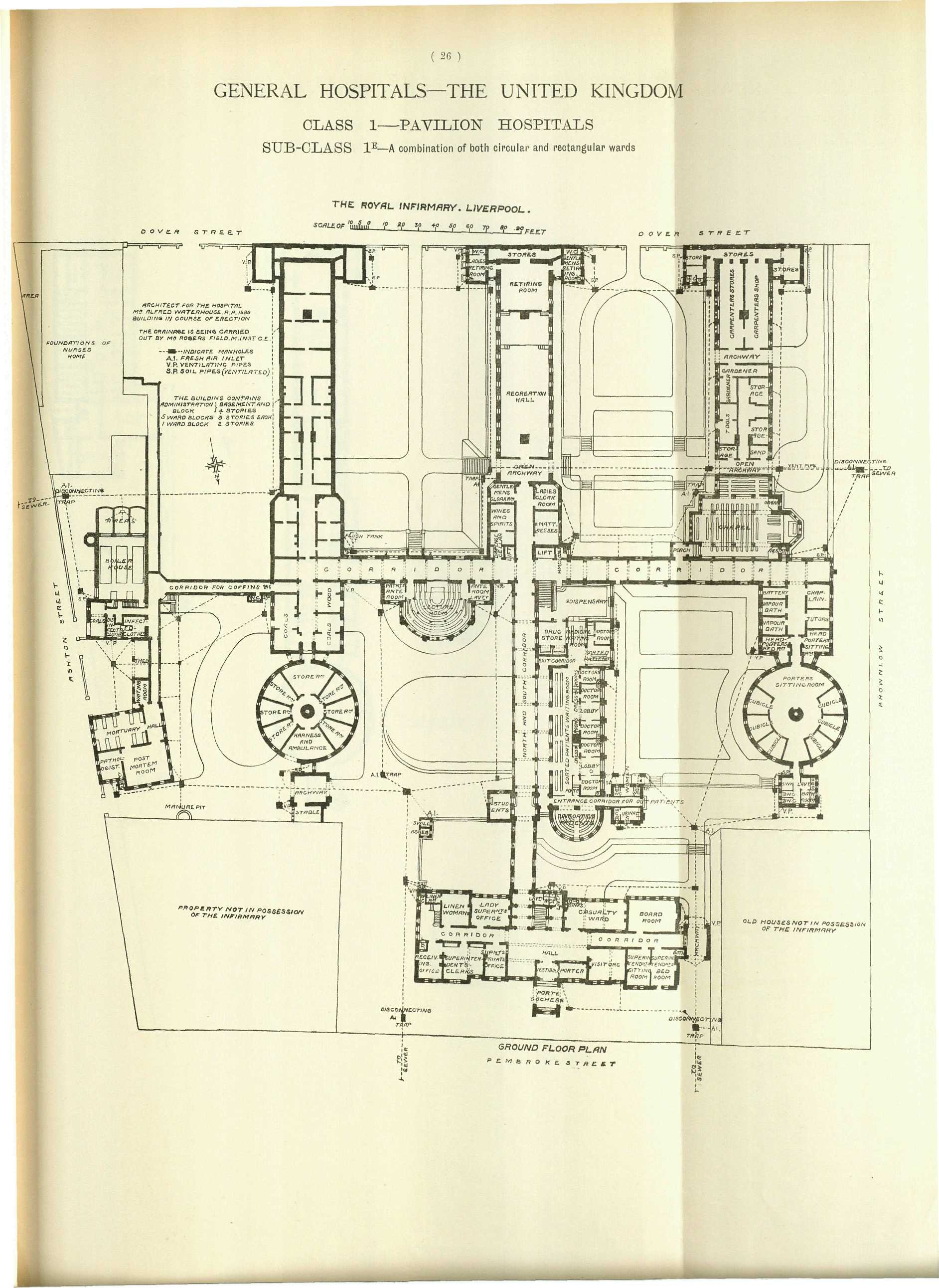
Ground Floor plan of the third incarnation of the infirmary

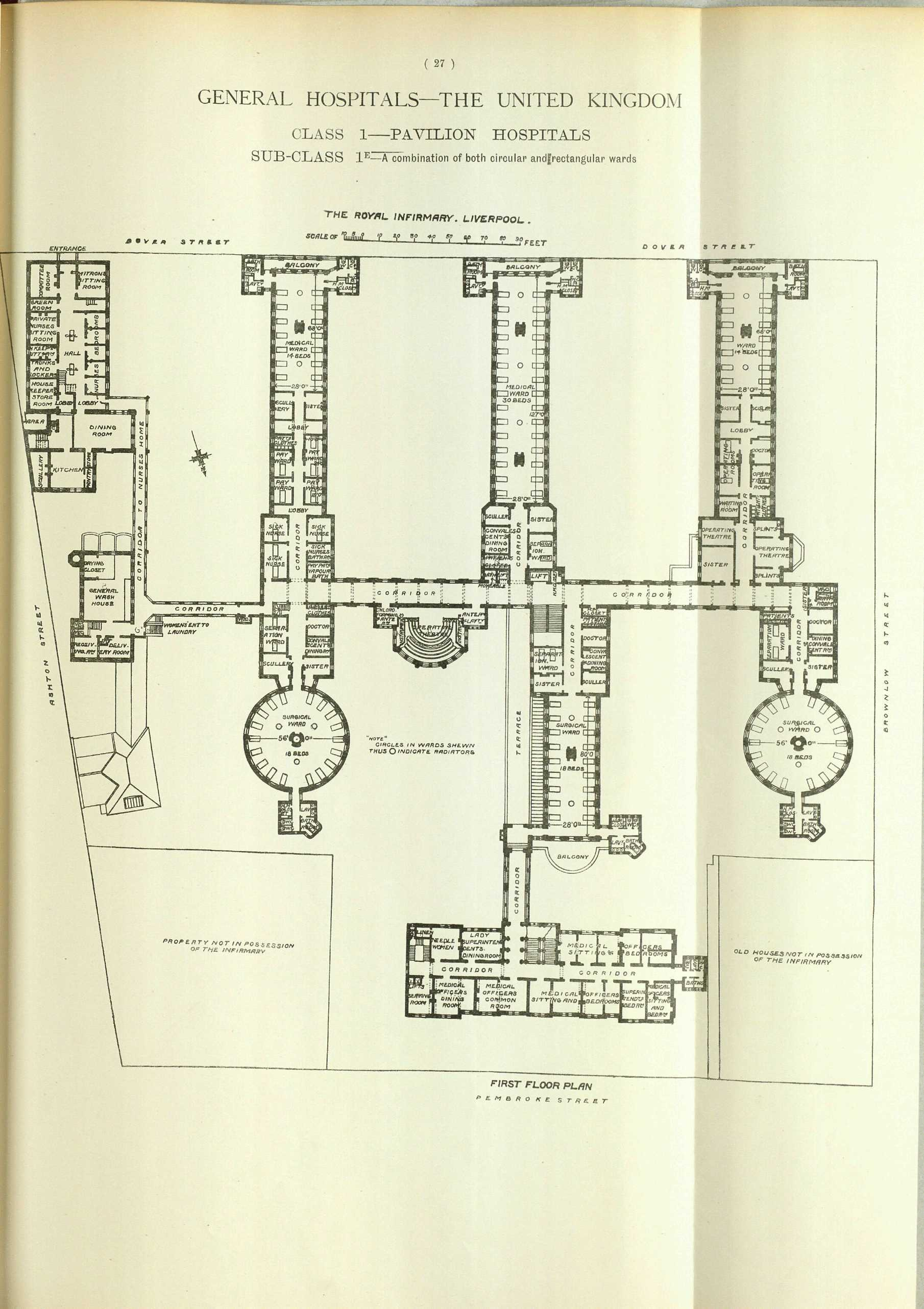
First Floor plan of the third incarnation of the infirmary
