= West Cumberland Hospital =

- North Cumbria Integrated Care NHS Foundation Trust
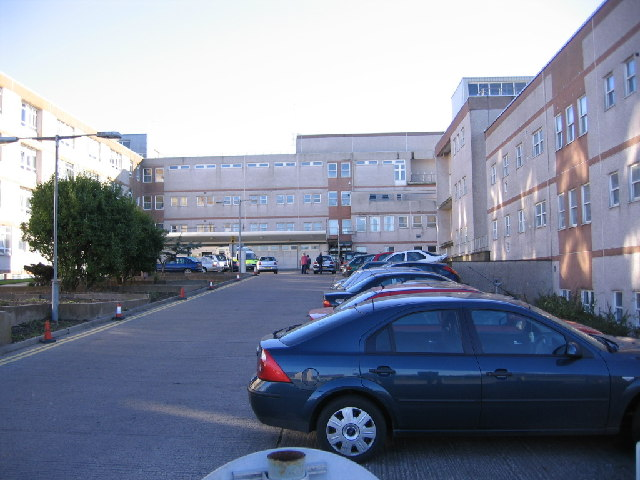
- West Cumberland Hospital

- Location in Copeland Borough Location in Cumbria

Geography
- Location: Whitehaven, Cumbria, England, United Kingdom
- Coordinates: 54.5298°N 3.5628°W

Organisation
- Care system: Public NHS

Services
- Emergency department: Yes

Links
- Website: www.ncumbria.nhs.uk/acute/hospitals/wch.aspx
- Lists: Hospitals in England

West Cumberland Hospital is a hospital in Hensingham, a suburb of Whitehaven in Cumbria, England, and was the first district general hospital to be built in England following the creation of the National Health Service. It is managed by the North Cumbria Integrated Care NHS Foundation Trust. A campaign group is fighting to maintain hospital services at the West Cumberland Hospital, many of which have been moved to the Cumberland Infirmary, 40 mi (64 km) away from the population centres of the West Cumbrian coast.

== History ==
The first hospital in Whitehaven was the old Whitehaven Infirmary at Howgill Street, which was built in 1830. In 1924, the Earl of Lonsdale sold Whitehaven Castle to Herbert Wilson Walker, a local industrialist, who then donated the building to the people of West Cumberland, along with £20,000 to convert it into a new hospital.

By 1951, the hospital needed replacing, and representations were made to the UK Government. In 1957, approval was given to break ground on a new hospital, which was the first district general hospital to be built in England following the creation of the National Health Service. It was officially opened on 21 October 1964 by the Queen Mother. (Note: Whitehaven Castle has since been converted into apartments.)

On 2 June 2010, a major incident was declared at the hospital in the aftermath of the Cumbria shootings. Staff at the hospital dealt with casualties and patients in shock.

The first phase of a rebuilding programme was completed and brought into use in October 2015, at a cost of £90 million. The second phase has been approved (at a cost of about £50 million) and preparation for demolition of those parts being replaced is being undertaken through 2018.

== Downgrading of services ==
A campaign group has been protesting at the removal of services from the West Cumberland Hospital. Much of this care is now provided at the Cumberland Infirmary in Carlisle, 40 mi (64 km) away from the hospital in Whitehaven. A rally at Whitehaven's rugby league ground was attended by 4,000 people in September 2014. The North Cumbria University Hospitals Trust was placed in Special Measures in 2013 by the Care Quality Commission, and this was continued on 10 July 2014.

In September 2015, West North and East Cumbria (the area covered by North Cumbria University Hospitals Trust) became one of three Success Regimes - expedited improvement programs set up by NHS England and intended to fix the most troubled health and social care systems in England. This culminated in a public consultation on the reconfiguration of services, which closed on 19 December 2016. The Cumbria Clinical Commissioning Group acted on the consultation findings on 8 March 2017 with decisions that tried to accommodate the comments made, but still with some downgrading of services.

== See also ==
- Healthcare in Cumbria
- List of hospitals in England
