= North Cumbria Integrated Care NHS Foundation Trust =

- Type: NHS foundation trust
- Established: 1 October 2019
- Hospitals: Cumberland Infirmary; West Cumberland Hospital
- Website: www.ncic.nhs.uk

North Cumbria Integrated Care NHS Foundation Trust was created in October 2019 by a merger between Cumbria Partnership NHS Foundation Trust and North Cumbria University Hospitals NHS Trust. It provides mental health and community services in Cumbria.

It runs Cumberland Infirmary in Carlisle, Cumbria, the birthing unit at Penrith Hospital and West Cumberland Hospital in Whitehaven.

In November 2020 the Care Quality Commission said the trust had an "inexperienced leadership team" which "did not always have the necessary skills and abilities to lead effectively", after issuing a warning notice to improve care in its two emergency departments.
