= Virginia Henderson =

American nurse and writer

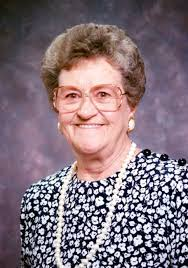
- Born: November 30, 1897; Kansas City, Missouri, U.S.
- Died: March 19, 1996 (aged 98); Branford, Connecticut, U.S.
- Burial place: Bedford County, Virginia, U.S.
- Education: United States Army School of Nursing, 1921; Master's Degree Teachers College, Columbia University, 1934
- Occupations: Nurse, researcher, theorist, writer

Virginia Avenel Henderson (November 30, 1897 – March 19, 1996) was an American nurse, researcher, theorist, and writer.

Henderson is famous for a definition of nursing: "The unique function of the nurse is to assist the individual, sick or well, in the performance of those activities contributing to health or its recovery (or to peaceful death) that he would perform unaided if he had the necessary strength, will or knowledge" (first published in Henderson & Nite 1978, p. 5, 1955 ed.). She is known as "the first lady of nursing" and has been called, "arguably the most famous nurse of the 20th century" and "the quintessential nurse of the twentieth century". In a 1996 article in the Journal of Advanced Nursing Edward Halloran wrote, "Virginia Henderson's written works will be viewed as the 20th century equivalent of those of the founder of modern nursing, Florence Nightingale."

== Early life ==
Henderson was born on November 30, 1897, in Kansas City, Missouri, to Daniel B. Henderson, a lawyer who worked with Native Americans, and Lucy Minor (Abbot) Henderson. She was the fifth of their eight children. She grew up in Bedford County, Virginia, where she received her early education at her grandfather's community boys' school.

== Education and career ==
Henderson's early education was at home in Virginia with her aunts and her uncle at an all-boys school. In 1921, Henderson graduated from the US Army School of Nursing in Washington, D.C. She received a BS in 1931 or 1932 and a Master's degree in 1934 from Teachers College, Columbia University.

Henderson's career in public health nursing began in 1921 at the Henry Street Settlement in Manhattan, New York. She worked for the Visiting Nurse Association of Washington, D.C., from 1921 to 1923. She was the first full-time nursing instructor in Virginia where she worked at the Norfolk Presbyterian Hospital from 1924 to 1929. Henderson taught at Teachers College, Columbia University from 1934 to 1948. In 1953 she became a research associate at Yale School of Nursing transitioning to emeritus status in 1971 continuing to serve in that position until 1996. She also traveled the world throughout her career to help and encourage not only nurses, but other healthcare workers.

She was the author of the 1939 (4th ed.) revision of Bertha Harmer's Textbook of Principles and Practices of Nursing when the original author died. She was co-author for the fifth (1955) and sixth (1978) editions. Until 1975, the fifth edition was the most widely used nursing textbook in English and Spanish. She developed one of the major nursing theories. "Henderson's Model" has been used throughout the world for standardizing nursing practice. The Nursing Studies Index, a twelve-year project she directed, covered the first sixty years of nursing research. It was considered an essential reference for years. Another important publication was, Nursing Research: A Survey and Assessment written with Leo Simmons. Her work is credited with shifting the focus of nursing research "from studying nurses to studying the differences that nurses can make in people's lives." She always told the patients of the nurse's obligations instead of the doctor's obligations, making nurses more beneficial to doctors.

== Honors ==
Henderson has received numerous honors. The International Council of Nurses presented her with the inaugural Christiane Reimann Prize in 1985 considered the most prestigious award in nursing. She was an honorary fellow of the United Kingdom's Royal College of Nursing (FRCN). She was selected to the American Nurses Association Hall of Fame and has received honorary degrees from thirteen universities. She received the Virginia Historical Nurse Leadership Award in 1985. The Virginia Henderson Repository an online resource for nursing research that grew out of the Virginia Henderson International Nursing Library at Sigma Theta Tau is named in her honor. Henderson was recognized as one of fifty-one pioneer nurses in Virginia in 2000.

== Nursing: Need Theory ==
Henderson's theory stresses the priority of patient self-determination so the patient will continue doing well after being released from the hospital. Henderson characterized the nurse's role as substitutive, which the nurse does for the patient; supplementary, which is helping the patient; or complementary, which is engaging with the patient to do something. The role of the nurse helps the patient become an individual again. She arranged nursing tasks into 14 different components based on personal needs. Not only are nurses responsible for the patient, but also to help the patient be themselves when they leave their care. This assures that the patient has fewer obstacles during recovery from being sick or injured, and helping getting back into self-care is easier when a nurse is there to motivate until the patient goes home.

== Death ==
She died in 1996 at age 98 at the Connecticut Hospice in Branford, Connecticut, and was interred in her family's plot of the churchyard of St. Stephen's Church, Forest, Bedford County, Virginia. She is survived by her great niece, Catherine Mark Burdge, a nurse practitioner in Fairfield, Connecticut and a graduate of the Yale School of Nursing.

== Legacy ==
Virginia Henderson's legacy lives on through the continued work of nursing researchers who conduct their nursing research at the Virginia Henderson Center for Nursing Research at Centra Health in Lynchburg, Virginia. The Virginia Henderson Center for Nursing Research is supported through grants provided by Virginia Henderson's family. Each year, the Virginia Henderson Center for Nursing Research holds a Nursing Research conference to showcase the work of these nursing researchers who carry on the legacy of Virginia Henderson.

== Selected publications ==
- — (1935). Medical and Surgical Asepsis. The Nursing Education Bulletin. New York: Dept. of Nursing Education, Teachers College, Columbia University.
- — (1961) [1960]. Basic Principles of Nursing Care. International Council of Nurses (ICN). London: ICN. OCLC 474222238.
- —; Nite, Gladys (1978). Principles and Practice of Nursing. International Council of Nurses. New York: Macmillan. OCLC 1132472175. Henderson was also author of the 1939 revised edition and coauthor of the 4th (1955) edition.
- — (1984). Nursing Studies Index: An Annotated Guide to Reported Studies, Research in Progress, Research Methods and Historical Materials in Periodicals, Books, and Pamphlets Published in English. Volumes I-IV. Yale University Nursing Index Staff. New York: Garland. ISBN 9780824065157. Originally published: V. IV (1963), V. I (1966), V. II (1970), V. III (1972); Philadelphia: JB Lippincott.
- Simmons, Leo W.; — (1964). Nursing Research : A Survey and Assessment. Volumes I-V. New York: Appleton-Century-Crofts. OCLC 451308225.
- — (1991). The Nature of Nursing : A Definition and its Implications for Practice, Research, and Education : Reflections After 25 Years (Rev. and expanded ed.). New York: National League for Nursing Press. ISBN 9780887374944.
- — (1995). Halloran, Edward J. (ed.). A Virginia Henderson Reader : Excellence in Nursing. New York: Springer. ISBN 9780826188304.

== See also ==
- Yale School of Nursing
