= Arthur Colville Kennedy =

Scottish nephrologist

Professor Sir Arthur Colville Kennedy
- Arthur Kennedy
- Born: 23 October 1922; Edinburgh
- Died: 30 December 2009 (aged 87)
- Education: University of Glasgow School of Medicine.
- Awards: CBE, FRCP (1977) FRSE (1984)
- Scientific career
- Fields: Pediatrics, Nephrology
- Workplaces: University of Glasgow

Arthur Colville Kennedy (23 October 1922 in Edinburgh, 30 December 2009 in Glasgow) was a Scottish nephrologist and pioneer of renal dialysis who was the Muirhead Chair of Medicine at the University of Glasgow in 1979. In 1959, Kennedy with the help of urologist Arthur Jacobs, established an adult renal dialysis unit at Glasgow Royal Infirmary. Kennedy was internationally recognised for his pioneering work in researching the causes of kidney disease during the 1960's and 1970's.

== Life ==
Arthur "Ack" Kennedy was born in Edinburgh, the third son in a family of five sons to Thomas and Johanna Kennedy. Kennedy attended Whitehill Secondary School in Glasgow before matriculating at the University of Glasgow School of Medicine.

Kennedy married Agnes Kennedy née Taylor, known as Nancy Kennedy in 1947. Together the couple had two daughters as well as a granddaughter and two grandchildren.

== Career ==
Kennedy completed his MB BCh in 1945. A year later he was conscripted into the Royal Air Force Volunteer Reserve for two years where he helped build a new runway on Barra in the Outer Hebrides (something he was particularly proud of) and left with the rank of Captain. Over the next several years Kennedy took a series of training posts within Glasgow and the West of Scotland where he began specialising in haematology. By 1955 Kennedy had completed his Md thesis with the title "Defective Gas Transport Function of Stored Red Blood Cells: With Observations on the Oxygen Dissociation Curve in Anaemia". In 1957, Kennedy joined the Professorial Medical Unit at Glasgow Royal Infirmary (GRI) as senior lecturer, working for the Muirhead Chair of Medicine (1945-1961) Leslie John Davis (1899-1980).

By the late 1950's, Kennedy's focus began to change when he switched his specialism from haematology into nephrology. Kennedy had noticed that none of the doctors at Glasgow were specialising in nephrology and in particular kidney dialysis, so decided to change his specialism. In 1958, Arthur Henry Jacobs, a consultant urologist and head of department at GRI had received a generous bequest from a patient and he wished to use the money to set renal unit at the infirmary. Kennedy was selected by Jacobs to establish the new unit and decided to buy a dialysis machine. Shortly after, Kennedy met with Frank Maudsley Parsons, a consultant clinical renal physiologist at Leeds General Infirmary to learn how to operate a rotating-drum kidney dialysis machine that was being used in the hospital.

In 1958, Kennedy began establishing an acute kidney failure unit in the basement of the urology department at GRI. By June or July 1959, the unit was ready for the first artificial kidney machine which was ordered by Jacobs. It was similar to the one used by Parsons, made by French manufacturer Societe Usifroid. His early experience in the unit led to him researching Dialysis disequilibrium syndrome that resulted in him developing an effective treatment. In 1962, supported by a fellowship grant, he was able to make a training visit to the United States. He visited kidney dialysis specialist Belding Hibbard Scribner at the University of Washington in Seattle. When he returned, Kennedy purchased a twin-coil kidney dialysis machine and by 1964 began a regular dialysis service for patients, known as maintenance dialysis. In 1964, Kennedy received a grant from Chief Medical Officer, George Godber to contsruct a new building at Glasgow Royal Infirmary for dialysis that included space for laboratories. The first regular dialysis unit was established in the new building in 1966. Throughout the 1960's and 1970's, he used the new Laboratories to research Chronic kidney disease and renovascular disease. (Note: Examples of renovascular disease includes Renal artery stenosis, renal artery thrombosis, Renal vein thrombosis and Atheroembolic renal disease.) Kennedy was able to reduce mortality by renal disease from 100% to 50% in the early years and reduced it to 30% in his later years.

== Societies ==
Kennedy's work was recognised internationally, leading to a appointment as the presidency of the European Dialysis and Transplant Association that began in 1972 and lasting 3 years. The quality of his research and clinical outcomes was recognised by the university when he was appointed to Muirhead Chair of Medicine in 1979. From 1986 to 1988, Kennedy was president of the Royal College of Physicians and Surgeons of Glasgow. From 1987 to 1989, he was chairman of the board of the Professional and Linguistic Assessments Board. In 1991, he was appointed to the presidency of the British Medical Association, traditionally for a year.

== Awards and honors ==
In 1987, he was awarded an Honorary Fellow of the American College of Physicians. In 1988, Kennedy became an Honorary Fellow of the Royal Australasian College of Physicians and an Honorary Royal College of Physicians of Ireland. His final honour, given by the Queen was the Commander of the Most Excellent Order of the British Empire.

== Notes ==
Academic offices
| Preceded by Edward McCombie McGirr | Muirhead Chair of Medicine; 1979–1988 | Succeeded by James Hugh McKillop |
