= Aileen Keel =

Scottish medical doctor and academic

Aileen Keel CBE FRCPath FRCPG FRCPE FRCSE FRCGP

Acting Chief Medical Officer for Scotland
- In office April 2014 – May 2015
- Preceded by: Harry Burns
- Succeeded by: Catherine Calderwood

Deputy Chief Medical Officer for Scotland
- In office July 1999 – April 2014
- Succeeded by: Catherin Calderwood

Personal details
- Born: 12 August 1952 (age 74) Glasgow, Scotland
- Spouse: Paul Dwyer (m.1995-2010)
- Children: 1
- Education: University of Glasgow

Aileen Margaret Keel (born 12 August 1952) is a Scottish medical doctor and academic who is serving as the Director of the Innovative Healthcare Delivery Programme at the University of Edinburgh. She previously served as the Deputy Chief Medical Officer for Scotland from 1999 to 2014 and served as the Acting Chief Medical Officer, until 2015.

Born in Glasgow, she studied medicine at the University of Glasgow Medical School. She worked in general medicine in Glasgow and Aberdeen, when she later moved to London to serve as the Director of Pathology and Consultant Haemotologist at the Cromwell Hospital. She returned to Scotland and served as the Senior Medical Officer at the Scottish Office.

Following Scottish devolution, Keel was appointed the Deputy CMO for Scotland, holding the position until 2014 when she became CMO on an interim basis. She was seconded by the Scottish Government to the University, where she is the Director of the Innovative Healthcare Delivery Programme.

== Early life and education ==
Keel was born in Glasgow on 12 August 1952 to Everina and Walter Keel. She studied medicine at the University of Glasgow graduating with a MB ChB in 1976.

== Career ==
After graduating from university, Keel trained and worked in general medicine and haematology in Glasgow Royal Infirmary, the Royal Hospital for Sick Children, Glasgow and Aberdeen Royal Infirmary. From 1987 to 1989, she was Director of Pathology and Consultant Haematologist at Cromwell Hospital, London. She was an honorary consultant in haematology and research fellow at Central Middlesex and Middlesex hospitals from 1988 to 1992. She returned to Scotland in 1992 to take up with position of Senior Medical Office at the Scottish Office a post she held until her promotion in 1998 to Principal Medical Officer. In 1999 she was promoted to Deputy Chief Medical Officer for Scotland, and from 2014 to 2015 was Acting Chief Medical Officer for Scotland.

Since 2015, Keel has been seconded from the Scottish Government to the University of Edinburgh as Director of the Innovative Healthcare Delivery Programme. She is Chair of the Scottish Cancer Task Force and co-chair of Clinical Outcomes and Measures for Quality Improvement (COMQI).

== Awards and honours ==
- Fellow of the Royal College of Physicians of Glasgow (1992)
- Fellow of the Royal College of Pathologists (1995)
- Fellow of the Royal College of Physicians of Edinburgh (2005)
- CBE in the Birthday Honours list (2008)
- Fellow of the Royal College of Surgeons of Edinburgh (2013)
- Fellow of the Royal College of General Practitioners (2014)
- Honorary Chair, University of Edinburgh
