= Ernest Armstrong =

Ernest Armstrong may refer to:

- Ernest Armstrong (British politician) (1915–1996), British Labour Party politician
- Ernest Howard Armstrong (1864–1946), Canadian politician and journalist
- Ernest Frederick Armstrong (1878–1948), Canadian politician, soldier and dental surgeon
- Ernest Macalpine Armstrong (born 1945), Scottish general practitioner
