= University of Glasgow School of Medicine, Dentistry & Nursing =

Medical school of the University of Glasgow, Scotland

Coordinates: 55.872°N 4.288°W

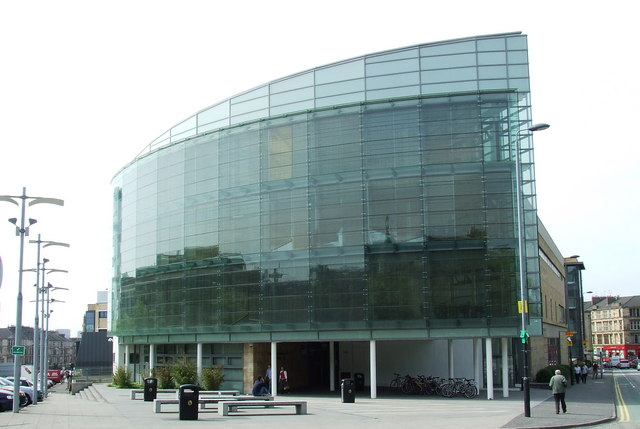
- The Wolfson Medical School Building
- Type: Medical school
- Established: 1751
- Affiliations: University of Glasgow
- Heads of the School of Medicine: Matthew Walters
- Students: 2,851 (2021/22)
- Undergraduates: 2,363 (2021/22)
- Postgraduates: 488 (2021/22)
- Location: Glasgow, Scotland
- Campus: Wolfson Medical School Building, University Avenue, University of Glasgow, G12 8QQ
Colours
- Website: www.gla.ac.uk/schools/medicine/

The University of Glasgow School of Medicine, Dentistry & Nursing is the medical school of the University of Glasgow, Scotland, and is one of the largest in Europe, offering a 5-year MBChB degree course. The School of Medicine uses lecture-based learning, problem-based learning and Glasgow's case-based learning.

The medical school in 2025 was ranked 3rd in the UK by The Times University Guide, 7th by the Complete University Guide, and 13th by The Guardian University Guide. It also ranked 50th in the world by both the Times Higher Education World University Rankings and the QS World University Rankings in the same year.

== History ==
The University of Glasgow School of Medicine has a history dating back to its seventeenth-century beginnings. Achievements in medical science include contributions from renowned physicians such as Joseph Lister (antisepsis), George Beatson (breast cancer), John Macintyre (X-rays and radiology), William Hunter (anatomy and obstetrics) and Ian Donald (ultrasound). In addition to achievements in medical science, the school has produced distinguished literary figures such as Tobias Smollett and AJ Cronin.

Robert Mayne was appointed the Professor of Medicine in 1637 and held this post until 1645. After a lapse of almost 70 years, John Johnstoun MD was appointed in 1714. However, the modern School of Medicine did not come into being until 1751, when William Cullen was appointed Professor of Medicine.

The School of Medicine (and the rest of the university) moved from their original location in High Street, to Gilmorehill in the city's west end in 1870. This came after nearly 40 years of discussions about the future of the school, which was growing in size and reputation throughout the nineteenth century. Eventually, in 1864, the university purchased 43 acres in Gilmorehill for £65,000, leaving the old site available for the construction of College Goods Station.

In 1996, the School of Medicine introduced a new curriculum. In response to the GMC document 'Tomorrow's Doctors', the new course was integrated and delivered by problem-based learning.

In 2002, the School of Medicine moved into the purpose built Wolfson Medical School Building located at the bottom of University Avenue, designed by Reiach and Hall. In 2005, it was included in the Prospect 100 best modern Scottish buildings rankings.

In 2009 the school received an award for Excellence in Learning and Education at the inaugural BMJ awards.

In 2010, due to changes in the structure of the NHS and the university, the School of Medicine delivered a new medical course, meeting the recommendations of TD3 and producing graduates more equipped in working and leading in health-care systems around the work. As a result, the most formidable change was the introduction of a course which incorporated all current forms of teaching, moving away from a Problem-based Learning core of teaching.

Students are introduced to clinical scenarios from the beginning of their education. Facilities include areas for developing clinical skills and a fully equipped ward housed in the award-winning Wolfson Medical School Building.

The Nursing & Healthcare School delivers Bachelor and Master of Nursing degree programmes.

== Research ==
The School of Medicine is one of three schools in the University of Glasgow's Biomedical Territory, which also includes the School of Biological and Life Sciences, and Veterinary Medicine. The Biomedical Territory is home to more than 485 academic staff, including approximately 160 clinicians. The territory's research awards since 2001 have exceeded £638M, including investment of over £77M in capital infrastructure.

=== Triangle of Excellence ===
The British Heart Foundation Glasgow Cardiovascular Research Centre, the Glasgow Biomedical Research Centre, and the Wolfson Medical School Building form a "triangle of excellence", enhancing Glasgow's position at the hub of the molecular genetics revolution which is transforming medicine and therapeutics.

The British Heart Foundation Glasgow Cardiovascular Research Centre, core funded by a gift of £5M from the British Heart Foundation, provides experimental and clinical facilities to further research into cardiovascular disease.

== Curriculum structure ==
The MBChB programme in Glasgow is based on integration of clinical and preclinical subjects, and on student-centred learning. The programme is based around vertical themes that comprise the basic disciplines of medicine, such as anatomy and physiology, pathology and microbiology, clinical medicine and clinical surgery. Teaching methods include lectures, tutorials, problem-based learning, practical laboratory sessions and clinical bedside teaching.

The programme has four phases.

=== Phase 1 ===
Phase 1 takes up most of the first semester. This is a broad sweep of biomedical subjects, and early clinical and vocational skills. During this phase the student acquires the fundamentals of biomedical science, and the skills necessary for self-directed learning. The themes covered in this section include homeostasis, basic anatomy, physiology and biochemistry, and the fundamentals of health and illness in communities.

=== Phase 2 ===
Phase 2 takes up the second half of first year and all of second year. It is a system-based, integrated approach to biomedical sciences and basic clinical problems relating to individual systems.

=== Phase 3 ===
Phase 3 takes up the first half of third year, during which time the student learns the basics of pathology, covering a speciality a week. For example, a week on G.I. pathology, a week on haematology and a week on respiratory pathology. During this time there are weekly visits to either a G.P. or hospital. This is combined with more in-depth teaching on the principles of medicine and surgery, the pathological basis of disease, and clinical investigation and laboratory analysis, including radiology, clinical biochemistry, pathology and microbiology.

During the summer vacations after third and fourth years the student undertakes two four-week periods of elective study. These are in subjects and locations of choice and are designed to develop individual interests and to experience medical environments other than those provided on the programme.

The top 20% of students after year three have the option of completing an additional intercalated degree before entering year four.

=== Phase 4 ===
Phase 4 comprises the second half of year three and years four and five. This is the final part of the programme during which the student is attached to clinical specialities, including obstetrics and gynaecology, child health, psychological medicine, general practice, and more specialised aspects of medicine and surgery. During this phase most of the time is spent in hospital attachments in Glasgow and in the wider West of Scotland, and learning the clinical and practical skills necessary to work as a junior doctor.

=== Clinical skills and vocational studies ===
Medical students have contact with patients from early on in the medical degree programme. Training in communication and clinical skills starts in Year 1, while vocational studies assist students in the acquisition of professional skills and attributes, standards and behaviour.

== Wolfson Medical School Building ==
The Wolfson Medical School Building opened in September 2002, designed by Reiach and Hall Architects at a cost of £9m. It was designed to accommodate the problem-based learning curriculum. As well as three small lecture rooms (with capacity for around eighty people in each) and ten PBL Rooms, facilities include:

=== School library ===
The Walton Foundation Library and Resource Area occupies three levels of the building and is open to medical students 24 hours a day, 7 days a week. It accomodates 113 computers with flat screen displays for medical students. As well as 120 study carrels (booths), some with flat-screen computers, students have access video recorders and DVD players for watching clinical skills materials, over 4000 books (including multiple copies of core texts), CD-ROMs and computer-aided learning packages. There are six project rooms.

=== Clinical skills ===
Clinical skills is made up from a fully equipped ward and side rooms complete with audio visual equipment, allowing students to document, analyse and improve their performance. This area also contains Harvey (a cardiology patient simulator which can help students to diagnose cardiac abnormalities) and Sim-man (a life support patient simulator).

=== The Vocational Studies Suite ===
In Vocational Studies, students acquire professional skills and attributes. In the Vocational Studies Suite medical students can practise consulting in a realistic environment, interacting with actors in the roles of patients. The suite comprises 10 small group learning rooms equipped with audiovisual technology as well as two soft seating pre-consultation ‘waiting’ areas for the simulated patients. In addition, there is a resource room with teaching materials and videos.

Consulting rooms are positioned adjacent to small group learning rooms, where their classmates and tutors can observe their simulated consultations on a TV monitor. These rooms also provide the opportunity for student-tutor encounters over a period of time that are essential to professional development.

As well as communication skills, the Vocational Studies Suite is a base from which ethics, professional development and other aspects of doctors’ behaviour and attitudes are explored.

=== The Atrium ===
The central triangle of the medical school, covered by a glass roof and with its own café and seating area.

== Associated hospitals ==
Hospitals that are associated with the Medical School include:

- Ayrshire Central Hospital
- Dykebar Hospital
- Dumfries and Galloway Royal Infirmary
- Falkirk Royal Infirmary
- Gartnavel General Hospital
- Gartnavel Royal Hospital
- Glasgow Royal Infirmary
- Golden Jubilee University National Hospital
- Inverclyde Royal Hospital
- Leverndale Hospital
- Parkhead Hospital
- Princess Royal Maternity Hospital
- Queen Elizabeth University Hospital
- Queen Mother's Maternity Hospital
- Royal Alexandra Hospital
- Ravenscraig Hospital
- Royal Hospital for Children
- Stobhill Hospital
- Stirling Royal Infirmary
- University Hospital Ayr
- University Hospital Crosshouse
- University Hospital Hairmyres
- University Hospital Monklands
- University Hospital Wishaw

== Notable alumni ==
Past students of the University of Glasgow School of Medicine include:

- William Cullen (1710–1790) - physician and chemist.
- William Hunter (1718–1783) - anatomist and obstetrician.
- Tobias George Smollett (1721–1771) - novelist and physician.
- Joseph Black (1728–1799) - chemist and physician.
- Joseph Lister (1827–1912) - physician.
- Murdoch Cameron (1845–1930) - obstetrician.
- Sir William MacEwen (1848–1924) - surgeon.
- John Glaister Snr (1856–1932) - Regius Professor of Forensic Medicine.
- John Glaister Jnr (1892–1971) - Regius Professor of Forensic Medicine.
- Marion Gilchrist (1864–1952) - ophthalmologist.
- Elizabeth Chesser (1877–1940) - physician, medical journalist
- Marbai Ardesir Vakil (1868- c.1948) - physician.
- Dame Anne Louise McIlroy (1878–1968) - gynaecologist and obstetrician.
- John Boyd Orr (1880–1971) - nutritionist.
- Osborne Henry Mavor (1888–1951) Dramatist, GP and Professor of Medicine at Anderson's College.
- Archibald Joseph Cronin (1896–1981) (GP and novelist; author of The Citadel and The Stars Look Down)
- Ian Donald (1910–1987) - obstetrician and pioneer of medical ultrasound.
- Lady Isobel Barnett (1918–1980) TV and radio personality.
- Mary Sheila Christian (1924–1997) - A&E physician and surgeon.
- James Scott (1924–2006) - obstetrician and gynaecologist.
- Dickson Mabon (1925–2008) Scottish Labour and Liberal Democrat politician
- RD Laing (1927–1989) - psychiatrist
- Stuart Campbell - obstetrician and developer of 3D ultrasound
- Ernest Macalpine ("Mac") Armstrong (Chief Medical Officer for Scotland, 2000–2005)
- Harry Burns (Chief Medical Officer for Scotland, 2005–present)
- Sir Kenneth Calman (Chief Medical Officer for Scotland, 1989–1991; Chief Medical Officer, United Kingdom of England, 1991–1998; Vice Chancellor and Warden of Durham University, 1998–2007; Chancellor of the University of Glasgow, 2007–present
- Liam Fox (Conservative politician; Defence Secretary; MP for Woodspring)
- Emeli Sandé (Scottish R&B and soul recording artist and songwriter)

== Awards ==
In May 2020, the School of Medicine, Dentistry and Nursing was awarded an Athena SWAN Silver Award.
