= Mary Christian =

Mary Christian may refer to:

- Mary Christian (née Perry, 1889–2003), American supercentenarian from Massachusetts
- Mary Christian (politician) (1924–2019), American educator and politician
- Mary Sheila Christian (1924–1997), British emergency physician and surgeon
