= Lancaster Medical School =

UK academic institution

- Type: Medical school
- Established: 2006
- Parent institution: Lancaster University (Faculty of Health and Medicine)
- Head: Marina Anderson
- Students: c. 650
- Location: Lancaster, Lancashire, UK; 54°00′37″N 2°47′08″W
- Website: www.lancaster.ac.uk/lms/

Lancaster Medical School (LMS) is located in Lancaster, Lancashire in North West England and is part of the Faculty of Health and Medicine at Lancaster University. Its first graduates, a cohort of 31, graduating in 2011. The current head of the medical school is Professor Marina Anderson.

== History ==
LMS admitted its first cohort of students in 2006 and, from September 2006 to July 2013, it delivered the University of Liverpool School of Medicine MBChB degree curriculum to 50 undergraduate students per year. In November 2012, the General Medical Council approved LMS's request to begin delivering its own medical degree independently from the University of Liverpool. Students beginning their studies from September 2013 are registered as Lancaster University students and are awarded a Lancaster University degree.

== Curriculum ==
The five year MBChB degree is taught using a problem-based learning (PBL) curriculum. Whilst the University of Liverpool School of Medicine discontinued PBL as the mainstay of its curriculum in 2014, LMS has retained and updated its own PBL curriculum. LMS Students sit their final examinations at the end of Year 4, which is followed, during the summer, by the Elective (medical) period.

The School also offers a one-year foundation course, and in 2018 began teaching a new degree in sports and exercise science, described as one of the first in the UK to be delivered by a medical school.

== Clinical Placements ==
Clinical placements for students in years 2 to 5 are arranged by the University Hospitals of Morecambe Bay NHS Trust. As well as the time spent in hospitals (mainly the Royal Lancaster Infirmary and Furness General Hospital in Barrow-in-Furness), students spend around a third of their clinical contact time in the community. Primary care placements are based in general practices across the Cumbria and North Lancashire region, with the North Lancashire Primary Care Trust and the Lancashire Care NHS Trust providing mental health placements. The proportion of time spent in placements ranges from 38% in year 2 to 100% in year 5

== Student Admission ==
The current number of places is 125 per year, with 4 places reserved for international (non-EU) students. There are three entry routes into the MBChB degree course; A-level or equivalent qualification, Science undergraduate degree and Access to Medicine course, such as Lancaster University's own Pre-Medical Studies course. LMS introduced the BioMedical Admissions Test (BMAT) for the admission of students starting in September 2016. LMS use the University Clinical Aptitude Test (UCAT) as of 2024.
