= Gregor Smith =

Scottish general practitioner

Sir Gregor Smith
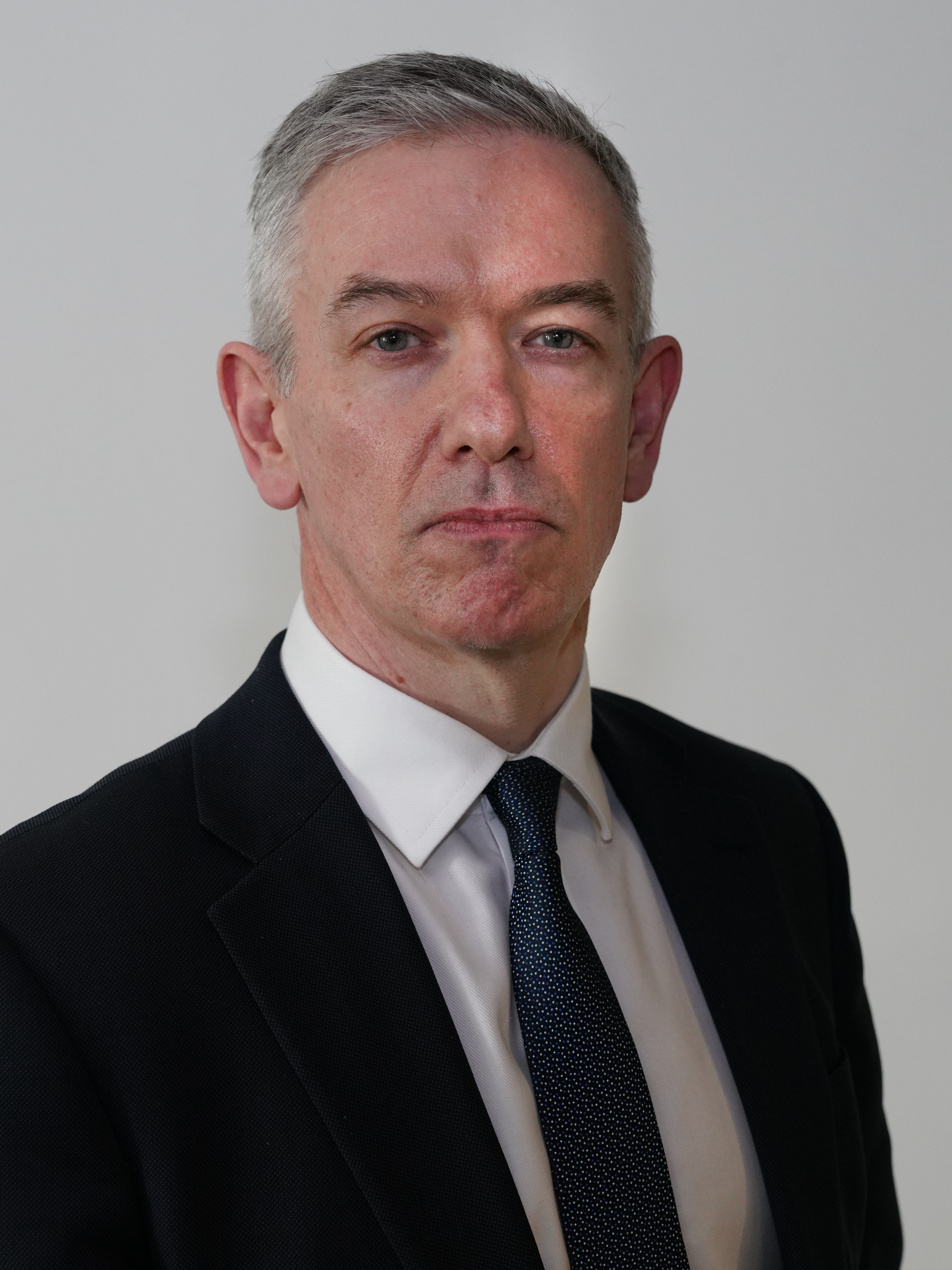
- Official portrait, 2020

Chief Medical Officer for Scotland
- Incumbent
- Assumed office 23 December 2020; Interim: 5 April 2020 – 23 December 2020
- Preceded by: Catherine Calderwood

Personal details
- Born: Gregor Ian Smith
- Education: University of Glasgow
- Occupation: General practitioner (GP)

Professor Sir Gregor Ian Smith is a Scottish general practitioner (GP) and former medical director for primary care in NHS Lanarkshire who has served as the Chief Medical Officer for Scotland since December 2020. He previously served in the position of Deputy Chief Medical Officer and from April 2020, until his appointment, served as Chief Medical Officer on an interim basis.

A medicine graduate of the University of Glasgow Medical School, Smith served as a general practitioner doctor in Larkhall. He served as the Director for Primary Care at NHS Lanarkshire, before being appointed Deputy Chief Medical Officer for Scotland in 2015. On 5 April 2020 he served in the position of CMO on an interim basis, following the resignation of Dr Catherine Calderwood. Smith was confirmed on a permanent basis on 23 December 2020.

== Early life and education ==
Smith was born to a "working class family" and had long pursued a career in medicine and healthcare. He claimed that he had "always wanted to become a doctor and help people" and stated that he realised his ambition to become a doctor whilst attending primary school in "Primary 5 or Primary 6". He was inspired to become a GP after he saw his own GP "giving back to the community" and this was something that he "wanted to emulate". Smith said that when he was younger he knew he "didn't just want to be a doctor, he wanted to be a GP".

Smith attended Uddingston Grammar School and studied medicine at University of Glasgow, becoming the first person in his family to attend university, graduating in 1994. Smith is a prominent advocate for continuous quality improvement and innovation in healthcare, and has a particular interest in person-centred care, shared decision making and working in teams. He is an advocate for NHS principles, universal healthcare, and access to careers within medicine and healthcare to those from all backgrounds.

== Career ==
=== General practice ===
Smith worked as a general practitioner doctor in Larkhall for fifteen years as well as serving as the Director for Primary Care within NHS Lanarkshire. Smith is an Honorary Clinical Associate Professor at the University of Glasgow and Fellow of both the Scottish Patient Safety Programme and Salzburg Global.

Smith began working with the Scottish Government in 2012 when he was appointed part of a body to negotiate Scottish GP contracts and went onto lead developments in the creation of a new quality framework for general practice in Scotland.

=== Deputy Chief Medical Officer for Scotland ===
Smith was appointed as Deputy Chief Medical Officer for Scotland in 2015, serving with Catherine Calderwood who was appointed Chief Medical Officer.

=== Chief Medical Officer for Scotland ===
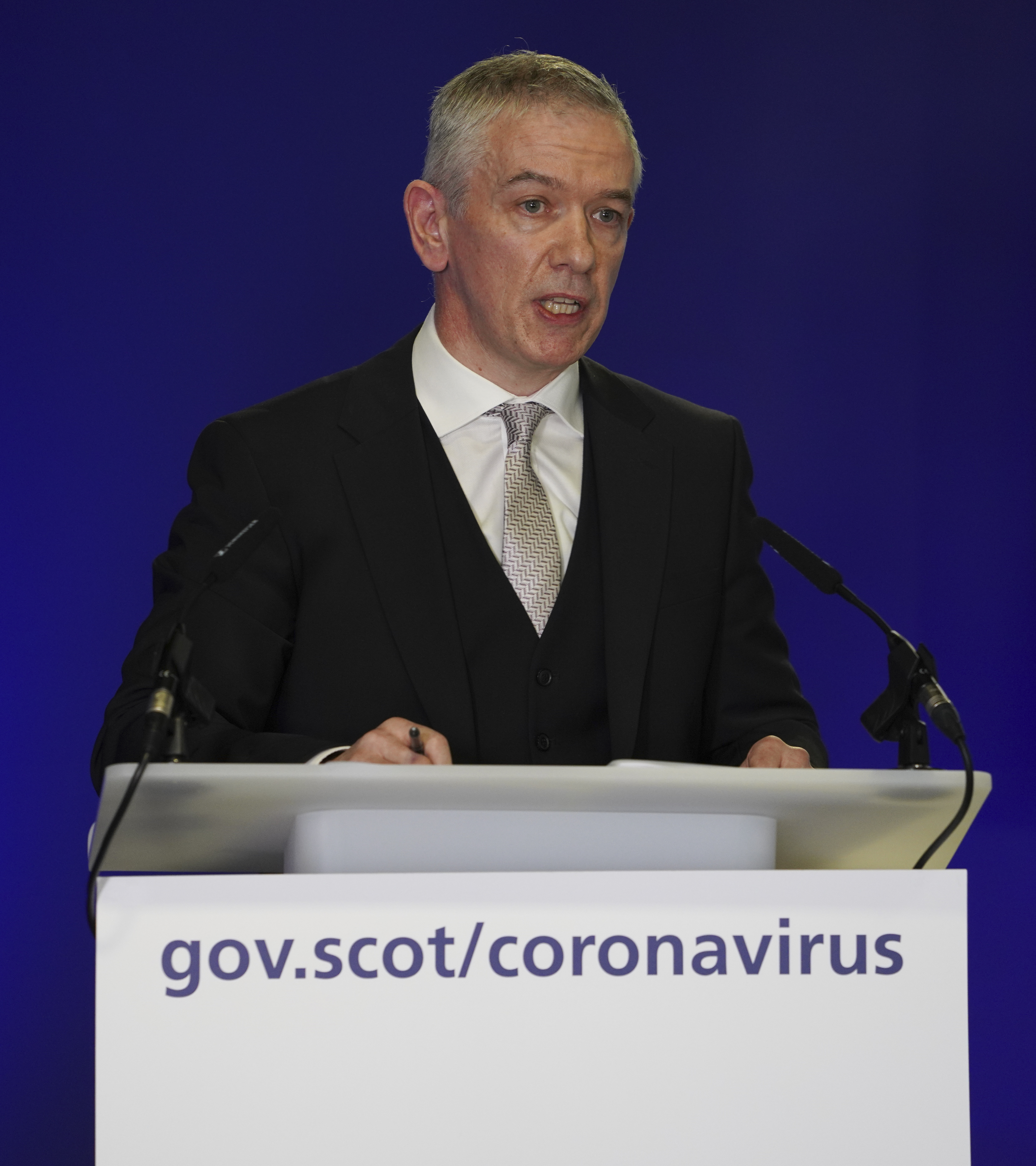
Smith at a press conference at Bute House in response to the Covid-19 pandemic in Scotland, December 2021

Following the sudden resignation of Calderwood in April 2020, Smith was requested by the Scottish Government to act as interim Chief Medical Officer for Scotland, taking a lead role in the Scottish Government response to COVID-19 pandemic in Scotland.

Smith took part in his first Scottish Government press briefing on 6 April 2020 at St Andrew's House in Edinburgh, alongside First Minister of Scotland Nicola Sturgeon and Cabinet Secretary for Health and Sport, Jeane Freeman.

Smith was confirmed as the permanent job holder in December 2020. He was knighted in the 2022 New Year Honours for services to public health. As Chief Medical Officer for Scotland, Smith is the principal medical adviser to the Scottish Government and the Scottish Minister and has responsibility for policy advice to Scottish Ministers on healthcare and public health, leading medical and public health professionals to improve mental and physical wellbeing, providing clinical advice on professional standards and guidelines, conducting research concerning NHS Scotland and promoting careers in the health sector.

== Memberships ==
Smith is a Fellow of the Scottish Patient Safety Programme and was formerly Chair of the West of Scotland Faculty of RCGP. Currently, he is an Honorary Clinical Associate Professor at the University of Glasgow.

== Personal life ==
Smith participates in running during his spare time and is also a keen cyclist. He is an advocate of physical activity and its associated benefits, stating he "believes getting outdoors can help improve people’s physical, mental and social health". He was awarded a knighthood in the Queen’s New Year Honours list in 2022 for services to public health and is an Honorary Professor of the University of Glasgow.

Government offices
Preceded by Catherine Calderwood	Chief Medical Officer for Scotland; 2020–present	Incumbent
