= Titcombe =

Titcombe is an English surname. Notable people with the surname include:

- Charlie Titcombe (born 2001), English rugby union player
- James Titcombe (fl. 2008), British patient safety specialist
