= James Titcombe =

British patient safety specialist

James Roger Titcombe OBE is a patient safety specialist. He was previously, from October 2013 to March 2016, the National Advisor on Patient Safety, Culture & Quality for the Care Quality Commission.

Earlier in his career he was project manager in the nuclear industry. His baby son Joshua died of sepsis at Freeman Hospital nine days after his birth at Furness General Hospital in November 2008. James refused to accept the initial explanations he and his wife were given by University Hospitals of Morecambe Bay NHS Trust for Joshua's death and made an official complaint about his treatment. He got no apology from the Trust until nearly 17 months after the event. In March 2011 a police investigation into Joshua's death was launched. It later included the deaths of 18 other babies and two mothers at the hospital. There was also an independent investigation by Dr Bill Kirkup into the maternity unit. The Parliamentary and Health Service Ombudsman eventually investigated the way his complaints had been dealt with and made recommendations which Titcombe supported, "in particular the need for honestly and robust incident investigation following avoidable harm or death in the NHS" using techniques for which staff were properly trained.

Jeremy Hunt credits him as the inspiration for the establishment of the Healthcare Safety Investigation Branch.

He draws heavily on his own experience in speaking about quality improvement in the NHS. He reports sadly that "I'll Datix you", is used as a threat in argumentative situations in the NHS.

In December 2015, his book Joshua's Story: Uncovering the Morecambe Bay NHS Scandal was published. In September 2024, actor and filmmaker Jamie Thomas King, himself the father of a child who died in infancy due to failures in the National Health System, announced that he was adapting the book into a screenplay.

After the publication of the Ockenden Review in 2020 he was still demanding that NHS adverts move away from messages that promote the role of midwives as ‘guardians of normal birth’.

== Work and honours ==
Titcombe was appointed an OBE in the Queen's Birthday Honours 2015 for services to patient safety.

In 2019 he served as a member of the Parliamentary and Health Service Ombudsman Expert Advisory Panel.

In 2020, Titcombe was appointed as a Specialist Advisor to The Independent East Kent Maternity investigation, headed up by Dr Bill Kirkup. The Inquiry was started as a result of the inquest into Harry Richford that showed gross failings and that his death was "wholly avoidable".

As of 2026 Titcombe serves as the Policy and Patient Safety consultant for Baby Lifeline, and is an Associate Editor for the Journal of Patient Safety and Risk Management.

== See also ==
- Furness General Hospital scandal
