= Edward McCombie McGirr =

Edward McCombie McGirr CBE FRSE (15 June 1916 – 12 May 2003) was Muirhead professor of medicine at Glasgow Royal Infirmary, a former President of the Royal College of Physicians and Surgeons of Glasgow and Dean of Faculties at the University of Glasgow.

== Early life and career ==
Born in Hamilton, Lanarkshire, Scotland on 15 June 1916 and educated at the prestigious Hamilton Academy school from which he won a bursary to attend the University of Glasgow which he entered in 1934, McGirr graduated BSc in 1937 and MB ChB with honours in 1940.

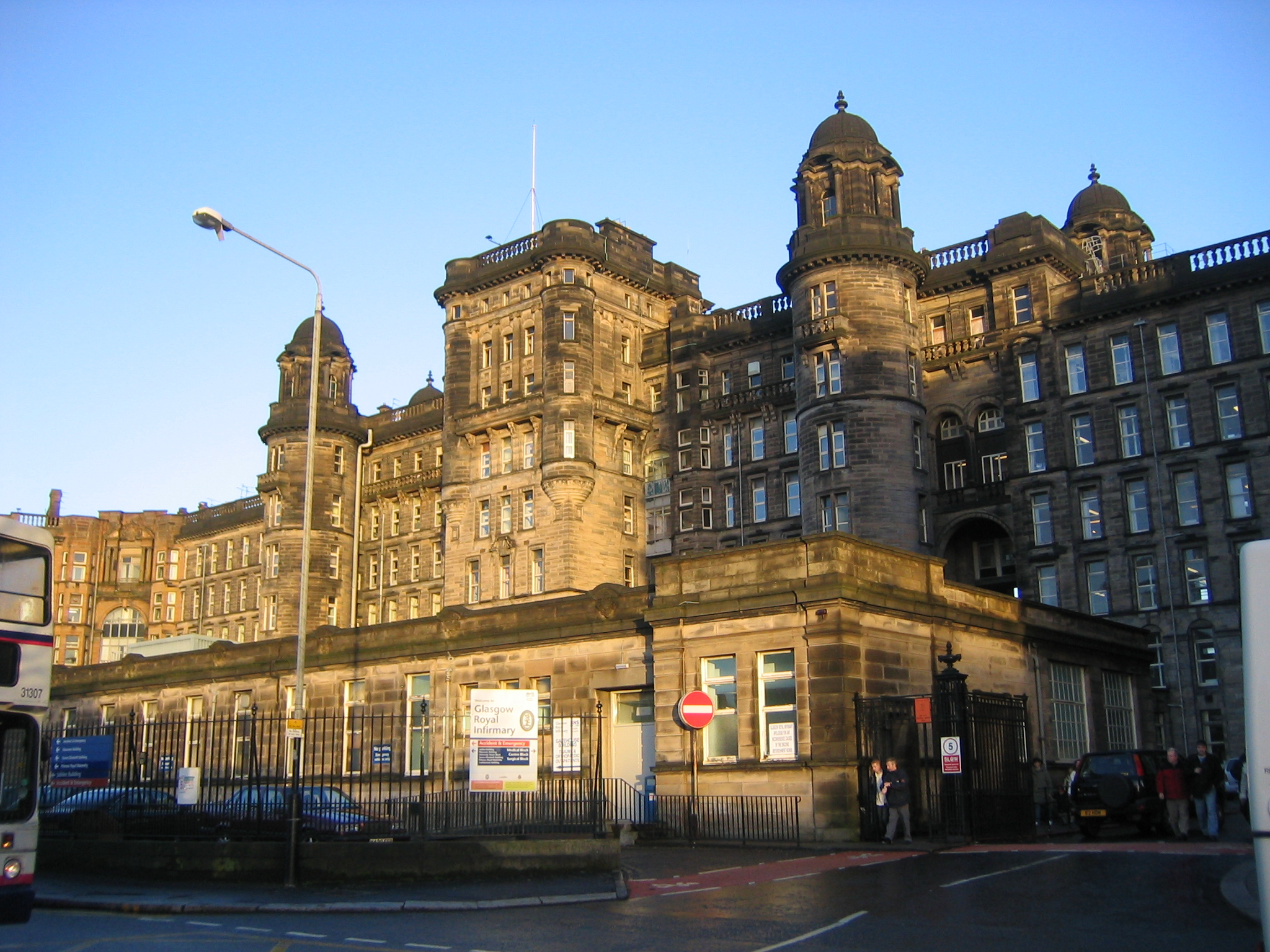
Glasgow Royal Infirmary

Following house posts in medicine at Glasgow Royal Infirmary and in surgery at Glasgow Western Infirmary McGirr entered the RAMC (Royal Army Medical Corps) (1941–46) largely serving overseas, in India, Burma, Siam and Indochina. Brigadier Max Rosenheim (Max Rosenheim, Baron Rosenheim) noted his potential which led to McGirr's promotion to specialist rank (honorary major.) Demobilised in 1947, McGirr returned to the Department of Medicine at Glasgow Royal Infirmary where he was highly instrumental in the change of the department from a teaching department to one involved in clinical research, this leading to the award of MD with honours and the Bellahouston Medal by Glasgow University.

== Mid career ==
In 1961 McGirr was appointed Muirhead Professor of Medicine at Glasgow Royal Infirmary and over the next fifteen years his department emerged as one of the best in the UK for clinical research. In 1963 he was elected a member of the Harveian Society of Edinburgh and served as President in 1979. In 1968 appointed vice-president of the Royal College of Physicians and Surgeons of Glasgow McGirr then served as president from 1970 to 1972. In 1974 Professor McGirr was appointed Dean of the Faculty of Medicine of the University of Glasgow, a post held until his retirement in 1981. Professor McGirr established the Nursing and Health Care School at the University of Glasgow in 1977, which offered a four year undergraduate pre-registration Bachelor of Nursing degree programme.

== Later career and retirement ==
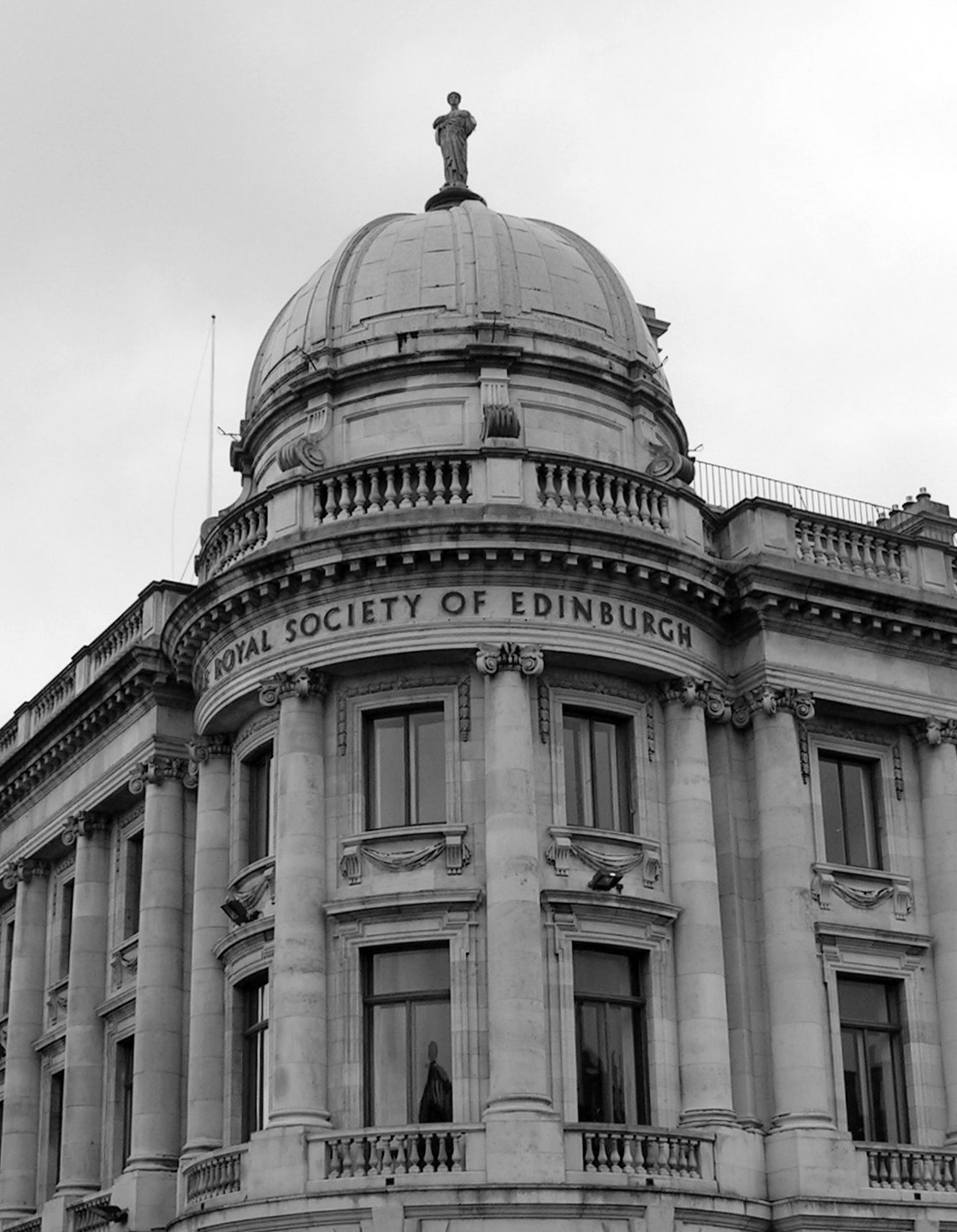
Royal Society of Edinburgh

McGirr was to serve on a wide range of advisory bodies, including the Scottish Council for Postgraduate Medical and Dental Education, the medical sub-committee of the Universities' Grants Committee, the medical committee of Vice Chancellors and Principals, the General Nursing Council for Scotland, the National Radiological Protection Board and the Intercollegiate Committee on Nuclear Medicine. Other appointments included honorary consultant physician to the army in Scotland, and membership of Greater Glasgow Health Board.

In recognition of his work, McGirr was appointed a CBE in 1978, an honorary DSc in 1995, and fellowships of the Royal Society of Edinburgh and the American College of Physicians. He was also appointed to the post of Dean of Faculties at Glasgow University (1992-94.)

In retirement Professor McGirr published an account of the life of the celebrated 18th. century physician William Cullen who almost 200 years before had, like himself, been educated at the Hamilton Academy school and Glasgow University.

Professor Dr. McGirr died on 12 May 2003.

Academic offices
Preceded by Leslie John Davis	Muirhead Chair of Medicine; 1961-1978	Succeeded by Arthur Colville Kennedy
