= David Carter (surgeon) =

Scottish surgeon (born 1940)

Sir David Craig Carter FRSE FRCS FRCPE (born 1 September 1940) is a surgeon who was Chief Medical Officer for Scotland from 1996 to 2000.

== Early life and education ==
David Craig Carter was born on 1 September 1940 to Mary Florence (née Lister) and Horace Ramsay Carter. He attended Cockermouth Grammar School, and went on to study medicine at the University of St Andrews, graduating with an MB ChB in 1964 and continuing on to receive his MD.

== Surgeon ==
He was St Mungo Professor of Surgery at the University of Glasgow from 1979 to 1988. He then became the Regius Professor of Clinical Surgery at the University of Edinburgh.

He was appointed the Chief Medical Officer for Scotland in 1996 and continued in this role until 2000, when he was succeeded by Mac Armstrong.

In 1984 Carter was elected a member of the Harveian Society of Edinburgh and served as president in 1998. In 1987 he was elected a member of the Aesculapian Club.

Carter was the Honorary President of the British Medical Association from 2001 to 2002, vice-president of the Royal Society of Edinburgh 2000–03.

== Honours and awards ==
He was awarded a Knight Bachelor for services to medicine in the 1996 New Year Honours.

In 2007, the Royal Society of Edinburgh honoured him by making him a Royal Medallist.

In 2010, he received an honorary DSc from the University of Hull.
