= Queen Victoria Hospital, Morecambe =

Queen Victoria Hospital
- University Hospitals of Morecambe Bay NHS Foundation Trust
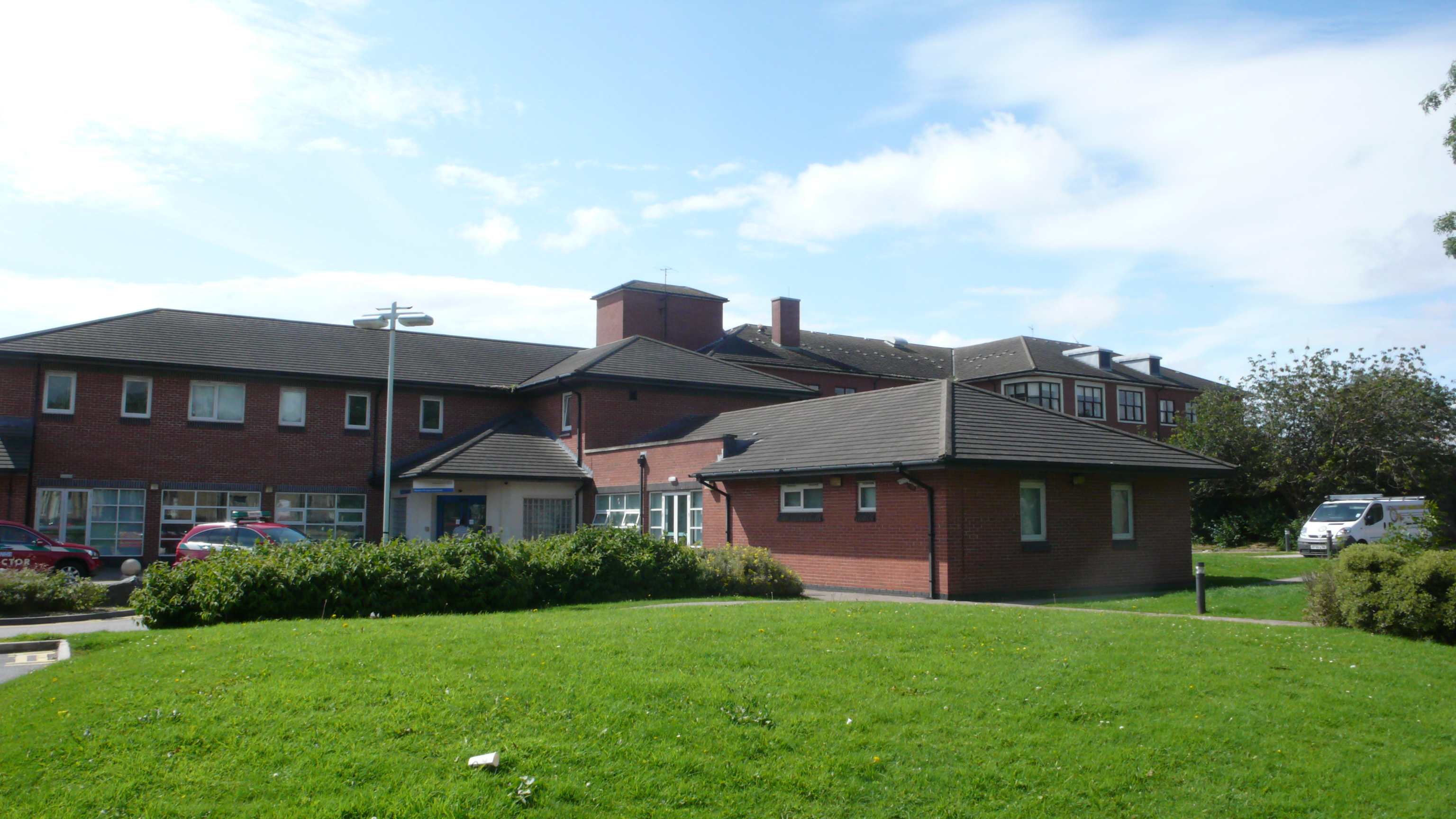
- Queen Victoria Hospital

- Shown in Lancashire

Geography
- Location: Thornton Road, Morecambe, England, United Kingdom
- Coordinates: 54.0728°N 2.8591°W

Organisation
- Care system: NHS
- Type: General

History
- Founded: 1902

Links
- Lists: Hospitals in England

The Queen Victoria Hospital is a health facility on Thornton Road in Thornton Road, Morecambe, Lancashire, England. It is managed by the University Hospitals of Morecambe Bay NHS Foundation Trust.

== History ==
The foundation stone for the facility was laid in August 1900. It was opened by Lord Lathom as the Morecambe Queen Victoria Cottage Hospital in September 1902. Additions included a small extension in 1912, a new female wing in 1923 and a mortuary in 1932 as well as a nurses' home in 1934. It joined the National Health Service in 1948. The main hospital was demolished in 2002 and replaced by a modern health centre which retained the Queen Victoria Hospital name.
