= Henry Yellowlees =

British physician

Sir Henry Yellowlees MRCS FRCS KCB FRCP FFCM
- Born: 16 April 1919; Edinburgh, Scotland
- Died: 22 March 2006 (aged 86); Harpenden, Hertfordshire, England
- Education: Stowe School, University College, Oxford
- Occupations: Medical Officer; Chief Medical Officer 1973-1983
- Employer(s): Middlesex Hospital; Ministry of Health
- Organization(s): Medical Research Council; General Medical Council; British Medical Association; British Nutrition Foundation

Sir Henry Yellowlees KCB (16 April 1919 – 22 March 2006) was a British physician who was Chief Medical Officer (CMO) of the United Kingdom from 1973 to 1984.

He was the son of Henry Yellowlees MD (1888–1971) and grandson of David Yellowlees (1835–1921) both of whom were eminent psychiatrists in Scotland.

He was educated at Stowe School and University College, Oxford. He served in the RAF as a pilot in the Second World War.

After a sequence of appointments to regional hospital boards he was seconded to the Ministry of Health in 1963, rising to become George Godber's deputy in 1967 and Chief Medical Officer in 1973.

He died on 22 March 2006, survived by his second wife, Mary, and three children he had with his first wife, Sally.
