= Jeanelle de Gruchy =

British public health official

Jeanelle de Gruchy OBE

Deputy Chief Medical Officer for England
- Incumbent
- Assumed office 3 September 2021 Serving with Professor Jonathan Van-Tam (2021–2022), Aidan Fowler (2020–present); Thomas Waite (Interim: 2021–2022; 2022–present)

Personal details
- Profession: Public health official

Jeanelle Louise de Gruchy OBE is a UK public health official. Dr de Gruchy has been serving as a Deputy Chief Medical Officer for England since 3 September 2021.

She previously served as Director of Public Health (DPH) for Tameside in Greater Manchester and President (2018–2021) of the UK Association of Directors of Public Health (ADPH). As president, she published principles for local management of the SARS 2 epidemic (local outbreak plans) covering public health leadership, whole system, resourcing and effectiveness. She attended SAGE for the 58th meeting on 21 September 2020 which recommended a new response including a short 'circuit breaker' lockdown and subsequent meetings from December.

Originally from South Africa, Dr de Gruchy was previously DPH in Haringey in London, serving as vice president of ADPH in that time, and deputy DPH in Nottingham. Early in her career she wrote about the ethical challenges of health systems under apartheid.
