= Nursing & Health Care School, University of Glasgow =

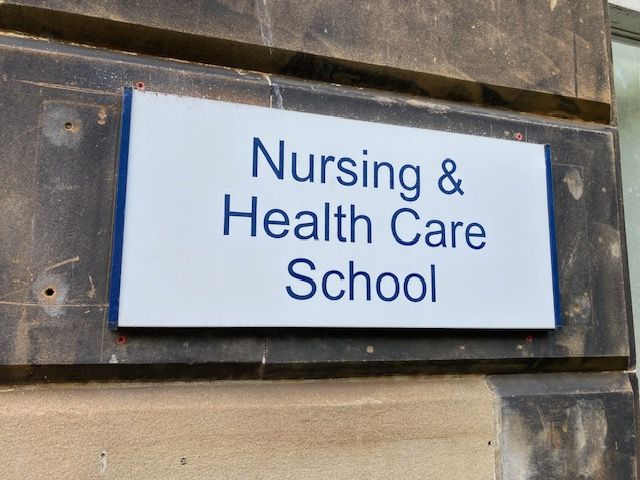
Sign on the building at 59 Oakfield Ave

The Nursing & Health Care School, University of Glasgow, (formerly the Division of Nursing and Health Care) is a speciality area within the School of Medicine, Dentistry and Nursing in Glasgow, Scotland. The School has offered a degree course in Nursing since 1978, introduced under the Dean of the Faculty of Medicine at the time, Professor Edward McGirr.

== History ==
University of Glasgow students contributed to nursing long before the Nursing & Health Care School opened. In 1915, it was announced that student volunteers could help at the Military Royal Army Medical Corps (RAMC). The Western and the Glasgow Royal Infirmary hospitals accepted volunteers as nurses though students could also volunteer at hospitals overseas. Many female students signed up and received training to work as nurses including both those who were undertaking medical training at Glasgow as well as those who were not pursuing a career in medicine. One such Glasgow alumna was Isabel MacPhail: when war broke in 1914, she and her sister Katherine went to Serbia to work in the Scottish Women's Hospital. MacPhail was awarded a number of decorations for her service: the French Medaille d’Honneur, the Serbian Cross of Charity and the Serbian Red Cross Nursing Medal.

The Nursing & Health Care School, originally known as the Department of Nursing Studies, was established by Professor Edward McGirr in 1978. He was Professor of Medicine from 1961 to 1978 and Dean of the Faculty of Medicine from 1974 to 1981. The School offered a four-year undergraduate pre-registration Bachelor of Nursing degree programme, which was to admit up to 25 students to the course which would lead to the award of the Bachelor of Nursing degree. The course would combine academic study and professional training. The choice of locating the Nursing degree programme within the Medical Faculty was deliberate with the intention to produce graduate nurses who would be thoroughly grounded in health-related scientific theory and be competent and safe practitioners.. Initially the Nursing and Health Care School was at 68 Oakfield Ave before moving to 57-61 Oakfield Ave as more space was required. A postgraduate diploma in emergency trauma care was offered in 1998.

In the first 30 years of the Nursing & Health Care School, 214 nurses had graduated from the programme. As of 2023, between 50 and 60 students start their Bachelor of Nursing (Hons) degree programme each year in Glasgow.

In 1986, eight students graduated from The Nursing & Healthcare School with a Master of Nursing degree, the first Nursing Masters in the UK.

In 2011, the University of Glasgow proposed closing the Nursing & Health Care School as part of a university-wide cost cutting exercise. A petition received over 900 signatories and the Royal College of Nursing spoke in favour of keeping the School open.

In 2016 the School of Nursing & Health Care and Singapore Institute of Technology developed a joint Bachelor of Science with Honours in Nursing. This two-year post-registration nursing degree programme was co-created and designed with inputs from practice partners and the Ministry of Health in Singapore, and accredited by the Singapore Nursing Board. This degree programme builds on the foundation that students have established during their nursing diploma studies. The aim of the programme is to develop critical, analytical and innovation skills, as well as leadership, research, teaching, and clinical competencies.

== Programmes ==
The Nursing & Health Care School runs both undergraduate and postgraduate programmes.

Undergraduate programmes

- Bachelor of Nursing (Honours) – four-year undergraduate programme
- Joint Singapore Institute of Technology (SIT) and University of Glasgow Bachelor of Science with Honours in Nursing

Postgraduate programmes

- Advanced Practice in Health Care MSc(MedSci)/PgDip/PgCert - with options to graduate with a specialised named award if appropriate credits are obtained. Named awards include Acute & critical care, Global health challenges, Health care chaplaincy, and Advanced lymphoedema management.
- Advanced Nursing Science MSc - with options to graduate with a specialised named award if appropriate credits are obtained. Named awards include Acute & critical care, and Global health challenges.
- Advanced Lymphoedema Management PgCert: Blended learning
- Healthcare Chaplaincy PgCert

CPD courses

- Burns & Plastic Surgery Care
- Specialist Lymphoedema Management

== Associated hospitals ==
- Queen Elizabeth University Hospital
- Glasgow Royal Infirmary
- Golden Jubilee University National Hospital

== Notable alumni, academics and staff ==
=== Professors of Nursing ===
- Professor Agnes Jarvis, Professor of Nursing Studies.
- Professor Lorraine N. Smith was appointed Professor of Nursing Studies in 1990. She remained as Professor Emerita after her retirement from 2012.
- Professor Bridget Johnston is Clinical Professor of Nursing and Palliative Care, Director of Research School of Medicine, Dentistry & Nursing, College of Medical, Veterinary & Life Sciences, University of Glasgow and Chief Nurse Research, NHS Greater Glasgow & Clyde. Professor Johnston was named as a Fellow of the Royal College of Nursing in May 2019 in recognition of her research work in palliative and end of life care.
- Professor Eileen Cowey - Professor of Nursing Studies and Head of School (2021 onwards).

=== Heads of School ===
- 1983 - 1988 Professor Agnes Jarvis
- 1989 - 1990 Professor Hamish Barber
- 1990 – 2001 Professor Lorraine N. Smith
- 2001 - 2003 Nora Kearney
- 2003 - 2007 Dr Joan McDowell
- 2007 - 2016 Margaret Sneddon
- 2016 - 2020 Professor Ann Marie Rice
- 2020 - 2021 Dr Doreen Molloy
- 2021 – present Professor Eileen Cowey

=== Other notable staff ===
- Olivia Brittian MCC RN RM ONC HV CPT, joined the University of Glasgow in 1987. She worked as the Director of Undergraduate Programme in the Nursing and Health Care School, Ms Brittian originally trained in the Victoria Infirmary in 1963 and worked as a Midwifery sister in Nigeria and as a Health Visitor in Glasgow.
- Honorary Professor Christine Moffatt CBE was a Visiting Chair at the University of Glasgow in 2008. She received the accolade of the Nursing Times Diamond 20 award, which recognises the 20 most influential nurses of the last 60 years, who have changed the face of the profession from the inception of the National Health Service, and made a significant contribution to health care. The award was in recognition of Christine's transformation of leg-ulcer management and her contribution to wound care and lymphoedema management.
- Rev. David Mitchell, the Programme Leader for Healthcare Chaplaincy in Nursing & Health Care wrote Spiritual Care for Healthcare‌ Professionals with colleagues Ewan Kelly, Programme Director Spiritual Care and Healthcare Chaplaincy NHS Education for Scotland; and Tom Gordon, Chair of the Chaplaincy Training Advisory Group, Scotland. This book won the British Medical Association Book Award, 2012.
- Robin Downie, Emeritus Professor of Moral Philosophy and an Honorary Professorial Research Fellow in the Department of Philosophy.
- Margaret Sneddon, Lymphoedema Care Nurse of the Year, 2014.

== Annual McGirr Public Lecture ==
A lecture is held annually to commemorate Professor McGirr and the establishment of Nursing at Glasgow. The McGirr Prize is awarded to the most distinguished graduate of the year in the Bachelor of Nursing Degree. The Annual McGirr Lecture was established in 2003. Guest speakers have included:

- 2007 – Olivia Giles, founder of 500 miles charity
- 2008 – Justine Whittaker, Nurse of the Year 2007
- 2009 – Jason Leitch, National Clinical Lead for Patient Safety and Improvement at the Scottish Government.
- 2010 – Lynn Murray, Co-founder ‘Think Pink Scotland' raising funds for breast cancer research
- 2011 – Ros Moore, Chief Nursing Officer, The Scottish Government
- 2012 - Mary Waddell, OBE, retired Director of Nursing, Eastern Board, Northern Ireland
- 2013 - Cathy van Beek - Patient Partnership; a Challenge 4 Change
- 2014 – Emma Cartwright, a young person with diabetes
- 2015 – Ona Croft, Shift Leader, Kerrytown Ebola Virus Disease Treatment Unit (EVDTU), Sierra Leone
- 2016 - Dr Christine Goodall, founder Medics against Violence charity in collaboration with the Scottish Violence Reduction Unit
- 2017 – Professor Brendan McCormack, internationally recognised for work in person-centred practice development and research
- 2018 – Fiona McQueen, Chief Nursing Officer, The Scottish Government
- 2019 – Sarah Everett – Men's Shed Govan and Patient's Choice Award Winner at RCNI Nurse Awards
- 2020 – did not take place due to pandemic
- 2021 – Professor Alex McMahon, Chief Nursing Officer, The Scottish Government
- 2022 - Professor Calvin Moorley, Professor Diversity & Social Justice
- 2023 - Professor Roma Maguire, MBE Professor of Digital Health and Care, University of Strathclyde
- 2024 - Dr Heather Baid, University of Brighton, 'Environmental sustainability in healthcare practice, education and research'
- 2025 - Alison Bunce CEO, founder, leader and guiding force of Compassionate Inverclyde
- 2026 - Dr Aisha Holloway, Chief Nursing Officer for Scotland

== University of Glasgow Nursing Society ==
The University of Glasgow has a Nursing Society run by nursing students. Students from the society took part in the 2025 Glasgow Science Festival to raise the profile of the pioneers of nursing in Glasgow.

== Awards and Scholarships ==
- Margaret Auld Prize - Margaret Auld was Chief Nursing Officer for Scotland from January 1977 to February 1988. In recognition of her contribution to nursing and midwifery education, including as part of the Briggs Committee on Nursing (1972–1976). The Margaret Auld Prize is awarded for the best dissertation in each graduating year of the Bachelor of Nursing with Honours degree.
- Mrs Ann Hart Buchanan Scholarship - The University of Glasgow is the recipient of a bequest from the estate of Mrs Ann Hart Buchanan for the purpose of nurse education and training. This scholarship is awarded annually for the purposes of travel in connection with study or research that will enhance the student's learning and learning experience (undergraduate or postgraduate); supporting tuition fees for a graduate with BN (Hons) [1st or 2:1] to undertake a postgraduate course of study in the Nursing & Health Care School at the University of Glasgow within 2 years of graduation; supporting undergraduate student(s) with a minimum of one-third of the funds in any three-year period.

== Student nurses during COVID-19 ==
Student nurses across Scotland had their education disrupted during COVID-19. In March 2020, student nurses and midwives in year 2 onwards could ‘opt in’ to a revised programme structure of extended paid placements to support the workforce during the COVID-19 pandemic. Students registered with the NHS Education for Scotland (NES) COVID-19 Accelerated Recruitment Portal. Allocations of placements remained the responsibility of universities in line with Nursing and Midwifery Council emergency standards to ensure they achieved programme outcomes. Final-year nursing students in Scotland were offered band 4 pay if they signed up to help with the COVID-19 pandemic.

== Ranking ==
The Nursing and Healthcare School is ranked 1st in the 2027 Nursing & Midwifery League Table of the Complete University Guide for the UK. The Nursing and Healthcare School is ranked 1st in the UK for Nursing in The Times/Sunday Times rankings for 2027.
