= Westmorland General Hospital =

- University Hospitals of Morecambe Bay NHS Foundation Trust
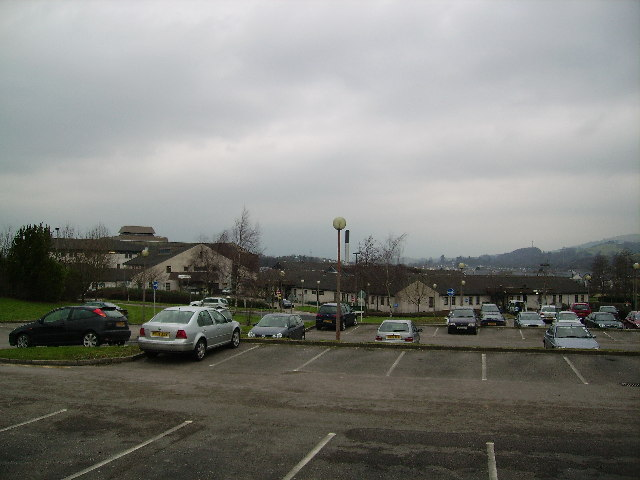
- Westmorland General Hospital

- Shown in Cumbria

Geography
- Location: Kendal, Cumbria, England
- Coordinates: 54.3064°N 2.7323°W

Organisation
- Care system: NHS
- Type: District general

Services
- Emergency department: No
- Beds: 33

Links
- Website: www.uhmb.nhs.uk/hospitals/westmorland-general-hospital/
- Lists: Hospitals in England

Westmorland General Hospital (WGH) is a hospital in Kendal, Cumbria, England. It is managed by the University Hospitals of Morecambe Bay NHS Foundation Trust.

== History ==
The hospital has its origins in the Kendal Memorial Hospital founded in 1869. This became the Westmorland County Hospital in 1906.

It was decided to construct modern facilities in the early 1990s and a new hospital was opened by the Princess Royal on 6 July 1992. An upgraded cardiac centre designed to treat over 1,000 patients each year was opened in August 2017. A scheme to create a new resuscitation area and an upgrade of the macular unit was initiated in July 2018.

== Services ==
An inspection by the Care Quality Commission in October 2016 assessed the performance of the hospital as "good". Hospital Radio is provided by Bay Trust Radio.

== See also ==
- Healthcare in Cumbria
- List of hospitals in England
