= Dialysis disequilibrium syndrome =

Complication of dialysis

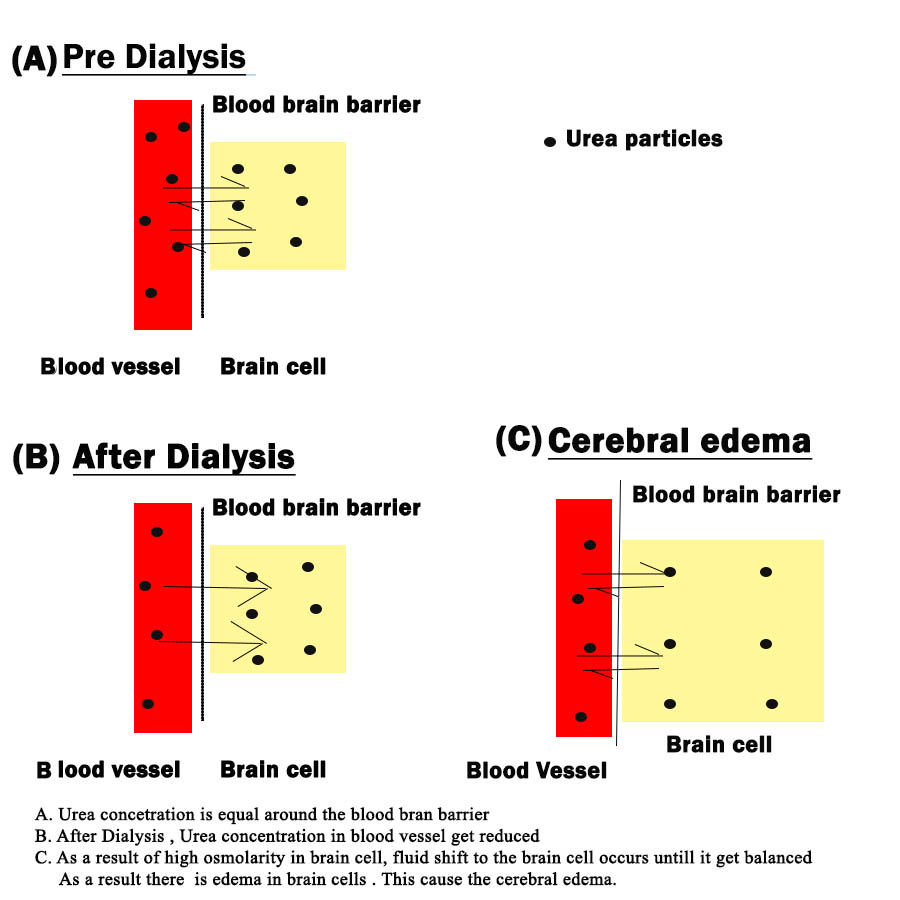
- Specialty: Neurology, nephrology

Dialysis disequilibrium syndrome (DDS) is the collection of neurological signs and symptoms, attributed to cerebral edema, during or following shortly after intermittent hemodialysis or CRRT.

Classically, DDS arises in individuals starting hemodialysis due to end-stage chronic kidney disease and is associated, in particular, with "aggressive" (high solute removal) dialysis. However, it may also arise in fast onset, i.e. acute kidney failure in certain conditions.

== Symptoms and signs ==
Diagnosis of mild DDS is often complicated by other dialysis complications such as malignant hypertension, uremia, encephalopathy, subdural hemorrhage, hyper- and hypoglycaemia, or electrolyte imbalances. Presentation of moderate and severe DDS requires immediate identification and treatment as the condition can result in severe neurological issues and death.

- Headache
- Nausea
- Dizziness
- Confusion
- Visual disturbance
- Tremor
- Seizures
- Coma

== Causes ==
The cause of DDS is currently not well understood. There are two theories to explain it; the first theory postulates that urea transport from the brain cells is slowed in chronic kidney disease, leading to a large urea concentration gradient, which results in reverse osmosis. The second theory postulates that organic compounds are increased in uremia to protect the brain and result in injury by, like in the first theory, reverse osmosis. More recent studies on rats noted that brain concentrations of organic osmolytes were not increased relative to baseline after rapid dialysis. Cerebral edema was thus attributed to osmotic effects related to a high urea gradient between plasma and brain.

== Diagnosis ==
Clinical signs of cerebral edema, such as focal neurological deficits, papilledema and decreased level of consciousness, if temporally associated with recent hemodialysis, suggest the diagnosis. A computed tomography of the head is typically done to rule-out other intracranial causes.

MRI of the head has been used in research to better understand DDS.

== Treatment ==
Avoidance is the primary treatment. Better alternatives are Nocturnal or Daily Dialysis, which are far more gentle processes for the new dialysis patient. Dialysis disequilibrium syndrome is a reason why hemodialysis initiation should be done gradually, i.e. it is a reason why the first few dialysis sessions are shorter and less aggressive than the typical dialysis treatment for end-stage renal disease patients.

== See also ==
- Kidney failure
