= Furness General Hospital =

- University Hospitals of Morecambe Bay NHS Foundation Trust
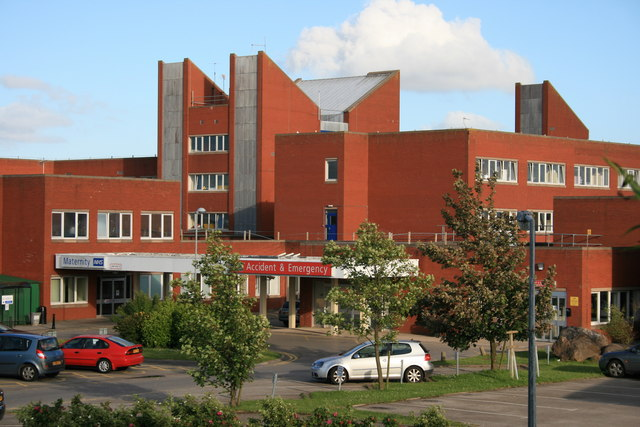
- The Accident and Emergency entrance at FGH

- Shown in Cumbria

Geography
- Location: Barrow-in-Furness, Cumbria, North West England, United Kingdom
- Coordinates: 54.1364°N 3.2079°W

Organisation
- Care system: Public NHS
- Type: Teaching
- Affiliated university: Lancaster Medical School

Services
- Emergency department: Yes Accident & Emergency

History
- Founded: 1984

Links
- Website: www.uhmb.nhs.uk/hospitals/furness-general-hospital/
- Lists: Hospitals in the United Kingdom

Furness General Hospital (FGH) is a hospital located in the Hawcoat area of Barrow-in-Furness, Cumbria, England. It is managed by the University Hospitals of Morecambe Bay NHS Foundation Trust.

== History ==
The hospital, which replaced four local hospitals (Devonshire Road Hospital, North Lonsdale Hospital, Risedale Maternity Hospital and Roose Hospital), was opened to patients on 14 October 1984. It was officially opened by Queen Elizabeth II in May 1985. Margaret Thatcher, Prime Minister, visited the hospital in September 1986.

In May 2001 a DNA test was conducted in the hospital on a body recovered from the infamous Bluebird K7 crash which demonstrated that it was indeed that of Donald Campbell.

One of the world's worst legionnaires' disease outbreaks occurred in Barrow in October 2002. Ultimately 7 people died as a result of contracting the disease, while a further 172 cases were confirmed at the hospital.

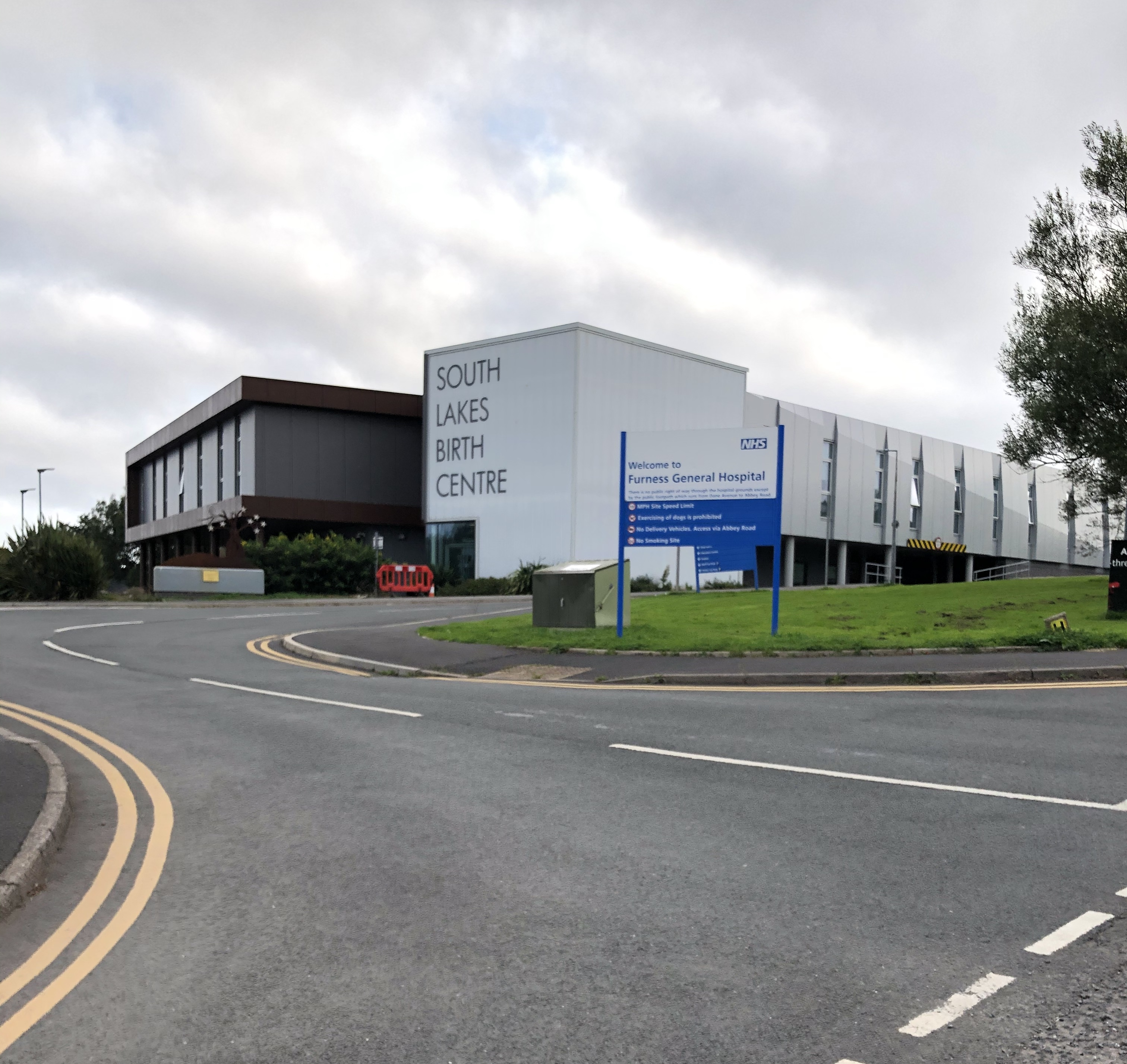
The South Lakes Birth Centre opened in 2018

The Furness General Hospital scandal involved an investigation by Cumbria Constabulary and other government and public bodies into the deaths of several mothers and newborn babies at the hospital. Cases dated back to 2004, with a number of major incidents occurring in 2008. The death of Joshua Titcombe and a suppressed report by the Morecambe Bay NHS Trust brought the spotlight onto the hospital in 2011 when investigations began. Claims of medical records being intentionally destroyed alongside the discovery of major wrongdoing on behalf of midwives led to threats of closure to the maternity ward.

A number of injured passengers involved in the February 2007 Grayrigg train derailment were brought to the hospital.

The body of Derrick Bird who killed 12 people in the 2010 Cumbria shootings was formally identified at the hospital. However, unlike West Cumberland Hospital and the Cumberland Infirmary, FGH was not on high alert during the shooting spree itself.

Wards were closed in April 2013, April 2015, October 2015, and October 2019 after outbreaks of norovirus.

The new South Lakes Birth Centre, built at a cost of £12 million, was opened at the hospital on 14 February 2018.

The hospital and attached nursery were put on lockdown on 2 November 2018 after an armed man was spotted nearby the grounds with an air weapon.

== Services ==
An average of between 1,200 and 1,300 babies are delivered in FGH every year, this is one of the lowest figures of any general hospital in North West England. In terms or waiting times at FGH, 93% of patients are treated within an 18-week period. The MRSA blood infection rate at the hospital is extremely low with only 0.8 infections for every 10,000 bed days. (which is on par with national average). Overall the hospital has been rated 'fair' although the food provided has been rated 'excellent' and the quality of the hospital environment, 'good' (81% of people who have rated FGH on the NHS official website would recommend to a friend).

The majority of people rescued from accidents in the Lake District Mountains come to the hospital.

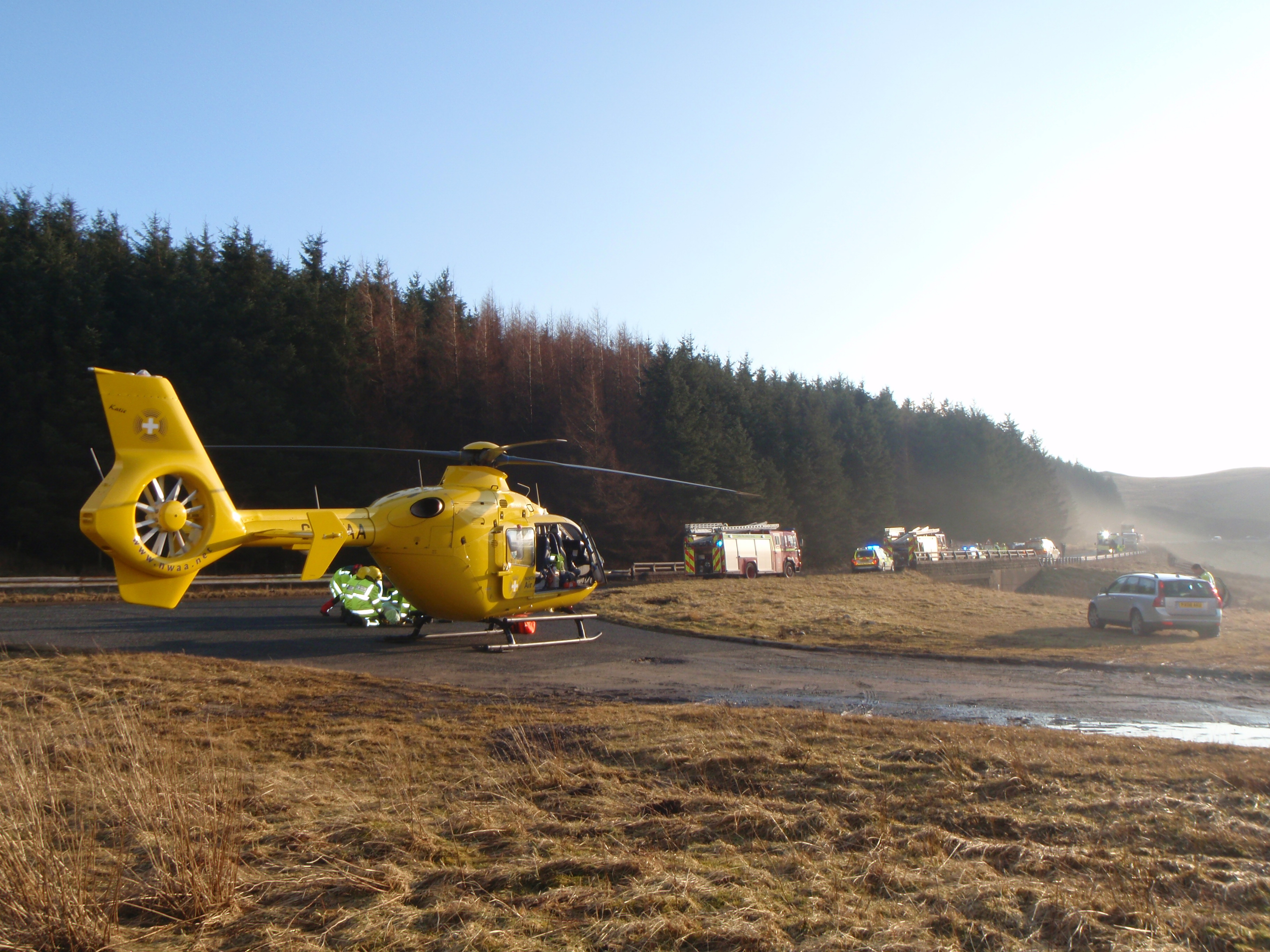
A North West Air Ambulance helicopter attending an incident in Shap, Eden before heading to FGH with the patient

== Performance ==
An inspection by the Care Quality Commission (CQC) published in February 2017 gave the hospital a 'good' overall rating with caring graded as 'outstanding' but with patient safety 'requiring improvement'. The CQC inspected the service again in 2019 and the hospital's overall rating was unchanged. Most recently, the CQC inspected the service in 2021 and the overall rating had fallen to 'requires improvement'. Specific services indicated that End of Life Care was 'outstanding', Urgent and Emergency Services 'requires improvement' and Maternity was 'inadequate', while all other service areas were 'good'.

== See also ==
- Healthcare in Cumbria
- List of hospitals in England
- Barrow-in-Furness
- General Hospital
- National Health Service
