= Royal Lancaster Infirmary =

Lancaster Royal Infirmary
- University Hospitals of Morecambe Bay NHS Foundation Trust
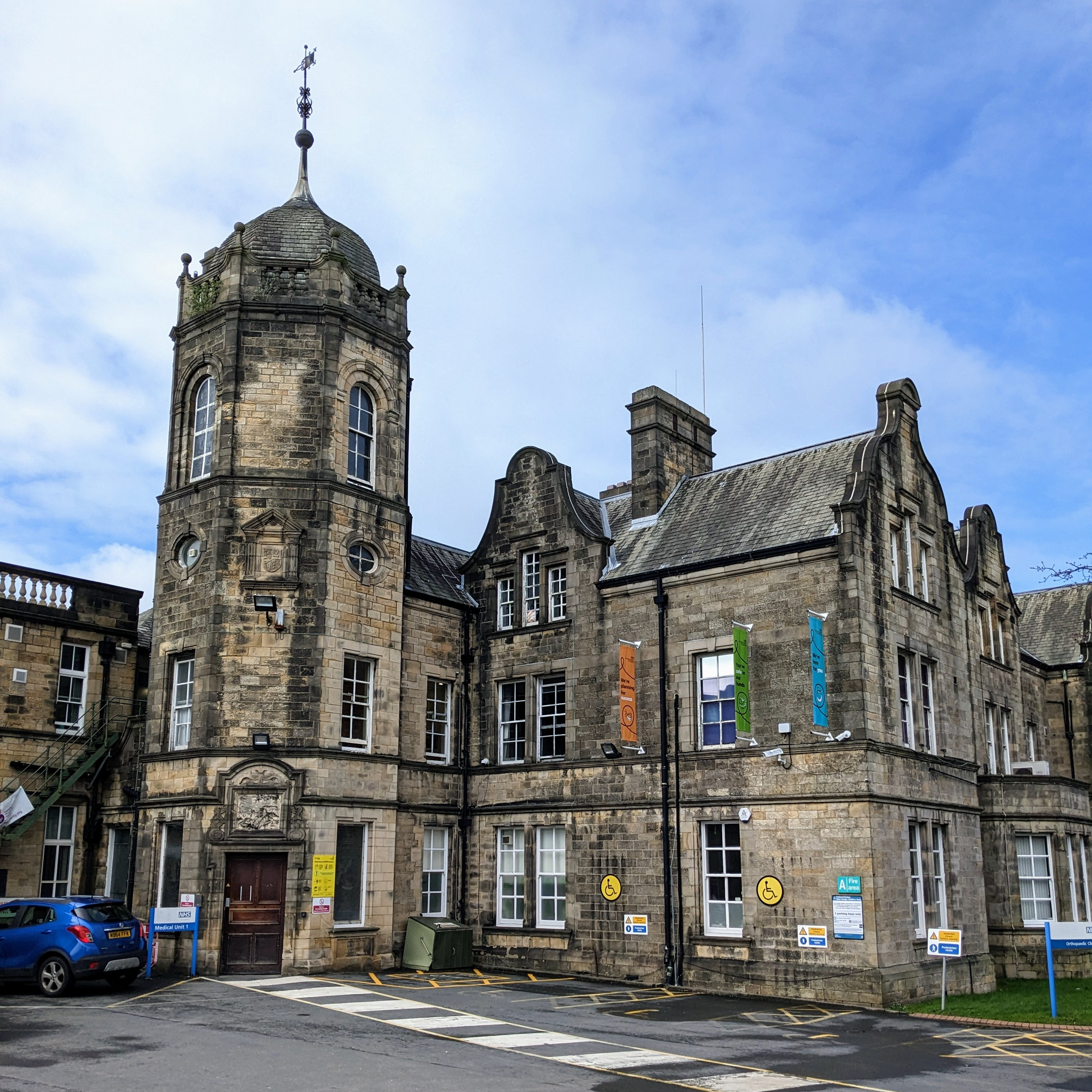
- Original building of Royal Lancaster Infirmary

- Shown in Lancashire

Geography
- Location: Lancaster, Lancashire, North West England, United Kingdom
- Coordinates: 54.0425°N 2.8003°W

Organisation
- Care system: Public NHS
- Type: Teaching

Services
- Emergency department: Yes Accident & Emergency
- Beds: 387

History
- Founded: 1781

Links
- Website: uhmb.nhs.uk/hospitals/royal-lancaster-infirmary/
- Lists: Hospitals in the United Kingdom

The Royal Lancaster Infirmary (RLI) is a hospital in the city of Lancaster, England. It lies to the south of the city centre, between the A6 road and the Lancaster Canal. It is managed by the University Hospitals of Morecambe Bay NHS Foundation Trust.

== History ==
The infirmary has its origins in a dispensary which opened on Castle Hill in 1781 and a fever hospital established in 1815. These two institutions combined in premises in Thurnham Street in 1833.

A larger site on Ashton Road, which had previously been known as the Springfield Estate, was bought for £2,471 in 1888 and, following a donation of nearly £10,000 by James Williamson, a local businessman, the first building of the new hospital, designed by architects Paley and Austin, was opened by the Duke and Duchess of York in 1896. The original building is now Grade II listed. Springfield Hall was retained and used as an overnight nurses' home for the hospital.

A new maternity unit opened in 1979, the pathology building was added in 1994 and the new centenary building opened in 1996.

The Huggett Suite, a unit for treating stroke patients built at a cost of £1 million, opened in spring 2017 and a new therapies outpatient department, built at a cost of £1.2 million, opened in 2018.

== Notable staff ==
- Dame Sheila Quinn, DBE, FRCN, RGN, RM, RNT trained as a nurse at the infirmary between 1943 and 1946. Quinn was president of the Royal College of Nursing (RCN) from 1982 to 1986.

== Performance ==
An inspection by the Care Quality Commission (CQC) published in February 2017 gave the hospital a good overall rating with caring graded as outstanding but with patient safety requiring improvement.

== Public transport ==
The hospital is served by buses from the city centre and surrounding areas, including a park and ride service from a car park adjacent to junction 34 of the M6 motorway. It is about 0.7 miles (1.1 km) from Lancaster railway station on foot, but further when driving.

== See also ==
- Listed buildings in Lancaster, Lancashire
- List of hospitals in England
