= Furness General Hospital scandal =

2000s-2010s medical scandal in the United Kingdom

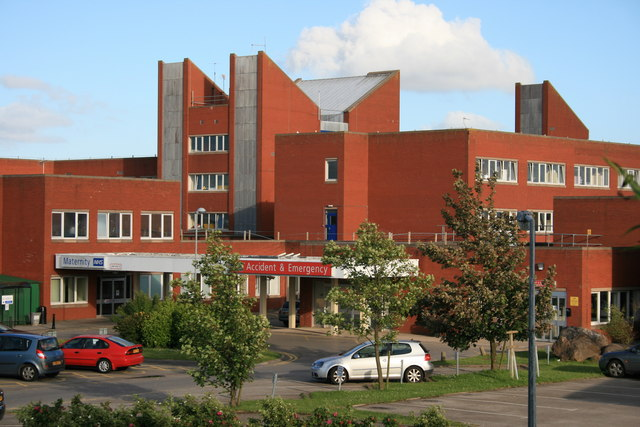
Entrance to the maternity ward at Furness General Hospital

The Furness General Hospital scandal involves an investigation by Cumbria Constabulary and other government and public bodies into the deaths of several mothers and newborn babies, during the 2000s at Furness General Hospital (FGH) in Barrow-in-Furness, Cumbria, England. Cases date back to 2004, with a number of major incidents occurring in 2008. The death of Joshua Titcombe and a suppressed report by the Morecambe Bay NHS Trust brought the spotlight onto FGH in 2011 when investigations began. Claims of medical records being intentionally destroyed alongside the discovery of major wrongdoing on behalf of midwives led to threats of closure to the maternity ward.

The scandal was covered in a 2012 BBC Panorama episode titled "How Safe is Your Hospital?" with the Stafford Hospital scandal. In June 2013, Cumbria Constabulary announced they would only be pursuing the Titcombe case and that other complaints would not proceed to a criminal prosecution. Later in the same month, the British medical community was rocked by allegations that the Care Quality Commission (CQC), which took part in investigations, was fully aware of concerns of maternity care at FGH as early as 2008 and gave the hospital a clean bill of health in 2010, having destroyed evidence to the contrary.

The independently issued Morecambe Bay Investigation Report was published in 2015, stating a "lethal mix" of "serious and shocking" failings had led to the deaths of eleven babies and one mother. The report recommended a national review of maternity care and thorough investigations of staff members involved by the General Medical Council and Nursing and Midwifery Council. Numerous investigations have discovered serious failings, corruption and cover-ups on every level; investigations continue and no individual has been held accountable for the deaths at FGH. The criminal investigation into the scandal was concluded in April 2015 with no prosecutions.

== Notable cases ==
Police did not announce the number of deaths being investigated, but a number were known to be under investigation. Several families of the victims have revealed that they are suing the University Hospitals of Morecambe Bay NHS Trust, claiming clinical negligence. The claim of Carl Hendrickson (husband and father of Nittaya and Chester Hendrickson respectively) alone was expected to exceed £50,000.

An inquest into the death of nine-day-old Joshua Titcombe at FGH revealed the infection that killed him could easily have been treated if noticed by midwives. Medical staff ignored his parents Hoa and James's fears for his health.

== CQC investigations ==
On 13 September, several national newspapers reported that the race of the children involved played a role in the hospital's wrongdoings after it was revealed 83 percent of serious incidents at FGH in 2008 involved ethnic minorities, while only 2 percent of Barrow's population was non-white. In September 2011, a spokeswoman for Cumbria Constabulary stated that it was "too early to say" whether race had played a part in the rate of incidents, but that the investigation had not ruled it out as a factor.

Other bodies involved in the investigation include health watchdog, the Care Quality Commission and the Nursing and Midwifery Council. A report by the CQC threatened to close the maternity ward at FGH by 21 November 2011 if major changes were not implemented. The NMC identified 19 areas requiring urgent improvement, including governance, risk management, collaborative working and leadership.

In late October 2011, during the height of the investigation, leaked figures revealed that FGH had the worst mortality rate of any hospital in England. The mortality ratio for the University Hospitals of Morecambe Bay NHS Trust (which also runs hospitals in Lancaster and Kendal) stood at 124, significantly higher than national average. It is suspected that up to 16 babies and two mothers died at FGH due to poor care with over 30 claims for compensation; despite this Cumbria police narrowed their investigation in 2013 to focus on the death of just one child and decided not to prosecute over any of the other deaths.

=== Care Quality Commission controversy ===
In August 2012, new CQC chief executive David Behan commissioned a report by management consultants Grant Thornton. The report examining the CQCs response to complaints about baby and maternal deaths and injuries at Furness General Hospital, was instigated by a complaint from a member of the public and "an allegation of a 'cover-up', submitted by a whistleblower at CQC." It was published on 19 June 2013.

Among the findings, the CQC was "accused of quashing an internal review that uncovered weaknesses in its processes" and had allegedly "deleted the review of their failure to act on concerns about University Hospitals of Morecambe Bay NHS Trust". One CQC employee claimed that he was instructed by a senior manager "to destroy his review because it would expose the regulator to public criticism". The report concluded "We think that the information contained in the [deleted] report was sufficiently important that the deliberate failure to provide it could properly be characterised as a 'cover-up'".

In June 2013, following a series of critical reports and facing 30 civil claims for negligence, it was announced that the organisation would be subjected to a public inquiry. David Prior, who was appointed CQC Chair in February 2013, admitted that the organisation was "not fit for purpose". Jeremy Hunt, the Secretary of State for Health, issued an official apology in the House of Commons for "the appalling suffering" of the 30 families involved.

On 20 June 2013, Behan and Prior agreed to release the names of redacted senior managers within the Grant Thornton report, who were alleged had suppressed the internal CQC report. The people named were the former CQC Chief Executive Cynthia Bower, deputy CEO Jill Finney and media manager Anna Jefferson, who were all said by Grant Thornton to be present at a meeting where deletion of a critical report was allegedly discussed. Bower and Jefferson immediately denied being involved in a cover-up. In a later interview with The Independent, Bower accused the CQC of commissioning "a report... that was neither fair nor reasonable and "against natural justice", but admitted that the CQC inspection process, whilst she was CEO, had failed to uncover the failings at Morecambe Bay trust. She said: "We should have registered it with conditions." Finney brought an action for libel against the commission, denying that she had been part of a cover-up. The commission agreed in an out-of-court settlement to pay her £60,000 in damages and £510,000 towards her legal fees.

== Morecambe Bay Investigation ==
The Morecambe Bay Investigation Report was the independent public inquiry conducted by Bill Kirkup on behalf of the government into maternity and neonatal services and care at FGH, between 2004 and 2013. It was published in March 2015 with a damning verdict. The report stated the deaths of eleven babies and one mother at FGH were avoidable and a result of a "lethal mix" of failings. Amongst the findings were that the maternity unit had been "dysfunctional", with "substandard care" provided by staff "deficient in skills and knowledge". Working relationships between doctors and midwives had been extremely poor, there had been "significant organisational failure" on behalf of the Care Quality Commission and the North West Health Authority and Parliamentary and the Health Services Ombudsman had failed to take opportunities that could have brought the problems to light sooner. The report also stated that the Department of Health had been reliant on misleadingly optimistic assessments from regulators; 44 recommendations were made in the report, ranging from action to be taken on midwives involved, to national reviews on maternity care.

The Nursing and Midwifery Council was criticised by Kirkup, for the way it handled the investigation resulting from events at University Hospitals of Morecambe Bay NHS Foundation Trust, relating to misconduct by two midwives involved in the Furness General Hospital scandal. He said their response to his report had "fallen far short of expectations". The Professional Standards Authority said the regulator's investigation was "deficient" because evidence was not presented to the panel by the council even though it had it in its possession.

== Improvements ==
In November 2011, the University Hospitals of Morecambe Bay NHS Trust announced plans to replace outdated equipment and rebuild FGH's maternity ward at a cost of £5 million. A random inspection in September 2012 by the CQC found that recommended changes had been made and found quality and safety standards being met.
