= Chief Medical Officers (United Kingdom) =

Senior UK government health advisers

In the United Kingdom, a chief medical officer (CMO) is the most senior government adviser on matters relating to health. There are four chief medical officers in the United Kingdom who are appointed to advise their respective governments:

- His Majesty's Government (CMO for England and medical adviser to the United Kingdom government)
- Scottish Government
- Welsh Government
- Northern Ireland Executive

Each CMO is assisted by one or more deputy chief medical officers, and complemented by a chief nursing officer.

The chief medical officer is a qualified medical doctor whose medical speciality traditionally was public health medicine, and whose work focused on the health of communities rather than health of individuals. More recently, some appointees have been senior clinicians without training in public health medicine. In the UK, the CMO is one of the chief professional officers who advise the government in their respective health and social care disciplines. The CMO has independent statutory authority, first established in the 19th century, to issue reports without requiring government approval.

== Chief Medical Officers for England ==
The historic post was created in Victorian times to help to prevent cholera and other epidemics. In 1969, the post of Chief Medical Officer for Wales was created, and prior to this both England and Wales were covered by the post of Chief Medical Officer of England and Wales.

- Sir John Simon (1855–1876)
- Edward Cator Seaton (1876–1879)
- Sir George Buchanan (1879–1892)
- Sir Richard Thorne Thorne (1892–1899)
- Sir William Henry Power (1900–1908)
- Sir Arthur Newsholme (1908–1919)
- Sir George Newman (1919–1935)
- Sir Arthur MacNalty (1935–1940)
- Sir Wilson Jameson (1940–1950)
- Sir John Charles (1950–1960)
- Sir George Godber (1960–1973)
- Sir Henry Yellowlees (1973–1984)
- Sir Donald Acheson (1984–1991)
- Sir Kenneth Calman (1991–1998)
- Sir Liam Donaldson (1998 – May 2010)
- Dame Sally Davies (June 2010 – September 2019)
- Sir Chris Whitty (October 2019 – present)

=== Deputies ===
- George Godber (1950 to 1960)
- Albertine Winner (to 1967)
- Henry Yellowlees (1967 to 1973)
- John Reid (1972 to 1977)
- Liz Shore (1977 to 1985)
- E L Harris (1977 to 1989)
- Ronald Oliver (1985 to 1989)
- Michael Abrams (1985 to 1992)
- Diana Walford (1989 to 1992)
- Jeremy Metters (1989 to 1999)
- Graham Winyard (1993 to 1999)
- Patricia Troop (1999 to 2003)
- Sheila Adam (1999 to 2002)
- Aidan Halligan (2003 to 2007)
- Fiona Adshead (2004 to 2009)
- David Walker (2013 to 2015)
- John Watson (2013 to 2017)
- Gina Radford (2015 to 2019)
- Dame Jenny Harries (July 2019 – March 2021)
- Sir Jonathan Van-Tam (October 2017 – March 2022)
- Aidan Fowler (March 2020 – present)
- Thomas Waite interim (May 2021 – April 2022)
- Jeanelle de Gruchy (September 2021 – present)
- Thomas Waite (April 2022 – present)

== Chief Medical Officers for Scotland ==
Through various reorganisations, the CMOs for Scotland has been the chief medical officer in the Local Government Board for Scotland, medical member of the Scottish Board of Health, Department of Health for Scotland, the Scottish Home and Health Department, the Scottish Executive Health Department and now the Scottish Government:

- J. B. McLintock (1894–1898)
- James Burn Russell (1898–1904)
- Sir W. Leslie Mackenzie (1904–1929)
- J. P. Kinloch (1929–1932)
- J. L. Brownlie (1932–1937)
- J. M. Mackintosh (1937–1941)
- Sir Andrew Davidson (1941–1954)
- Sir Kenneth Cowan (1954–1964)
- Sir John Brotherston (1964–1977)
- Sir John Reid (1977–1985)
- Iain Macdonald (1985–1989)
- Sir Kenneth Calman (1989–1991)
- Robert Kendell (1991–1996)
- Sir David Carter (1996–2000)
- Ernest Macalpine ("Mac") Armstrong (2000–2005)
- Sir Harry Burns (2005–2014)
- Aileen Keel (2014–2015; acting)
- Catherine Calderwood (2015–2020)
- Sir Gregor Smith (2020 – present; acting until 23 December 2020)

== Chief Medical Officers for Wales ==
The Welsh post was created in 1969. Prior to this there was one post for both England and Wales, the Chief Medical Officer for England and Wales.

- Richard Bevan (1969–1977)
- Gareth Crompton (1978–1989)
- Dame Deirdre Hine (1990–1997)
- Ruth Hall (1997–2005)
- David Salter (July 2005 – April 2006; acting)
- Tony Jewell (April 2006 – 2012)
- Ruth Hussey (2012–2016)
- Chris Jones (March–July 2016; acting)
- Sir Frank Atherton (2016–2025)
- Professor Isabel Oliver (2025 – present)

== Chief Medical Officers for Northern Ireland ==
- William Richard Dawson (1922–1929) Chief Medical Officer of Ministry of Home Affairs, Northern Ireland
- Frank F. Main (1954–1968)
- Thomas Terence Baird (1973–1978)
- Bob Weir (1978–1986)
- James McKenna (1988–1995)
- Henrietta Campbell (1995–2006)
- Sir Michael McBride (2006 – present)

== See also ==
- Medical officer of health
- Chief Dental Officers (United Kingdom)
- Chief Nursing Officer (United Kingdom)
- Government Chief Scientific Adviser (United Kingdom)
