= Mary Sheila Christian =

British accident and emergency medic (1924–1997)

- Born: 16 September 1924
- Died: 24 July 1997 (aged 72)
- Education: University of Glasgow
- Occupations: Emergency physician; general surgeon

Mary Sheila Christian (16 September 1924 – 24 July 1997) was a British emergency physician and general surgeon. She is considered one of the founders of accident and emergency medicine in the United Kingdom.

== Biography ==
Mary Sheila Christian was born 16 September 1924. She studied medicine at the University of Glasgow, graduating in 1949.

She briefly worked as a general practitioner in Lanarkshire before undertaking training in general surgery. She spent three years working as a surgeon in Bahrain before returning to the UK, settling in Wexham, where she became a surgical registrar at Wexham Park Hospital. In 1969, she became the surgeon in charge of the hospital's accident & emergency (A&E) department. She moved to the Royal Free Hospital as an A&E consultant in 1973, but returned to Wexham Park in 1975 in an equivalent position.

Christian was responsible for rebuilding the A&E department at Wexham Park Hospital, as well as other departments in the county of Berkshire at Windsor, Maidenhead and Ascot. She developed one of Britain's first training courses for paramedics, and established an annual conference at Windsor for trainees in A&E medicine. She campaigned for basic life support skills to be taught to schoolchildren, and for stronger legislation around seat belts and drink-driving.

After the death of her husband, Christian moved to Canada, where she spent her final years. She died 24 July 1997.
