= University Hospitals of Morecambe Bay NHS Foundation Trust =

NHS hospital trust

- Type: NHS hospital trust
- Headquarters: Westmorland General Hospital, Kendal, North West England
- Chair: Aaron Cummins
- Staff: 5,759
- Website: University Hospitals of Morecambe Bay

University Hospitals of Morecambe Bay NHS Foundation Trust (UHMB or UHMBT) is an NHS Foundation Trust in North West England, providing services in South Cumbria and North Lancashire in the Morecambe Bay area. It has about 6,000 employees and provides services for some 350,000 people.

== Services ==
It provides services at:

- Royal Lancaster Infirmary in Lancaster
- Furness General Hospital in Barrow-in-Furness
- Westmorland General Hospital in Kendal, where the trust is headquartered.
- Queen Victoria Hospital in Morecambe
- Ulverston Community Health Centre (outpatients).

The Trust was the first to deploy Lorenzo patient record systems in the NHS. It implemented electronic patient record system Lorenzo Release 1.9 in June 2010.

In 2013, the Care Quality Commission stated that there had been problems with the Commission's oversight of the trust in 2010, that the Commission had "provided false assurances to the public" and that "[it] should not have registered UHMB without conditions", on publication of a report by Grant Thornton.

Jackie Daniel, chief executive said in June 2016 that she hoped to make her hospital "as small as humanly possible" as part of its new care model plans. Emergency and maternity services are to continue in Barrow and Lancaster, but about 65 weekly outpatient clinics will be replaced by community provisions and beds will be reduced. A new chief executive, Aaron Cummins, was appointed on 1 April 2018, as was Ian Johnson as the new Trust Chair.

The trust joined the Waterloo House GP practice in Millom in October 2016 to run the business side of the practice as part of the Better Together vanguard project.

== Performance ==
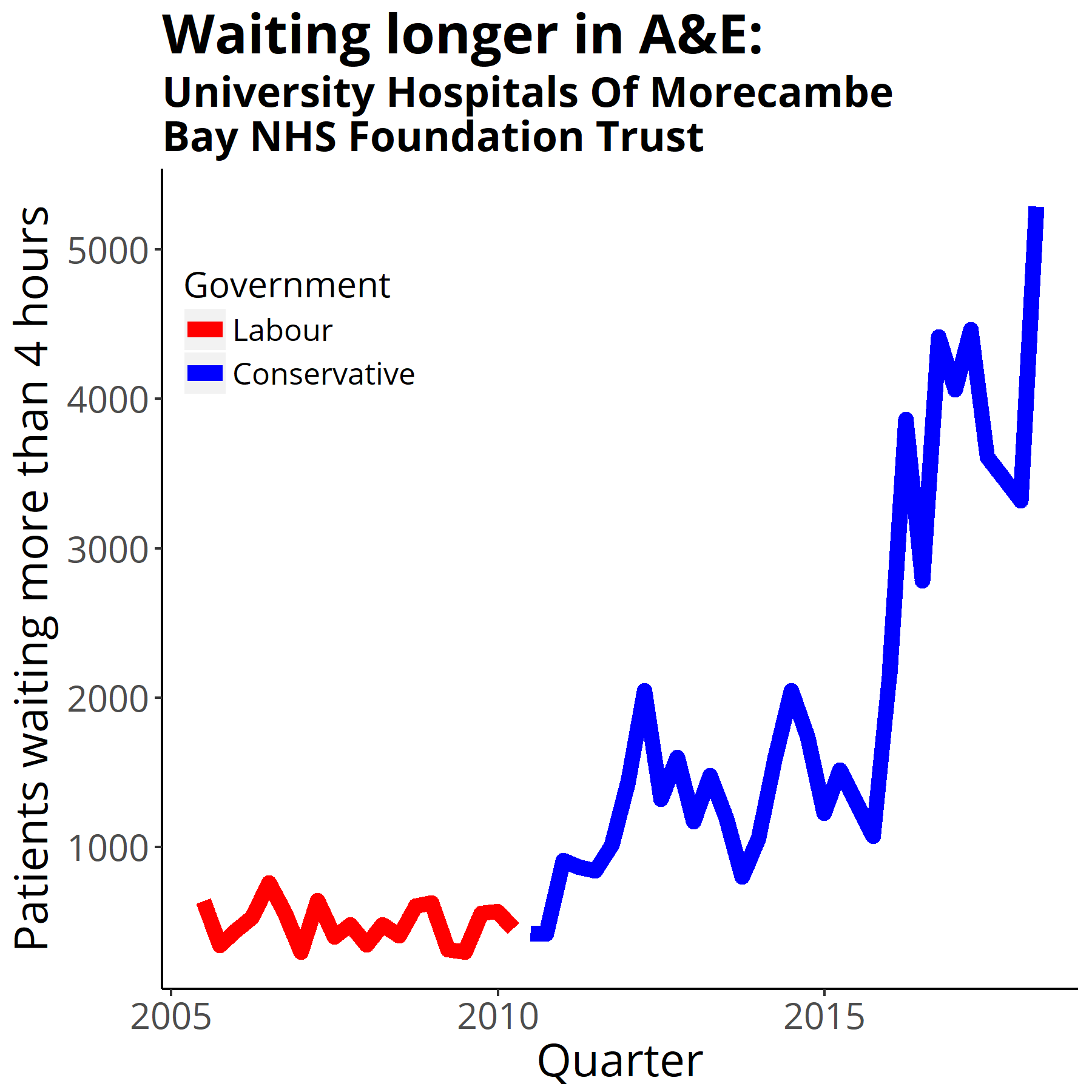
Four-hour target in the emergency department quarterly figures from NHS England Data from https://www.england.nhs.uk/statistics/statistical-work-areas/ae-waiting-times-and-activity/

The Trust was highlighted by NHS England as having 3 of 148 reported never events in the period from April to September 2013.

In December 2013, it was announced that despite the Furness General Hospital maternity ward deaths investigation, Cumbria Clinical Commissioning Group intends to maintain consultant-led maternity services at Furness General Hospital "for the foreseeable future".

In June 2014, the trust was placed in special measures by Monitor (NHS) after safety and leadership were rated inadequate by the Care Quality Commission. Services at Westmorland General Hospital were given an overall rating of "good", but Furness General Hospital and the Royal Lancaster Infirmary both "required improvement".

In February 2015, it was announced that the Clinical Commissioning Groups planned for inpatient elective surgery at Westmorland General Hospital to be transferred to Royal Lancaster Infirmary and Furness General Hospital.

The trust decided in October 2015 to contract out its outpatient pharmacy services to a private provider.

In 2014/5, the trust was given a loan of £21 million by the Department of Health which is supposed to be paid back in five years. It spent 7.2% of its total turnover on agency staff in 2014/5.

The trust was taken out of special measures in December 2015 after a further inspection.

== NHS Tariff ==
In August 2014, it was announced that the Trust would make an application to Monitor (NHS) for an increase in the prices paid for treatment by the NHS because its remote location made it impossible to manage within the national Payment by Results tariff.

In July 2015, the trust was the first, and so far only, to get an increase in the NHS tariff for its services agreed by Monitor (NHS) because of its "increased costs associated with this trust running health services across multiple sites in rural locations". It will get paid more per episode for accident and emergency, surgery, trauma and orthopaedics, paediatrics, women's health, and non-elective medical conditions. This is expected to increase the trust's income by more than £20 million per year.

== See also ==
- Furness General Hospital scandal
- Healthcare in Cumbria
- List of hospitals in England
- List of NHS Trusts
