= Ernest Macalpine Armstrong =

Scottish doctor and medical officer

Ernest Macalpine "Mac" Armstrong (born 3 June 1945) is a general practitioner and former Chief Medical Officer for Scotland.

== Early life ==
Armstrong was born in Motherwell, Lanarkshire, Scotland to Mary Brownlie McLean (née Macalpine) and Ernest Armstrong.

He was educated at the former Hamilton Academy. He then studied at the University of Glasgow obtaining a first class honours Bachelor of Science degree in physiology in 1968, before then graduating in 1970 with a medical degree with Honours.

== Career ==
Armstrong was a lecturer in pathology from 1971 to 1974 at the University of Glasgow. In 1974, he began training as a general practitioner (GP), then, in 1975, took up a position as a principal GP in a practice in Connel, Argyllshire.

In 1989, he was elected to the post of chairman of the Scottish GP Committee of the British Medical Association (BMA). He then became chair of the BMA's Scottish Council and then deputy chair of the BMA's General Medical Services Committee (GMSC). In 1993 he was appointed Secretary to the BMA. In this role he made efforts to develop relations between the healthcare professions.

In 2001, Armstrong was appointed Chief Medical Officer for Scotland succeeding Sir David Carter. During his time as CMO he had to deal with a decline in the uptake of the MMR vaccine and the subsequent rise in cases of measles. He also considered the impact of lifestyle choices that was affecting Scotland's population. He spoke in favour of a complete ban on smoking in public places and urged the Scottish Executive to take the lead and introduce legislation to this effect. He served as Chief Medical Officer until 2005.

He is chair of Alcohol Focus Scotland.

In April 2016 Armstrong publicly cancelled his membership of the BMA citing his disapproval of the strike action taken by junior doctors in England in response to a disputed new contract of employment being imposed.

Armstrong is a Fellow of the Royal College of Surgeons of Edinburgh; Fellow of the Royal College of Physicians and Surgeons of Glasgow; Fellow of the Royal College of Physicians of Edinburgh; Fellow of the Royal College of General Practitioners and Fellow of the Faculty of Public Health.

== Honours ==
Armstrong was invested as Companion of The Most Honourable Order of the Bath in 2005.

He was awarded an honorary Doctor of Laws degree by the University of Aberdeen in 2008.
