= Harry Burns (doctor) =

Scottish doctor

Sir Henry Burns (born 1951), known generally as Harry Burns, is the professor of global public health, University of Strathclyde, having been the Chief Medical Officer for Scotland from September 2005 to April 2014. He has become known for his work to address health inequalities. He is a member of the Council of Economic Advisers in Scotland.

== Early life ==
Henry Burns was born in Barrhead, East Renfrewshire, in 1951 and was educated at St. Aloysius College, a private school in Glasgow. In 1974 he graduated in medicine from the University of Glasgow.

== Career ==
Burns initially pursued a career in general surgery, and for five years he was a consultant surgeon at the Glasgow Royal Infirmary. He took up a managerial role as the medical director of the Glasgow Royal Infirmary. He completed a master's degree in Public Health in 1990. He worked as deputy director of planning and contracts at Greater Glasgow in 1992, becoming the director of public health for Greater Glasgow the following year. In 1999 he was awarded a visiting professorship in public health medicine at the University of Glasgow, and he also became a senior research fellow in the School of Business and Management at the university.

He took up the post of chief medical officer for Scotland on 5 September 2005. In 2007, his second annual report emphasised the importance of the early years as the basis for health and wellbeing in adulthood. He was co-chair of the Scottish Government's Early Years Taskforce which was set up in 2011. Burns helped Scotland conceptualise health improvement differently, being aware that the small gains that resulted from a range of interventions can add up to produce significant overall improvements.

In January 2014, it was announced that Burns would step down as chief medical officer in April 2014 to take up the appointment of Professor of global public health at Strathclyde University. He took part in Renfrewshire's Tackling Poverty Commission.

In December 2014, it was announced that Burns would join the Scottish Government's Council of Economic Advisers (CEA) to help look at the issue of inequality.

In September 2016, the Scottish Government announced that he would chair an independent review of targets in Scotland's NHS, with an initial report and recommendations expected in spring 2017.

== Honours ==
Burns was awarded an Honorary Doctorate from University of Strathclyde in 2008.

Burns received the Royal Environmental Health Institute of Scotland's Meritorious Endeavours in Environmental and Public Health Award in 2008.

Burns was knighted in the 2011 Birthday Honours in recognition of outstanding achievement and service to society.

His significant contribution to public life was also recognised by East Renfrewshire Council, who awarded him their highest honour, by making him an honorary freeman.

In December 2014, First Minister Nicola Sturgeon presented Burns with the Lifetime Achievement Award at the Holyrood Magazine-launched first Scottish Public Service Awards, recognising his lasting contributions to public service in Scotland.

== See also ==
- Glasgow effect
