= Godber =

Godber is a surname. Notable people with the surname include:

- Frederick Godber, 1st Baron Godber (1888–1976), British petroleum company executive
- Sir George Godber (1908–2009), British physician, Chief Medical Officer of England 1960–1973
- John Godber (born 1956), English playwright and screenwriter
- Joseph Godber, Baron Godber of Willington (1914–1980), British politician and cabinet minister
- Joyce Godber (1906–1999), British archivist and local historian
- Lennie Godber, fictional character in 1970s BBC sitcom Porridge
- Peter Godber (born 1922), British police officer, Chief Superintendent of the Royal Hong Kong Police Force, convicted for corruption
- Peter Godber (Canadian football) (born 1994), Canadian football offensive lineman
- W. T. Godber (1904–1981), English agriculturist and agricultural engineer
