= Cogwheel Report =

1967 report on doctors in UK hospitals

The Cogwheel Report (1967) or Report of the Joint Working Party on the Organisation of Medical Work in Hospitals was the report of a committee appointed by the Ministry of Health and chaired by George Godber to investigate the organisation of doctors in hospitals in England and Wales. It recommended arranging medical work by clinical divisions.

== Context ==
During the 1960s, there were controversies over pay for National Health Service doctors and perceived lack of trust between doctors and hospitals. Community services and hospitals were seen as poorly coordinated.

"A Hospital Plan for England and Wales" was published earlier in the decade and set a precedent for health planning and restructuring of services.

== Committee ==
The Joint Consultants' Committee and the Minister of Health created the joint working party "to consider what developments in the hospital service are desirable in order to promote improved efficiency in the organisation of medical work." John Howie Flint Brotherston was appointed to head a similar committee for the NHS in Scotland.

Sir George Godber, the Chief Medical Officer, was appointed chair of the committee. Nine of the committee members were doctors. Members included Dr John Owen Fisher Davies, Howard Granville Hanley, J.A. Hauff (Assistant Secretary, Ministry of Health), Dr Thomas Roland Hill, H.H. Langston (orthopaedic surgeon), Tom L.T. Lewis, Dr Richard Mayon Mayon White, Gordon McLachlan (Secretary of the Nuffield Provincial Hospitals Trust), Geoffrey Anderson Phalp (Secretary and Principal Administrative Officer, United Birmingham Hospitals), Sir Arthur Porritt, Sir John Richardson, Dr Kenneth Robson (registrar of the Royal College of Physicians), T.B. Williamson (who retired in February 1967 due to ill health), Dr H. Yellowlees, Dr I.T. Field and Dr G.R. Ford.

== Report ==
The committee published its report in 1967, soon after the Salmon Report. The report became known as the "Cogwheel Report" because of its cover design.

The Report recommended that doctors be more involved in management, with specialisms having responsibility for their own resources. A medical executive should then be formed from representatives of each specialism.

The Report noted that the three branches of the NHS (hospitals, general practice and local authority care) were unwieldy though efforts were being made to improve connections between them.

== Impact and critiques ==
Following the report, the Ministry of Health encouraged hospital authorities to implement the report's recommendations. "Cogwheel divisions" were organised and consultants in a substantial number of hospitals had adjusted organisational structures.

One critique of Cogwheel was that divisional structures were not always obvious, and sometimes resulted in medical physics, diagnostic radiology and pathology being grouped into a section for administrative purposes though they were quite different specialisms. Another was that it was unclear where medical social workers fit.

In 1972, a second report was published. This was based on a study of 85 junior hospital doctors during which more than 840,000 observations were made of more than 77,000 actions. The second report noted and approved local variations but disapproved of situations where junior doctors, nurses, administrative staff, general practitioners or medical officers of health were not included.

In 1974, the third report was published.

The impact of Cogwheel was limited by the reorganisation of the NHS in 1974, under which consensus management and multi-disciplinary teams were introduced.

== See also ==
- Seebohm Report
- Salmon Report
- Butterworth Report
