= Lord Richardson =

Lord Richardson may refer to:

- John Richardson, Baron Richardson (1910–2004), British physician and President of the General Medical Council from 1973 to 1980
- Gordon Richardson, Baron Richardson of Duntisbourne (1915–2010), British banker and Governor of the Bank of England from 1973 to 1983

== See also ==
- Kathleen Richardson, Baroness Richardson of Calow (born 1938), British Methodist minister
