= Joseph Godber =

British politician

The Right Honourable The Lord Godber of Willington PC
- Godber in 1970

Minister of Agriculture, Fisheries and Food
- In office 5 November 1972 – 4 March 1974
- Prime Minister: Edward Heath
- Preceded by: James Prior
- Succeeded by: Fred Peart

Minister of State for Foreign Affairs
- In office 19 June 1970 – 9 April 1972
- Prime Minister: Edward Heath
- Preceded by: The Lord Shepherd
- Succeeded by: The Baroness Tweedsmuir

Minister of Labour
- In office 21 October 1963 – 16 October 1964
- Prime Minister: Alec Douglas-Home
- Preceded by: John Hare
- Succeeded by: Ray Gunter

Secretary of State for War
- In office 27 June 1963 – 21 October 1963
- Prime Minister: Harold Macmillan
- Preceded by: John Profumo
- Succeeded by: James Ramsden

Member of Parliament for Grantham
- In office 25 October 1951 – 7 April 1979
- Preceded by: Eric Smith
- Succeeded by: Douglas Hogg

Personal details
- Born: 17 March 1914 Bedford, England
- Died: 25 August 1980 (aged 66) Bedford, England
- Party: Conservative
- Spouse: Miriam Sanders (m. 1936)
- Children: 2

Joseph Bradshaw Godber, Baron Godber of Willington, PC (17 March 1914 – 25 August 1980) was a British Conservative Party politician. He was the Member of Parliament for Grantham from 1951 to 1979 and held ministerial posts in the governments of Harold Macmillan, Alec Douglas-Home, and Edward Heath.

== Background ==
Godber was born in Bedford. He was educated at Bedford School, between 1922 and 1931, and became a nurseryman. He became chairman of the county glasshouse section of the National Farmers Union and of the publicity and parliamentary committee. He was a member of the Tomato and Cucumber Marketing Board.

== Political career ==
Godber was a Bedfordshire County Councillor from 1946 until 1952. He was elected Member of Parliament for Grantham in 1951, a seat he held until 1979. He served under Harold Macmillan as Parliamentary Secretary to the Ministry of Agriculture, Fisheries and Food from 1957 to 1960, as Parliamentary Under-Secretary of State for Foreign Affairs from 1960 to 1961, as Minister of State for Foreign Affairs from 1961 to 1963 and as Secretary of State for War in 1963, under Sir Alec Douglas-Home as Minister of Labour from 1963 to 1964 and under Edward Heath as Minister of State for Foreign and Commonwealth Affairs from 1970 to 1972 and as Minister of Agriculture, Fisheries and Food from 1972 to 1974. Godber was appointed a Privy Counsellor in 1963 and in 1979 he was made a life peer as Baron Godber of Willington, of Willington in the County of Bedfordshire.

== Personal life ==
In 1936, Godber married Miriam Sanders in Bedford. They had two sons (including one born in 1938 and the other in 1944). Godber died in Bedford in 1980.

A number of Godber's siblings distinguished themselves in later life:

- W. T. Godber, adviser to the British Government on agricultural matters, President of the East of England Agricultural Society, Chairman of the Bedfordshire Agricultural Executive Committee and the Farmers' Club;
- Sir George Godber GCB, Chief Medical Officer of the United Kingdom;
- Joyce Godber, historian of Bedfordshire and author;
- Rowland John Godber, owner of a rubber plantation in Malaya and later a prisoner of war. The diary of his experiences as a prisoner of war are extant and held by the Imperial War Museum; and
- Geoffrey Chapman Godber, CBE DL, Chief executive of West Sussex County Council.

Parliament of the United Kingdom
Preceded by Eric Smith	Member of Parliament for Grantham; 1951–1979	Succeeded by Hon. Douglas Hogg
Political offices
Preceded by John Profumo	Secretary of State for War; 1963	Succeeded by James Ramsden
Preceded by Hon. John Hare	Minister of Labour; 1963-64	Succeeded by Ray Gunter
Preceded by Jim Prior	Minister of Agriculture, Fisheries and Food; 1972-74	Succeeded by Fred Peart
