= Joyce Godber =

English local historian

- Born: Amy Joyce Godber; 1906; Bedfordshire, England
- Died: 1999 (aged 92–93)
- Occupations: Archivist and local historian
- Employer(s): Oxford University Press, Institute of Historical Research
- Organization(s): Bedfordshire Historical Record Society, Society of Archivists, British Records Association
- Known for: History of Bedfordshire 1066–1888 (1969)
- Relatives: William Godber (brother), George Godber (brother), Joseph Godber (brother)

Joyce Godber (1906–1999) was an English local historian, the county archivist of Bedfordshire and the author of a number of books about the history of that county.

== Biography ==
Christened Amy Joyce Godber, Godber was born in 1906, in Bedfordshire. She was the daughter of Isaac Godber and Bessie Godber. She had six brothers: agricultural expert William Godber, physician and Chief Medical Officer George Godber, rubber plantation owner John Godber, council executive Geoffrey Godber, Conservative party politician Joseph Godber, and Frank Godber.

Godber studied for a history degree and briefly worked as a teacher. She was employed by the Oxford University Press before becoming assistant secretary at the Institute of Historical Research. She subsequently became clerk of the records and county archivist for Bedfordshire, where she oversaw the planning of a new repository in the County Hall, now known as Borough Hall and expanded the number staff working in the archives. She retired in 1968 and was succeeded as archivist by her colleague Patricia Bell.

Godber was editor of the publications of the Bedfordshire Historical Record Society from 1945 to 1977. She was also an active member of the Society of Archivists and the British Records Association.

Godber's major work was her History of Bedfordshire 1066–1888 (1969). Among her other publications was a history of the local Quaker religious movement: Friends in Bedfordshire and West Hertfordshire and a history of charity the Harpur Trust.

Godber died in 1999.

== Selected publications ==
- The Cartulary of Newnham Priory. 2 volumes. Bedford: Bedfordshire Historical Record Society, 1963–1964.
- The Oakley Hunt. Bedford: Bedfordshire Historical Record Society, 1965.
- History of Bedfordshire, 1066–1888. Bedford: Bedfordshire County Council, 1969.
- John Bunyan of Bedfordshire. Bedford: Bedfordshire County Council, 1972.
- The Harpur Trust, 1552-1973. Bedford: Harpur Trust, 1973.
- Friends in Bedfordshire and West Hertfordshire. Willington: Joyce Godber, 1975.
- John Howard the Philanthropist. Bedford: Bedfordshire County Council, 1977.
- The Story of Bedford: an outline history. Luton: White Crescent Press, 1978.
