= Black armband =

Symbol of mourning

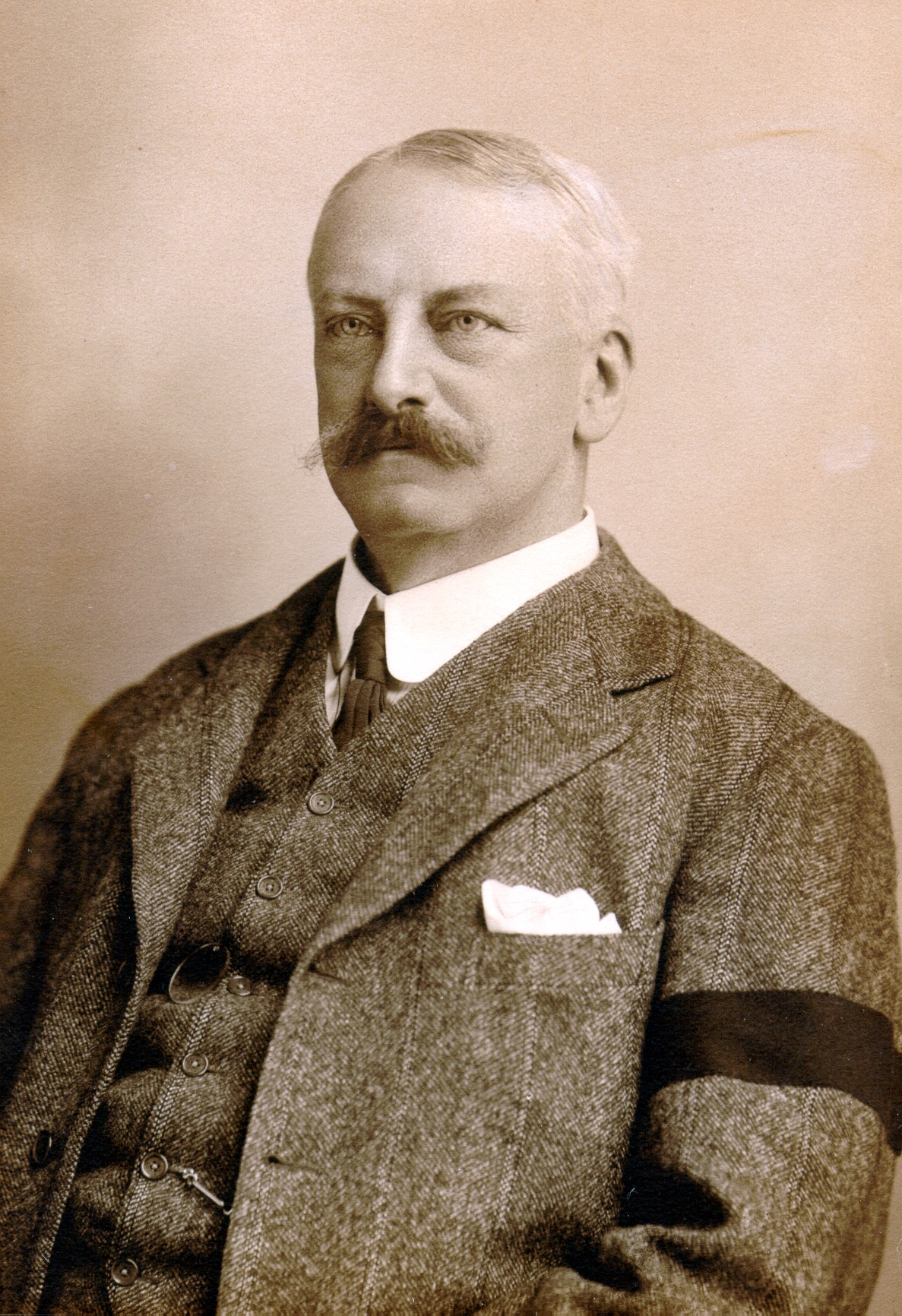
Richard Norris Wolfenden wearing a black armband, c. 1905.

A black armband is an armband that is coloured black to signify that the wearer is in mourning or wishes to identify with the commemoration of a family member or friend who has died.

In sport, especially association football, cricket, and Australian rules football, players will often wear black armbands following the death of a former player or manager.

Black armbands are also worn by uniformed organizations, such as the police, fire services or military, at the funeral or on the death of a sovereign.

== Historical gallery ==
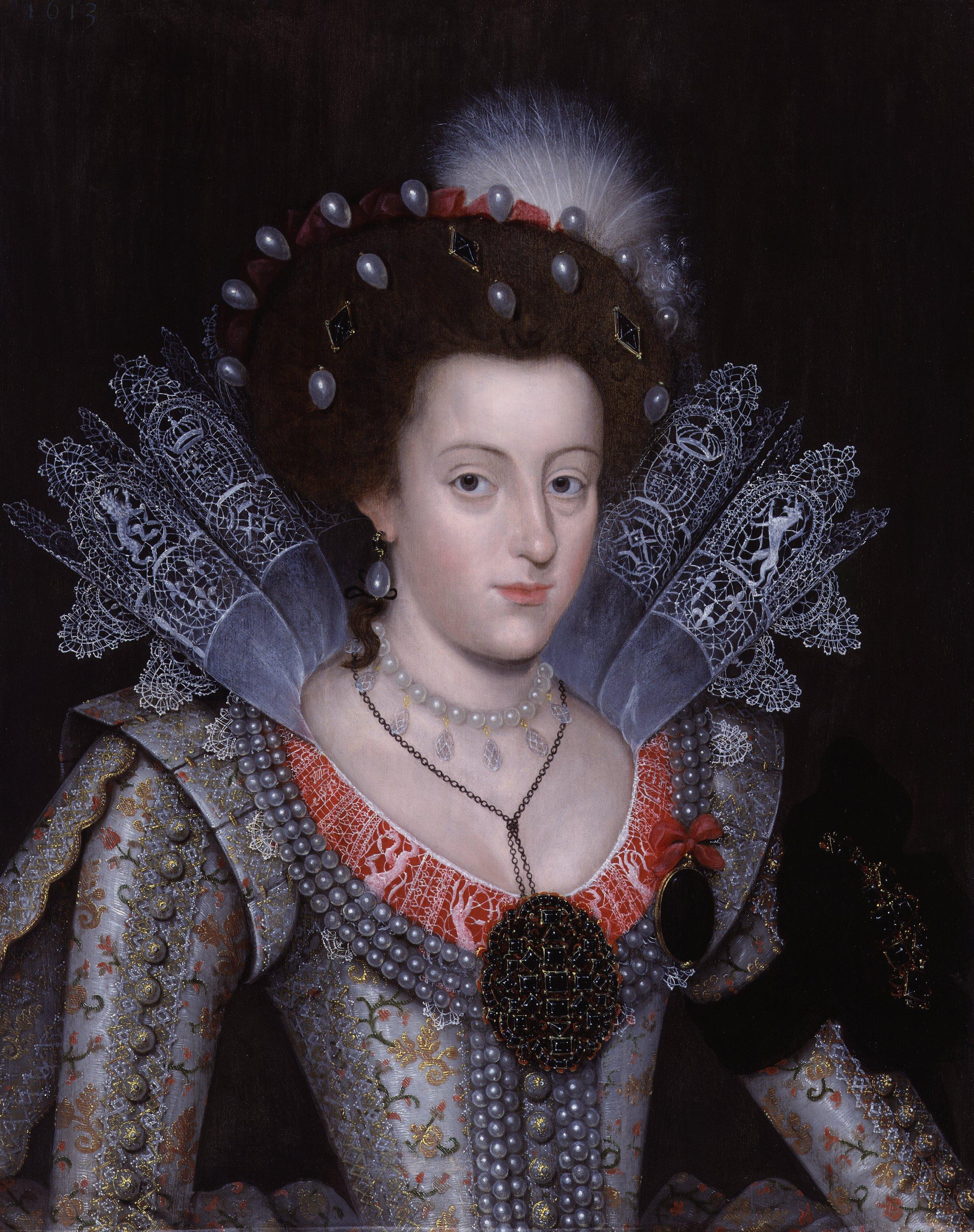
Elizabeth Stuart, Queen of Bohemia wearing a black armband in a 1614 portrait

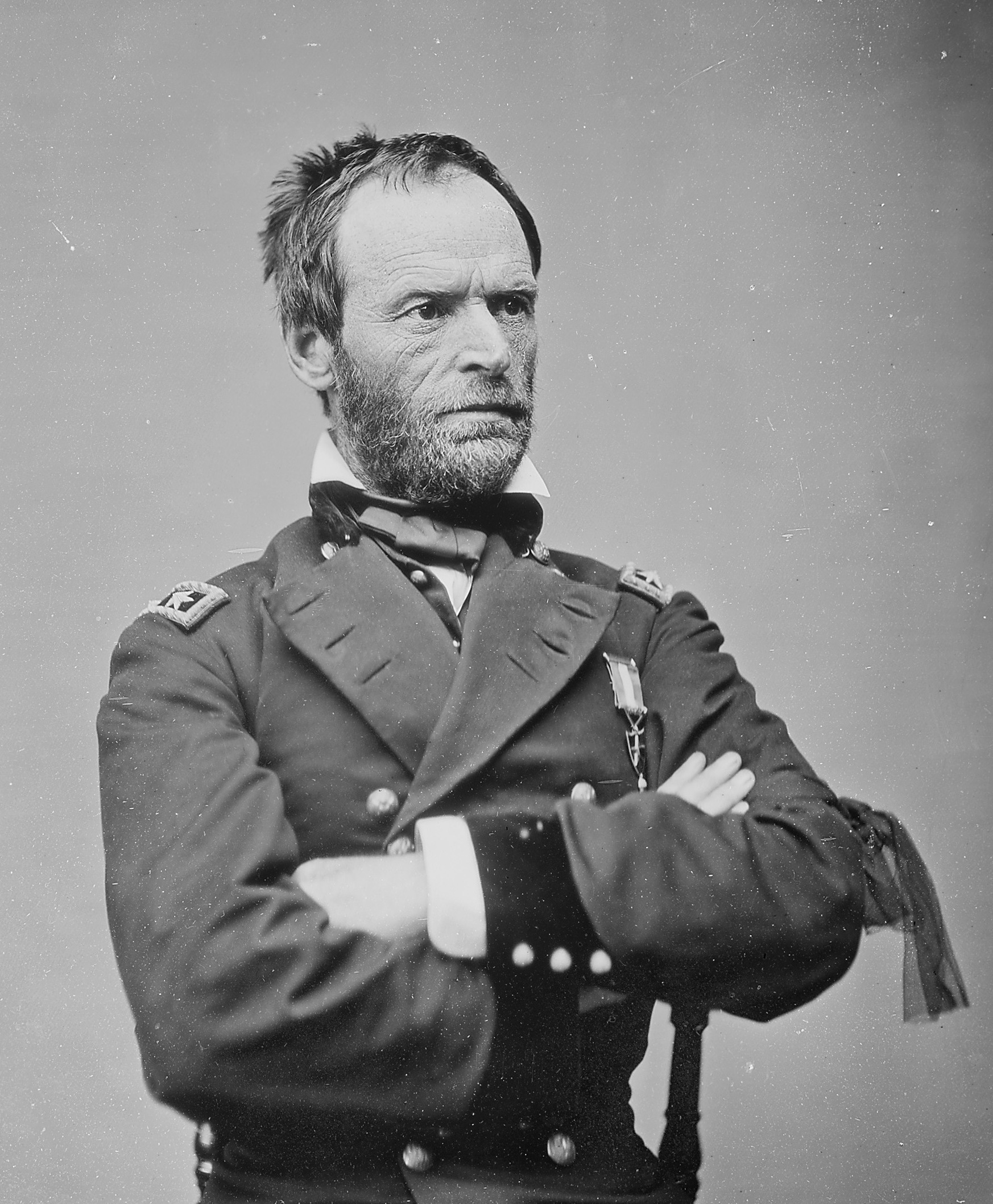
William Tecumseh Sherman in May 1865, wearing a black ribbon after the assassination of Abraham Lincoln

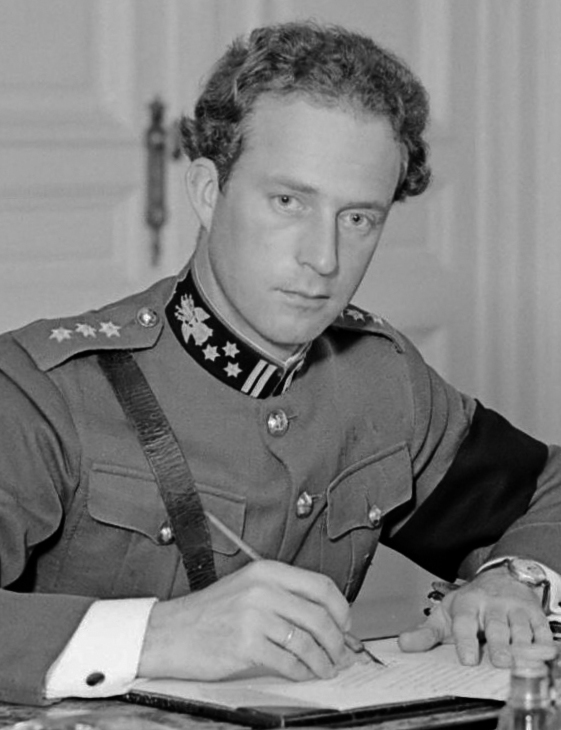
Leopold III of Belgium, wearing a black armband contemporary with his ascension to the throne following the death of his father, Albert I

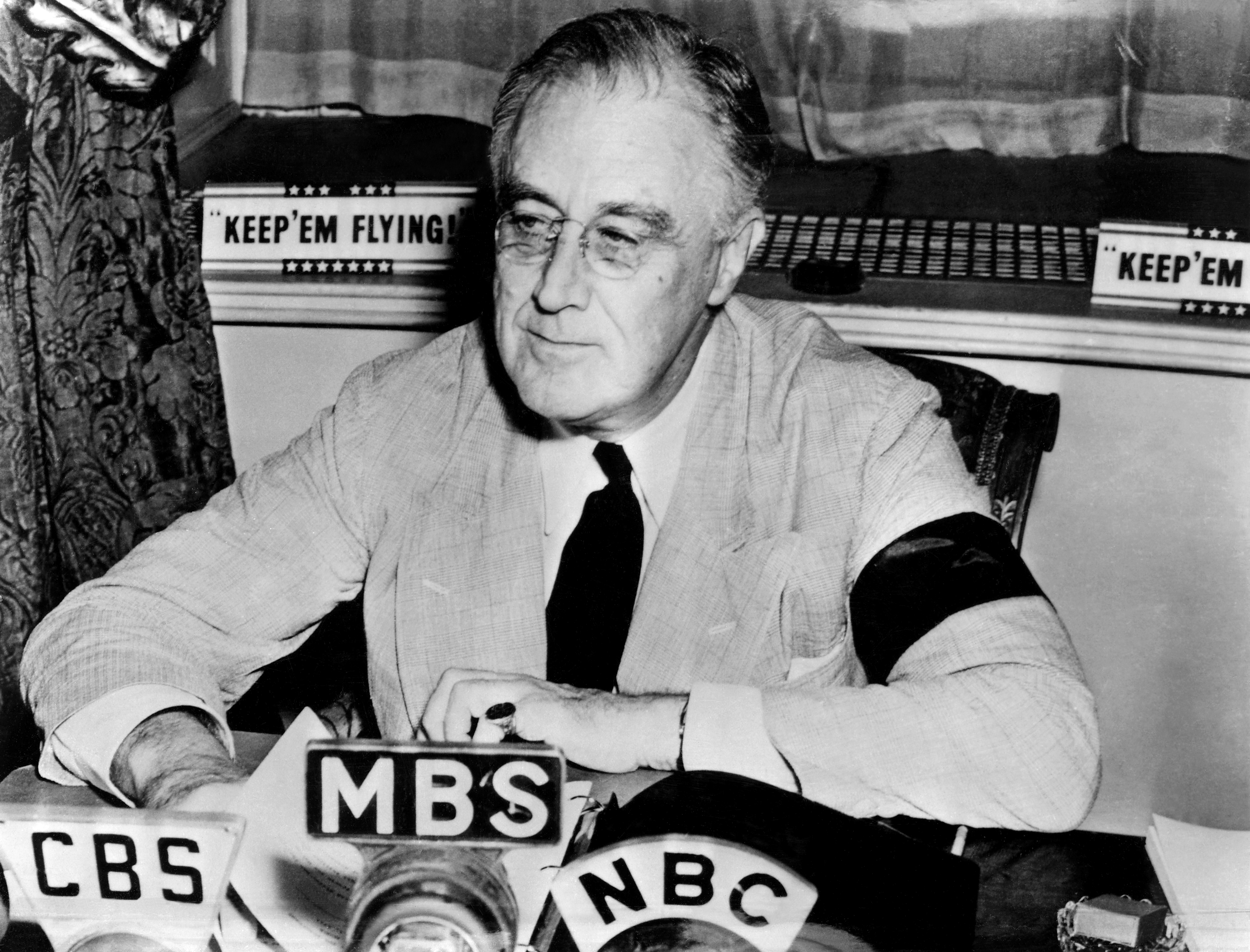
Franklin D. Roosevelt wearing a black armband in mourning of his mother

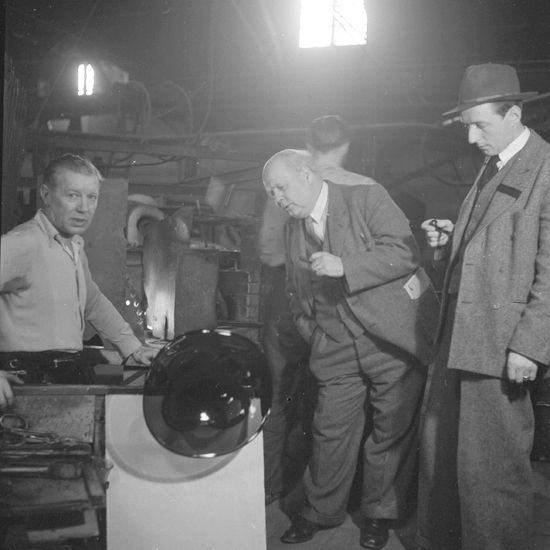
A man wearing a mourning band on his lapel in a glassworks, Sweden, ca 1940–41

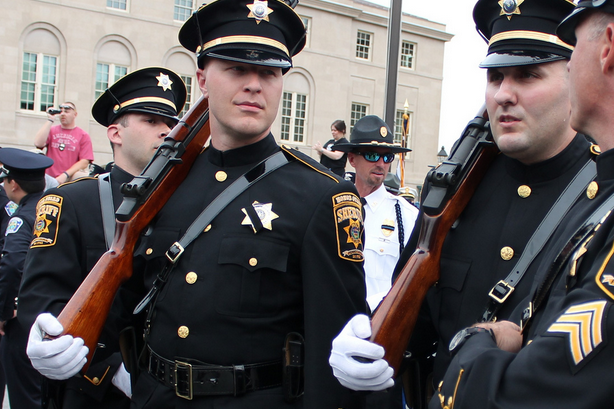
A Berks County deputy sheriff wearing a mourning band on his badge, in Washington, DC, 2012

== Use in protest ==
In 1965, five students in Des Moines, Iowa, protested silently against the Vietnam War by wearing black armbands in school. The resulting suspension and legal challenges led in 1969 to the landmark U.S. Supreme Court case Tinker v. Des Moines, which held that the students' armbands did not create a "substantial disruption" and therefore were constitutionally protected under the First Amendment.

At the 2003 Cricket World Cup in Harare, two players from the Zimbabwe national cricket team wore armbands made of black electrical tape to symbolically mourn "the death of democracy" in Zimbabwe. This protest was praised abroad and condemned locally, and both men ultimately moved to the United Kingdom.

== Use in popular culture ==
Guns N' Roses referenced the use of black armbands in their 1991 protest song "Civil War" with the lyric "D'you wear a black armband when they shot the man who said 'peace could last forever?'" This is a reference to the assassination of U.S. President John F. Kennedy in 1963 and the assassination of civil rights leader Martin Luther King Jr. in 1968, both of whom were famous for seeking peace.

== See also ==
- 21-gun salute
- Ten-bell salute
- Three-volley salute
