= Jack Butterworth, Baron Butterworth =

The Right Honourable The Lord Butterworth CBE DL

Member of the House of Lords
- Lord Temporal
- Life peerage 15 May 1985 – 19 June 2003

Personal details
- Born: 13 March 1918
- Died: 19 June 2003 (aged 85)

John Blackstocke Butterworth, Baron Butterworth, CBE, DL (13 March 1918 – 19 June 2003) was a British lawyer and the first Vice-Chancellor of the University of Warwick. He was the chair of the committee that published the Butterworth Report on social work in 1972.

Butterworth graduated in jurisprudence from Oxford University. On the eve of the Second World War he enlisted in the Royal Artillery and spent much of the war in Scotland, protecting strategic targets from air attack.

== Background and family ==
He qualified in 1946 as a barrister at Lincoln's Inn, and then became a law tutor at New College, Oxford. He had a reputation as an outstanding teacher and he was made an Honorary Bencher of Lincoln's Inn in 1953. He was quick-witted and shrewd, which accounts for his appointment as bursar of New College for the last seven years of his time at Oxford.

Butterworth married his wife Doris in 1948 and they had one son and two daughters, including Anna Walker, who became a senior civil servant of some distinction.

== University of Warwick ==
In 1963, he became the first Vice-Chancellor of the University of Warwick. Warwick was one of the handful of new universities created in the wake of the Robbins Report (1962). One of his colleagues at the time described him as "a noisy" vice-chancellor.

Butterworth believed strongly that his job was to select professors who would be leaders in their discipline and that he should stand aside and let them develop their subjects in their own way (though within a tight budget). Because he had worked only at Oxford, he wanted Oxford's standards of academic performance at the undergraduate level and in research. He had a belief that Warwick must maintain a balance between 'pure' and 'applied' disciplines: you could justify a strong commitment to the Humanities if you had a Business School, a very pure Maths Department if you had Engineering.

A large part of Warwick's success stems from Butterworth's cultivation of links with the rich industrial enterprises of the Midlands. One of his first creations was an industrial centre, intended as a stimulus of advanced engineering in the region. Similarly, he cultivated (and earned) municipal goodwill.

He also built the Warwick Arts Centre. His link with Miss Martin, the famous 'Anonymous Benefactor', represented the crucial launching pad for the project, but funds came from many sources including a contribution for the third and final phase from the about to be abolished West Midlands County Council whose gift was steered through by a Coventry Councillor. It was somehow typical that Butterworth, whose politics could not have been more different, could persuade a left wing politician that such a project deserved support. He traded on the sympathies of his friends on grantmaking committees for consideration of Warwick and held forth without giving quarter to ministers he happened to bump into in corridors.

Butterworth's period as vice-chancellor was not without controversy, particularly regarding his opposition to the establishment of a Students' union. Above the main bar of the Students Union building at Warwick University there is an inscription quoting him as saying "The Students' union shall never have its own building". His period of office included the student protests beginning in the late 1960s. During one event the vice-chancellor's office was occupied and files rummaged through. These protests were supported by the social historian, the late Professor Edward Thompson, one of Butterworth's own appointments.

Butterworth was a trustee of the Fund for International Student Co-operation, an alleged Central Intelligence Agency front, in 1967.

== Other activities ==
In 1966 Butterworth was appointed a member of a Royal Commission to inquire into the working of the Tribunals of Inquiry (Evidence) Act 1921.

His other passions were the Association of Commonwealth Universities, a post-imperial organisation devoted to providing assistance to anglophone universities in developing countries, of which he was chairman for ten years; and the Foundation for Science and Technology, of which he became chairman in 1990, subsequently holding the position of president until his death.

Butterworth was also the chairman of Midland Community Radio, the consortium which successfully bid for the Independent Local Radio franchise for Coventry and Warwickshire. The radio station launched as Mercia Sound in 1980.

== Honours ==
Butterworth was appointed a Deputy Lieutenant for Warwickshire in 1967.

He was appointed a Commander of the Order of the British Empire (CBE) in the 1982 Birthday Honours.

He was appointed to the House of Lords as a life peer on retirement from the university in 1985. He was created Baron Butterworth, of Warwick in the County of Warwickshire on 15 May 1985, and he took the Conservative whip.

Coat of arms of Jack Butterworth, Baron Butterworth

Crest
Rising from a tree stock couped Sable a phoenix Or in flames Proper grasping in the dexter claw a millrind Sable.
Escutcheon
Sable on a fess Argent a representation of a DNA double helix spirals Azure lined Gules with connecting lines Or and in chief two bears erect Argent muzzled Gules and in base an elephant also erect each standing against a ragged staff Argent and collared and chained Or the chain reflexed over the back round the foot of the staff and ending in a ring Gold.
Supporters
Upon a compartment comprising a grassy mount strewn with buttercups Proper on either side a little owl Proper charged on the neck with a representation of a DNA double helix as in the arms.
Motto
The Fear Of The Lord Is The Beginning Of Wisdom

Academic offices
New university	Vice-Chancellor of the University of Warwick; 1965–1985	Succeeded by Clark L. Brundin
