= 1973 Bedford District Council election =

1973 UK local government election

The 1973 Bedford District Council election took place on 10 May 1973 to elect members of Bedford District Council in England. This was the same day as other local elections.

== Overall Results ==
1973 North Bedfordshire Borough Council election
Party	Seats	Gains	Losses	Net gain/loss	Seats %	Votes %	Votes	+/−
Labour	22	0	0	0	39.3	34.9	11,468	0
Conservative	20	0	0	0	35.7	33.5	11,017	0
Independent	11	0	0	0	19.6	19.6	6,430	0
Liberal	2	0	0	0	3.6	10.0	3,289	0
Ind. Conservative	1	0	0	0	1.8	0.8	262	0
Residents	0	0	0	0	0	0.7	252	0
Independent Labour	0	0	0	0	0	0.3	93	0
Communist	0	0	0	0	0	0.2	74	0

A total of 32,885 valid votes were cast.
The turnout was 37.8%

After the election the composition of the council was:

↓
22	2	11	1	20
Labour	Liberal	Independent	Ind Con	Conservative

== Ward results ==
=== Cauldwell ===
No. 1 (Cauldwell) - 4 seats
Party	Candidate	Votes	%	±%
Labour	W. Astle	1,301	74.7	
Labour	J. Ansell-Sutton	1,254	72.0	
Labour	R. Elford	1,208	69.4	
Labour	V. Storrow	1,167	67.0	
Conservative	A. Coles	440	25.3	
Conservative	V. Fattorusso	279	16.0	
Majority		861	49.5	
Turnout		1,741	31.2	
Labour win (new seat)				
Labour win (new seat)				
Labour win (new seat)				
Labour win (new seat)				

=== De Parys ===
No. 2 (De Parys) - 6 seats
Party	Candidate	Votes	%	±%
Conservative	A. Randall	1,673	47.3	
Conservative	R. Gwynne-Jones	1,671	47.2	
Conservative	D. Lennox-Lamb	1,650	46.6	
Conservative	R. Whittingham	1,649	46.6	
Conservative	E. Smith	1,546	43.7	
Conservative	G. Senior	1,482	41.9	
Liberal	A. Crouch	1,139	32.2	
Liberal	J. Burley	1,103	31.2	
Liberal	J. Barnes	1,100	31.1	
Liberal	J. Fennell	974	27.5	
Liberal	C. Steptoe	881	24.9	
Liberal	R. Cunnick	854	24.1	
Labour	K. Davies	726	20.5	
Labour	R. Richardson	715	20.2	
Labour	G. Blowers	715	20.2	
Labour	M. Kirk	684	19.3	
Labour	B. Ashton	681	19.2	
Labour	B. Jackson	663	18.7	
Majority		534	15.1	
Turnout		3,538	37.9	
Conservative win (new seat)				
Conservative win (new seat)				
Conservative win (new seat)				
Conservative win (new seat)				
Conservative win (new seat)				
Conservative win (new seat)				

=== Goldington ===
No. 3 (Goldington) - 6 seats
Party	Candidate	Votes	%	±%
Liberal	J. Slatter	1,475	37.0	
Labour	R. Wildman	1,435	36.0	
Labour	G. Robbins	1,427	35.8	
Labour	S. Ayre	1,350	33.8	
Liberal	A. Lennon	1,346	33.7	
Labour	V. Tilley	1,311	32.9	
Labour	K. Passant	1,303	32.7	
Labour	F. Garrick	1,302	32.6	
Liberal	J. Lennon	1,270	31.8	
Liberal	P. Smith	1,250	31.3	
Liberal	J. Yunnie	1,215	30.5	
Conservative	H. Bushell	1,080	27.1	
Conservative	C. Frost	1,025	25.7	
Conservative	E. Bushell	1,007	25.2	
Conservative	J. Hitchcock	986	24.7	
Conservative	M. Palmer	944	23.7	
Conservative	A. Johns	943	23.6	
Majority		40	1.0	
Turnout		3,990	40.9	
Liberal win (new seat)				
Labour win (new seat)				
Labour win (new seat)				
Labour win (new seat)				
Liberal win (new seat)				
Labour win (new seat)				

=== Harpur ===
No. 4 (Harpur) - 5 seats
Party	Candidate	Votes	%	±%
Independent	B. Dillingham	1,672	44.3	
Independent	M. Still	1,524	40.4	
Independent	G. Orr	1,264	33.5	
Labour	M. Cotter	840	22.3	
Labour	T. Brown	823	21.8	
Labour	K. Derrick	808	21.4	
Labour	B. Jones	789	20.9	
Labour	F. Tysoe	712	18.9	
Conservative	D. Little	542	14.4	
Conservative	J. Ogunremi	540	14.3	
Conservative	E. Knights	539	14.3	
Liberal	R. Foster	515	13.6	
Liberal	B. Nutley	502	13.3	
Liberal	B. Foster	483	12.8	
Liberal	J. Jones	406	10.8	
Liberal	D. Pratt	378	10.0	
Residents	P. Horn	206	5.5	
Majority		832	22.0	
Turnout		3,775	50.7	
Independent win (new seat)				
Independent win (new seat)				
Independent win (new seat)				
Labour win (new seat)				
Labour win (new seat)				

=== Kingsbrook ===
No. 5 (Kingsbrook) - 4 seats
Party	Candidate	Votes	%	±%
Labour	K. Scott	1,340	79.8	
Labour	G. Colling	1,266	75.4	
Labour	T. Mansell	1,242	74.0	
Labour	D. Upton	1,192	71.0	
Conservative	S. Sanders	265	15.8	
Conservative	R. Attree	244	14.5	
Communist	P. Waite	74	4.4	
Majority		1,075	64.0	
Turnout		1,679	29.7	
Labour win (new seat)				
Labour win (new seat)				
Labour win (new seat)				
Labour win (new seat)				

=== Newnham ===
No. 6 (Newnham) - 4 seats
Party	Candidate	Votes	%	±%
Conservative	E. Valentine	1,352	62.1	
Conservative	J. Cook	1,323	60.8	
Conservative	D. Bygrave	1,244	57.2	
Conservative	T. Donnelly	1,240	57.0	
Labour	S. Symes	824	37.9	
Labour	F. Burdett	783	36.0	
Labour	R. Crane	765	35.2	
Labour	C. Turner	724	33.3	
Majority		528	24.3	
Turnout		2,176	32.2	
Conservative win (new seat)				
Conservative win (new seat)				
Conservative win (new seat)				
Conservative win (new seat)				

=== Queens Park ===
No. 7 (Queens Park) - 3 seats
Party	Candidate	Votes	%	±%
Conservative	R. Sharman	1,453	51.1	
Labour	J. George	1,388	48.9	
Conservative	J. Ireland	1,154	40.6	
Labour	P. Holman	1,131	39.8	
Conservative	N. Wright	1,059	37.3	
Labour	S. Pass	1,040	36.6	
Majority		65	2.3	
Turnout		2,841	60.8	
Conservative win (new seat)				
Labour win (new seat)				
Conservative win (new seat)				

=== Bromham ===
No. 8 (Bromham) - 2 seats
Party	Candidate	Votes	%	±%
Conservative	V. Cartwright	842	84.5	
Conservative	G. Bates	804	80.7	
Labour	S. Hunt	154	15.5	
Labour	A. Wood	144	14.5	
Majority		688	69.1	
Turnout		996	31.3	
Conservative win (new seat)				
Conservative win (new seat)				

=== Oakley ===
No. 10 (Oakley)
Party	Candidate	Votes	%	±%
Independent	G. Beazley	438	60.7	
Liberal	L. Skevington	160	22.2	
Labour	S. Jones	123	17.1	
Majority		278	38.6	
Turnout		721	40.2	
Independent win (new seat)				

=== Carlton & Harrold ===
No. 11 (Carlton & Harrold)
Party	Candidate	Votes	%	±%
Independent	V. Brandon	562	61.3	
Independent	H. Tusting	227	24.8	
Labour	M. Woods	109	11.9	
Independent	P. Smith	19	2.1	
Majority		335	36.5	
Turnout		917	50.6	
Independent win (new seat)				

=== Felmersham & Sharnbrook ===
No. 12 (Felmersham & Sharnbrook)
Party	Candidate	Votes	%	±%
Independent	H. Martin	383	58.5	
Independent	R. Payne	272	41.5	
Majority		111	16.9	
Turnout		655	36.5	
Independent win (new seat)				

=== Knotting & Souldrop ===
No. 13 (Knotting & Souldrop)
Party	Candidate	Votes	%	±%
Ind. Conservative	D. Cooper	262	45.2	
Independent	R. Wilson	217	37.4	
Labour	S. Zaramba	101	17.4	
Majority		45	7.8	
Turnout		580	44.5	
Ind. Conservative win (new seat)				

=== Swineshead ===
No. 14 (Swineshead)
Party	Candidate	Votes	%	±%
Conservative	S. Cocksedge	0	0.0	
Majority		0	0.0	
Turnout		0	0.0	
Conservative win (new seat)				

=== Riseley ===
No. 15 (Riseley)
Party	Candidate	Votes	%	±%
Independent	J. Swepston	296	50.1	
Conservative	E. Gibbs	295	49.9	
Majority		1	0.2	
Turnout		591	36.1	
Independent win (new seat)				

=== Roxton ===
No. 17 (Roxton)
Party	Candidate	Votes	%	±%
Independent	P. Merton-Jones	0	0.0	
Majority		0	0.0	
Turnout		0	0.0	
Independent win (new seat)				

=== Kempston Rural ===
No. 21 (Kempston Rural)
Party	Candidate	Votes	%	±%
Independent	G. Frossell	520	60.0	
Labour	R. Woods	347	40.0	
Majority		173	20.0	
Turnout		867	49.1	
Independent win (new seat)				

=== Wootton ===
No. 22 (Wootton)
Party	Candidate	Votes	%	±%
Independent	P. Chennells	597	61.7	
Labour	R. Barrow	370	38.3	
Majority		227	23.5	
Turnout		967	44.4	
Independent win (new seat)				

=== Turvey ===
No. 23 (Turvey)
Party	Candidate	Votes	%	±%
Conservative	G. Newman	443	64.1	
Independent	E. Kent	248	35.9	
Majority		195	28.2	
Turnout		691	49.9	
Conservative win (new seat)				

=== Kempston ===
No. 24 (Kempston) - 6 seats
Party	Candidate	Votes	%	±%
Labour	M. Baldwin	1,532	54.1	
Labour	A. Burton	1,529	54.0	
Labour	K. Burley	1,511	53.4	
Labour	R. West	1,454	51.4	
Labour	R. Lescott	1,441	50.9	
Conservative	P. Hooley	1,299	45.9	
Conservative	C. Wilson	1,275	45.0	
Conservative	P. Grange	1,272	44.9	
Conservative	W. Martin	1,247	44.0	
Conservative	T. Ryan	1,208	42.7	
Conservative	A. Rayment	1,168	41.3	
Labour	A. Blair	677	23.9	
Majority		233	8.2	
Turnout		2,831	30.5	
Labour win (new seat)				
Labour win (new seat)				
Labour win (new seat)				
Labour win (new seat)				
Labour win (new seat)				
Conservative win (new seat)				

=== Clapham ===
Clapham - 2 seats
Party	Candidate	Votes	%	±%
Labour	G. Mason	504	37.6	
Labour	J. Parr	444	33.2	
Independent	E. Stratford	435	32.5	
Conservative	L. Bradford	400	29.9	
Majority		69	5.2	
Turnout		1,339	45.7	
Labour win (new seat)				
Labour win (new seat)				

=== Eastcotts ===
Eastcotts
Party	Candidate	Votes	%	±%
Conservative	F. Hall	246	37.2	
Labour	R. Page	232	35.0	
Ind. Labour Party	K. Sillett	93	14.0	
Residents	R. Harpur	46	6.9	
Independent	A. Kilminster	45	6.8	
Majority		14	2.1	
Turnout		662	44.2	
Conservative win (new seat)				

=== Great Barford ===
Great Barford
Party	Candidate	Votes	%	±%
Independent	V. Webb	252	50.9	
Conservative	V. Farrar	243	49.1	
Majority		9	1.8	
Turnout		495	29.4	
Independent win (new seat)				

=== Renhold ===
Renhold
Party	Candidate	Votes	%	±%
Conservative	N. Polhill	0	0.0	
Majority		0	0.0	
Turnout		0	0.0	
Conservative win (new seat)				

=== Wilshamstead ===
Wilshamstead
Party	Candidate	Votes	%	±%
Conservative	V. Wisson	444	53.3	
Labour	F. Tompkins	142	17.0	
Independent	C. Taylor	134	16.1	
Independent	C. Simmonds	113	13.6	
Majority		302	36.3	
Turnout		833	46.9	
Conservative win (new seat)				
