= George Herbert Fowler =

George Herbert Fowler CBE (4 September 1861, Lincoln – 15 August 1940, Aspley Guise) was an English zoologist, historian and archivist.

Fowler was educated at Marlborough College, Eton College and Keble College, Oxford. From 1887 to 1889 he was assistant to E. Ray Lankester at University College, London. In 1890 he was interim director of the recently founded Plymouth laboratory of the Marine Biological Association. In 1891 he returned to teaching zoology at UCL. Fowler and R. Norris Wolfenden founded the Challenger Society for Marine Science in 1903. Fowler retired from UCL in 1909.

In retirement Fowler lived at Aspley Guise, Bedfordshire, and his interests turned to local history. He established the Bedfordshire Historical Record Society in 1912 and the Bedfordshire Record Office in 1913, continuing to serve as chairman of the county records committee until 1940.

During World War I he worked in hydrographic and naval intelligence, preparing charts for use by submarines. He was appointed a Commander of the Order of the British Empire in the 1918 New Year Honours for his efforts during the First World War.

In 1923 he published The Care of County Muniments, which remained for many years the only manual in English relating to the care of local archives. He was also active in the establishment of the British Records Association in 1932.
