= Old Town Hall, Bedford =

Municipal building in Bedford, Bedfordshire, England

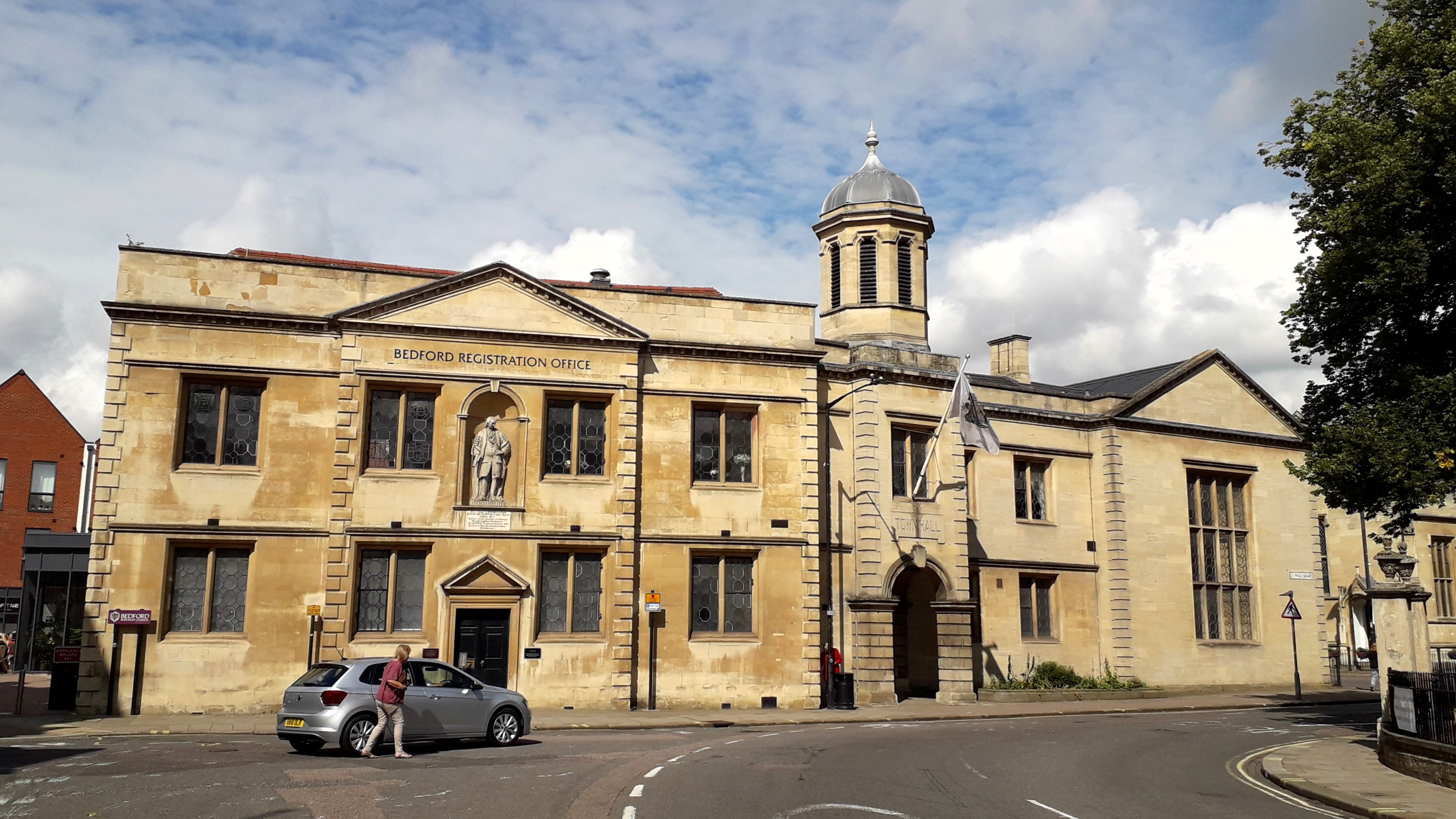
- Old Town Hall

- Shown in Bedfordshire
- 52.1353°N 0.4684°W
- Location: Bedford

History
- Built: 1550

Site notes
- Architect: Isaac Clayson
- Architectural style: Neoclassical style

Listed Building – Grade II
- Official name: Town Hall
- Designated: 6 June 1952
- Reference no.: 1114520

Listed Building – Grade II
- Official name: North Extension (Civic Theatre) to Town Hall
- Designated: 14 May 1971
- Reference no.: 1321439

The Old Town Hall is a municipal building in St Paul's Square in Bedford, Bedfordshire, England. The building, which was the headquarters of Bedford Borough Council from 1892 to 2009, is a Grade II listed building.

== History ==
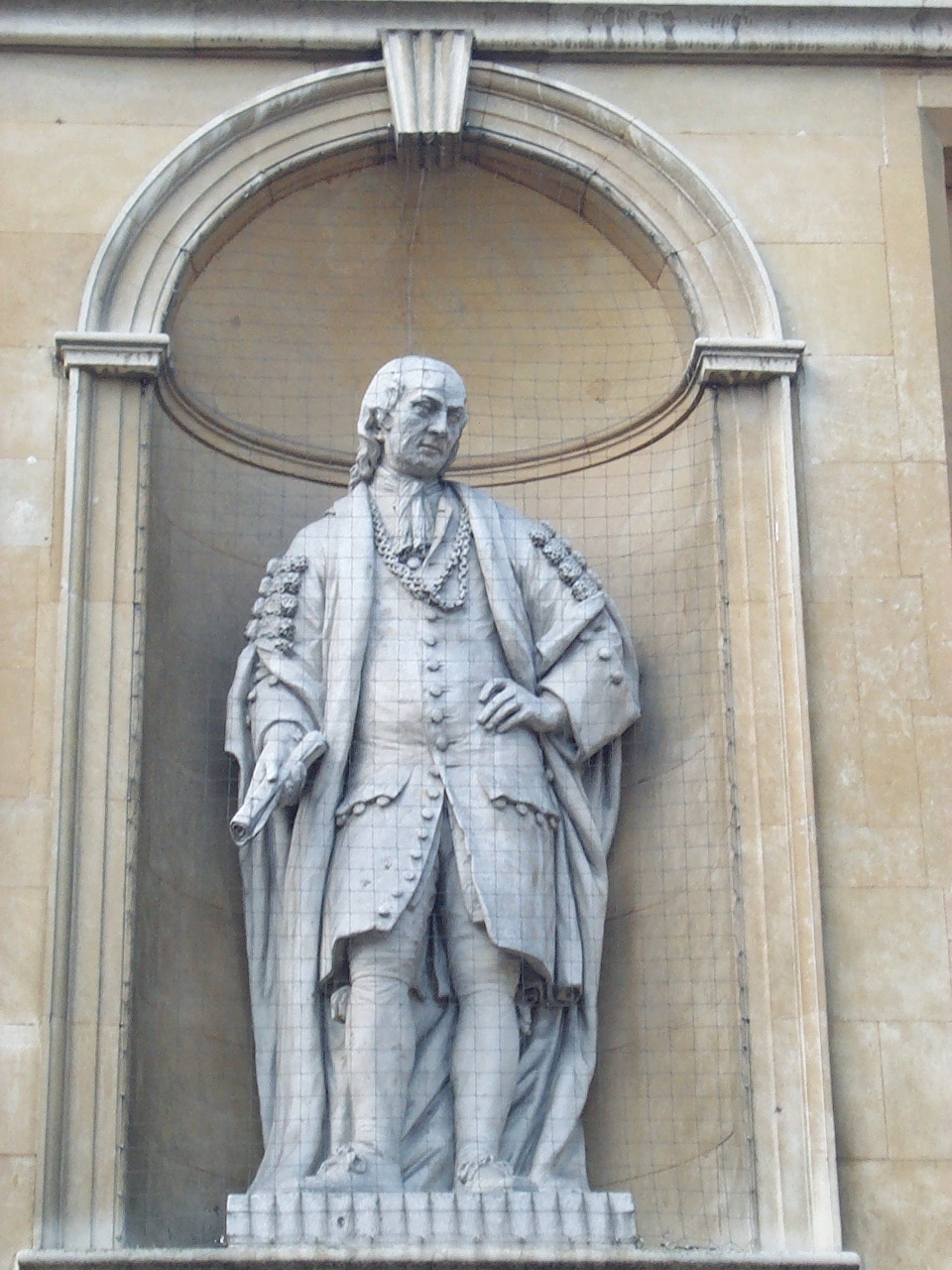
Statue of Sir William Harpur on the face of the building

The earliest parts of the building, which was constructed as the home of Bedford Grammar School, date from around 1550. The school was established in accordance with letters patent issued by King Edward VI in August 1552 and it was endowed by the local merchant and Lord Mayor of London, Sir William Harpur, in 1566. It demerged into two parts, Bedford School and the Writing School, with both parts remaining at St Paul's Square, in 1764.

The building was refaced to the designs of Isaac Clayson in the Neoclassical style in 1767. The design involved a symmetrical main frontage with five bays facing onto the St Paul's Square; the central bay featured a doorway with a pediment and a statue of Sir William Harpur in a niche above with a large pediment at roof level. The Writing School then moved to new premises designed by Edward Blore in Harpur Square in 1834. The building at St Paul's Square was extended to the north to the designs of James Horsford in 1861: the extension created a large assembly hall for Bedford School and featured a prominent lantern at roof level. Bedford School moved to buildings constructed on land to the north of St Peter's Green in October 1891.

The vacant building in St Paul's Square then became the local town hall in 1892 and a council chamber and a mayor's parlour were subsequently established in the building. King George V and Queen Mary visited the town hall for a civic lunch on 27 June 1918 during the First World War.

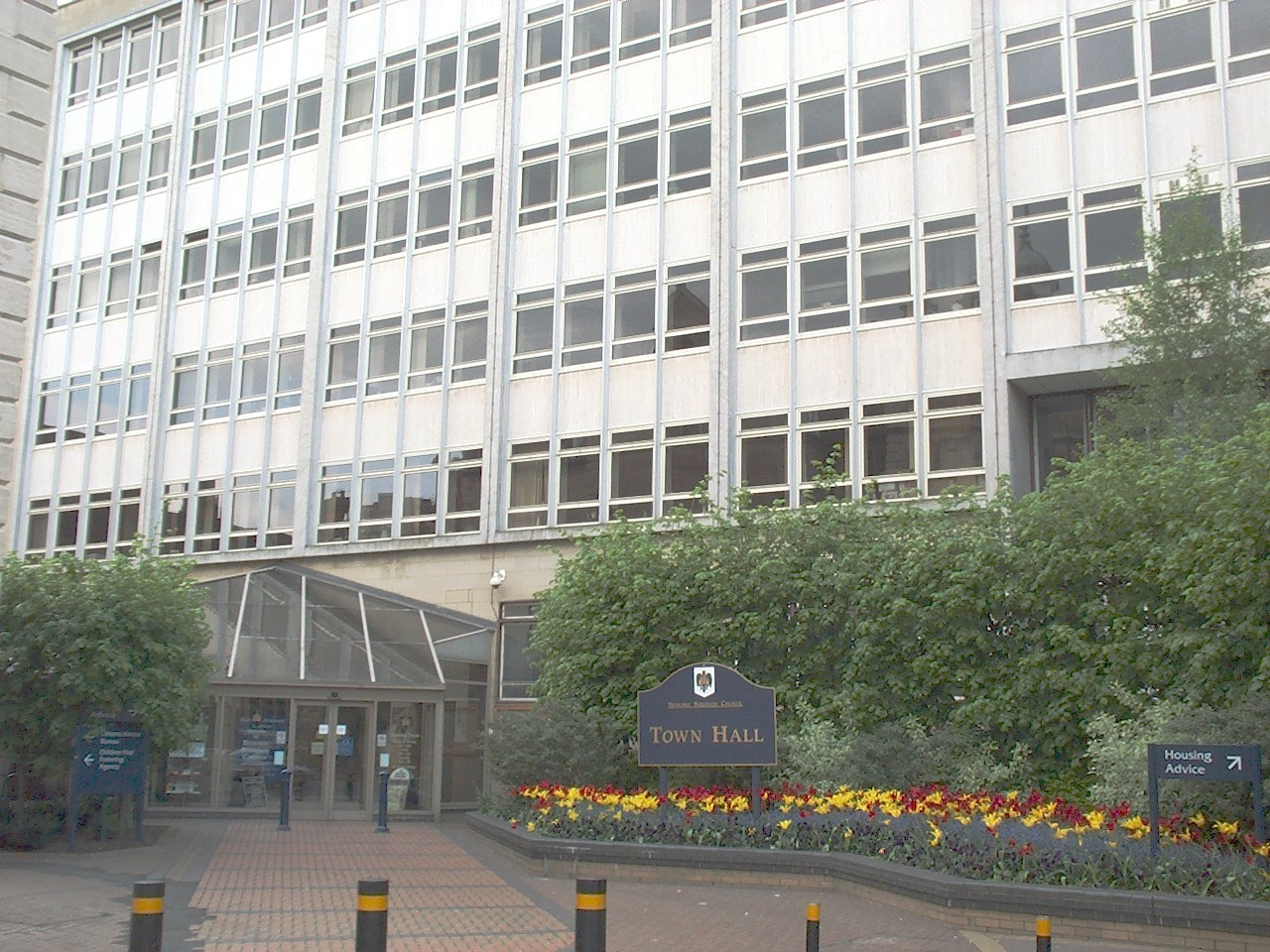
1962 office block wing, demolished 2014.

In 1962 council officers and their departments moved to a modern seven-storey structure, located just behind the town hall, which became known as the Town Hall Office Block.

The town hall complex continued to serve as the headquarters of Bedford Municipal Borough Council and remained the local seat of government when the enlarged Bedford District Council was formed in 1974. Bedford District Council was given borough status as Bedford Borough Council in 1992, and after Bedfordshire County Council was abolished in April 2009, Bedford Borough Council, as the new unitary authority, moved to the old County Hall (now known as the "Borough Hall") in Cauldwell Street.

Both the old town hall and the Town Hall Office Block then became surplus to requirements: the old town hall served initially as the local tourist information centre until 2015 and then as the local registry office from April 2016. Meanwhile, the council decided to demolish the Town Hall Office Block: it was badly damaged in a fire in February 2014 during the early stages of its demolition to make way for the Riverside Development.

Works of art in the old town hall include a painting by Andrew Carrick Gow depicting the Marquess of Montrose at the Battle of Kilsyth in August 1645 and a painting by George Harvey depicting John Bunyan imagining the Pilgrim's Progress while imprisoned in Bedford Gaol.
