= Challenger Society for Marine Science =

UK interdisciplinary learned society

The logo of the Challenger Society for Marine Science.

The Challenger Society for Marine Science (or Challenger Society) is a learned society established in 1903 in the United Kingdom around the interdisciplinary subject of marine science. The central objectives of the Challenger Society are:

- To advance the study of marine science through research and education;
- To disseminate knowledge of marine science with a view to encouraging a wider interest in the study of the world's oceans and an awareness of the need for their proper management;
- To contribute to public debate on the development of marine science.

== History ==
The Challenger Society was founded in 1903 by two British scientists, the zoologist George Herbert Fowler and the physician Richard Norris Wolfenden. The Society was named in honour of HMS Challenger, which undertook the first global marine research survey, the Challenger expedition, between 1872 and 1876. When it was founded, the Society had 25 members who met four times annually in the Royal Society rooms of Burlington House in London.

The Challenger Society has a current membership of several hundred scientists and students. The Society publishes the journal Ocean Challenge three times a year, together with a monthly newsletter, Challenge Wave. Every two years since 1984, the Society holds a four-day conference, the Challenger Conference for Marine Science (formerly known as UK Oceanography). This conference typically attracts around 300 delegates and its location is rotated around the key marine-based research centres and universities within the UK. The most recent conference in September 2015 was hosted at Sheffield University.
