= George Godber =

English physician and Chief Medical Officer

- Born: George Edward Godber; 4 August 1908; Willington, Bedfordshire
- Died: 7 February 2009 (aged 100); Milton Keynes
- Occupation: General practitioner

Sir George Edward Godber GCB (4 August 1908 – 7 February 2009) was an English General practitioner, who served as Chief Medical Officer for the Government of the United Kingdom from 1960 to 1973. He was also part of the team that planned the National Health Service (NHS) and, as Deputy Chief Medical Officer and subsequently Chief Medical Officer, campaigned against smoking and for immunization against polio and diphtheria. He was chair of the committee that published the three Cogwheel Reports on the organisation of work in hospitals.

== Early life and education ==
Godber was born on 4 August 1908, the son of Bessie Maud (née Chapman) and Isaac Godber, a nurseryman in Willington, Bedfordshire; he was the third of seven children, 5 boys and 2 girls. When he was eleven, he lost sight in one eye due to an accident.

Godber was educated at Bedford Modern School between 1917 and 1920, at Bedford School between 1920 and 1927, and at New College, Oxford, where he read medicine, gained a rowing blue and took part in two losing boat races. He was partly inspired to pursue public health by his Warden, the historian H. A. L. Fisher, who had been David Lloyd George's Education Secretary.

Another mentor was a young New College don, Richard Crossman, who was later to become Godber's Secretary of State for Health and Social Security. He did his clinical training at The London Hospital and qualified in 1933.

== Career ==
After completing his clinical training, Godber was employed in a variety of junior posts that gave him an insight into the state of the nation's health. At a casualty ward in a municipal hospital in London's Docklands, he found that many of his patients were people with serious diseases who were too poor to go to their GP and too proud to ask for a free service, convincing him that a state-funded health service based on need was required.

Limited by the lack of medical specialties afforded to him with the loss of his eye and due to his aversion to taking fees from patients, he decided to specialise in public health medicine and attended the London School of Hygiene and Tropical Medicine, earning a diploma in public health in 1936.

In 1937, Godber became a county medical officer in Surrey, where he worked on communicable diseases. In 1939, he joined the Ministry of Health as a medical officer. During World War II, he worked in Birmingham administering the wartime Emergency Medical Services.

Godber served as Deputy Chief Medical Officer from 1950 to 1960. He was instrumental in persuading the Royal College of Physicians to form a committee on smoking and lung cancer in 1958. Their report Smoking and Health, published in 1962, was influential in bringing the link to the attention of the public.

Godber was awarded an honorary doctorate of science from the University of Bath in 1979. He was appointed CB in 1958, KCB in 1962 and GCB in 1971. He died on 7 February 2009, aged 100.

== Family ==
A number of Godber's siblings distinguished themselves in later life:

- W. T. Godber, adviser to the British Government on agricultural matters, President of the East of England Agricultural Society, Chairman of the Bedfordshire Agricultural Executive Committee and the Farmers' Club;
- Joseph Godber, British Conservative party politician and cabinet minister;
- Joyce Godber, historian of Bedfordshire and author;
- Rowland John Godber, owner of a rubber plantation in Malaya and later a prisoner of war. The diary of his experiences as a prisoner of war are extant and held by the Imperial War Museum; and
- Geoffrey Chapman Godber, CBE DL, Chief executive of West Sussex County Council.

== Personal life ==
Godber did not drink alcohol or smoke. He continued to drive until the age of 97.
