= Luton Crown Court =

Judicial building in Luton, England

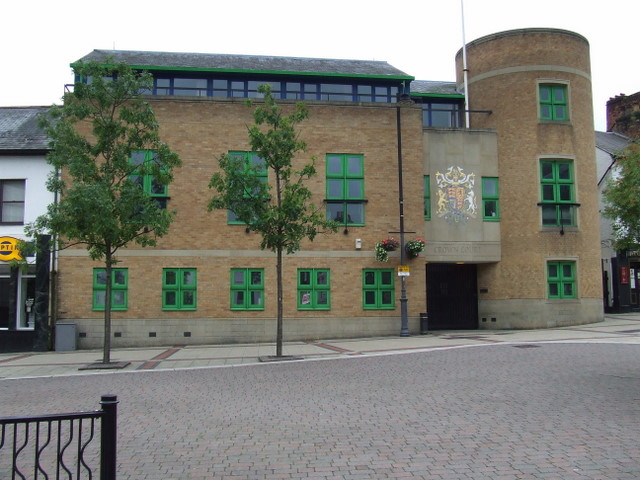
- Luton Crown Court

- Shown in Bedfordshire
- 51.8779°N 0.4144°W
- Location: George Street, Luton

History
- Built: 1991

Site notes
- Architect: Property Services Agency
- Architectural style: Modernist style

Luton Crown Court is a Crown Court venue, which deals with criminal cases, in George Street, Luton, England.

== History ==
For much of the 20th century, the main venue for serious criminal court hearings in Bedfordshire was the Shire Hall in Bedford. However, as the number of court cases in Luton grew, it became necessary to commission a new criminal courthouse in Luton itself. The site selected by the Lord Chancellor's Department was on "Market Hill", and had been occupied by two shops: No. 7 George Street had been occupied by a betting shop, and No. 9 George Street had been occupied by a wine shop.

The new building was designed by the Property Services Agency in the Modernist style, built in buff brick at a cost of £10 million, and was completed in 1991. It was officially opened in April 1992. The design involved an asymmetrical main frontage facing onto George Street. The left hand section was fenestrated by five casement windows on the ground floor, by three casement windows on the first floor and by a continuous row of windows at attic level. The central bay featured a recessed opening containing a doorway at ground level, a wall faced in stone and bearing a Royal coat of arms on the first floor and a row of windows at attic level. The right hand section was formed by a three-storey circular tower with casement windows on each floor and a flat roof. Internally, the building was laid out to accommodate eight courtrooms.

Notable cases have included the trial and conviction of Charles Bronson, in February 2000, for criminal damage and assault, and the trial and conviction of the boxer, Lukasz Stachura, for the murder of Kamil Leszczynski.
