= W. T. Godber =

William Thomas Godber CBE
- Born: 5 June 1904; Kempston, Bedfordshire
- Died: 18 April 1981 (aged 76); Bedfordshire
- Education: Bedford Modern School

William Thomas Godber CBE (5 June 1904 – 18 April 1981) was an English authority on agriculture and agricultural engineering, an adviser to the British Government on agricultural matters, former president of the East of England Agricultural Society, former chairman of the Bedfordshire Agricultural Executive Committee and the Farmers' Club.

== Early life ==
Godber was born on 5 June 1904 in Kempston, Bedfordshire. He was the son of Isaac Godber, a nurseryman and florist originally from Nottinghamshire, and Bessie Maud Godber, originally from Hertfordshire. He was the eldest of seven children all of whom were born in Bedfordshire and would distinguish themselves in later life. By 1911 the family had moved from Kempston to Willington in Bedfordshire and William Godber was educated at Bedford Modern School.

== Career ==
In partnership with his father and trading as I. Godber & Son, Godber initially ran a farm in Harrold, Bedfordshire. The partnership was dissolved in 1935 after which Godber continued to carry on the business but trading in his own name.

Godber became an authority on agricultural engineering and sat on many important boards connected with husbandry. He was an adviser to the British Government on agricultural issues, was a board member of the British Society for Research in Agricultural Engineering and, in 1969, was elected Chairman of the Bedfordshire Agricultural Executive Committee.

Godber was elected Chairman of the Farmers' Club in 1971 and President of the East of England Agricultural Society in 1975 before being succeeded by John Scott, 9th Duke of Buccleuch. Godber was also Chairman of the Shuttleworth College, Bedfordshire and, in 1974, was made an Honorary Member of the Royal Agricultural Society of England in recognition of his services in promoting the objects for which the Society was established.

Godber was appointed CBE in 1967.

== Family life ==
A number of Godber's siblings distinguished themselves in later life:

- Baron Godber of Willington, British Conservative party politician and cabinet minister;
- Sir George Godber GCB, Chief Medical Officer of the United Kingdom;
- Joyce Godber, historian of Bedfordshire and author;
- Rowland John Godber, owner of a rubber plantation in Malaya and later a prisoner of war. The diary of his experiences as a prisoner of war are extant and held by the Imperial War Museum; and
- Geoffrey Chapman Godber, CBE DL, Chief executive of West Sussex County Council.

Godber was married to Dorothy and had 2 daughters, Gillian and Susan. He died in Bedfordshire on 18 April 1981.
