= Tom Lewis (physician) =

English obstetrician-gynecologist

Thomas Loftus Townshend Lewis CBE (27 May 1918 – 9 April 2004) was an internationally renowned English obstetrician / gynecologist who served on the council of the Royal College of Obstetricians and Gynaecologists as secretary (1961–1968) and later as senior vice president (1975–1978). He was the author of three books on obstetrics/ gynecology, one of which is considered a classic text on the topic: Progress in Clinical Obstetrics and Gynaecology. Lewis was appointed as a Commander of the Order of the British Empire in 1979.

Lewis was born in Hampstead, North London. Raised by his paternal grandparents in Cape Town, South Africa, until the age of 15, he then went to London to live with his father Neville Lewis. His grandfather had been mayor of Cape Town. He studied medicine at Jesus College, Cambridge, before enlisting as a doctor in the South African Air Force in 1943, and married Alexandra "Bunty" Moore in 1946. In 1948 he was appointed consultant at Guy's Hospital in London, and was consultant for Queen Charlotte's Maternity Hospital and Chelsea Hospital for Women from 1950 until his retirement in 1983.

Lewis was an avid athlete, and was selected to play for the England national rugby union team, although illness prevented him from representing his country.

Lewis died at his home in Wimbledon, London, aged 85.
