= Richard Norris Wolfenden =

English oceanographer

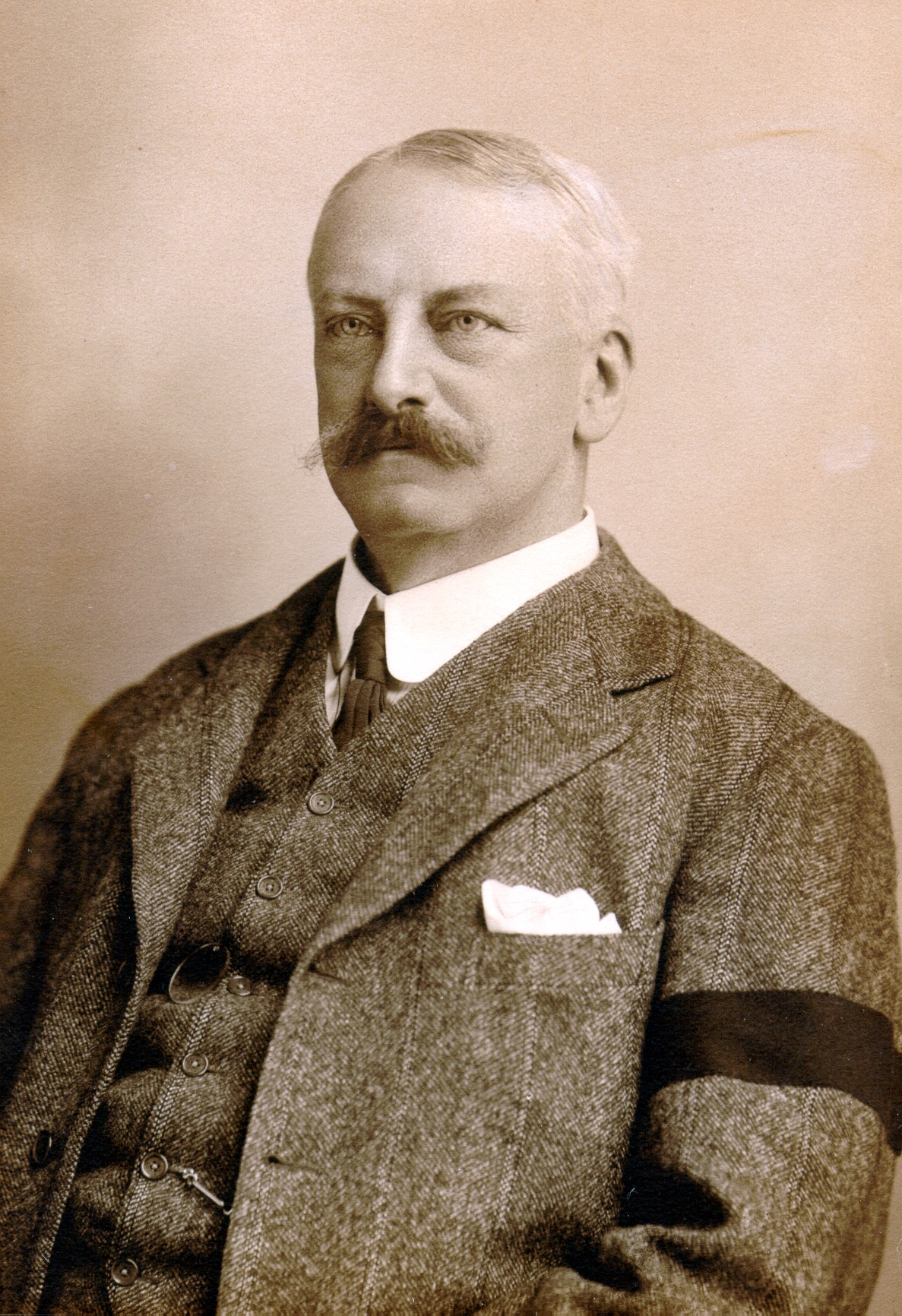
- Portrait from c. 1905
- Born: 1854
- Died: 1926 (aged 71–72)
- Education: Christ's College, Cambridge;
- Occupation: Physician

Richard Norris Wolfenden (1854–1926) was an English physician and oceanographer.

== Life ==
Wolfenden was educated at Christ's College, Cambridge. He practised as a London physician, and lectured in physiology at the Charing Cross Hospital medical school. He was House Physician at the London Hospital and Senior Physician at the Throat Hospital, Golden Square, London. He founded and edited the Journal of Laryngology and Rhinology.

As well as his medical practice, Wolfenden also interested himself in oceanography. Together with George Herbert Fowler, Wolfenden founded the Challenger Society for Marine Science in 1903.

== Works ==
- 1884 – Histological notes for the course of practical histologoy at Charing Cross Hospital Medical School (pdf)
- 1886 – On infantile cerebral paralysis
- 1888 – Studies in pathological anatomy, especially in relation to laryngeal neoplasms
- 1902 – The plankton of the Faröe Channel and Shetlands. Preliminary Notes on some Radiolaria and Copepoda. Journal of the Marine Biological Association of the United Kingdom n. ser. 6: 344–372 (BHL)
- 1903 – Copepoda. In: Fowler, G.H.; Contribution to our knowledge of the plankton of the Faeroe Channel. No. VIII. Proceedings of the Zoological Society of London 1903(1): 122–126 (BHL)
- 1903 – On the Copepod Sub-family Aetidiinae, with a proposed Revision of the Classification. Report of the British Association for the Advancement of Science 72: 263–267 (BHL)
- 1904 – Notes on the Copepoda of the North Atlantic Sea and the Faröe Channel. Journal of the Marine Biological Association of the United Kingdom n. ser. 7: 110–146 (BHL)
- 1905 – Biscayan Plankton. Part VI. - The Colloid Radiolaria. Transactions of the Linnean Society of London. Zoology ser. 2, 10: 131–136 (BHL)
- 1905 – Plankton Studies: preliminary notes upon new or interesting species Part I. Copepoda: 1–24 (pdf)
- 1906 – Notes on the collection of Copepoda. In: Gardiner, J.S. (ed.). The Fauna and Geography of the Maldive and Laccadive Archipelagoes suppl. 1: 989–1040 (pdf)
- 1906 – Plankton Studies: preliminary notes upon new or interesting species. Part II. Copepoda: 25–44 (pdf)
- 1908 – Crustacea. VIII. Copepoda. British National Antarctic Expedition 1901–1904, Natural History, Zoology 4: 1–46 (BHL)
- 1909 – Scientific and biological researches in the North Atlantic: conducted by the author on his yachts 'The Walwin' and 'The Silver Belle'. Memoirs of the Challenger Society 1: 1–234 (BHL)
- 1911 – Die marinen Copepoden der Deutschen Südpolar Expedition 1901–1903. II. Die pelagischen Copepoden der Westwinddrift und des südlichen Eismeers mit Beschreibung mehrerer neuer Arten aus dem Atlantischen Ozean. Deutsche Südpolar-Expedition 1901–1903 12 (Zoologie 4) Heft 4: 181–380 (BHL)

== Sources ==
- J. Dundas-Grant, "In memoriam: R. Norris Wolfenden", Journal of laryngology and otology, 1926, pp. 833–834
- D.M. Damkaer, "R. Norris Wolfenden, M.D.: the medical episode", Journal of laryngology and otology, 1989, 103: 1005-1013
