= Borough Hall, Bedford =

County building in Bedford, Bedfordshire, England

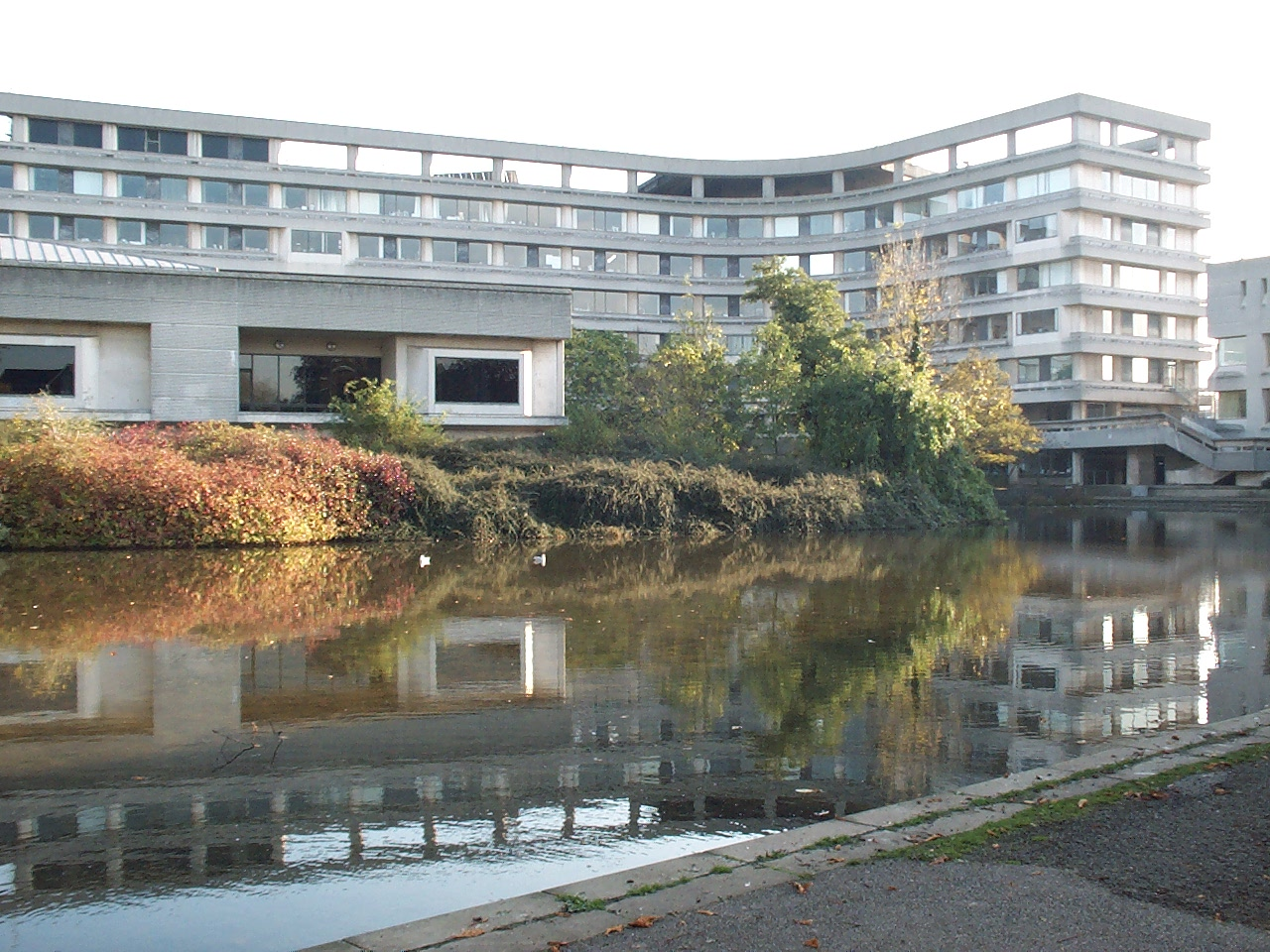
- Borough Hall

- Location within Bedfordshire

General information
- Architectural style: Brutalist style
- Location: Bedford, Bedfordshire, United Kingdom
- Coordinates: 52.1325°N 0.4701°W
- Completed: 1969

Design and construction
- Architect: Douglas Chalk

Borough Hall, formerly County Hall, is a municipal building in Cauldwell Street, Bedford, Bedfordshire, England. It is the headquarters of Bedford Borough Council.

== History ==
For much of the 20th century the Shire Hall in Bedford was the local facility for dispensing justice and the meeting place of Bedfordshire County Council. After deciding the old shire hall was inadequate for their needs, county leaders chose to procure a new county headquarters: the site selected on the south bank of the River Great Ouse had previously been used as a recreation ground.

Construction of the new building, which was undertaken by Arthur Sanders Limited of Rushden, started in 1965. The new building was designed by the Deputy County Architect, Douglas Chalk, in the brutalist style and the design work was overseen by County Architect, John Barker. The design involved a reinforced concrete-framed structure with an asymmetrical main frontage facing Cauldwell Street which curved round on the left side down to the river; there was a canopied main entrance on the ground floor and there were exposed concrete beams above and below a continuous band of glazing on each of the six floors. Construction challenges with the reinforced concrete meant that the building was not completed until November 1969. It was officially opened as "County Hall" by the Duchess of Kent on 12 October 1970. Internally, the principal rooms were the council chamber and the committee rooms.

Queen Elizabeth II, accompanied by the Duke of Edinburgh, visited County Hall, before departing to open new facilities at Bedford Modern School, on 11 May 1976. After Bedfordshire County Council was abolished in April 2009, the building became known as "Borough Hall" and formed the headquarters of Bedford Borough Council, which had been based at the Old Town Hall until 2009.
