= Bedfordshire County Council =

Former local authority in England

History
- Founded: 1 April 1889
- Disbanded: 31 March 2009
- Succeeded by: Bedford Borough Council; Central Bedfordshire Council

Meeting place
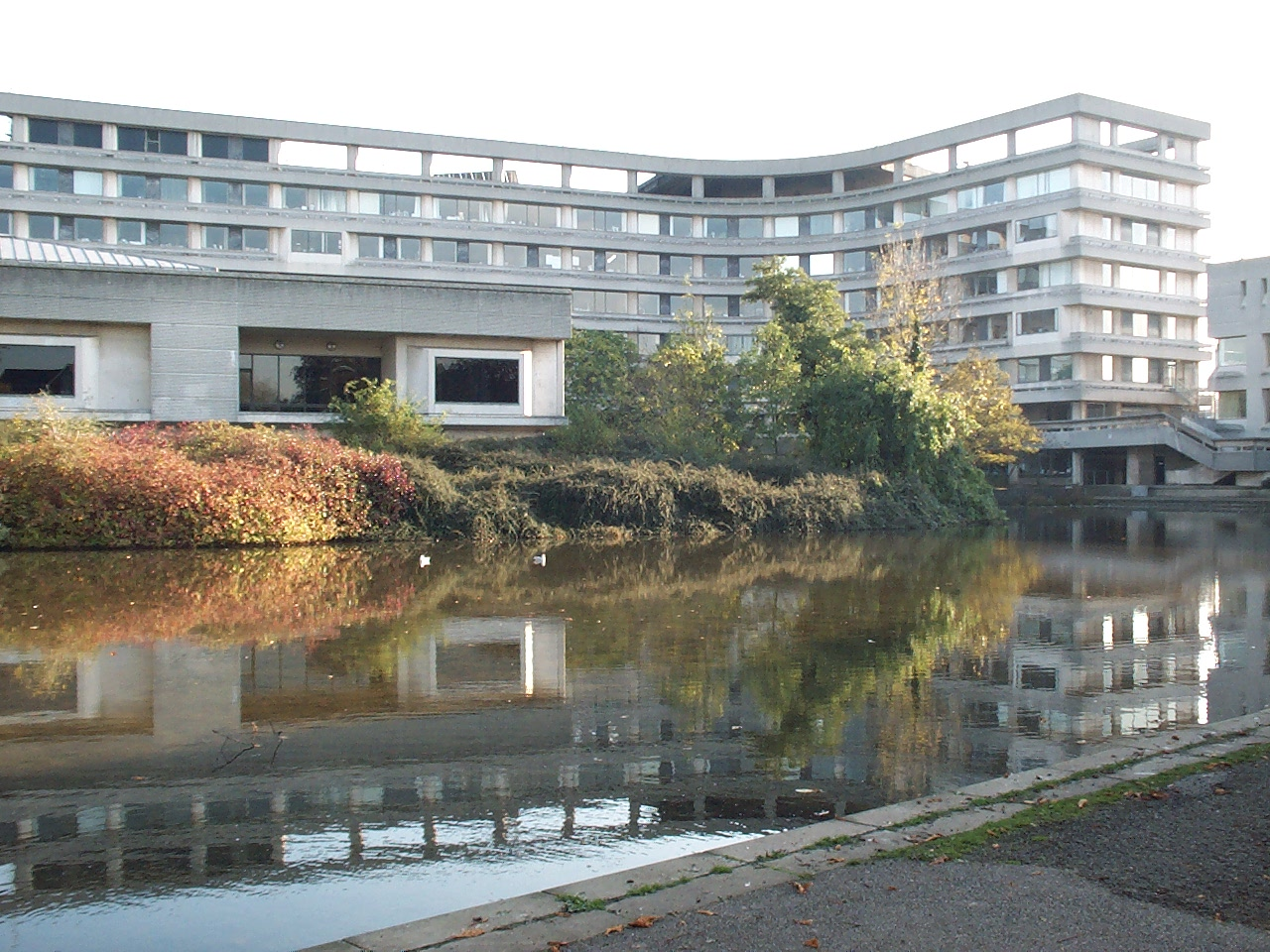
- County Hall, Bedford

Bedfordshire County Council was the county council of Bedfordshire in England. It was created in 1889 and abolished in 2009. Throughout its existence, the council was based in Bedford.

Luton was a county borough independent from the county council between 1964 and 1974; Luton Borough Council became independent from the county council again in 1997 when it was made a unitary authority. On the abolition of the county council in 2009, the pre-existing Bedford Borough Council also became a unitary authority, taking over the county council's functions within that borough. The rest of the county (the former Mid Bedfordshire and South Bedfordshire districts) was placed under a new unitary authority called Central Bedfordshire Council.

== History ==
Elected county councils were created in 1889 under the Local Government Act 1888, taking over many administrative functions that had previously been performed by unelected magistrates at the quarter sessions.

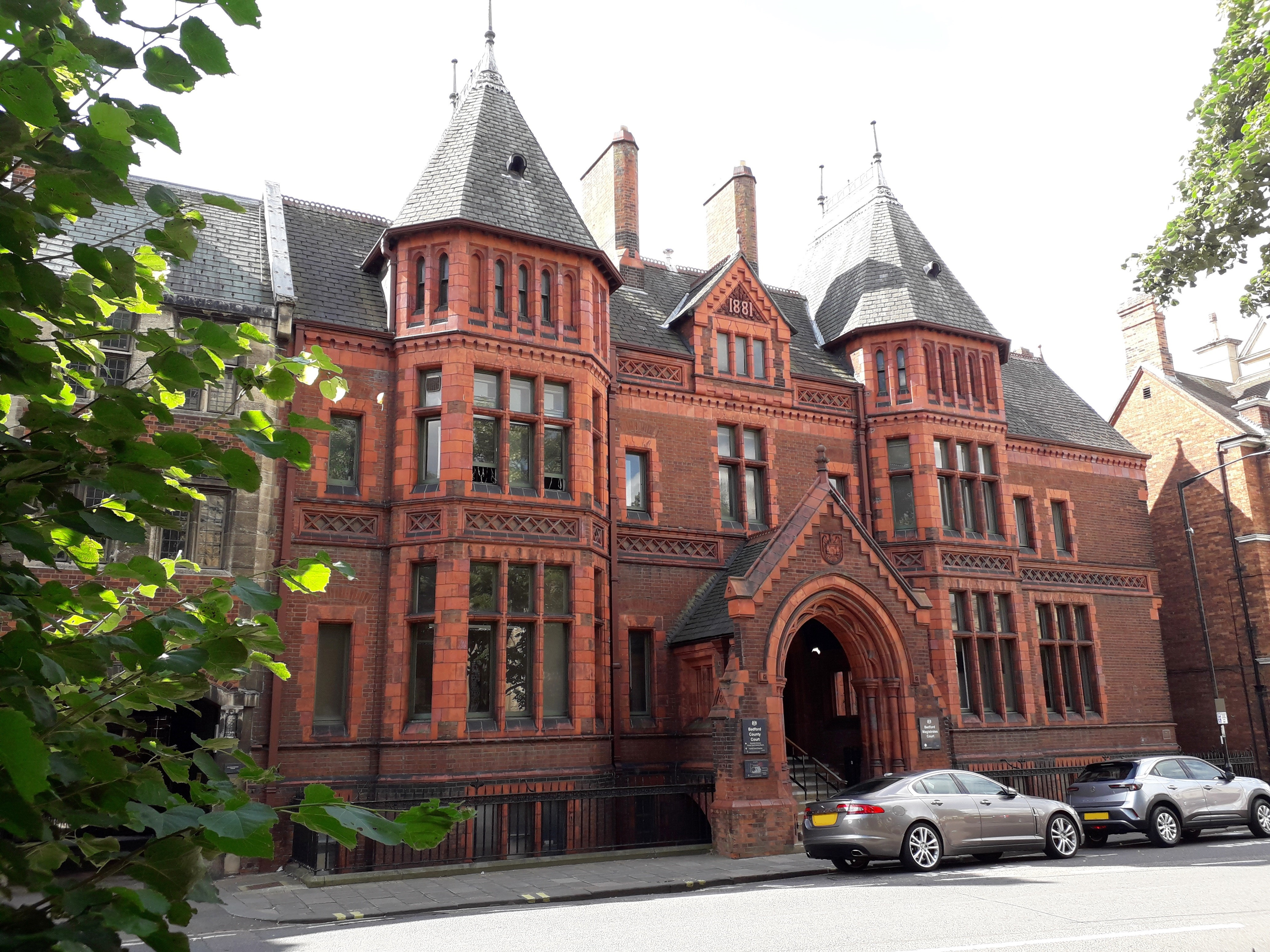
Shire Hall, Bedford: Council's meeting place 1889–1969

The first elections were held in January 1889. After some provisional meetings, the council formally came into being on 1 April 1889. On that day it held its first official meeting at Shire Hall, Bedford, the county's main courthouse, which had been completed in 1881 on the site of an earlier courthouse of 1753. Shire Hall had also served as the meeting place for the quarter sessions which preceded the county council. Charles Magniac, who had formerly been a Liberal Member of Parliament for Bedford, was the first chairman of the county council.

When first created, the council was responsible for 245 miles (394 km) of main roads outside towns, county bridges, and funding the Poor Law Unions, Bedfordshire Constabulary and the Three Counties Asylum. Its first annual budget was £30,000.

The council's powers and functions were gradually increased over time. The council took over the provision of education (except for in the boroughs of Bedford and Luton) under the Education Act 1902. The Smallholdings and Allotments Act 1908 gave the council the duty to provide allotments; by 1918 nearly 6,000 acres (2,400 ha) of allotments had been provided in the county. In 1913, the County Record Office was established by archivist George Herbert Fowler, which was the first county record office in England.

The first female councillor, Amy Walmley, was elected in 1922. In 1930, under the Local Government Act 1929, the council took over the relief of the poor from the abolished Poor Law Unions, and took on the maintenance of minor roads from the district councils. In 1947 the Bedfordshire Fire Brigade was created when responsibility for fire brigades passed to the county council.

In 1964, Luton was made a county borough, removing it from the administrative county (the area administered by the county council).

=== Non-metropolitan county ===
Comparison of districts within Bedfordshire, 1974-2009 (left), and from 2009 (right)
County council area Unitary

In 1974, Bedfordshire was redesignated as a non-metropolitan county under the Local Government Act 1972. Luton was brought back under the authority of the reformed county council, and the lower tier of local government was reorganised at the same time. Prior to 1974 the lower tier had comprised numerous boroughs, urban districts and rural districts; it was reorganised into four non-metropolitan districts: Bedford (called North Bedfordshire 1975–1992), Luton, Mid Bedfordshire and South Bedfordshire.

Luton was once more made independent from the county council in 1997, when Luton Borough Council was made a unitary authority.

In 2000, Bedfordshire County Council became a founding partner in the Forest of Marston Vale, a community forest aiming to restore land south-west of Bedford which had previously been used for brickmaking with a country park and new tree planting.

Between 2007 and 2009, proposals were considered for how to implement a unitary structure of local government across the county council's area. The three district councils put forward a proposal for the existing borough of Bedford to be one unitary authority and the Mid Bedfordshire and South Bedfordshire districts to merge into a new Central Bedfordshire unitary authority. Bedfordshire County Council proposed instead that there should be one Bedfordshire unitary authority covering the same area then served by the county council. The government supported the district councils' proposal. The county council pursued a judicial review of the government's decision, but was unsuccessful. The county council's last day was 31 March 2009, with the unitary authorities coming into force on 1 April 2009.

== Political control ==
Political control of the county council from the reforms of 1974 until its abolition in 2009 was as follows:

Party in control	Years
No overall control	1974–1977
Conservative	1977–1981
No overall control	1981-1997
Conservative	1997-2009

=== Leadership ===
The leaders of the council from 2002 until the council's abolition in 2009 were:

Councillor	Party	From	To
Philip Hendry	Conservative		16 Sep 2002
Angela Roberts	Conservative	12 Dec 2002	2005
Madeline Russell	Conservative	2005	31 Mar 2009

== Premises ==
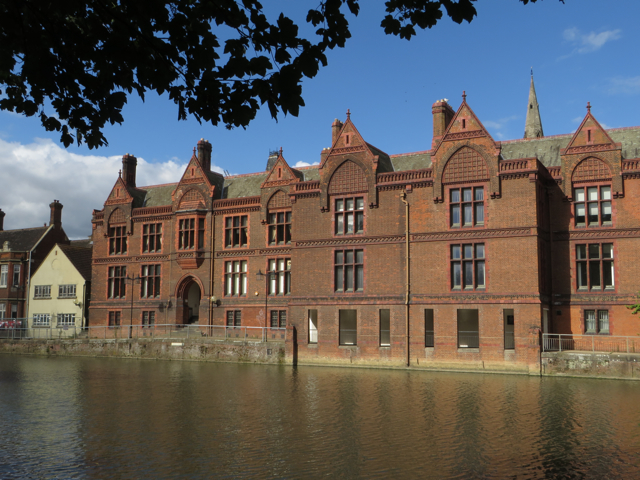
Shire Hall's south elevation facing the River Great Ouse

From 1889 until 1969 the council was based at Shire Hall on St Paul's Square in the centre of Bedford, on the north bank of the River Great Ouse. It had been built as the county's main courthouse between 1878 and 1881, and continued to serve as a courthouse as well as being the county council's meeting place. The building was subsequently extended several times to provide office accommodation for the county council's staff; a large extension to the east in 1910 also included a new council chamber.

By the 1960s the council had outgrown the Shire Hall, having numerous overflow offices around the town. It decided to build a new County Hall, choosing a site on Cauldwell Street on the south bank of the River Great Ouse, opposite the Shire Hall, in Bedford. The new building was designed by the deputy county architect, Douglas Chalk, under the supervision of the county architect, John Barker. The council moved into the new building in November 1969. It was officially opened by Katharine, Duchess of Kent in October 1970.

== Coat of arms ==
Bedfordshire County Council was granted a coat of arms in 1951 as part of the Festival of Britain celebrations. The coat of arms became the symbol of the county being placed on many public buildings and signs. The council used the banner of arms as a flag until it was abolished in 2009.

=== Official blazon ===
Arms : Quarterly Or and Gules a Fess wavy barry way of four Argent and Azure surmounted by a Pale Sable charged with three Escallops of the third.

Crest : On a Wreath of the Colours issuant from a Wreath of Oak Or a Swan's Head and Neck proper.

Supporters : On the dexter side a Lion Gules and on the sinister side a Bull Or.

Motto: 'CONSTANT BE'

=== Origin/meaning ===
The arms were officially granted on 12 April 1951.

The division of the field quarterly or and gules is derived from the arms of the Beauchamps, Constables of Bedford Castle, the leading family in the county after the Norman Conquest. The Beauchamp of 1215 was one of the promoters of Magna Carta, and their last male was killed at Evesham in 1265.

The wavy bar denotes the river Ouse. The pale charged with three escallops commemorates the services of the House of Russell to the State, the County and the County Council, and is taken from the arms of that family.

The crest is a swan's head and neck and again refers to the Ouse.

The lion supporter is taken from a similar supporter to the Russell coat of arms. The bull supporter stands for the importance of agriculture in the county.

The motto "Constant be" is taken from a hymn by 17th century writer and preacher John Bunyan, who was from Elstow, near Bedford. |"Who would true valour see, let him come hither, |One here will constant be, come wind, come weather"
