= Butterworth Report =

1972 report on social work in the UK

The Butterworth Report (1972) or the Report of the Butterworth Inquiry Into the Work and Pay of Probation Officers and Social Workers was a report published by a committee headed by Jack Butterworth, Baron Butterworth and commissioned by the Department for Employment to study the work and pay of social workers in England, Scotland and Wales. It advocated for local setting of priorities to prevent services from becoming overwhelmed by demand. It also noted that there were discrepancies in pay and prospects for those working in the National Health Service compared with those employed by local authorities.

== See also ==
- Seebohm Report
- Mayston Report
- Salmon Report
