= John Richardson, Baron Richardson =

The Right Honourable The Lord Richardson LVO FRCP

Member of the House of Lords
- Lord Temporal
- Life peerage 2 February 1979 – 15 August 2004

Personal details
- Born: 16 June 1910
- Died: 15 August 2004 (aged 94)

Coat of arms of John Richardson, Baron Richardson
Crest The head of a rhinoceros erased Sable behind the horn a scroll inscribed with the words "Till Time Ceases" in letters Gules. Escutcheon Sable on a fess engrailed Or between in chief an open book Proper bound Gules edged Gold between two mullets and in base a swan Argent a lion passant guardant also Gules. Supporters Two horses reguardant the dexter a Grey with Saddlecloth of the Metropolitan Police Force the sinister also a Grey with Saddlecloth of the Royal Army Medical Corps both saddled bridled with headstall horse-hair plume and breast girth all with Silver buckles and bosses Proper. Motto By Friendship And By Service

John Samuel Richardson, Baron Richardson, LVO FRCP (16 June 1910 – 15 August 2004) was a British physician, President of the General Medical Council, 1973–80.

Richardson was educated at Charterhouse School and Trinity College, Cambridge. He trained at, and later worked for St Thomas' Hospital. During his career he attended King George VI and later Harold Macmillan. He was particularly proud of his role as chairman of the Joint Consultants' Committee from 1967 to 1972. He represented the JCC on the so-called Cogwheel Working Party (First Report of the Joint Working Party on the Organisation of Medical Work in Hospitals, 1967).

He was President of the Royal Society of Medicine from 1969 to 1971.

Richardson was appointed a Member (fourth class) of the Royal Victorian Order (MVO) in 1943, which was reclassified as Lieutenant (LVO) on 31 December 1984. He was knighted in 1960, created a Baronet 'of Ecclesall in the West Riding of Yorkshire' on 20 November 1963. On 2 February 1979 Sir John was created a life peer taking the title Baron Richardson, of Lee in the County of Devon.

He married the artist Sybil Trist in 1933. They remained married until her death in 1991.

Baronetage of the United Kingdom
New creation	Baronet (of Eccleshall); 1963–2004	Extinct
