= Bedfordshire Historical Record Society =

Bedfordshire Historical Record Society logo

The Bedfordshire Historical Record Society is an historical society and text publication society for the county of Bedfordshire in England. It was established in 1912.

== Selected publications ==
- A Bedfordshire bibliography: with some comments and biographical notes by L. R. Conisbee and A. R. Threadgill (1962–1978). 1967 Supplement, Second Supplement, Third Supplement.

== See also ==
- Bedfordshire and Luton Archives and Records Service
