= East of England Agricultural Society =

UK agricultural organization

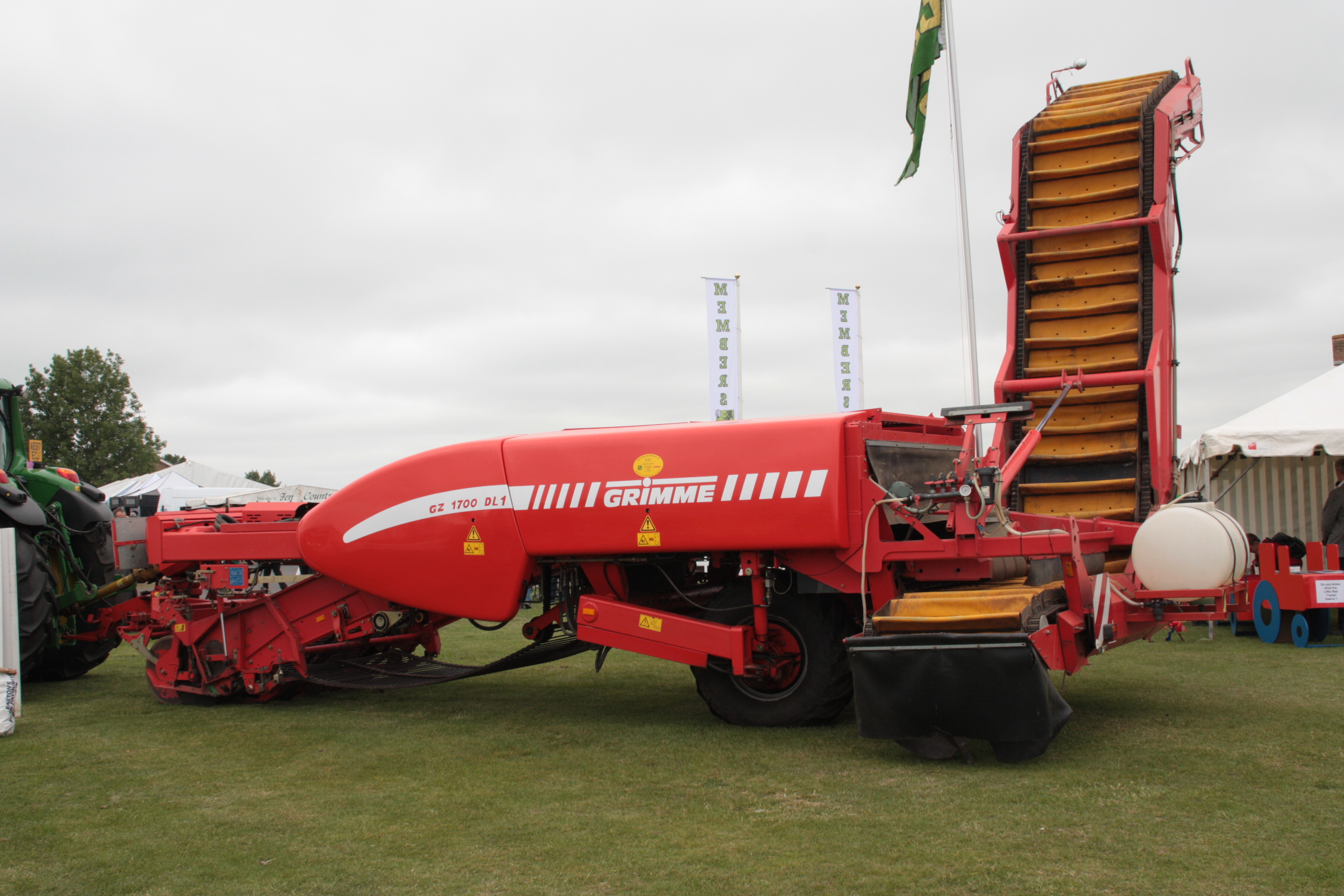
Grimme GZ 1700 DL 1 potato harvester on display at the East of England Show, 2010

The East of England Agricultural Society is an agricultural society in the east of England. The Society which is a registered charity owns the land known as the East of England Showground in Peterborough, England. The Society was responsible for running the East of England Show, which ran its final show in 2012 after 200 years. The Society now focuses on educational events for children.

== History ==
The Society was formed in 1970 by the merger of the Cambridgeshire and Isle of Ely (established 1863), Huntingdonshire (established 1837) and Peterborough (established 1797) agricultural societies. It was joined by the Bedfordshire Agricultural Society (1801) in 1971 and the Northamptonshire Agricultural Society (1848) in 1972. The Long Sutton Agricultural Society (1837) in neighbouring Lincolnshire remains independent and is affiliated for show purposes only.

The first president of the Peterborough Agricultural Society, the 4th Earl Fitzwilliam was elected in 1797. The annual subscription was one guinea and that amount remained until 1950.

The Society which is a registered charity owns the land known as the East of England Showground in Peterborough, England. Until 2012, it was the organiser of the East of England Show held each year at the 250 acre (101 ha) East of England Showground at Alwalton, five miles (8 km) west of the city of Peterborough in Cambridgeshire. The East of England Show, which at its height was attracted 100,000 people, was attended by only 10,000 people in 2012, which was half the projected number. Organisers said attendance had been dropping for twenty years. The Show made a loss of several hundred thousand pounds in 2012, leading to the closure of the event, despite a 200-year history. The Society replaced the event with educational activities aimed at children.
