= Mildred J. Berryman =

LGBTQ researcher in early 20th-century Utah

Mildred "Barrie" Berryman
- Berry, age 38, in 'The Mineralogist' magazine, July 1940
- Born: Mildred Jessie Berryman; September 22, 1901; Salt Lake City, Utah
- Died: November 7, 1972 (aged 71); Salt Lake City, Utah
- Resting place: Bountiful City Cemetery, Bountiful, Utah; 40°52′6.5366″N 111°53′18.0384″W
- Other name: Barrie or Berry
- Education: Westminster College
- Notable work: The Psychological Phenomena of the Homosexual
- Partner: Ruth Uckerman Dempsey
- Parents: Mildred Stokes; Richard Berryman

Mildred Jessie Berryman (September 22, 1901 – November 7, 1972), who went by "Barrie" (also rarely spelled "Berry"), was an early 20th century American pioneering researcher of lesbian and gay community in post-WWI Utah. She was also a photographer, a mineral merchant, and a manufacturing business co-owner with her girlfriend of over three decades.

== Early life ==
Berryman was born in Salt Lake City, Utah in 1901 as the third and last child born to parents Richard Berryman and Mildred Stokes. Her siblings were George (born 1896) and Richard Jr. (born 1898). Her father worked as a bartender in Salt Lake City from 1894 to the Prohibition Era of the 1920s, with 1913 on spent working at a bar called The Opera Bar which acted as an early gay bar attracting many homosexual clientele. After her first failed opposite-sex marriage she had her first lesbian relationship with her violin teacher Mae Anderson from 1920 to 1921. She joined the LDS church at the age of 19, received a patriarchal blessing at the age of 21, and later entered a relationship with a Mormon woman for over three decades, though she left involvement with the Mormon community to join the Bountiful Community Church.

== Career ==
At the age of 15, Berryman came out as lesbian at Westminster College (now University) where she attended their high school program. She announced that she wanted to do an academic study of lesbianism. The request was refused and some parents threatened to pull their daughters from the school, until she was expelled. Traumatized by the scandal and wanting to escape the shame of her homosexuality, she ran away at 16 and entered a short-lived marriage with a man. In 1928 (or 1929), Berryman began writing her thesis The Psychological Phenomena of the Homosexual on 23 lesbian women and 9 gay men, whom she met through a Salt Lake City bohemian club. Her research on lesbian and gay people from the perspective of a lesbian lay researcher was groundbreaking and she argued that homosexuality was inborn, benign, and evident among many animal species.

It is possible that she had begun her research around the time of WWI as a student at Westminster College in Salt Lake from 1916 to 1922. Her study has been called the first lesbian community study in the US, and she continued writing it until leaving it uncompleted by 1938 or 1939. By her request, parts of her research were posthumously published by her daughter- and son-in-law in 1977. It appears that Berryman did not complete or publish her work due to discouragement from her advisor as well as a desire to protect her privacy and that of her siblings. Additionally, at the time of research, the study's positive depiction of people engaging in same-sex sexual behavior may have been enough to have it banned under US federal Comstock laws since a book containing positively depicted minor lesbian themes was nearly banned in New York in 1929.

In the study, most lesbian women and gay men (many of whom had Mormon background) reported experiencing erotic interest in others of the same sex since childhood, and exhibited self-identity and community identity as sexual minorities. It was during the 1920s when gay and lesbian subcultures were beginning to become more established in several larger US cities. While most of the subjects feared discovery, a few were "out" about their homosexuality with their heterosexual friends. The social and legal risks of discovery were high since any consensual same-sex sexual behavior likely fell under the 1921 Utah sodomy law which banned "sodomy or any other detestable and abominable crime against nature" that was committed "with either the sexual organs or the mouth," or the 1907 Utah law which punished "every lewd or dissolute person" with up to 90 days in jail.

== Personal life ==
In 1924, Berryman fell in love with Edith Mary Chapman and lived in her house (that later became a boarding house for lesbians) until 1928. Around that time, Berryman became a photographer, and, in 1936, had a relationship with "Z". In the 40s, she collected and sold minerals specimens from her house and was involved in the Mineralogical Society of Utah and the Women's Benefit Association (W.B.A).

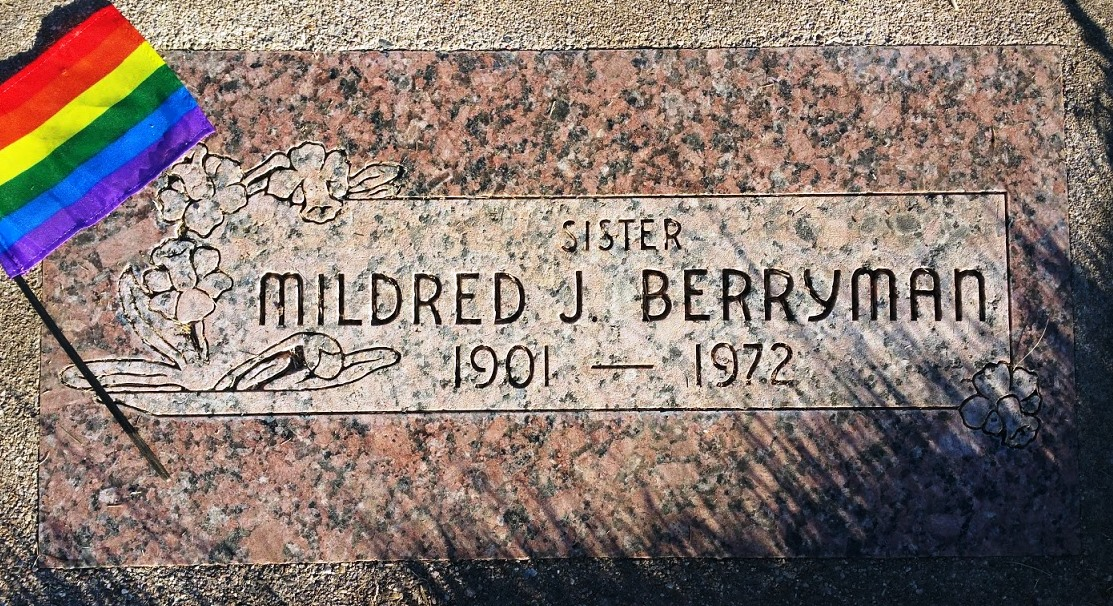
Grave marker for the resting place of Berryman

In 1934, she met a Mormon mother Ruth Uckerman Dempsey at their manufacturing job at Hill Air Force Base, with whom she later had a 33-year romantic relationship. Together, they ran a manufacturing business and participated in the Bonneview Garden Club until Berryman's death in 1972. Barry had also served as president of the Utah Business and Professional Women's Club. Her stepdaughter Bonnie Uckerman Bullough from Ruth's first marriage married Vern Bullough and they both became renowned sexologists writing on homosexuality.

== See also ==
- History of lesbianism in the United States
- Timeline of LGBTQ Mormon history
- Homosexuality and The Church of Jesus Christ of Latter-day Saints
- LGBTQ Mormon people and organizations
- Queer studies
