= Selina Bracebridge =

British artist, medical reformer, and travel writer

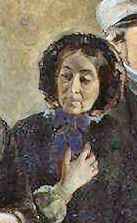
- Selina Bracebridge - detail from The Mission of Mercy: Florence Nightingale receiving the Wounded at Scutari, Jerry Barrett, 1857
- Born: Selina Mills c. 1800
- Died: 1874
- Spouse: Charles Bracebridge

Selina Bracebridge (née Mills; 1800 – 1874) was a British artist, medical reformer, and travel writer.

Selina Bracebridge studied art under the celebrated artist Samuel Prout, and travelled widely as part of her art education.

She married Charles Holte Bracebridge (1799–1872) in 1824, and lived in Athens for much of the 1830s.

She became close friends with Florence Nightingale in 1846, and the Bracebridges travelled with her to Rome from 1847 to 1848, and around Europe, Greece, and Egypt between 1849 and 1850.

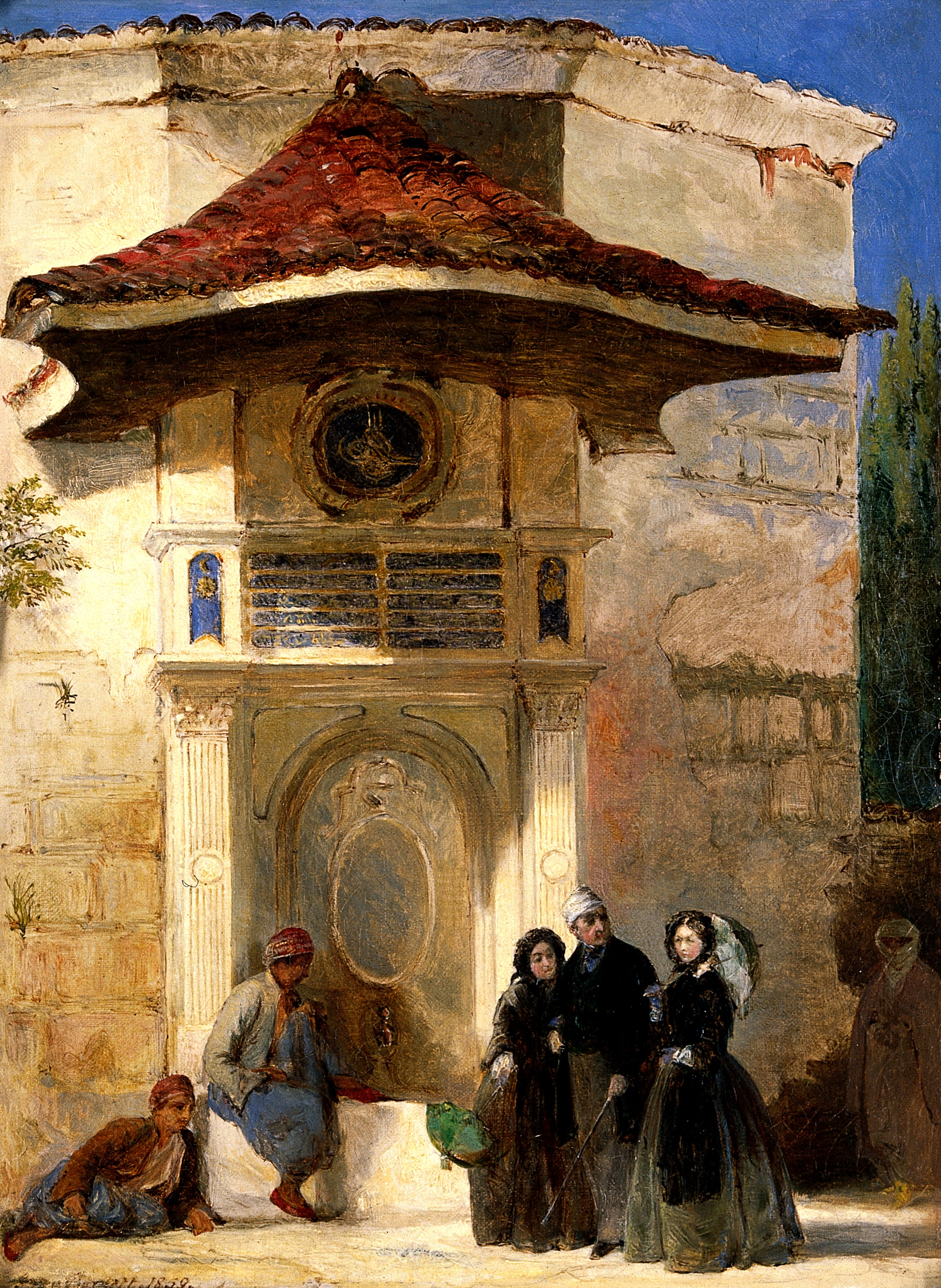
Florence Nightingale with Charles Holte Bracebridge and Selina Bracebridge in a Turkish street (1859)

The Bracebridges acted as administrative assistants to Nightingale for nine months at the Barrack Hospital during the Crimean War. When Nightingale fell dangerously ill at Balaclava in May 1855 they escorted her back to Scutari.

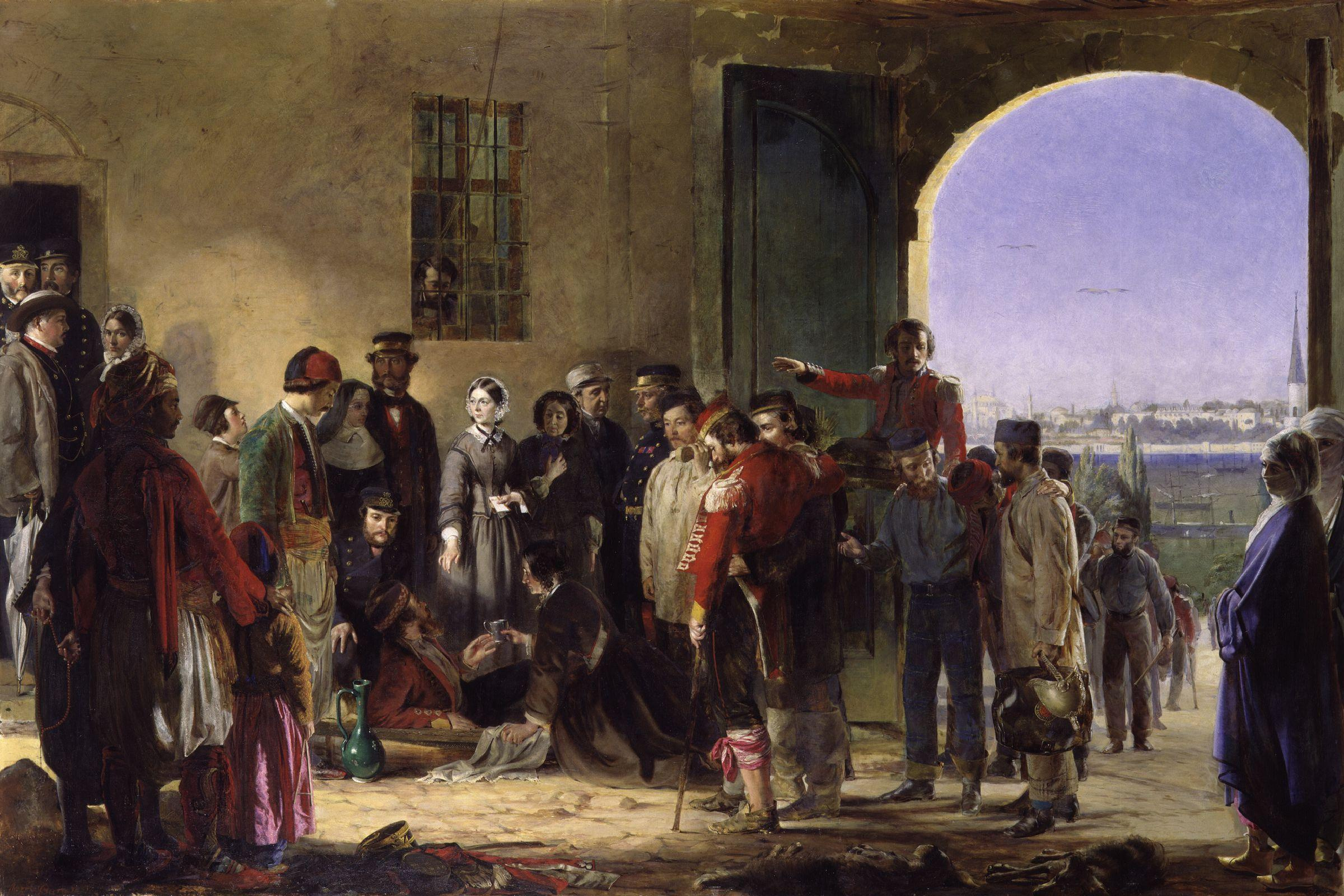
Jerry Barrett, The Mission of Mercy: Florence Nightingale receiving the Wounded at Scutari, 1857, oil on canvas, National Portrait Gallery, London.

She is one of the subjects in Jerry Barrett’s large 1857 painting The Mission of Mercy: Florence Nightingale receiving the Wounded at Scutari.

She and Nightingale remained close until her death in 1874, and Nightingale lamented her loss in a letter, saying ‘She was more than a mother to me’.

== Selected works ==
- A Fortified Town on a Hilltop (North side of the Acropolis, Athens), watercolour, c. 1825-1855
- Palestine, an album containing 5 maps, 2 architectural drawings, 36 landscape sketches and 4 etchings, c.1833
