= Commemorative coins of the United Kingdom =

Commemorative coins have been issued by the Royal Mint in the United Kingdom since 1935. Initially they only came out to mark events of great interest, but since the turn of the millennium have been minted yearly.

Until decimalisation crowns (five shilling coins) were used for this purpose as they were the highest denomination of the time, but due to inflation this role has been transferred to higher value coins.

Crowns, £5 coins and (until 1996) £2 coins are non-circulating, although they are still legal tender. These denominations are only used for commemoratives. During the decimal era, crowns were converted to twenty-five pence.

50p and £2 coins made after 1996 circulate normally and can be found in change. Usually about 5 million of each of these are the commemorative issue, the rest being of the standard design.

Since 1982 all of these have also been produced as sterling silver and 22 carat gold proofs.

Although the design of the old round £1 coin changed every year, these are not considered to be commemoratives, as they do not mark an event or its anniversary.

== Crowns ==
- 1935: Silver Jubilee of George V
- 1937: Coronation of George VI
- 1951: Festival of Britain
- 1953: Coronation of The Queen
- 1960: British Trade Fair in New York City
- 1965: Death of Winston Churchill, former Prime Minister

=== Twenty-five pence ===
- 1972: Silver Wedding of The Queen and The Duke of Edinburgh
- 1977: Silver Jubilee of Elizabeth II
- 1980: Queen Elizabeth The Queen Mother's 80th Birthday.
- 1981: Wedding of Charles, Prince of Wales and Lady Diana Spencer

== Five pounds ==
- 1990: Queen Elizabeth The Queen Mother's 90th Birthday
- 1993: 40th Anniversary of Coronation of The Queen
- 1996: The Queen's 70th Birthday
- 1997: Golden Wedding of The Queen and The Duke of Edinburgh
- 1998: The Prince of Wales' 50th Birthday
- 1999: Diana, Princess of Wales Memorial
- 1999/2000: Millennium
- 2000: Queen Elizabeth The Queen Mother's 100th Birthday
- 2001: Queen Victoria Centenary of death
- 2002: Golden Jubilee of Elizabeth II
- 2002: Queen Elizabeth The Queen Mother Memorial
- 2003: 50th Anniversary of Coronation of The Queen
- 2004: Entente Cordiale Centenary (Peace treaty between Britain and France)
- 2005: Bicentenary of Battle of Trafalgar and Admiral Lord Nelson (2 coins)
- 2006: 80th Birthday of The Queen
- 2007: Diamond Wedding of The Queen and The Duke of Edinburgh
- 2008: 60th Birthday of The Prince of Wales.
- 2008: 450th anniversary of the accession of Elizabeth I.
- 2009: The 500th anniversary of the accession of Henry VIII.
- 2009: Three years until the 2012 London Olympics, swimming
- 2010: 350th anniversary of the restoration of the monarchy under Charles II
- 2010: Two years until the 2012 London Olympic Games, athletics
- 2011: The 90th birthday of The Duke of Edinburgh
- 2011: Wedding of Prince William and Catherine Middleton
- 2011: One Year until the 2012 London Olympic and Paralympic games, cycling
- 2012: Diamond Jubilee of Queen Elizabeth II
- 2012: London 2012 Olympics
- 2012: London 2012 Paralympics
- 2013: 60th Anniversary of the Queen's Coronation
- 2013: The Royal Christening of HRH Prince George of Cambridge
- 2014: The 300th Anniversary of the Death of Queen Anne
- 2015: The 50th anniversary of the death of Sir Winston Churchill
- 2015: The 200th Anniversary of the Battle of Waterloo
- 2015: The Royal Birth of HRH Princess Charlotte of Cambridge
- 2015: Longest reigning monarch - Queen Elizabeth II
- 2016: 90th birthday of Queen Elizabeth II
- 2017: Sapphire Jubilee of Elizabeth II
- 2017: Remembrance Day
- 2017: Platinum Wedding (70 years) of Queen Elizabeth II and Prince Philip, The Duke of Edinburgh
- 2017: Prince Philip 70 years of service
- 2017: Centenary of the House of Windsor
- 2017: 1000th anniversary of the coronation of King Canute
- 2017: The Queen's Beasts series - Lion of England (Re-released with 2018 date to celebrate England's success in the World Cup)
- 2017: The Queen's Beasts series - Unicorn of Scotland
- 2017: Christmas
- 2018: Sapphire anniversary of the Queen's coronation
- 2018: Wedding of Prince Harry and Meghan Markle
- 2018: 250th anniversary of the founding of the Royal Academy of Arts
- 2018: Four generations of the Royal Family
- 2018: The Queen's Beasts series - Red Dragon of Wales
- 2018: The Queen's Beasts series - Black Bull of Clarence
- 2018: 5th birthday of Prince George of Cambridge
- 2020: 200th anniversary of the death of King George III
- 2021: Death of Prince Philip, Duke of Edinburgh
- 2022: Platinum Jubilee of Elizabeth II
- 2022: Death of Elizabeth II
- 2022: 100th anniversary of the Discovery of Tutankhamun's tomb
- 2023: Coronation of Charles III
- 2023: 75th birthday of King Charles III
- 2024: Buckingham Palace
- 2025: Coat of Arms of King Charles III
- 2026: 100th Anniversary of the Birth of Queen Elizabeth II
- 2026: 500 Years of the Crown

== Fifty pence ==
=== Circulating ===
- 1973: UK's entry into the European Economic Community
- 1992: UK's Presidency of the EU Council of Ministers and the completion of the European single market
- 1994: 50th anniversary of D-Day
- 1998: 25th anniversary of the UK's membership in the European Union
- 1998: 50th anniversary of the NHS
- 2000: 150th anniversary of the Public Libraries Act 1850
- 2003: 100th anniversary of the Women's Social and Political Union (the Suffragettes)
- 2004: 50th anniversary of the first four-minute mile by Roger Bannister
- 2005: 250th anniversary of the publication of Samuel Johnson's A Dictionary of the English Language
- 2006: 150th anniversary of the Victoria Cross (2 coins)
- 2007: 100th anniversary of the Scout Movement
- 2009: 250th anniversary of the Royal Botanical Gardens at Kew
- 2010: 100th anniversary of Girlguiding UK
- 2011: 50th anniversary of the World Wildlife Fund
- 2011: 2012 Summer Olympics and Paralympics in London (a set of 29 coins of different sports)
- 2013: 100th anniversary of the birth of Christopher Ironside
- 2013: 100th anniversary of the birth of Benjamin Britten
- 2014: XX Commonwealth Games in Glasgow
- 2015: 75th anniversary of the Battle of Britain
- 2016: 950th anniversary of the Battle of Hastings
- 2016: 150th anniversary of the birth of Beatrix Potter (1st series) - Beatrix Potter, Peter Rabbit, Mrs Tiggy-Winkle, Jemima Puddle-Duck, Squirrel Nutkin
- 2016: Team GB at the Rio Olympics
- 2017: Beatrix Potter (2nd series) - Benjamin Bunny, Mr. Jeremy Fisher, Tom Kitten, The Tale of Peter Rabbit
- 2017: Sir Isaac Newton
- 2018: Beatrix Potter (3rd series) - Peter Rabbit, Flopsy Bunny, Mrs. Tittlemouse, The Tailor of Gloucester
- 2018: 100th anniversary of the Representation of the People Act
- 2018: 60th anniversary of Paddington Bear (1st series) - at Paddington Station and at Buckingham Palace
- 2019: Sherlock Holmes
- 2019: Paddington Bear (2nd series) - at the Tower of London and at St Paul's Cathedral
- 2020: Britain's withdrawal from the European Union
- 2020: Celebrating British Diversity
- 2022: Platinum Jubilee of Elizabeth II
- 2022: 50th anniversary of Pride UK
- 2022: Death of Elizabeth II
- 2023: Coronation of Charles III

=== Non-circulating ===
- 2018: 40th anniversary of The Snowman (1st coin)
- 2019: Fifty Years of the Fifty Pence - British Culture set
- 2019: Fifty Years of the Fifty Pence - British Military Set
- 2019: 20th anniversary of The Gruffalo (2 coins) - The Gruffalo and The Gruffalo & Mouse
- 2019: Innovation in Science set (1st coin) - Stephen Hawking
- 2019: Beatrix Potter (4th series) - Peter Rabbit
- 2019: 30th anniversary of A Grand Day Out (Wallace and Gromit)
- 2019: The Snowman (2nd coin)
- 2020: The Dinosauria Collection (Tales of the Earth) - Megalosaurus, Iguanodon, Hylaeosaurus
- 2020: Beatrix Potter (5th series) - Peter Rabbit
- 2020: Innovation in Science set (2nd coin) - 100th anniversary of the birth of Rosalind Franklin
- 2020: Winnie The Pooh & Friends (1st series) - Winnie-the-Pooh, Christopher Robin, Piglet
- 2020: The Snowman (3rd coin)
- 2020-2021: Team GB at the Tokyo Olympics
- 2021: 50th anniversary of Decimal Day
- 2021: Innovation in Science set (3rd coin) - 75th anniversary of the death of John Logie Baird
- 2021: The Dinosauria Collection (The Mary Anning collection) - Temnodontosaurus, Plesiosaurus, Dimorphodon
- 2021: Winnie The Pooh & Friends (2nd series) - Winnie-the-Pooh, Owl, Tigger
- 2021: Innovation in Science set (4th coin) - 150th anniversary of the death of Charles Babbage
- 2021: Innovation in Science set (5th coin) - 100th anniversary of the discovery of Insulin
- 2021: The Snowman (4th coin)
- 2022: Platinum Jubilee of Elizabeth II (alternate obverse)
- 2022: 2022 Commonwealth Games (5 coins - 4 colourised, one each for England, Scotland, Wales and Northern Ireland)
- 2022: 50th anniversary of Pride UK (colourised reverse)
- 2022: Innovation in Science set (6th coin) - Alan Turing
- 2022: Winnie The Pooh & Friends (3rd series) - Eeyore, Kanga & Roo
- 2022: 100th anniversary of the BBC
- 2022: 10th anniversary of The Snowman and the Snowdog (5th coin)
- 2022 - 2023: 25th anniversary of Harry Potter (4 coins - 2022: Harry Potter, Hogwarts Express; 2023: Albus Dumbledore, Hogwarts)
- 2023: 75th anniversary of the Windrush Generation
- 2023: 75th anniversary of the NHS

2023 : Narnia

- 2023: 40th anniversary of Star Wars: Return of the Jedi
- 2024: Star Wars iconic vehicles

== Two pounds ==
=== Single metal ===
==== Non-circulating ====
- 1986: XIII Commonwealth Games in Edinburgh
- 1989: 300th anniversary of the Bill of Rights 1689
- 1989: 300th anniversary of the Claim of Right Act 1689
- 1994: 300th anniversary of Bank of England
- 1995: 50th anniversary of the end of the Second World War
- 1995: 50th anniversary of the United Nations
- 1996: UEFA Euro in England

=== Bimetallic ===
==== Circulating ====
- 1999: Rugby World Cup in Wales
- 2001: 100th anniversary of the first successful trans-Atlantic wireless transmission
- 2002: XVII Commonwealth Games in Manchester (4 coins) - England, Wales, Scotland and Northern Ireland
- 2003: 50th anniversary of the discovery of the structure of DNA
- 2004: 200th anniversary of the first steam locomotive
- 2005: 400th anniversary of the Gunpowder Plot
- 2005: 60th anniversary of the end of the Second World War
- 2006: 200th anniversary of the birth of Isambard Kingdom Brunel (2 coins) - Clifton Suspension Bridge and Paddington Station
- 2007: 200th anniversary of the Abolition of the Slave Trade
- 2007: 300th anniversary of the Acts of Union 1707
- 2008: 100th anniversary of the 1908 Summer Olympics in London
- 2008: The Beijing Olympics handover to London
- 2009: 200th anniversary of the birth of Charles Darwin
- 2009: 250th anniversary of the birth of Scottish poet Robert Burns
- 2010: 100th anniversary of the death of Florence Nightingale
- 2011: 400th anniversary of the King James Bible.
- 2011: 500th anniversary of the Mary Rose
- 2012: 200th anniversary of the birth of Charles Dickens
- 2012: The London Olympics handover to Rio
- 2013: The 150th anniversary of the London Underground (2 coins) - Roundel and Train
- 2013: The 350th anniversary of the first minting of the Golden guinea
- 2014: 100th anniversary of the Outbreak of the First World War
- 2014: 500th anniversary of Trinity House
- 2015: 800th anniversary of the Magna Carta
- 2015: The Royal Navy
- 2016: 400th anniversary of the death of William Shakespeare (3 coins) - Comedy, History, Tragedy
- 2016: The Army
- 2016: 350th anniversary of the Great Fire of London

==== Non-circulating ====
- 2017: First World War Aviation
- 2017: 200th anniversary of the death of Jane Austen
- 2018: 200th anniversary of Mary Shelley's Frankenstein; or, The Modern Prometheus
- 2018: 250th anniversary of Captain Cook's Voyage of Discovery (1st coin)
- 2018: 100th anniversary of the World War One Armistice
- 2018: 100th anniversary of the Royal Air Force (5 coins) - Badge, Vulcan, Spitfire, Sea King, Lightning II
- 2019: 75th anniversary of D-Day
- 2019: 260th anniversary of Wedgwood
- 2019: 250th anniversary of Samuel Pepys' final diary entry
- 2019: 250th anniversary of Captain Cook's Voyage of Discovery (2nd coin)
- 2020: 75th anniversary of Victory in Europe Day
- 2020: 400th anniversary of the Mayflower voyage
- 2020: 100th anniversary of Agatha Christie's first book
- 2020: 250th anniversary of Captain Cook's Voyage of Discovery (3rd coin)
- 2021: 75th anniversary of the death of H. G. Wells
- 2021: 250th anniversary of the birth of Sir Walter Scott
- 2022: Dame Vera Lynn
- 2022: 150th anniversary of the FA Cup
- 2022: 100th anniversary of the death of Alexander Graham Bell
- 2022: 25th anniversary of the bimetallic £2 coin
- 2023: 50th anniversary of the death of JRR Tolkien
- 2023: 100th anniversary of the Flying Scotsman
- 2023: 200th anniversary of the death of Edward Jenner
- 2023: Ada Lovelace

== Sources ==
- Royal Mint website
