= International May 12th Awareness Day =

Awareness day for various medical conditions

- Official name: International May 12th Awareness Day
- Also called: ME/CFS Awareness Day, International Fibromyalgia Awareness Day, Multiple Chemical Sensitivity Awareness Day
- Observed by: Australia, Canada, UK, United States and others
- Liturgical color: blue, purple, green
- Type: International
- Significance: Awareness of Chronic Immunological Neurological Diseases including ME/CFS, fibromyalgia, multiple chemical sensitivity, Gulf War syndrome, and others
- Date: May 12
- Next time: 12 May 2027
- Frequency: annual
- First time: 1993
- Started by: Tom Hennessy
- Related to: Severe ME Day (August 8th), ME/CFS Awareness Month (May), ME/CFS Awareness Week (second week of May)

International May 12th Awareness Day, also known as International ME/CFS Awareness Day, is held every year to raise awareness of myalgic encephalomyelitis/chronic fatigue syndrome, fibromyalgia, multiple chemical sensitivity, Gulf War syndrome and other chronic immunological and neurological diseases (CIND).

International May 12th Awareness Day aims to:

- Increase public awareness of the importance of ME/CFS, fibromyalgia, multiple chemical sensitivity, Gulf War syndrome and other chronic immunological and neurological diseases (CIND)
- Educate about the symptoms and impact of myalgic encephalomyelitis/chronic fatigue syndrome, fibromyalgia, and other CINDs
- Advocate for increased research funding, particularly for ME/CFS and fibromyalgia
- Many fundraising events take place on May 12

== Illnesses ==
The main illnesses involved in International May 12th Awareness Day are ME/CFS, fibromyalgia, multiple chemical sensitivity, and Gulf War syndrome.

Other Chronic Immunological and Neurological Diseases also recognized by the event include Addison's, Alzheimer's, autism, celiac, chronic myofascial pain, Crohn's, epilepsy, irritable bowel disease (IBD), Lou Gehrig's (ALS), lupus, Lyme disease, mold/biotoxin illness, multiple sclerosis (MS), orthostatic intolerance (OI), Parkinson's, postural orthostatic tachycardia syndrome (POTS), reflex sympathetic dystrophy syndrome (RSD), and ulcerative colitis.

== Events ==
International May 12th Awareness Day is observed by dying hair blue or dressing up in blue. Since 2016, the #MillionsMissing protests for ME/CFS have taken place every May, with the main event held on May 12. Film screenings are usually held for films about ME/CFS, including Voices from the Shadows, Forgotten Plague, or Unrest. Public landmarks are lit up in color for International May 12th Awareness Day, typically using blue for ME and purple for fibromyalgia.

== History ==
In 2006 a British charity created Severe ME Awareness Day on August 8 as a day of remembrance and understanding for those who died from or with ME. August 8 was chosen because it is the birthday of Sophia Mirza, who was believed to be the first British person to have chronic fatigue syndrome listed as a cause of death.

== Related observances ==
- 5/1 – 5/31: Myalgic Encephalomyelitis Awareness Month
- 5/1 – 5/31: Fibromyalgia Awareness Month
- 5/1 - 5/31: Multiple Chemical Sensitivity Awareness Month
- Week of May 12: Myalgic Encephalomyelitis Awareness Week
- 8/8: Severe ME Awareness Day
