= Bonnie Bullough =

American sexologist, nurse, and author (1927–1996)

- Born: January 5, 1927; Delta, Utah, U.S.
- Died: April 12, 1996 (aged 69)
- Education: University of California, Los Angeles (PhD)
- Occupations: Sexologist; author; nurse
- Spouse: Vern Bullough (m. 1947)
- Children: 5
- Scientific career
- Fields: Sexology

Bonnie Louise (née Larsen) Bullough (5 January 1927 in Delta, Utah – 12 April 1996) was an accomplished sexologist and author, who helped to develop the first Nurse Practitioner Program in California at UCLA in 1968. Throughout her career, she edited or wrote 30 books as well as 112 published articles.

== Educational involvement ==
Bullough finished her bachelor's degree in 1955, after working as a public health nurse in the Chicago Public Health Department while her husband, Vern Bullough, completed his doctorate. Bullough received her masters in nursing from the University of California, Los Angeles (UCLA), in 1959, followed by a masters and Ph.D. in sociology. After starting the first nurse practitioner program in California at UCLA, she went on to develop a masters program in nursing, one of the first in the United States. In 1975, she became the coordinator of graduate studies at California State University, Long Beach, directing nurse practitioner education. She became the dean of nursing at SUNY-Buffalo in 1979, and is considered a pioneer in the University of Buffalo School of Nursing.

== Awards and accomplishments ==
- Nurse Practitioner of the Year - 1991
- Alfred C. Kinsey Award - 1995
- Founder of Nurse Practitioner Program at UCLA - 1969
- Society for the Scientific Study of Sexuality Co-Founder

== Legacy ==
Bonnie Bullough's archives reside at the University Library at California State University, Northridge, where an endowment in her name funds special lectures, scholarships, and collection development in sex and gender studies.

== Selected bibliography ==
- Poverty, Ethnic Identity, and Health Care - 1972
- Sin, Sickness and Sanity: A History of Sexual Attitudes - 1977
- Prostitution: an Illustrated Social History - 1978
- Nursing: A Historical Bibliography - 1981
- Women and Prostitution: A Social History - 1987
- Cross Dressing, Sex, and Gender - 1993
- Human Sexuality: An Encyclopedia - 1994
- Nursing Issues for the Nineties and Beyond - 1994
- How I Got Into Sex - 1997
- Gender Blending - 1997
- Contraception: A Guide to Birth Control Methods - 1997
