= Vern Bullough =

American historian and sexologist (1928 – 2006)

- Born: Vern Leroy Bullough; July 24, 1928; Salt Lake City, Utah, U.S.
- Died: June 21, 2006 (aged 77); Westlake Village, California, U.S.
- Education: University of Utah (A.B.), University of Chicago (A.M., Ph.D.), California State University, Long Beach (B.S.N.)
- Occupations: Historian, sexologist, academic
- Known for: Research in sexology, history of prostitution, gender studies
- Spouse(s): Bonnie Bullough (m. 1947–1996), Gwen Brewer (m. after 1996)
- Children: 5

Vern Leroy Bullough (July 24, 1928 – June 21, 2006) was an American historian and sexologist.

He was a distinguished professor emeritus at the State University of New York (SUNY) at Buffalo, Faculty President at California State University, Northridge, a past president of the Society for the Scientific Study of Sexuality, past Dean of natural and social sciences at the Buffalo State College in Buffalo, New York, one of the founders of the American Association for the History of Nursing, and a member of the editorial board of Paidika: The Journal of Paedophilia.

== Early life and career ==
Born in Salt Lake City, Utah, to a Mormon family, Bullough earned his A.B. at the University of Utah in 1951. He then attended the University of Chicago, earning an A.M. in 1951 and a Ph.D. in 1954, and was a university fellow during 1953–1954. In 1981, he received a B.S.N. from California State University, Long Beach.

Bullough was the author, co-author, or editor of nearly 50 books. He also contributed chapters to over 70 books, and wrote over 100 refereed articles, and hundreds of more popular ones. His expertise encompassed several fields: sexology, history, community health and public policy, contraception and population issues. He lectured in most of the 50 states and 20 or so foreign countries including China, Russia, Greece, Egypt, Ghana, et al. Among his many awards was the Alfred Kinsey Award for distinguished sex research.

He began teaching at Youngstown University, where he was an assistant professor of History and Social Science from 1954 to 1959. He then moved to California State University, Northridge, in 1959, and was promoted to associate professor in 1962, and to Professor in 1965. Later in his career he taught at the State University of New York at Buffalo and USC.

In 1992, Bullough received a Distinguished Humanist Service Award from the International Humanist and Ethical Union (IHEU), and served as co-chairman of the IHEU (1995–1996). In 2003, he was one of the signers of the Humanist Manifesto. His book Before Stonewall: Activists for Gay and Lesbian Rights in Historical Context was a 2004 Stonewall Honor Book in Non-Fiction.

Today, Bullough is remembered mainly as an eminent sexologist and medical historian, and a pioneer in the scientific study of alternative sexual behaviors.

== Personal life and death ==
He was married in 1947 to Bonnie Bullough and had five children, the oldest of whom died in childhood in Egypt in 1967. After the death of Bonnie Bullough in 1996, he married Gwen Brewer. He died in Westlake Village in 2006.

== Legacy ==
Bullough's archives reside at the University Library at California State University, Northridge, where an endowment in his name funds special lectures, scholarships, and collection development in sex and gender studies.

== Published works ==
- The History of Prostitution. New Hyde Park, NY: University Books, 1964.
- The Emergence of Modern Nursing. London: Macmillan, 1969.
- Man in Western Civilization. New York: Holt, Rinehart, and Winston, 1970.
- The Subordinate Sex: A History of Attitudes Toward Women. Urbana, IL: University of Illinois Press, 1973.
- Sexual Variance in Society and History. New York: Wiley, 1976.
- Sex, Society, and History. New York: Science History Publications, 1976.
- A Bibliography of Prostitution. New York: Garland Publishing, 1977.
- Sin, Sickness & Sanity: A History of Sexual Attitudes. New York: Garland Publishing, 1977.
- Prostitution: An Illustrated Social History. New York: Crown Publishers, 1978.
- Homosexuality: A History. New York: New American Library, 1979.
- Sexual Practices and the Medieval Church. New York: Prometheus Books, 1982.
- Health Care for the Other Americans. New York: Appleton-Century-Crofts, 1982.
- Nursing Issues and Nursing Strategies for the Eighties. New York: Springer, 1983.
- History, Trends, and Politics of Nursing. Norwalk, CT: Appleton-Century-Crofts, 1984.
- Women and Prostitution: A Social History. Buffalo, NY: Prometheus Books, 1987.
- Cross Dressing, Sex, and Gender (with Bonnie Bullough). Philadelphia: University of Pennsylvania Press, 1993.
- Human Sexuality: An Encyclopedia. New York: Garland Publishing, 1994.
- Nursing Issues for the Nineties and Beyond. New York: Springer, 1994.
- Sexual Attitudes: Myths & Realities. Amherst, NY: Prometheus Books, 1995.
- Handbook of Medieval Sexuality. New York: Garland Publishing, 1996.
- Contraception: A Guide to Birth Control Methods: Condoms, Spermicides, Diaphragms, Sterilization, Natural Family Planning, the Pill. Amherst, NY: Prometheus Books, 1997.
- Encyclopedia of Birth Control. Santa Barbara, CA: ABC-CLIO, 2001.
- Before Stonewall: Activists for Gay and Lesbian Rights in Historical Context. New York: Routledge, 2002.
- Universities, Medicine and Science in the Medieval West. Burlington, VT: Ashgate, 2004.
- Adolescence, Sexuality, and the Criminal Law: Multidisciplinary Perspectives. Oxford: Routledge, 2005.
