= Massey (surname) =

Massey is a surname. Notable people with the surname include:

== Academia, research and science ==
- Doreen Massey (geographer) (1944–2016), British social scientist and geographer
- Frank J. Massey (1919–1995), American statistician
- Harrie Massey, Australian mathematical physicist
- James Massey, American information theorist and cryptographer
- Kenneth Massey, American mathematician and sports statistician
- Mary Massey (1915 – 1974), American historian of the American Civil War
- Walter E. Massey, American university president
- William A. Massey (mathematician), American mathematician
- William S. Massey (1920–2017), American mathematician

== Arts and entertainment ==
=== Actors ===
- Anna Massey, British actress
- Brandi Chavonne Massey, American stage actress and singer
- Christopher Massey, American actor
- Daniel Massey (actor) (1933–1998), British-Canadian actor
- Edith Massey, American actress
- Ilona Massey, Hungarian-born American actress
- Kyle Massey, American actor
- Petra Massey, British actress
- Raymond Massey, Canadian actor
- Vikrant Massey, Indian actor

=== Others in arts and entertainment ===
- Alana Massey, American author
- Arthur Massey (composer), Australian organist
- Brandon Massey, American horror writer
- Devon Massey, comics artist
- Drew Massey, puppeteer
- Gerald Massey, English poet
- Graham Massey, British musician
- John Massey (artist) (born 1950), Canadian artist
- John Massey (poet), a conjectured author of Sir Gawain and the Green Knight
- Joseph Massey sen. (1826–1900), Australian musician
- Sujata Massey, mystery writer

== Business ==
- Daniel Massey (manufacturer) (1798–1856), farm implement manufacturer
- Hart Massey, Canadian businessman
- Jack C. Massey (1904–1990), American venture capitalist and entrepreneur

== Crime ==
- Jason Massey, American convicted double murderer
- John Massey (prisoner), one-time longest serving prisoner in the United Kingdom
- Paul Massey, English organised crime figure from Salford
- Sonya Massey, Illinois woman shot and killed by police

== Military ==
- Alan Massey, Vice Admiral in the British Royal Navy
- Edward Massey, British soldier

== Politics ==
- Charles Vincent Massey (1887–1967), Governor General of Canada
- Denton Massey, Canadian politician
- Doreen Massey, Baroness Massey of Darwen (born 1938), Labour member of the House of Lords
- Duncan Massey, Scottish politician
- Jack Massey (politician) (1885–1964), New Zealand politician of the Reform Party and then the National Party
- John E. Massey (1819–1901), Lieutenant Governor of Virginia
- John Massey (MP) (fl. 1414), English Member of Parliament
- Nehemiah George Massey, Canadian politician, namesake of the George Massey Tunnel
- Nellah Massey, (1893–1956), maiden name of Nellah Massey Bailey, American politician and librarian
- William Massey (1856–1925), Prime Minister of New Zealand
- William A. Massey, U.S. Senator
- William Nathaniel Massey (1809–1881), British author and politician
- Vincent Massey, Canadian politician, brother of Raymond Massey

== Sport ==
=== Baseball ===
- Bill Massey (baseball) (1871–1940), baseball player in 1894
- Michael Massey (born 1998), American baseball player
- Mike Massey (baseball), American baseball player

=== Cricket ===
- Bruce Massey (1906–1994), New Zealand cricketer
- Eileen Massey (1935–2019), Australian cricketer
- John Massey (cricketer) (1899–1963), English cricketer
- William Massey (cricketer) (1846–1899), played cricket for Somerset and Lancashire
- William Massey (rower) (1817–1898), rowed and played cricket for Cambridge University

=== Other sports ===
- Chris Massey, American football player
- Becky Massey (born 2000), Belgian basketball player
- Bill Massey (softball) (1936–2020), New Zealand softball player
- Debbie Massey, American golfer
- Jack Massey (footballer) (died 1981), Australian rules footballer
- Matthew and Nicholas Massey, American professional wrestlers collectively known as The Young Bucks
- Mike Massey, American professional pocket-billiards player

== Other ==
- Annie Guinn Massey (1872–1948), American socialite and clubwoman
- Geoffrey Massey (1924–2020), Canadian architect and urban planner

== See also ==
- Massey family
- Masih (surname)
- Massie (surname)
- Massey (disambiguation)
