= John Massey =

John Massey may refer to:

- John Massey (pirate) (died 1723), Royal African Company Captain turned pirate
- John E. Massey (1819–1901), Lieutenant Governor of Virginia
- John Massey (artist) (born 1950), Canadian artist
- John Massey (cricketer) (1899–1963), English cricketer
- Jack Massey (footballer) (John Tolson Massey, died 1981), Australian rules footballer
- John Massey (poet), a conjectured author of Sir Gawain and the Green Knight
- Jack Massey (politician) (John Norman Massey, 1885–1964), New Zealand politician
- John Massey (prisoner), one-time longest serving prisoner in the United Kingdom
- John Massey (priest) (1651–1716), English priest
- John Massey (rugby league), rugby league footballer who played in the 1950s
- John Massey (MP) (fl. 1414), English Member of Parliament

== See also ==
- John Massie (1842–1925), British academic, educationalist and Liberal Party politician
- Jack Massey (disambiguation)
