= Massi =

Massi may refer to:

- Massi, Benin
- Massi (surname), a surname

== See also ==
- Masi (disambiguation)
- Masse (disambiguation)
- Massey (disambiguation)
- Massie (disambiguation)
- Massih
- Massy (disambiguation)
- Messi
