= Massie =

Massie may refer to:

== Places ==
- Massie, Queensland, Australia, a rural locality
- Massie Township, Warren County, Ohio, United States
- Massie Shale, a geologic formation in Ohio
- Massie Creek, Missouri, United States

== People ==
- Massie (surname)
- Massie L. Kennard (1918–1986), African-American Lutheran pastor
- Thomas Massie (born 1971), American politician and engineer

== Other uses ==
- Massie School, the first public school in Savannah, Georgia, United States
- Massie Variety Store
- Massie Block, a fictional character from the Clique Series

== See also ==
- Massie Trial, a 1932 murder trial in Hawaii
- Massie House, Falling Spring, Alleghany County, Virginia, United States, a home on the National Register of Historic Places
- Massie Wireless Station, Point Judith, Rhode Island, United States, possibly the oldest surviving working wireless station in the world
- Massee, a surname
- Massey (disambiguation)
