= Masse (surname) =

Masse and Massé are French surnames that may refer to

- Alfred Massé (1870–1951), French lawyer, journalist and politician
- Arthur Massé (1894–1972), Canadian politician
- Bill Masse (born 1966), American baseball outfielder
- Bob Masse, Canadian artist
- Brian Masse (born 1968), Canadian politician
- Carole Massé (born 1949), Canadian writer
- Charles August Masse, 19th century American politician
- Dany Massé (born 1988), Canadian ice hockey player
- Énemond Massé (1575–1646), French Jesuit missionary
- Francis Masse (born 1948), French cartoonist
- Heather Masse, American alto singer
- Henri Massé (1886–1969), French orientalist
- Jean-Baptiste Masse (c. 1700–1757), French composer and violoncello player
- John Massé (born 1969), American animator, voice over artist and producer
- Julie Masse (born 1970), Canadian pop singer
- Kylie Masse (born 1996), Canadian competition swimmer
- Manon Massé (born 1963), Canadian politician
- Marcel Masse (1936–2014), Canadian politician
- Marcel Massé (born 1940), Canadian politician
- Papa Massé Fall (born 1985), Senegalese-born Bissau-Guinean football player and coach
- Paul-André Massé, (1947–2019), Canadian politician
- Pierre Massé (1898–1987), French economist, engineer, applied mathematician, and high government official
- Victor Massé (born Félix-Marie Massé; 1822–1884), French composer

== See also ==
- Masse (disambiguation) – includes non-surname entries
- Massie
- Massee
- Massay, a commune in the Cher department of France
