= Masse =

Masse may refer to

- Masse (surname)
- Massè, an arrondissement in Benin
- Massé, a billiards, pool, and snooker cueing technique that produces a curving shot
- Masei, the 43rd weekly portion in the annual Jewish cycle of Torah reading
- Pointe de la Masse, a mountain in France
- Levy en Masse Act 1803 by the Parliament of the United Kingdom
- Crampe en masse, a Canadian comedy duo
  - Crampe en masse et le hot dog géant, an album by Crampe en masse
  - Crampe en Masse (album) by Crampe en masse
- En Masse Entertainment, a Seattle-based PC and mobile game-publishing company
- Levée en masse, the policy of military conscription adopted after the French Revolution of 1789

== See also ==
- Mass (disambiguation)
