= Ganzfried =

Ganzfried is a surname. Notable people with the surname include:

- Shlomo Ganzfried (1804–1886), Hungarian rabbi
- Daniel Ganzfried (born 1958), Swiss author
