= Massee =

Surname list

Massee is the surname of the following people:

- George Edward Massee (1845–1917), English mycologist, plant pathologist, and botanist
- J. C. Massee (1871–1965), American Christian fundamentalist
- May Massee (1881–1966), American children's book editor
- Michael Massee (1952–2016), American actor

== See also ==
- Masse (disambiguation)
- Massee Lane Gardens
- Massey (disambiguation)
- Massie (disambiguation)
