= Jack Massey =

Jack Massey may refer to:

- Jack Massey (politician) (1885–1964), New Zealand politician of the Reform Party and then the National Party
- Jack Massey (footballer) (1887–1981), Australian rules footballer
- Jack C. Massey (1904–1990), American venture capitalist and entrepreneur
- Jack Massey (boxer) (born 1993), English boxer

== See also ==
- John Massey (disambiguation)
