= Masley =

Masley is a surname. Notable people with the surname include:

- Frank Masley (1960–2016), American luger
- Michael Masley (born 1952), American musician

== See also ==
- Malley
- Massey (surname)
- Mount Masley, a mountain of Victoria Land, Antarctica
