= Shlomo Ganzfried =

Hungarian Orthodox rabbi

Rabbi Shlomo Ganzfried
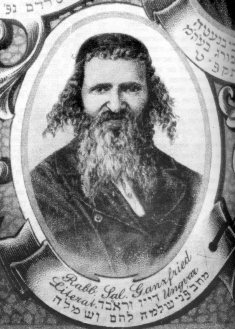
- Rabbi Shlomo Ganzfried
- Title: Rabbi

Personal life
- Born: Shlomo ben Joseph Ganzfried; 1804 Ungvár, Com. Ung, Royal Hungary
- Died: July 30, 1886 (aged 81–82) Ungvár, Com. Ung, Royal Hungary
- Parent: Joseph Ganzfried
- Notable work(s): Kitzur Shulchan Aruch, Kesset HaSofer, Pnei Shlomo, Torat Zevach, Sefer Apiryon, Lechem V'simlah, Ohalei Sheim, Sheim Shlomo, Sefer Galuy
- Known for: Author of Kitzur Shulchan Aruch
- Occupation: Rabbi, Posek

Religious life
- Religion: Judaism

Jewish leader
- Post: Rabbi of Brezovica, Dayan in Ungvár

Shlomo Ganzfried (or Salomon ben Joseph Ganzfried, Hungarian: Ganzfried Salamon, Hebrew: רַבִּי שְׁלֹמֹה בֶּן יוֹסֵף גאנצפריד, Yiddish: רבּי שְׁלֹמה בֶּן יוֹסף גאַנצפֿריד; 1804, in Ungvár, Com.Ung, Royal Hungary – 30 July 1886, in Ungvár, Ung, Royal Hungary) was an Orthodox rabbi and posek best known as the author of the work of Halakha (Jewish law), the Kitzur Shulchan Aruch (Hebrew: קיצור שולחן ערוך, "The Abbreviated Shulchan Aruch"), by which title he is also known.

== Biography ==
Ganzfried was born in 1804 in Ungvár, in the Ung County of the Kingdom of Hungary (present-day Ukraine). His father Joseph died when he was eight. Ganzfried was considered to be a child prodigy and Ungvár's chief rabbi and Rosh yeshiva, Rabbi Zvi Hirsh Heller assumed legal guardianship; Heller was known as "Hershele the Sharp-witted" for his piercing insights into the Talmud. Heller later moved to the city of Bonyhád, and Ganzfried, then fifteen, followed him. He remained in Heller's yeshiva for almost a decade until his ordination and marriage. After his marriage he worked briefly as a wine merchant.

In 1830, he abandoned commerce and accepted the position of Rabbi of Brezovica (Brezevitz). In 1849, he returned to Ungvár as a dayan, a judge in the religious court. At that time Ungvár's spiritual head, Rabbi Meir Ash, was active in the Orthodox camp, in opposition to the Neologs. Through serving with Ash, Ganzfried realised that in order to remain committed to Orthodoxy, "the average Jew required an underpinning of a knowledge of practical halakha (Jewish law)". It was to this end that Ganzfried composed the Kitzur Shulchan Aruch. This work became very popular, and was frequently reprinted in Hebrew and in Yiddish. This work often records more stringent positions.

Rabbi Ganzfried remained in the office of Dayan until his death on July 30, 1886.

== Works ==
=== Kitzur Shulchan Aruch ===
The Kitzur Shulchan Aruch, first published in 1864, is a summary of the Shulchan Aruch of Joseph Karo with reference to later commentaries. This work was explicitly written as a popular text, in simple Hebrew, and does not have the same level of detail as the Shulchan Aruch itself.

=== Other works ===
- Kesset HaSofer (קסת הסופר), a halachic primer for scribes published in 1835. Ganzfried composed this while he was still engaged in business.
- Pnei Shlomo (פני שלמה), an elucidation of portions of the Talmud.
- Torat Zevach (תורת זבח), a halakhic handbook for practitioners of shechita, ritual slaughter.
- Sefer Apiryon (ספר אפריון), a commentary on the Bible. It contains a piece on every weekly Torah portion except for Parshat Massei, which is also the week in which his yahrzeit falls.
- Lechem V'simlah (לחם ושמלה) on the laws of Niddah.
- Ohalei Sheim (אהלי שם) on the official spellings of Hebrew names, as pertaining to gittin.
- Sheim Shlomo (שם שלמה) on various sugyos in Shas.
- Sefer Galuy A letter written at the time of the Congress of 1869.
