= Chansons drôles de d'autres =

Studio album by Crampe en masse
- Released: 2000
- Genre: Comedy
- Length: 43:06
- Label: Les Éditions Leïla
- Producer: Crampe en masse

Crampe en masse chronology
Roule-toi par terre! (1999)	Chansons drôles de d'autres (2000)	Live en studio (2001)

Chansons drôles de d'autres is the third album by québécois comedy duo Crampe en masse consisting of comedy songs covers.

== Track listing ==
No.	Title	Artist(s)	Length
1.	"Le tango des concaves"	Plume Latraverse	1:49
2.	"La chanson très vulgaire"	Les Cyniques	1:55
3.	"Yaya je ne suis pas tout à moi"	Gilles Richer/Jérôme Lemay)	2:31
4.	"Les fesses"	Yvon Deschamps	3:40
5.	"Zig Zag"	Bernard Tanguay/Pierre F. Brault	1:20
6.	"Ouvre la fenêtre"	Les Charlots	2:35
7.	"Le trou"	Rock et belles oreilles	3:20
8.	"Je vis ma ménopause"	Clémence DesRochers	2:50
9.	"Ça s'existe pas"	(François Avard)	2:40
10.	"La petite grenouille"	André Guitar	4:22
11.	"Les pantoufles à papa"	Claude Nougaro	2:24
12.	"Si tous les cocus"	Les Charlots	2:13
13.	"C'est Noël"	Claude Meunier/Michel Rivard	1:42
14.	"Medley Astérix"		5:51
