= Calendar of saints (Lutheran) =

Religious calendar

The Lutheran Church has, from the time of the Reformation, continued the remembrance of saints. The theological basis for this remembrance is understood as being connected to the words of the Epistle to the Hebrews 12:1. (Note: " "Seeing we also are compassed about with so great a cloud of witnesses, let us lay aside every weight, and the sin which doth so easily beset us, and let us run with patience the race that is set before us.") The Apology of the Augsburg Confession states that the remembrance of the saints has three parts: thanksgiving to God, the strengthening our faith, and the imitation of the saints' holy living. (Note: "The first is thanksgiving. For we ought to give thanks to God because He has shown examples of mercy; because He has shown that He wishes to save men; because He has given teachers or other gifts to the Church. And these gifts, as they are the greatest, should be amplified, and the saints themselves should be praised, who have faithfully used these gifts, just as Christ praises faithful business-men (Matt. 25:21, 23). The second service is the strengthening of our faith; when we see the denial forgiven Peter, we also are encouraged to believe the more that grace truly superabounds over sin (Rom. 5:20). The third honor is the imitation, first, of faith, then of the other virtues, which every one should imitate according to his calling.")

As a result, the Lutheran reformers retained a robust calendar of saints to be commemorated throughout the year. In addition to figures found in the Bible, early Christians such as Saint Lawrence and Martin of Tours were retained as saints on the calendar, as were extra-Biblical commemorations like the Assumption of Mary. Following the Reformation, most especially in the latter half of the twentieth century, many names were added to the calendar, both new and restored pre-Reformation commemorations.

The Calendar found below is a listing of the primary annual feasts, festivals and events that are celebrated liturgically by various Lutheran Churches in the English-speaking world. The calendars of the Lutheran Church–Missouri Synod (LCMS) and the Evangelical Lutheran Church in America (ELCA) in their present forms are listed below, as found in the 2006 Lutheran Service Book of the LCMS, and the 2006 Evangelical Lutheran Worship of the ELCA. In addition to these, some historic observances not currently found on the aforementioned calendars but appearing in earlier Lutheran uses are also provided.

While extensive, the Lutheran sanctoral calendar is not presently as strictly ranked as that of the Roman Catholic Church. Principal festivals are marked with BOLD CAPS and lesser festivals with bold text. If a saint’s day is not commonly observed in North America, the country where that saint is observed is also noted. For individuals, the date given is generally the date of their death or "heavenly birthday." The liturgical color for vestments and paraments is noted as follows: White (W), Red (R) or Violet (V). Commemorations specific to the LCMS, ELCA, or an earlier source are noted following each entry. Commemorations and festivals held in common are not annotated.

== January ==
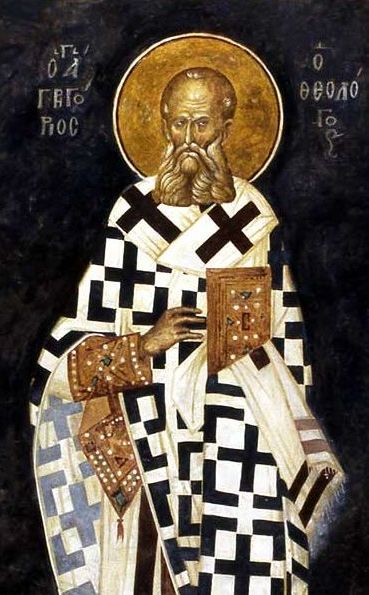
Gregory of Nazianzus

- 1 Circumcision and Name of Jesus (LCMS) Name of Jesus (ELCA) (W)
- 2 Johann Konrad Wilhelm Löhe, pastor, renewer of the church, 1872 (W)
- 3
- 4
- 5
- 6 THE EPIPHANY OF OUR LORD (W)
- 7
- 8
- 9
- 10 St. Basil the Great, Bishop of Caesarea, 379; Gregory of Nazianzus, Bishop of Constantinople, c. 389; Gregory, Bishop of Nyssa, c. 385 (Commemoration) W – LCMS
- 11
- 12
- 13 Octave of the Epiphany - The Baptism of Our Lord (W) - historic, now commonly observed on the Sunday within the Octave of the Epiphany
- 14 Eivind Berggrav, Norwegian Lutheran bishop (Commemoration) W - ELCA
- 15 Martin Luther King Jr., renewer of society, martyr, 1968 (Commemoration) R – ELCA
- 16
- 17 Anthony of Egypt, renewer of the church, c. 356 (Commemoration) W – ELCA
  - Pachomius, renewer of the church, 346 (Commemoration) W – ELCA
- 18 Confession of Peter (W)
  - Week of Prayer for Christian Unity Begins - ELCA
- 19 Henry, Bishop of Uppsala, missionary to Finland, martyr, 1156 (Commemoration) R – ELCA
- 20 Sebastian, Martyr (R) - Historic
  - Sarah, matriarch (Commemoration) W – LCMS
- 21 Agnes, Virgin and Martyr (R)
- 22
- 23
- 24 Saint Timothy, pastor (Lesser Festival) W - LCMS
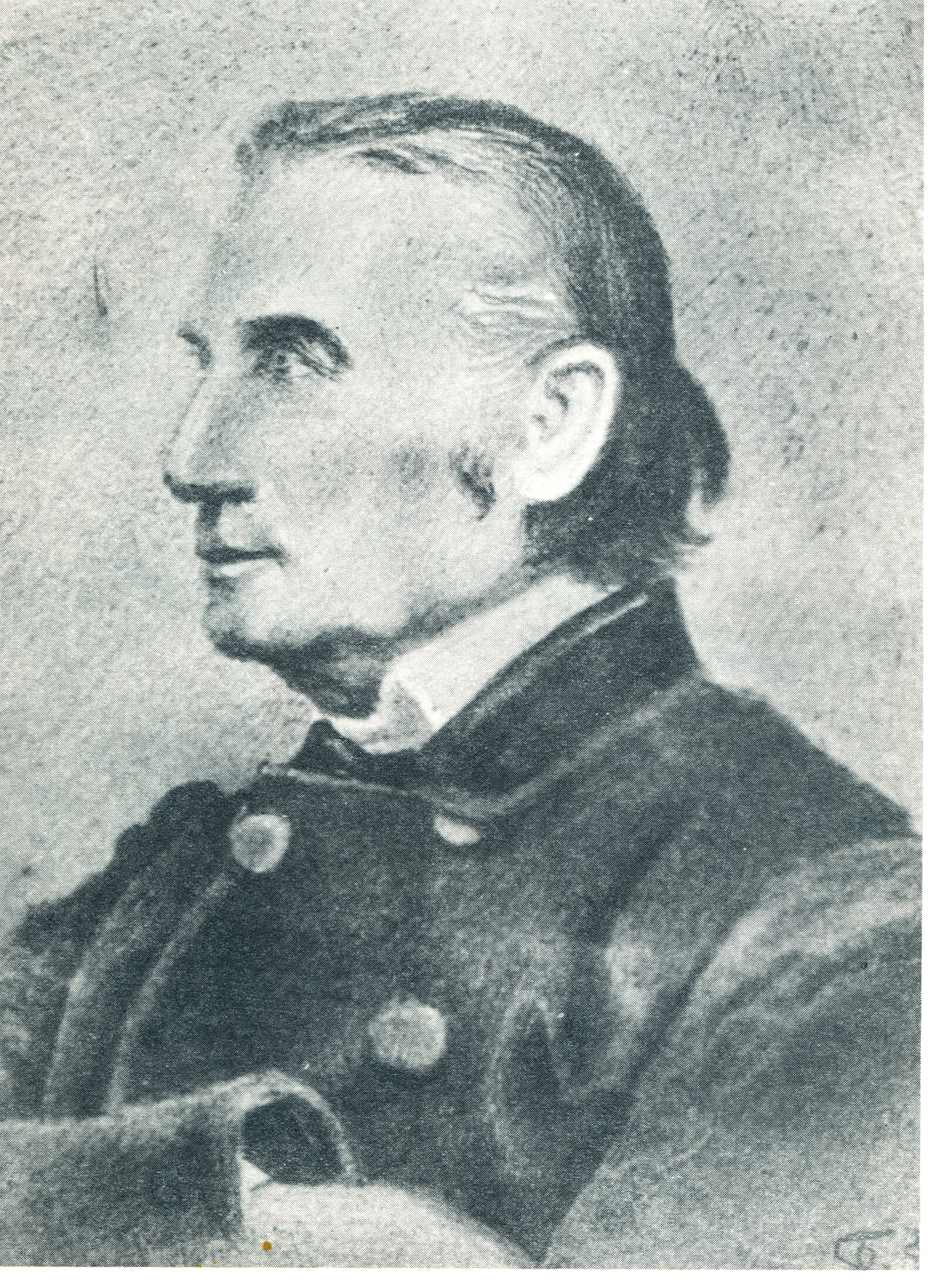
  Johann Konrad Wilhelm Löhe
- 25 Conversion of Paul the Apostle (W)
  - Week of Prayer for Christian Unity Ends - ELCA
- 26 Timothy, Titus, and Silas, missionaries (Commemoration) W – ELCA
  - Saint Titus, pastor (Lesser Festival) W - LCMS
- 27 John Chrysostom, Bishop of Constantinople, 407 (W) – LCMS
  - Lydia, Dorcas, and Phoebe, witnesses to the faith (Commemoration) W – ELCA
- 28 Thomas Aquinas, teacher, 1274 (Commemoration) W – ELCA
- 29
- 30
- 31

== February ==
- 1
- 2 Presentation of our Lord (W)
- 3 Ansgar, Archbishop of Hamburg, missionary to Denmark and Sweden, 865 (Commemoration) W – ELCA
- 4
- 5 The Martyrs of Japan, 1597 (Commemoration) R – ELCA
  - Jacob, patriarch (Commemoration) W – LCMS
- 6
- 7
- 8
- 9
- 10 Silas, apostle (Commemoration) W – LCMS
- 11
- 12
- 13 Aquila, Priscilla, and Apollos (Commemoration) W – LCMS

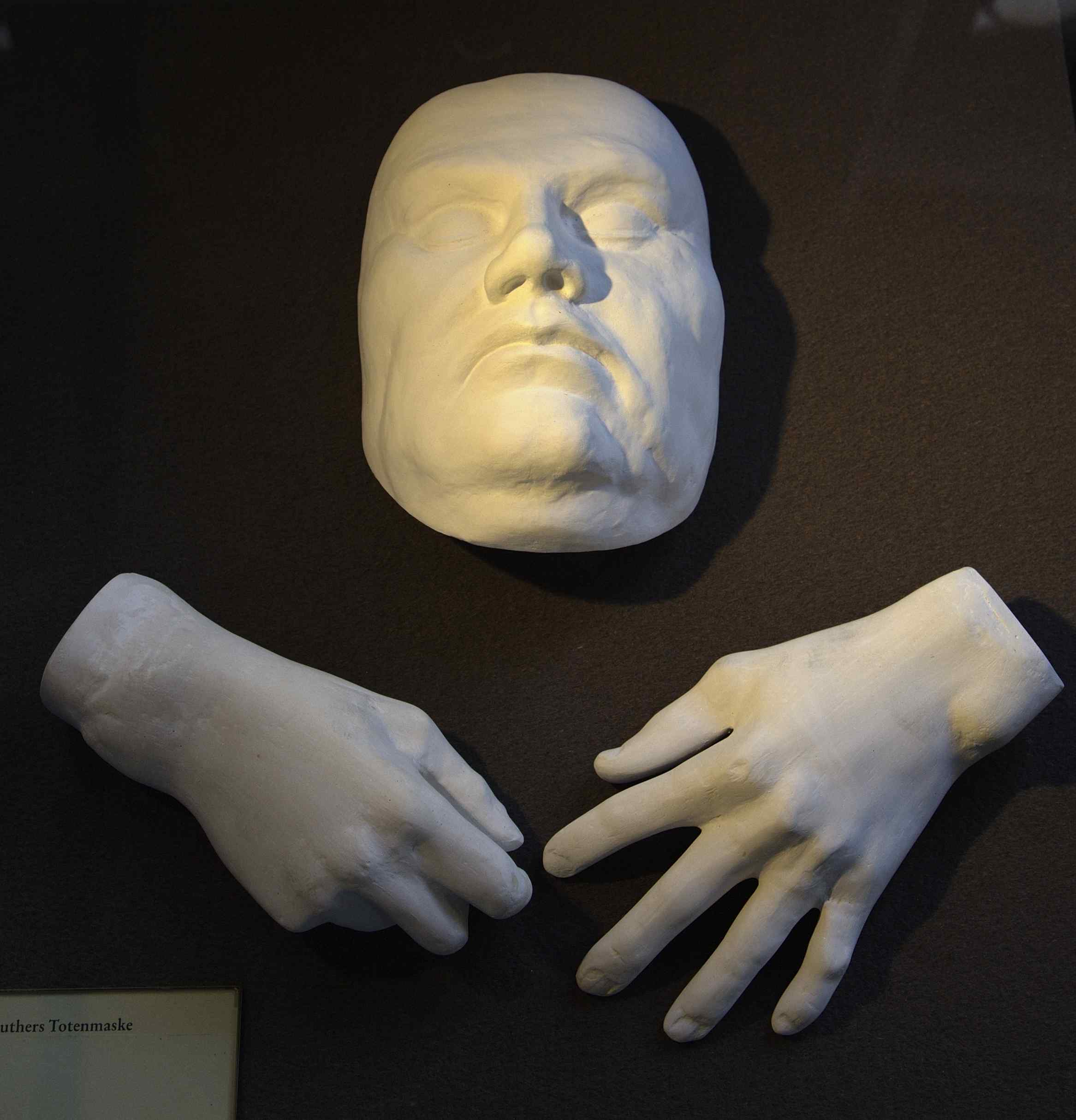
Martin Luther's face and hands cast at his death.

- 14 Cyril, monk, 869; Methodius, bishop, 885; missionaries to the Slavs (Commemoration) W – ELCA
  - Valentine, martyr, 270 (Commemoration) R – LCMS
- 15 Philemon and Onesimus (Commemoration) W – LCMS
- 16 Philipp Melanchthon, confessor, 1560 (Commemoration) R – LCMS
- 17
- 18 Martin Luther, doctor and confessor, renewer of the church, 1546 (Commemoration) W
- 19
- 20
- 21
- 22
- 23 Polycarp, Bishop of Smyrna, martyr 156 (Commemoration) R
- 24 Matthias, Apostle (R) – LCMS (25 February in leap years)
- 25 Elizabeth Fedde, deaconess, 1921 (Commemoration) W – ELCA
- 26
- 27
- 28
- 29

== March ==
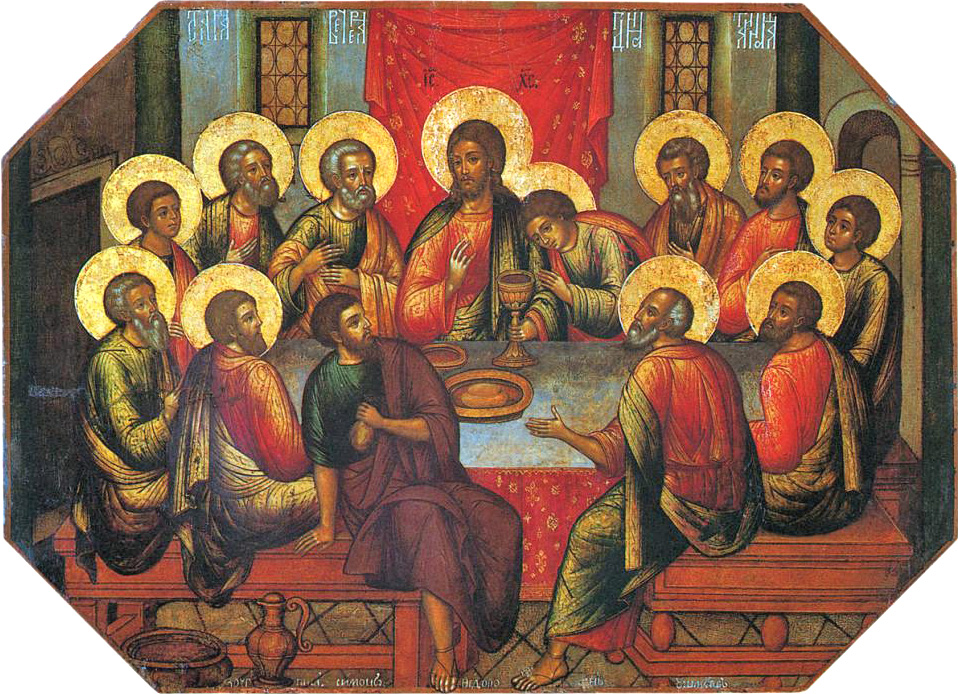
Simon Ushakov, The Last Supper

- 1 George Herbert, priest, hymnwriter, 1633 (Commemoration) W – ELCA
- 2 John Wesley, 1791; Charles Wesley, 1788; priests, renewers of the church (Commemoration) W – ELCA
- 3
- 4
- 5
- 6
- 7 Perpetua and Felicity and companions, martyrs at Carthage, 202 (R)
- 8
- 9
- 10 Harriet Tubman, 1913; Sojourner Truth, 1883; renewers of society (Commemoration) W – ELCA
- 11
- 12 Gregory the Great, Bishop of Rome, 604 (W)
- 13
- 14
- 15

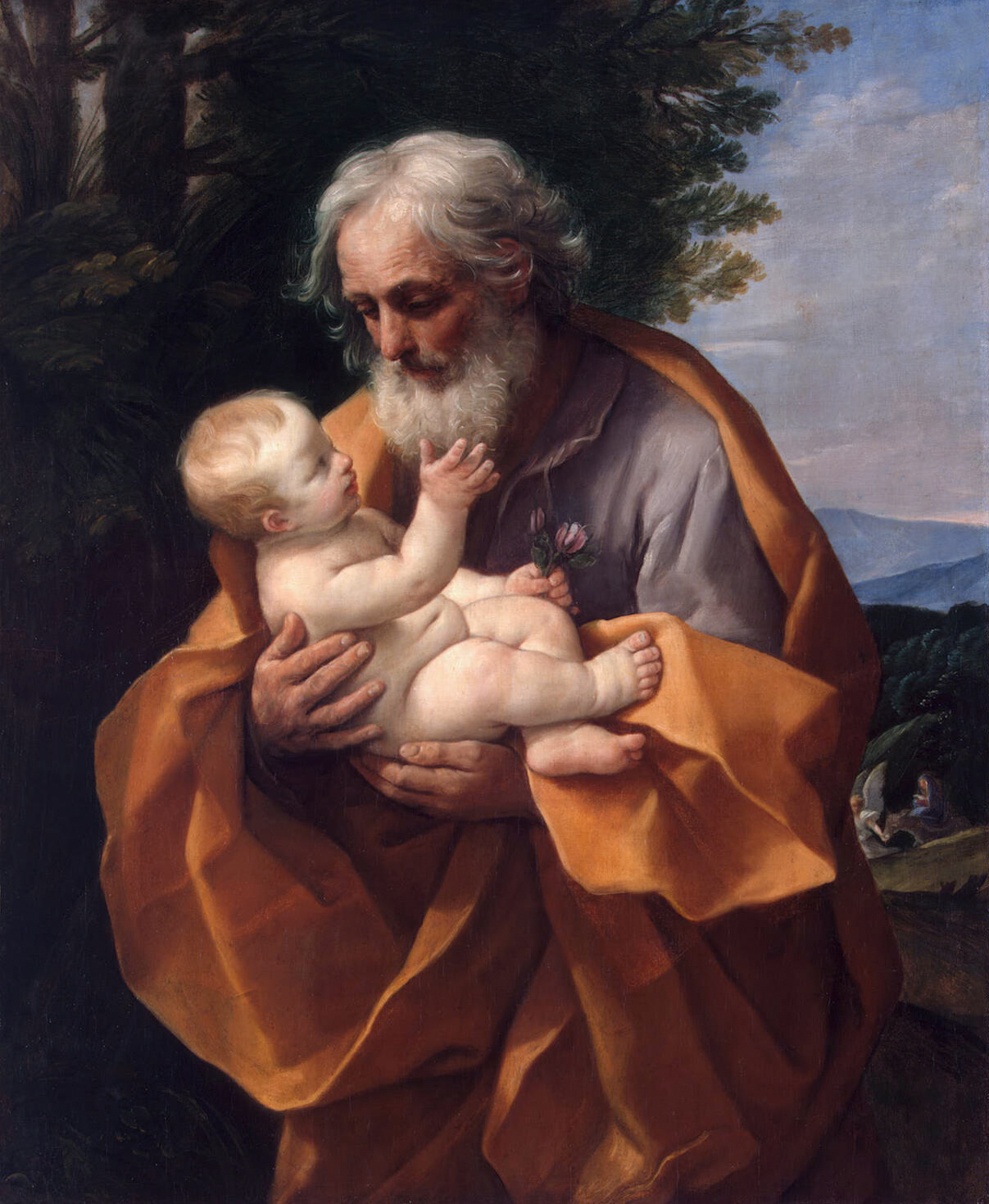
Saint Joseph

- 16
- 17 Patrick, bishop, missionary to Ireland, 461 (Commemoration) W
- 18
- 19 Joseph, Guardian of Jesus (W)
- 20
- 21 Thomas Cranmer, Archbishop of Canterbury, martyr, 1556 (Commemoration) R – ELCA
- 22 Jonathan Edwards, teacher, missionary to American Indians, 1758 (Commemoration) W - ELCA
- 23
- 24 Oscar Arnulfo Romero, Bishop of El Salvador, martyr, 1980 (Commemoration) R – ELCA
- 25 Annunciation of Our Lord (W)
- 26
- 27
- 28
- 29 Hans Nielsen Hauge, renewer of the church, 1824 (Commemoration) W – ELCA
- 30
- 31 John Donne, priest, poet, 1631 (Commemoration) W – ELCA
  - Joseph, patriarch (Commemoration) W – LCMS

== April ==
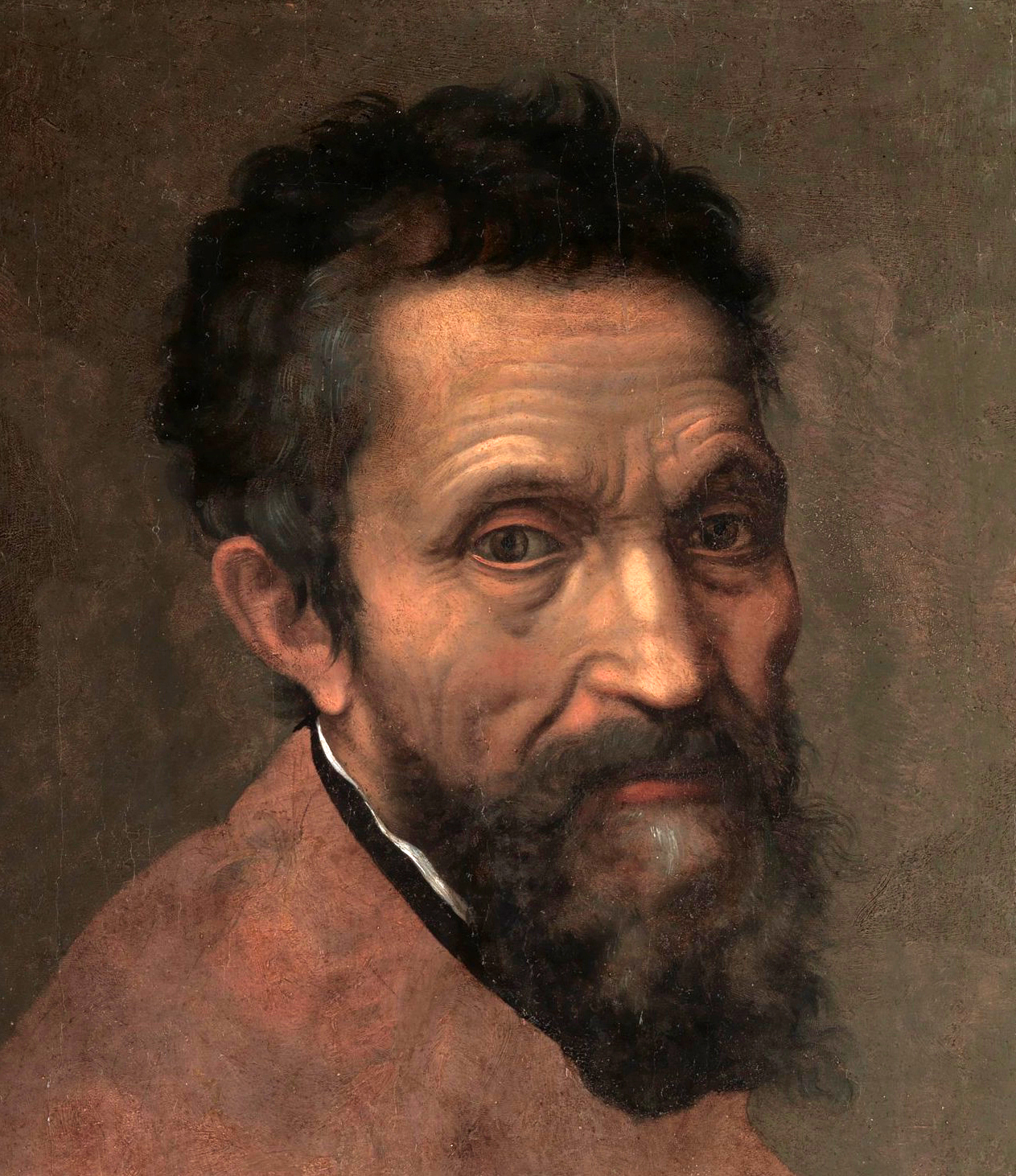
Michelangelo

- 1 Amalie Sieveking, philanthropist and social activist – (Germany)
- 2
- 3
- 4 Benedict the African, confessor, 1589 (Commemoration) W – ELCA
- 5
- 6 Albrecht Dürer, 1528; Lucas Cranach, 1553; artists (Commemoration) W
  - Matthias Grünewald, artist, 1529 (Commemoration) W – ELCA
  - Michelangelo, artist, (Commemoration) W – ELCA
- 7
- 8
- 9 Dietrich Bonhoeffer, theologian, martyr, 1945 (Commemoration) W – ELCA
- 10 Mikael Agricola, Bishop of Turku, 1557 (Commemoration) W – ELCA
- 11
- 12
- 13
- 14
- 15
- 16
- 17
- 18
- 19 Olaus Petri, priest, 1552; Laurentius Petri, Archbishop of Uppsala, 1573; renewers of the church (Commemoration) W – ELCA
- 20 Johannes Bugenhagen, pastor, 1558 (Commemoration) – LCMS
- 21 Anselm, Archbishop of Canterbury, theologian, 1109 (Commemoration) W

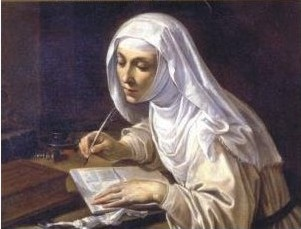
Catherine of Siena

- 22 Day of Creation [Earth Day] (Lesser Festival) W – ELCA
- 23 Toyohiko Kagawa, renewer of society, 1960 (Commemoration) W - ELCA
- 24 Johann Walter, musician, 1570 (Commemoration) W – LCMS
- 25 Mark, Evangelist (R)
- 26
- 27
- 28
- 29 Catherine of Siena, theologian, 1380 (Commemoration) W – ELCA
- 30

== May ==
- 1 Philip and James, Apostles (R)
- 2 Athanasius, Bishop of Alexandria, 373 (Commemoration) W
- 3
- 4 Monica, mother of Augustine, 387 (Commemoration) W – ELCA
  - Friedrich Wyneken, pastor, missionary, 1864 (Commemoration) W – LCMS
- 5 Frederick the Wise, Christian ruler, 1525 (Commemoration) W – LCMS
- 6
- 7 Carl F. W. Walther, pastor, theologian, 1887 (Commemoration) W – LCMS
- 8 Julian of Norwich, renewer of the Church, c. 1416 (Commemoration) W – ELCA
- 9 Nicolaus Ludwig von Zinzendorf, renewer of the church, hymnwriter, 1760 (Commemoration) W – ELCA
  - Job, patriarch (Commemoration) W – LCMS

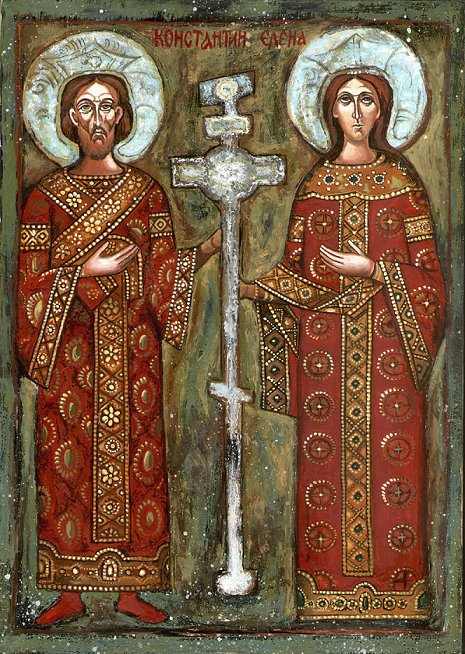
Sts. Constantine and Helen

- 10
- 11 Cyril, 869 and Methodius, 885, missionaries to the Slavs (Commemoration) W – LCMS
- 12
- 13
- 14 Matthias, apostle (Lesser Festival) R – ELCA
- 15
- 16
- 17
- 18 Erik, King of Sweden, martyr, 1160 (Commemoration) R – ELCA
- 19
- 20
- 21 Helena, mother of Constantine, c. 330 (W)
  - Emperor Constantine, Emperor of Rome, 337 (Commemoration) W – LCMS
- 22
- 23
- 24 Nicolaus Copernicus, 1543; Leonhard Euler, 1783; scientists (Commemoration) W – ELCA
  - Esther, matriarch, (Commemoration) W – LCMS
- 25 Bede, theologian, 735 (Commemoration) R – LCMS
- 26
- 27 John Calvin, renewer of the church, 1564 (Commemoration) W – ELCA
- 28
- 29 Juraj Tranovský, hymnwriter, 1637 (Commemoration) W – ELCA
- 30
- 31 Visit of Mary to Elizabeth -- minor festival (W) - modern date

== June ==
- 1 Justin, martyr at Rome, c. 165 (Commemoration) R
- 2
- 3 Martyrs of Uganda, 1886 (Commemoration) R – ELCA
  - John XXIII, Bishop of Rome, 1963 (Commemoration) W – ELCA
- 4
- 5 Boniface, Archbishop of Mainz, missionary to Germany, martyr, 754 (Commemoration) R
- 6
- 7 Seattle, chief of the Duwamish Confederacy, 1866 (Commemoration) W – ELCA
- 8
- 9 Columba, 597; Aidan, 651; Bede, 735; teachers, renewers of the church (Commemoration) W – ELCA
- 10
- 11 Barnabas, Apostle (R)
- 12 First Ecumenical Council, 325 (Commemoration) W – LCMS
- 13
- 14 Basil the Great, Bishop of Caesarea, 379; Gregory of Nazianzus, Bishop of Constantinople, c. 389; Gregory, Bishop of Nyssa, c. 385 (Commemoration) W – ELCA
  - Macrina, theologian, c. 379 (Commemoration) W – ELCA
  - Elisha, prophet (Commemoration) R – LCMS
- 15

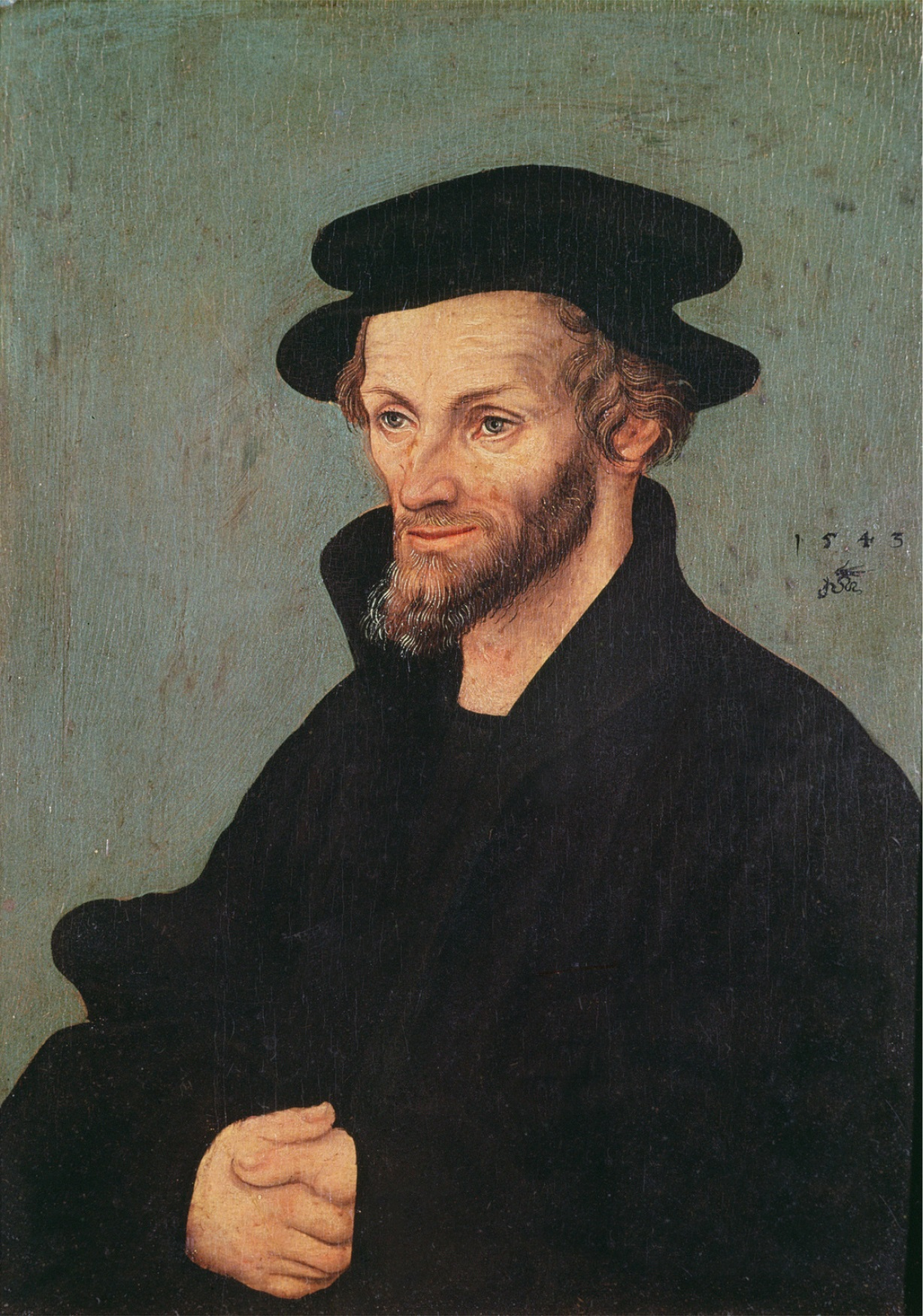
Lucas Cranach the Elder, Philipp Melanchthon

- 16
- 17
- 18
- 19
- 20
- 21 Onesimos Nesib, translator, evangelist, 1931 (Commemoration) W – ELCA
- 22
- 23
- 24 John the Baptist (W)
- 25 Presentation of the Augsburg Confession, 1530 (Commemoration) W
  - Philipp Melanchthon, renewer of the church, 1560 (Commemoration) W – ELCA
- 26 John and Paul, Martyrs - LCMS
  - Jeremiah, prophet (Commemoration) R – LCMS
- 27 Cyril, Bishop of Alexandria, 444 (Commemoration) W
- 28 Irenaeus, Bishop of Lyons, c. 202 (Commemoration) W
- 29 Peter and Paul, Apostles (R)
- 30 Commemoration of Paul the Apostle (R) - Historic

== July ==
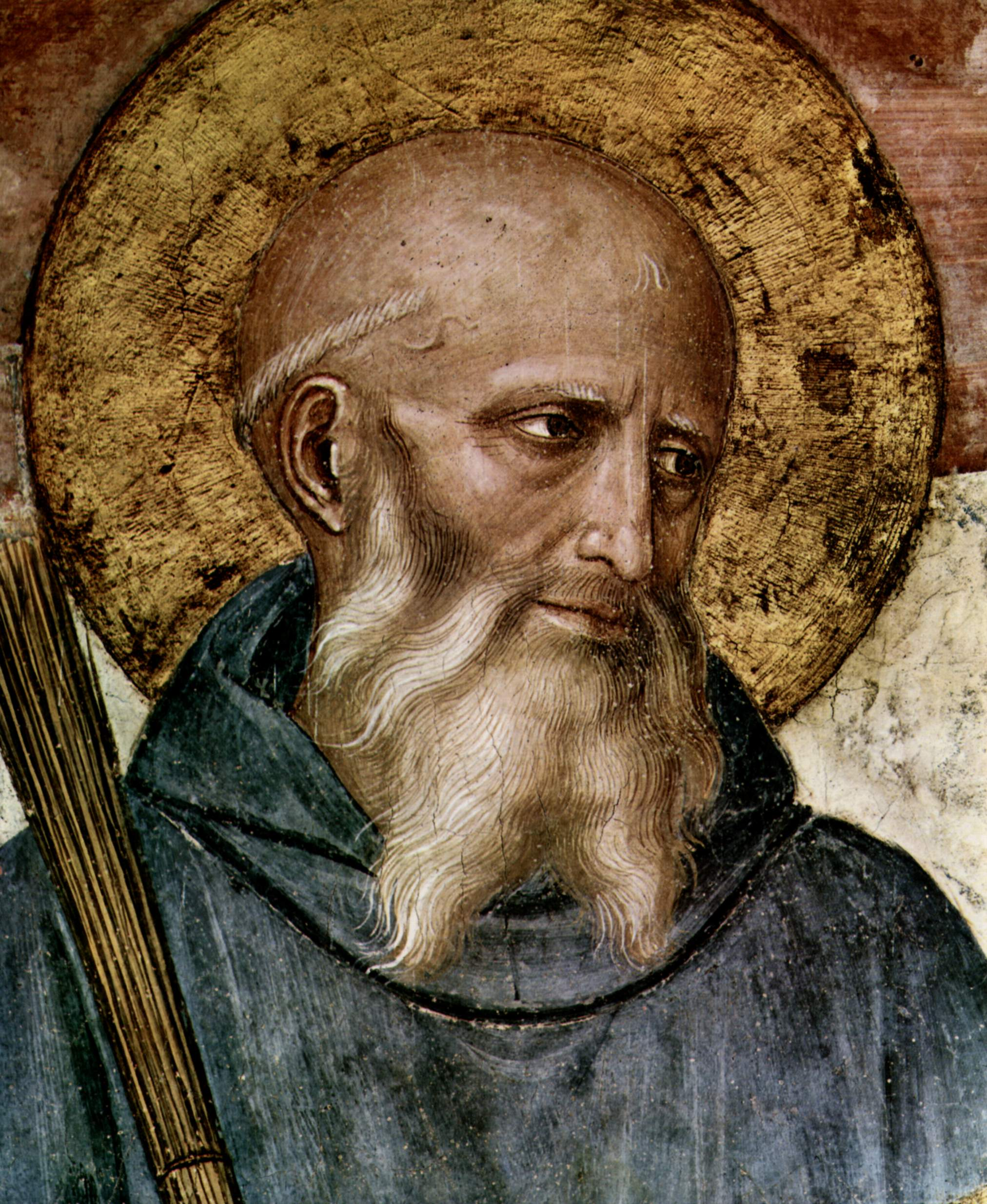
Benedict of Nursia

- 1 Catherine Winkworth, 1878; John Mason Neale, 1866; hymn translators (Commemoration) W – ELCA
- 2
- 3 Thomas, apostle (Lesser Festival) R – ELCA
- 4
- 5 St. Cyril and Methodius (Lesser festival) - amongst Slovak Lutherans
- 6 Jan Hus, martyr, 1415 (Commemoration) R – ELCA
  - Isaiah, prophet (Commemoration) R – LCMS
- 7
- 8
- 9
- 10
- 11 Benedict of Nursia, Abbot of Monte Cassino, c. 540 (Commemoration) W – ELCA
- 12 Nathan Söderblom, Archbishop of Uppsala, 1931 (Commemoration) W – ELCA
- 13
- 14
- 15 The Division of the Holy Apostles (R) - Historic
- 16 Ruth, matriarch (Commemoration) W – LCMS
- 17 Bartolomé de Las Casas, missionary to the Indies, 1566 (Commemoration) W – ELCA
- 18
- 19

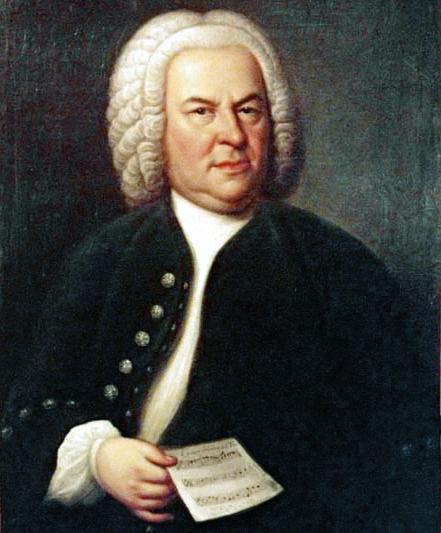
Elias Gottlob Haussmann, Johann Sebastian Bach

- 20 Elijah, prophet (Commemoration) R – LCMS
- 21 Ezekiel, prophet (Commemoration) R – LCMS
- 22 Mary Magdalene, (W)
- 23 Birgitta of Sweden, renewer of the church, 1373 (Commemoration) W – ELCA
- 24
- 25 James, Apostle (R)
- 26
- 27
- 28 Johann Sebastian Bach, 1750 W
  - Heinrich Schütz, 1672; George Frederick Handel, 1759; musicians (Commemoration) W – ELCA
- 29 Saint Martha, Virgin (W)
  - Mary, Martha, and Lazarus of Bethany (Commemoration) W
  - Olaf, King of Norway, martyr, 1030 (Commemoration) R – ELCA
- 30 Robert Barnes (martyr), confessor and martyr (Commemoration) R – LCMS
- 31 Joseph of Arimathea (Commemoration) W – LCMS

== August ==
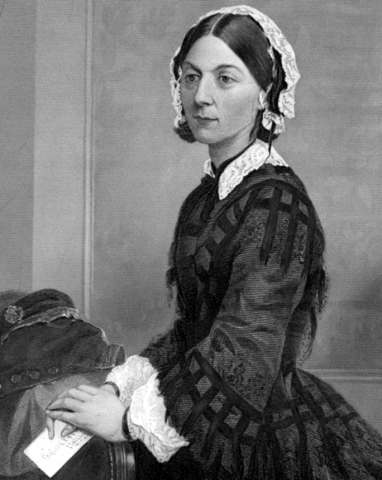
Florence Nightingale

- 1
- 2
- 3 Joanna, Mary, and Salome, myrrh-bearing women (Commemoration) W – LCMS
- 4
- 5
- 6 Transfiguration of Our Lord (W) - More commonly observed on the last Sunday after Epiphany
- 7
- 8 Dominic, priest, founder of the Order of Preachers (Dominicans), 1221 (Commemoration) W – ELCA
- 9
- 10 Lawrence, deacon, martyr 258 (Commemoration) R
- 11 Clare, Abbess of San Damiano, renewer of the Church, 1253 (Commemoration) W – ELCA
- 12
- 13 Florence Nightingale, 1910; Clara Maass, 1901; renewers of society (Commemoration) W – ELCA
- 14 Maximilian Kolbe, 1941; Kaj Munk, 1944; martyrs (Commemoration) R – ELCA
- 15 Mary, Mother of Our Lord

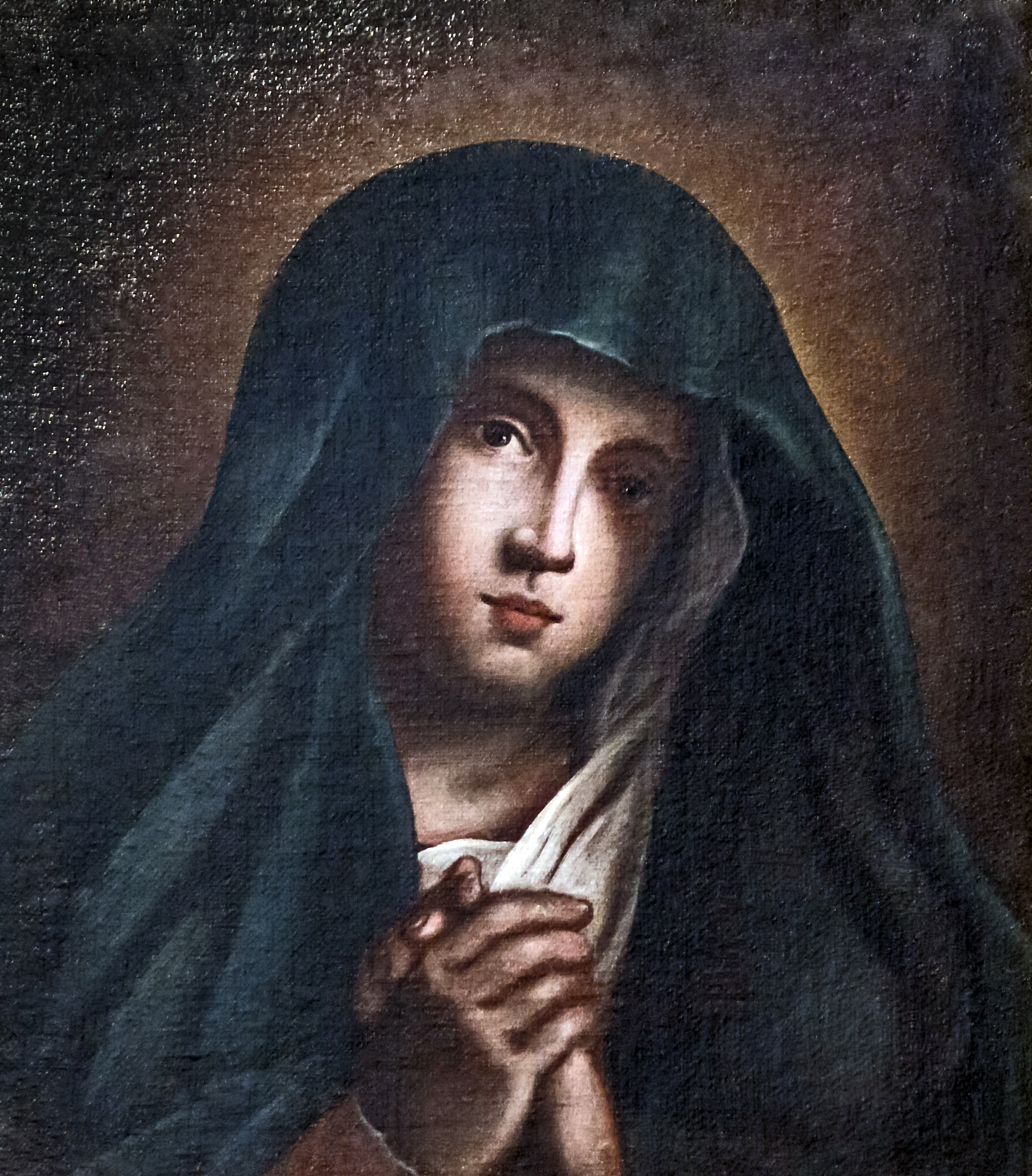
Mary, Mother of Our Lord

- 16 Isaac, patriarch (Commemoration) W – LCMS
- Leonard Kaiser, Theologian / Student of Martin Luther/ Martyred at Schärding on the Banks of the River Inn, Austria 1527
- 17 Johann Gerhard, theologian, 1637 (Commemoration) W – LCMS
- 18
- 19 Bernard, Abbot of Clairvaux, hymnwriter, theologian 1153 (Commemoration) W – LCMS
- 20 Bernard, Abbot of Clairvaux, hymnwriter, theologian, 1153 (Commemoration) W – ELCA
  - Samuel, prophet (Commemoration) R – LCMS
- 21
- 22
- 23
- 24 Bartholomew, Apostle (R)
- 25
- 26
- 27 Monica, mother of Augustine 387 (Commemoration) W – LCMS
- 28 Augustine, Bishop and Doctor, 430 (W)
  - Moses the Black, monk, martyr, c. 400 (Commemoration) R - ELCA
- 29 The Martyrdom of John the Baptist (R) – LCMS
- 30
- 31

== September ==
- 1 Joshua, prophet (Commemoration) R – LCMS
- 2 Nikolai Frederik Severin Grundtvig, bishop, renewer of the church, 1872 (Commemoration) W – ELCA
  - Hannah, matriarch (Commemoration) W – LCMS
- 3 Gregory the Great, Bishop of Rome, 604 (Commemoration) W – LCMS
- 4 Moses, prophet (Commemoration)) R – LCMS
- 5 Zechariah, prophet
  - Elizabeth, matriarch (Commemoration) W – LCMS
- 6
- 7
- 8 Nativity of Mary (W) - LCMS (19th century)
- 9 Peter Claver, priest, missionary to Colombia, 1654 (Commemoration) – ELCA
- 10
- 11
- 12
- 13 John Chrysostom, Bishop of Constantinople, 407 (Commemoration) W – ELCA
- 14 Holy Cross Day (R)
- 15
- 16 Cyprian, Bishop of Carthage, martyr, c. 258 (Commemoration) R
- 17 Hildegard, Abbess of Bingen, 1179 (Commemoration) W – ELCA
- 18 Dag Hammarskjöld, renewer of society, 1961 (Commemoration) W – ELCA

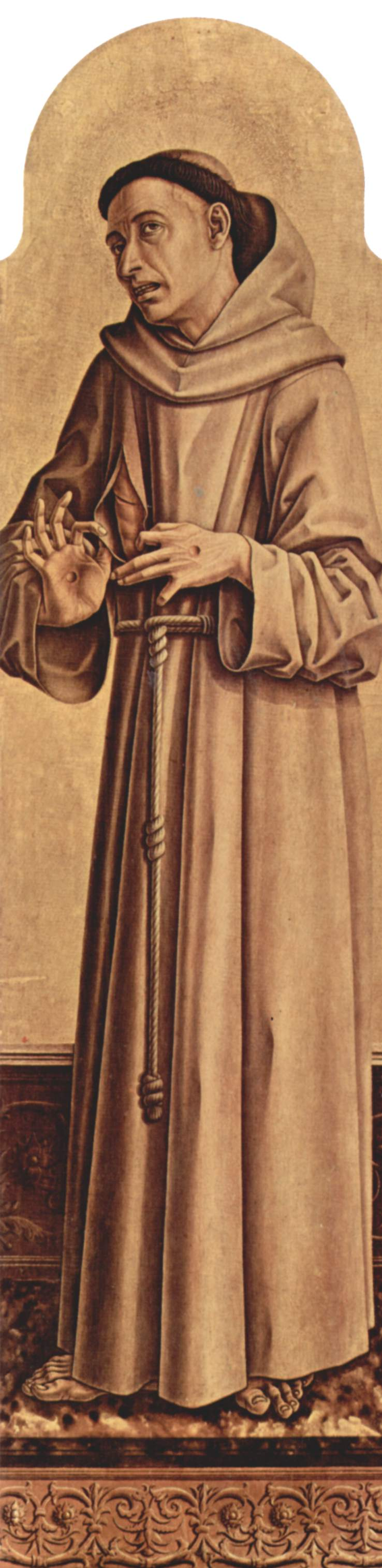
Carlo Crivelli, Francis of Assisi

- 19
- 20 Nelson Wesley Trout, bishop, 1996 (Commemoration) W – ELCA
- 21 Matthew, Apostle and Evangelist (R)
- 22 Maurice and Companions, Martyrs (R) - Historic
  - Jonah, prophet (Commemoration) R – LCMS
- 23
- 24
- 25
- 26
- 27
- 28
- 29 Michael and All Angels (W)
- 30 Jerome, translator, teacher, 420 (Commemoration) W

== October ==
- 1
- 2
- 3
- 4 Francis of Assisi, renewer of the church, 1226 (Commemoration) W – ELCA
  - Theodor Fliedner, renewer of society, 1864 (Commemoration) W – ELCA
- 5
- 6 William Tyndale, translator, martyr, 1536 (Commemoration) R – ELCA
- 7 Henry Melchior Muhlenberg, pastor in North America, 1787 (Commemoration) W
- 8
- 9 Abraham, patriarch (Commemoration) W – LCMS
- 10 Massie L. Kennard, renewer of the church, 1986 (Commemoration) W – ELCA
- 11 Phillip, deacon (Commemoration) W – LCMS
- 12
- 13
- 14
- 15 Teresa of Ávila, teacher, renewer of the church, 1582 (Commemoration) W – ELCA
- 16
- 17 Ignatius, Bishop of Antioch, martyr, c. 115 (Commemoration) R
- 18 Luke, Evangelist(R)
- 19
- 20
- 21
- 22
- 23 James of Jerusalem, brother of Jesus and martyr, c. 62 (Lesser Festival) R

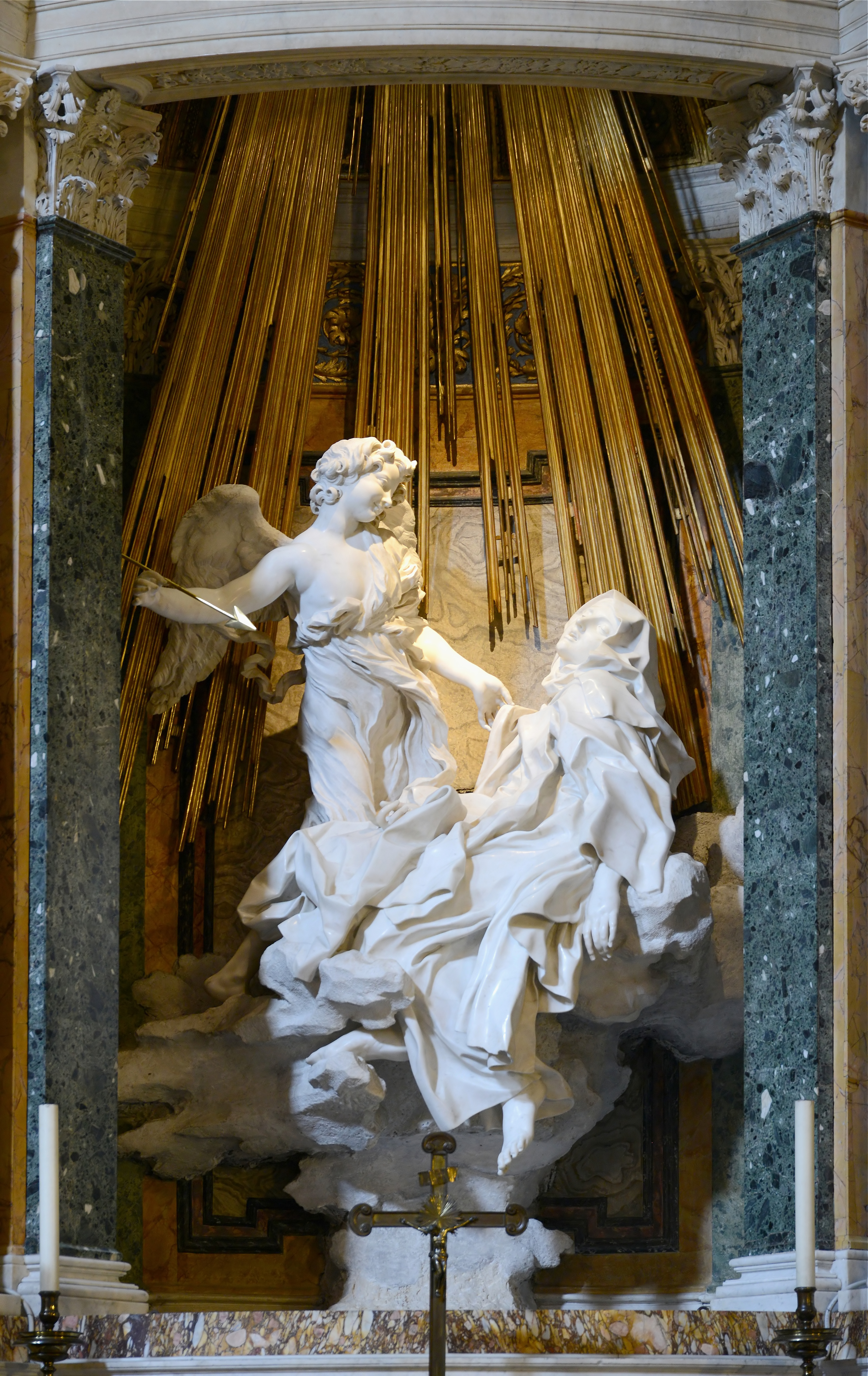
Gianlorenzo Bernini The Ecstasy of St. Teresa

- 24
- 25 Lydia, Dorcas (Tabitha), and Phoebe, faithful women (Commemoration) – LCMS
- 26 Philipp Nicolai, 1608; Johann Heermann, 1647; Paul Gerhardt, 1676; hymnwriters (Commemoration) W
- 27
- 28 Simon and Jude, Apostles(R)
- 29
- 30
- 31 Reformation Day (Lesser Festival) R

== November ==
- 1 All Saints' Day(W)
- 2 **Daniel Payne, teacher, 1893 (Commemoration) – ELCA [The Commemoration of the Faithful Departed - All Soul's Day]
- 3 Martín de Porres, renewer of society, 1639 (Commemoration) W – ELCA
- 4
- 5
- 6
- 7 John Christian Frederick Heyer, 1873; Bartholomaeus Ziegenbalg, 1719; Ludwig Ingwer Nommensen, 1918; missionaries (Commemoration) W – ELCA

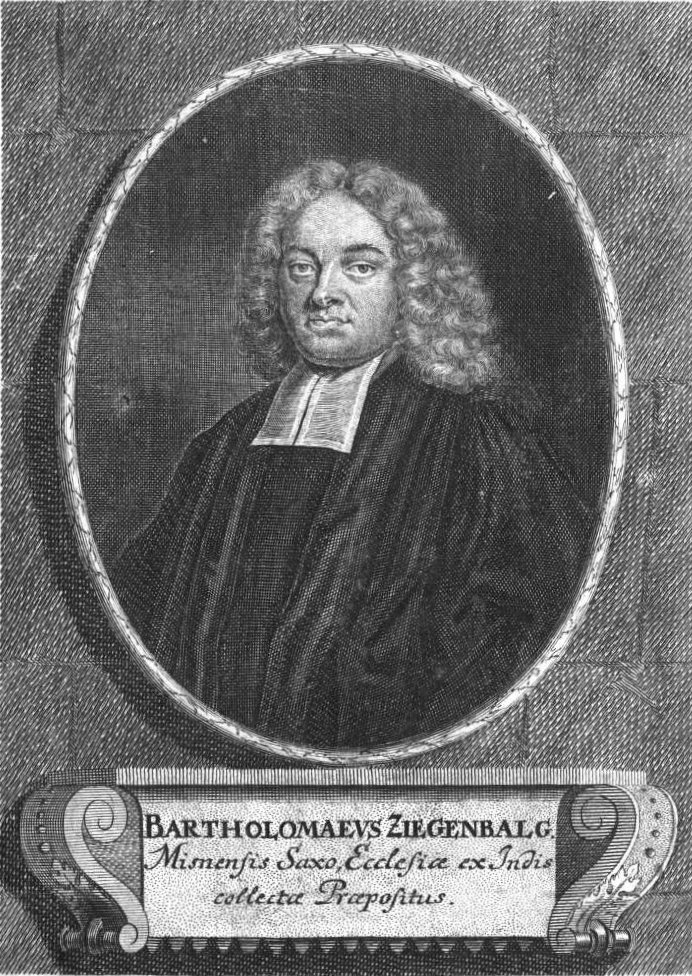
Bartholomaeus Ziegenbalg

- 8 Johann von Staupitz, priest, 1524 (Commemoration) W – LCMS
- 9 Martin Chemnitz, pastor and confessor, 1586 (Commemoration) W – LCMS
- 10
- 11 Martin of Tours, Bishop, 397 (W)
  - Søren Aabye Kierkegaard, teacher, 1855 (Commemoration) W – ELCA
- 12
- 13
- 14 Emperor Justinian, confessor, emperor of New Rome, 565 (Commemoration) W – LCMS
- 15
- 16
- 17 Elizabeth, renewer of society, 1231 (Commemoration) W – ELCA
- 18
- 19 Elizabeth of Hungary, 1231 (W) – LCMS
- 20
- 21
- 22
- 23 Clement, bishop of Rome, c. 100 (Commemoration) W
  - Miguel Agustín Pro, priest, martyr, 1927 (Commemoration) R – ELCA
- 24 Justus Falckner, 1723; Jehu Jones, 1852; William Passavant, 1894; pastors in North America (Commemoration) W – ELCA
- 25 Catherine of Alexandria, Martyr (R) - historic
  - Isaac Watts, hymnwriter, 1748 (Commemoration) W – ELCA
- 26
- 27
- 28
- 29 Noah, prophet (Commemoration) R – LCMS
- 30 Andrew, Apostle (R)

== December ==
- 1
- 2 Dorothy Kazel, Ita Ford, Maura Clarke and Jean Donovan, martyrs of El Salvador, 1980 (Commemoration) R - ELCA
- 3 Francis Xavier, missionary to Asia, 1552 (Commemoration) W – ELCA
- 4 John of Damascus, theologian and hymnwriter, c. 749 (Commemoration) W
- 5
- 6 Nicholas, bishop of Myra, c. 342 (Commemoration) W
- 7 Ambrose, bishop of Milan, 397 (Commemoration) W
- 8
- 9
- 10
- 11
- 12

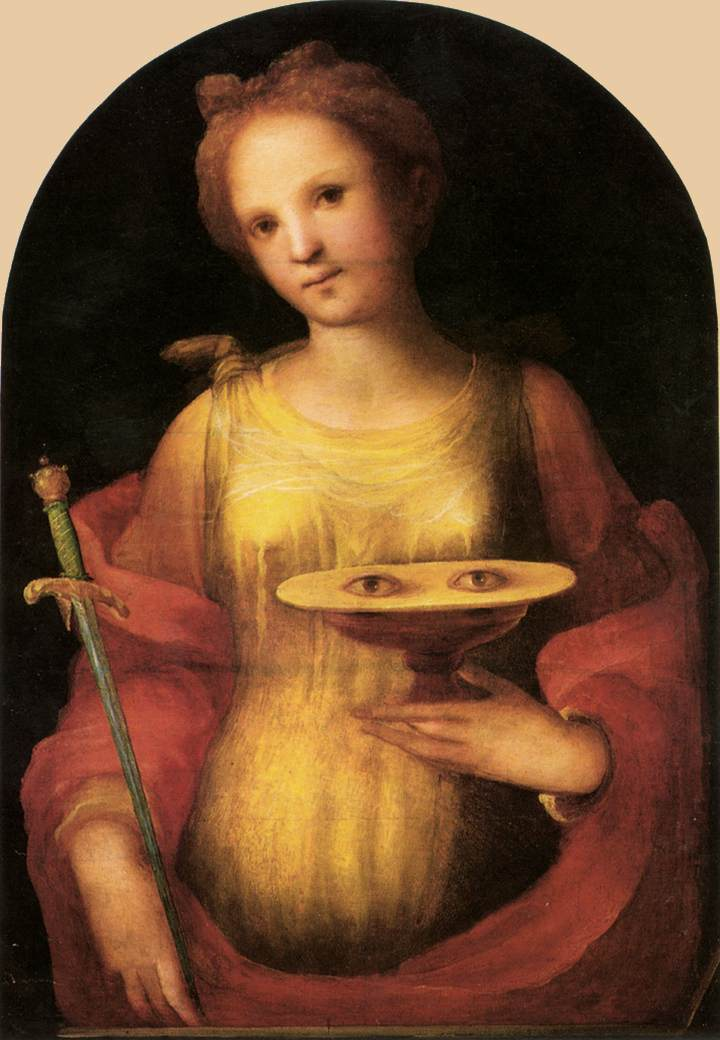
Domenico di Pace Beccafumi, Saint Lucy

- 13 Lucy, martyr, 304 (Commemoration) R
- 14 John of the Cross, renewer of the church, 1591 (Commemoration) W – ELCA
- 15
- 16
- 17 Daniel and the Three Young Men, prophets, (Commemoration) R – LCMS
- 18
- 19 Adam and Eve, patriarch and matriarch (Commemoration) W – LCMS
- 20 Katharina von Bora Luther, renewer of the church, 1552 (Commemoration) W
- 21 Thomas, Apostle(R) – LCMS
- 22
- 23
- 24 VIGIL OF THE NATIVITY OF OUR LORD (W)
- 25 NATIVITY OF OUR LORD (W)
- 26 Stephen, Deacon and Martyr (R)
- 27 John, Apostle and Evangelist (W)
- 28 The Holy Innocents, Martyrs (R)
- 29 Thomas of Canterbury, Martyr (R) - Historic
  - David, prophet (Commemoration) R – LCMS
- 30
- 31

== See also ==
- Moveable feast
- List of saints
- Liturgical calendar (Lutheran)

== Bibliography ==
- Inter-Lutheran Commission on Worship (1978). Lutheran Book of Worship. Minneapolis, MN: Augsburg Fortress Press. ISBN 9780800633301.
- Inter-Lutheran Commission on Worship (1978). Lutheran Book of Worship: Minister's Desk Edition. Minneapolis, MN: Augsburg Fortress Press. ISBN 978-9991472546.
- Evangelical Lutheran Church in America. Evangelical Lutheran Worship - Final Draft. Augsburg Fortress Press, 2006.
- Lutheran Church–Missouri Synod (1982). Lutheran Worship. St. Louis, MO: Concordia Publishing House. pp. 8–9. ISBN 978-0570010197.
- Lutheran Church–Missouri Synod (2006). Lutheran Service Book. St. Louis, MO: Concordia Publishing House. pp. x–xiii. ISBN 978-0-7586-1217-5.
  - "Commemorations - Church Year". The Lutheran Church–Missouri Synod.
  - "Feasts and Festivals - Church Year". The Lutheran Church–Missouri Synod.
- Philip H. Pfatteicher (1980). Festivals and Commemorations: Handbook to the Calendar in Lutheran Book of Worship. Minneapolis, MN: Augsburg Fortress Press. ISBN 978-0806617572.
