= Theodor Fliedner =

German Lutheran minister (1800–1864)

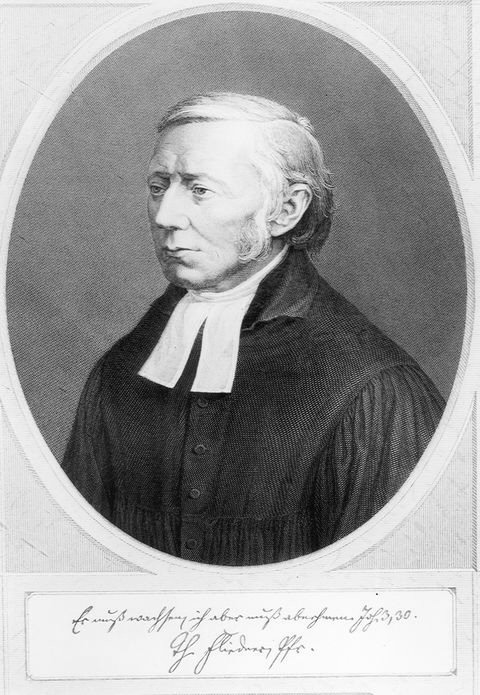
Theodor Fliedner

Theodor Fliedner (21 January 1800 – 4 October 1864) was a German Lutheran minister and founder of Lutheran deaconess training. In 1836, he and Friederike Fliedner founded the Kaiserswerther Diakonie, a hospital and deaconess training center. They and Caroline Bertheau, are regarded as the renewers of the apostolic deaconess ministry. Their work in nursing was pioneering for Florence Nightingale, who spent a few months in Kaiserswerth in 1850 and 1851.

== Background ==
Fliedner was born in Eppstein in Hesse, Germany. He was the son of a Lutheran minister, and studied theology at the University of Giessen and the University of Göttingen as well as at Herborn Academy, the theological seminary in Herborn. He was, for a time, a house teacher. In 1821 he assumed the pastorate in the poor municipality of Kaiserswerth (now in Düsseldorf). When the town could no longer support church and ministry due to an economic crisis, he undertook journeys to collect donations. Beginning in Westphalia, these travels also took him to the Netherlands and England.

== Career ==
In the Netherlands he became acquainted with the ancient church office of deaconess while spending time among the Moravian Church, which had revived the institution in 1745. In England he met with English social reformer, Elizabeth Fry, who demonstrated her work among her nation's impoverished and imprisoned people. He returned home not only with a large financial collection for his municipality but also with new ideas about social work among the disadvantaged. He began by working among inmates at the Düsseldorf Prison, preaching the Gospel and ministering to spiritual and physical needs. He walked to and from Düsseldorf every other Sunday until a regular prison chaplain was appointed. The German prisons were then in a very bad state; but those interested in their improvement banded together, and in 1826, Fliedner created the Rhenish-Westphalian Prison Society (Rheinisch-Westfälische Gefängnisgesellschaft). Fliedner realized that the first step must be toward looking after the prisoners on their release, and accordingly, in 1833, he opened at Kaiserswerth a refuge for discharged female convicts. To better support and teach Kaiserwerth's children, he founded a school in 1835 which became the venue for a women teachers' seminar (de:Lehrerinnenseminar).

=== Deaconess Training ===
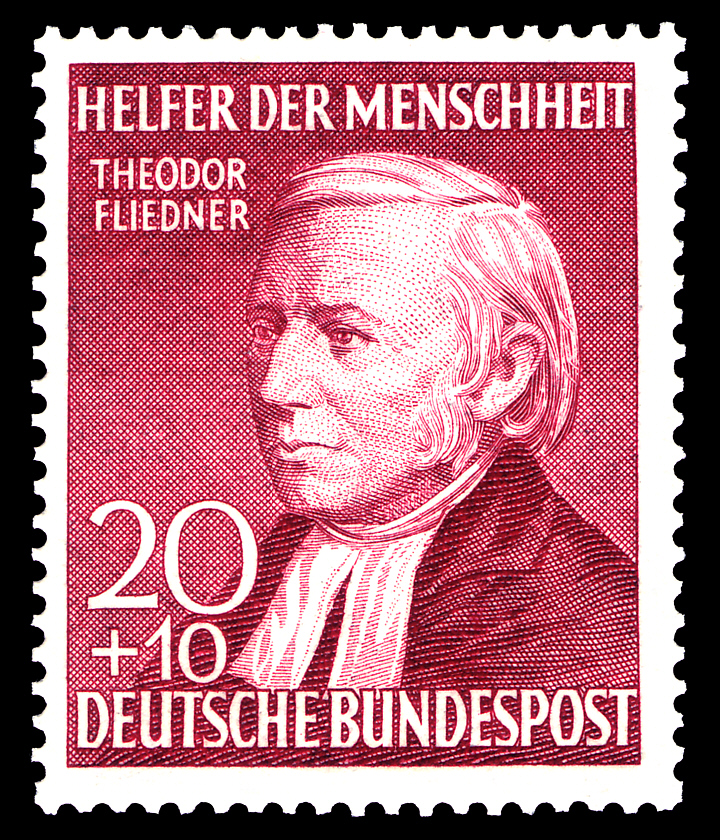
Pastor Theodor Fliedner. German social welfare stamp. 1952

In many cities, there were no hospitals at that time. Following somewhat the model of the early Christian Church's diaconate, incorporating ideas learned from Fry and the Mennonites, and applying his own thoughts, Fliedner developed a plan whereby young women would find and care for the needy sick. For this, he needed to create Kaiserswerther Diakonie, an institute where women could learn both theology and nursing skills. He opened the hospital and deaconess training center in Kaiserswerth on 13 October 1836. Deaconesses took vows to care for their poor and sick charges, but they could leave their work and return to outside life if they so chose. Between 1836 and 1847 Fliedner also opened an infants' school and one for their teachers, a girls' orphanage, and a women's asylum.

Gertrud Reichardt was the first deaconess commissioned by the new school. Florence Nightingale trained there as a nurse in 1850. One of the associated Kaiserwerth professional schools was later named in her honor. Two other noted student were the Swedish Maria Cederschiöld, a pioneer of nursing in her country, and Louise Conring, the first Danish deaconess and founder of Diakonissestiftelsen.

After his wife, Friederike, died in 1842, he found a new life companion (and important employee) in Caroline Bertheau. They opened institutes for the diaconate in 1844 in Dortmund and in 1847 in Berlin with the support of King Frederick William IV of Prussia, and his wife Queen Elizabeth. Fliedner's attention became completely focused on this aspect of the ministry and in 1849 he resigned his pastorate and turned completely to working with the diaconate, including increasing activity abroad, founding "mother houses" across central and Eastern Europe, and as far as Jerusalem. Fliedner's movement has been cited as the model for the Inner Mission movement which Johann Hinrich Wichern developed. In 1855 Fliedner received the degree of Doctor of Theology from the University of Bonn, in recognition of his practical activities.

== Legacy ==
Because of these efforts, deaconess institutes arose in Paris, Oslo, Strasbourg, Utrecht, and elsewhere. By the time of his death in 1864, there were 30 motherhouses and 1,600 deaconesses worldwide. By the middle of the 20th century, there were over 35,000 deaconesses serving in parishes, schools, hospitals, and prisons throughout the world.

A sign of the international respect Fliedner garnered is that his most famous pupil came from outside Germany. English nursing reformer Florence Nightingale first visited Diaconate in 1850. She was impressed by their devotion and noted most of the deaconesses were of peasant origin. She spent three months in the facility in 1851. Today, one of Düsseldorf's hospitals (Florence-Nightingale-Krankenhaus) bears her name.

He is commemorated as a renewer of society in the Calendar of Saints of the Evangelical Lutheran Church in America on 4 October and by the Evangelical Church in Germany on 5 October.

== Selected works ==
Fliedner's writings were almost all of a practical, rather than theological nature. Included were:

- Kollektenreise nach Holland und England (1831)
- Liederbuch für Kleinkinderschulen (1842)
- Kaiserswerther Volkskalender (from 1842), a yearly almanac of Kaiserswerther
- Armen- und Krankenfreund (from 1849), with information from his various institutions
- Buch der Märtyrer und anderer Glaubenszeugen der evangelischen Kirche (1850)
- Kurze Geschichte der Entstehung der ersten evangelischen Liebesanstalten in Kaiserswerth (1856)

== See also ==
- Fliedner University of Applied Sciences, a modern institution which draws upon Kaiserswerther Diakonie for its inspiration

== Other sources ==
- Calder, Jean McKinlay (1971) The Story of Nursing ( Methuen; 5th edition)
- Kruczek, Dietmar (1999) German Theodor Fliedner: Mein Leben, für das Leben. Eine Biographie über den Gründer der Kaiserswerther Diakonie (Neukirchen-Vluyn: Aussaat)
- Sticker, Anna (1989) German Theodor und Friederike Fliedner (R. Brockhaus Bildbiographien)
- Wentz, Abdel Ross (1936) Fliedner the Faithful, Biography of Theodore Fliedner (The Board of Publication of the United Lutheran Church in America)
- Winkworth, Catherine (2008) Life of Pastor Fliedner of Kaiserwerth (1867) (Kessinger Publishing, LLC.)
- Worman, J. H. (1879). "Fliedner, Theodor" . In Ripley, George; Dana, Charles A. (eds.). The American Cyclopædia.
