= Renewer of Society =

Renewer of Society is a title given by the Lutheran Book of Worship to selected individuals commemorated in its Calendar of Saints whom it sees as having contributed dramatically to the development and vitality of society. The individuals specifically designated by one or more Lutheran churches with this term include:

- Martin Luther King Jr., commemorated on January 15
- Harriet Tubman, commemorated on March 10
- Sojourner Truth, commemorated on March 10
- Toyohiko Kagawa, commemorated on April 23
- Florence Nightingale, commemorated on August 13
- Clara Maass, commemorated on August 13
- Dag Hammarskjöld, commemorated on September 18.
- Theodor Fliedner, commemorated on October 4
- Martin de Porres, commemorated on November 3.
- Elizabeth of Hungary, commemorated on November 17.
