= Massie (surname) =

Massie is a surname sometimes derived from the Scottish clan name Matheson. Notable people with the surname include:

- Alan Massey (born 1953), British admiral
- Alex Massie (disambiguation), multiple people
- Allan Massie (1938–2026), Scottish journalist and novelist
- Bob Massie (born 1947), Australian cricketer
- Edward Massie (1619–1674), English Parliament soldier in the English Civil War
- Elizabeth Massie, American author
- Eugene C. Massie (1861–1924), Virginia politician
- Hugh Massie (1854–1938), Australian cricketer
- Jack Massie (1890–1966), Australian cricketer
- John Massie (1842–1925), British theologian and politician
- Joseph Massie (economist) (died 1784), British political economist
- Joseph Massie (American football) (1871–1922), American football player and coach
- Matthew Massie (born 1985), American professional wrestler and part of The Young Bucks with brother Nicholas
- Nathaniel Massie (1763–1813), American early Ohio Country frontier surveyor
- Nicholas Massie (born 1989), American professional wrestler and part of The Young Bucks with brother Matthew
- Paul Massie (1932–2011), Canadian actor and academic
- Peter Massie (1767–1840), Scottish planter
- Robert K. Massie (1929–2019), American historian
- Robert Kinloch Massie (born 1956), American author
- Robert Lee Massie (1941–2001), American convicted murderer executed in California
- Suzanne Massie (1931–2025), American-Russian historian
- Thalia Fortescue Massie (1911–1963), the figure at the centre of a Hawaiian murder trial
- Thomas Massie (burgess) (1675–1732), Colonial Virginia politician
- Thomas Massie (planter) (1747–1834), Continental Army officer
- Thomas Massie (born 1971), American politician
- Thomas Leeke Massie (1802–1898), admiral in the British Navy
- William Massie (burgess) (1718–1751), Colonial Virginia politician

== See also ==
- Masih (surname)
- Massey (surname)
- Massey (disambiguation)
