= Friederike Fliedner =

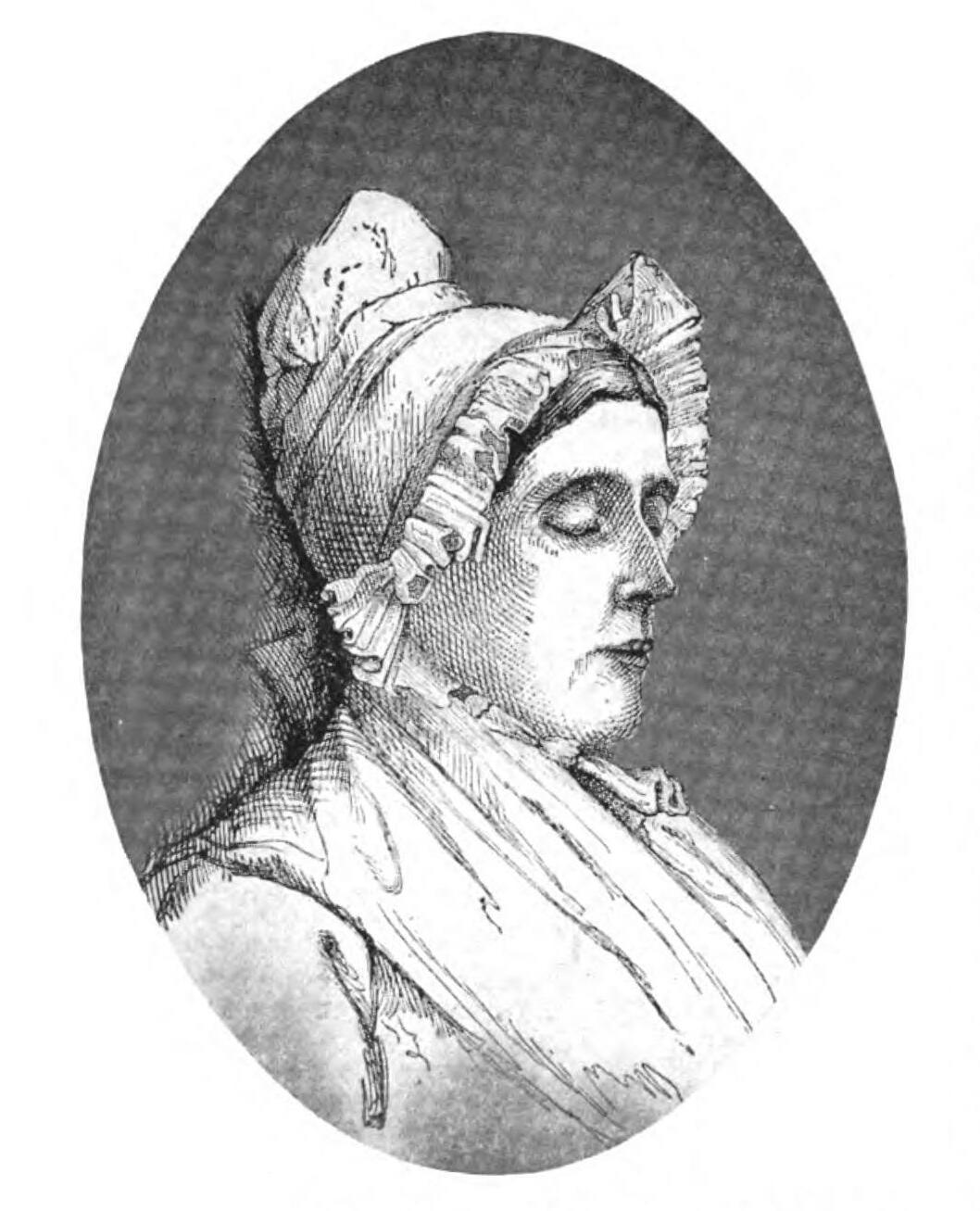
- Born: Frederike Münster; January 25, 1800; Braunfels
- Died: April 22, 1842 (aged 42); Kaiserswerth
- Occupation: teacher
- Known for: co-founding the Deaconess House
- Spouse: Theodor Fliedner

Friederike Fliedner or Frederike Münster Fliedner (January 25, 1800 – April 22, 1842) was a German nurse and teacher. She, her husband and Caroline Bertheau, are regarded as the renewers of the apostolic deaconess ministry. Their work in nursing created pioneers including Florence Nightingale.

== Life ==
Fliedner was born in 1800 in Braunfels. She was the first of seven children of Louise Hartmann who was a maid and her husband Andreas Münster (1775–1849) who was a teacher. While Fliedner was sixteen her mother died in 1816. Friederike had to take over the household with six younger siblings. When her father remarried in 1817, she continued to help her stepmother with the housework.

During this time, Fliedner's friendship with the Basel missionaries Goebel and Traub and her experience of their active charity had a formative religious influence on her.

She trained as a teacher for neglected children and worked from 1826 to January 1828 in Düsselthal as a teacher at the Protestant rescue institution for orphans, which had been founded in 1822 in the former Trappist abbey by Count Adalbert von der Recke-Volmerstein.

Around 1823, she met Theodor Fliedner, the founder and secretary of the Rhenish-Westphalian Prison Society. He proposed to her by letter including the condition that she acknowledged him as the master, and the importance of his Prison Society They married on April 15, 1828, in Oberbiel near Wetzlar. Fliedner assisted her husband in Kaiserswerth with his work. After initially allowing others she assumed the role of superior in 1837 at the newly founded (1836) Deaconess House in Kaiserswerth. It was acknowledged that the deaconess was always subordinate to a man (the priest) and this was later conformed at the first transnational convention of motherhouses in 1861. However Fliedner stated that it required "obedience […] but not menial fear". She would change her husband's instructions because somethings "can only happen under the eyes of a woman."

Fliedner and her husband developed the concept of the Deaconess Motherhouse. She was responsible for training the deaconesses as nurses at the motherhouse. From Kaiserswerth, they spread the idea of the deaconess and the trained nurse throughout Germany. Fliedner believed that the spiritual aspect should be completely separated from the nursing duties and that the nurses should be exclusively physical caregivers. However, she was unable to persuade her husband.

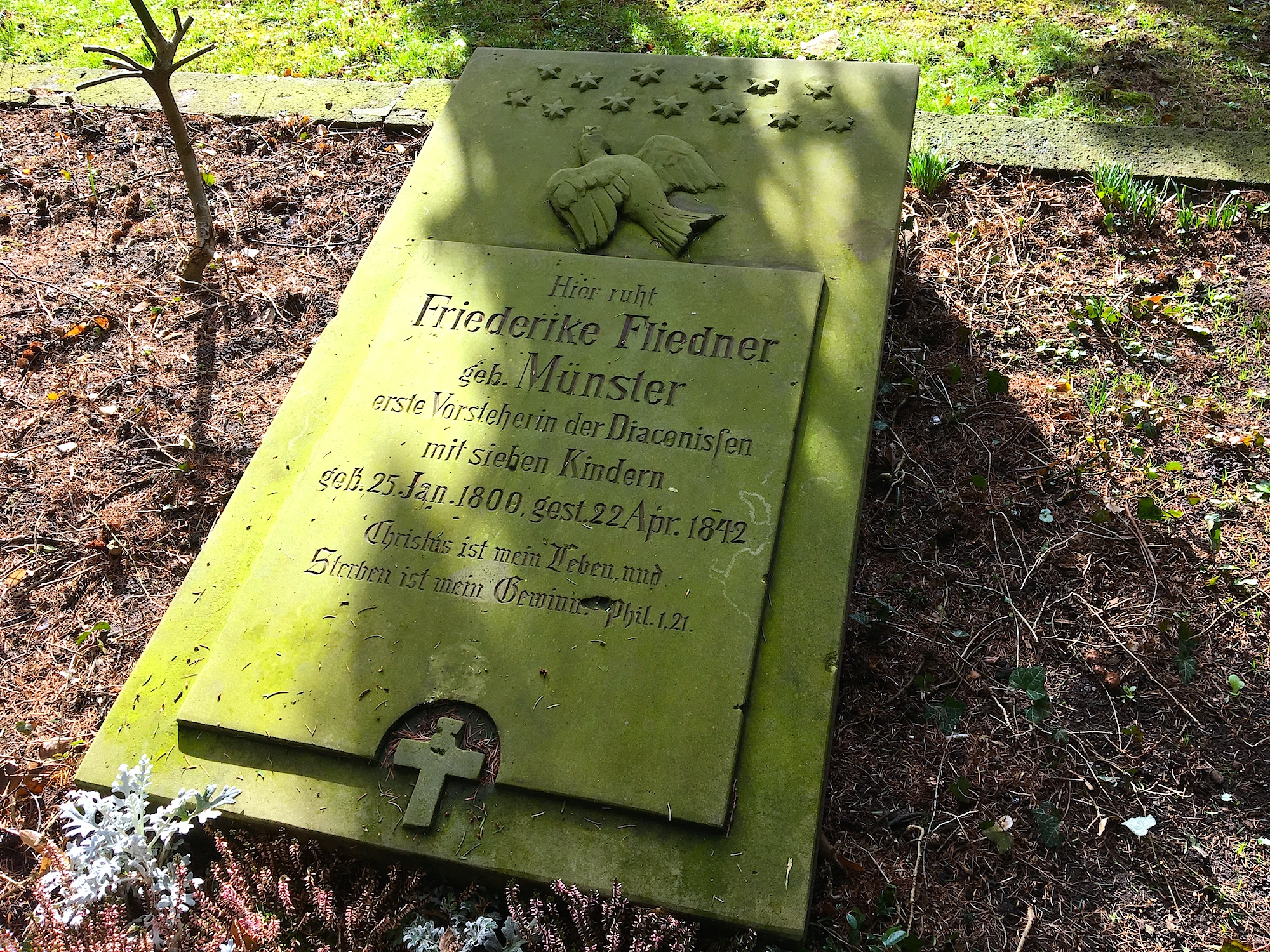
her grave

On October 13, 1836 Theodor founded the first deaconess house of the modern era in Kaiserswerth, the Kaiserswerth Deaconess Institute . Friederike became the first superior. The newly established training for Protestant nurses was based on the programmatic writings of the Rhenish theologian Friedrich Klönne. The new institution offered unmarried women nursing training recognized as a church office, as assistants to a male physician or pastor.

Fliedner died in Kaiserswerth on 22 April 1842 while giving birth to her eleventh child. She and the child were buried together.
