= Massei =

Massei is an Italian surname. Notable persons with that surname include:

- Joe Massei (1899 – 1971), American gangster of Italian-Irish origins
- Girolamo Massei (c. 1530 – c. 1614), Italian Mannerist painter active mostly in Rome
- Oscar Massei (born 1934), Argentine retired professional football

== See also ==
- Masei
- Massi (disambiguation)
- Mazzei, surname
- Villa Massei, hunting lodge and garden in Tuscany
