= Mazzei =

Mazzei is an Italian surname. Notable people with the surname include:

- Andrew Mazzei (1887–1975), British art director
- Barbara Mazzei, Italian archaeologist
- Francesco Mazzei (born 1973), Italian chef
- Frank Mazzei (1912–1977), American politician from Pennsylvania
- Isa Mazzei, American screenwriter, author, and film producer
- Júlio Mazzei (1930–2009), Brazilian soccer coach
- Mike Mazzei (born 1965), American politician from Oklahoma
- Philip Mazzei (1730–1816), Italian physician
- Santo Mazzei (born 1953), Sicilian mafioso

== See also ==
- Massei, surname
- Mazzei v. Commissioner, 1974 lawsuit
- Mazzi, surname
- SS Filipp Mazzei, ship
