= Live en studio =

Studio album by Crampe en masse
- Released: 2001
- Recorded: May 22 – June 7, 2001
- Genre: Comedy
- Length: 60:00
- Label: Les disques Crampe en masse
- Producer: Crampe en masse

Crampe en masse chronology
Chansons drôles de d'autres (2000)	Live en studio (2001)	Crampe en masse et le hot dog géant (2003)

Live en studio is the fourth album by québécois comedy duo Crampe en masse, and the first on their own label Les disques Crampe en masse.

== Track listing ==
All tracks written by Crampe en masse (Mathieu Gratton and Ghyslain Dufresne).

No.	Title	Length
1.	"La chanson qui va-vite"	1:46
2.	"Hommage à Aunt Jemima"	2:23
3.	"Berceuse pour les pas fins"	2:36
4.	"Lâche pas la patate" (with Yelo Molo)	2:37
5.	"De retour après la pause"	1:29
6.	"J'me sens pas fraîche"	2:16
7.	"Viens dans ma Chevette"	3:49
8.	"Pute, pute, pute St-Hubert B.B.Q."	1:40
9.	"Un nain c'est p'tit"	3:49
10.	"La chasse"	3:08
11.	"La guignolée"	2:10
12.	"Nowel Plate"	3:30
13.	"La crème glacée" (tracks 15-50)
