= Roule-toi par terre! =

Studio album by Crampe en masse
- Released: 1999
- Recorded: August 12 – September 7, 1999
- Genre: Comedy
- Length: 49:30
- Label: Les Éditions Leïla
- Producer: Crampe en masse

Crampe en masse chronology
Crampe en Masse (1998)	Roule-toi par terre! (1999)	Chansons drôles de d'autres (2000)

Roule-toi par terre is the second album by francophone Quebecer comedy duo Crampe en masse.

== Track listing ==
No.	Title	Artist(s)	Length
1.	"Le fermier déprimé"	Mathieu Gratton	3:01
2.	"Les fefis sont fins"	Ghyslain Dyfresne	2:30
3.	"Chez Ben on se bourre la bédaine"	Ghyslain Dufresne	4:15
4.	"La balade de Réal Samson"	Mathieu Gratton	3:03
5.	"J'aime pas ta face"	Mathieu Gratton	2:31
6.	"De retour après la pause"	C.E.M.	0:35
7.	"Maman"	Mathieu Gratton	3:45
8.	"Pot-Sicle"	Mathieu Gratton	3:27
9.	"La toune d'été"	C.E.M.	2:59
10.	"Les enfants ne sont pas tous beaux"	Ghyslain Dufresne	3:21
11.	"La onzième toune"	Ghyslain Dufresne	0:49
12.	"Moi j'mange"	Angèle Arsenault	2:42
13.	"Le p'tit Nou"	Mathieu Gratton	3:14
14.	"La toune de Noël"	C.E.M.	3:02
15.	"Medley Noël (bonus)"		10:25
