= Crampe en masse et le hot dog géant =

Studio album by Crampe en masse
- Released: 2003
- Genre: Comedy
- Length: 59:30
- Label: Les disques Crampe en masse
- Producer: Crampe en masse

Crampe en masse chronology
Live en studio (2001)	Crampe en masse et le hot dog géant (2003)

Crampe en masse et le hot dog géant is the fifth album by québécois comedy duo Crampe en masse, released in 2003. It is the first Crampe en masse album containing comedy sketches as well as some songs.

== Track listing ==
All tracks written by Crampe en masse (Mathieu Gratton and Ghyslain Dufresne).

No.	Title	Length
1.	"Ô Canada"	1:18
2.	"La finale de la coupe Grey"	2:50
3.	"Tranche de vie #1"	0:13
4.	"L'accouchement de Patricia Paquin"	2:51
5.	"Pubs #1"	3:12
6.	"Les petites affaires que ma blonde fait qui font que ça la rend spéciale"	2:41
7.	"Le corps humain"	0:20
8.	"Les Olympiques"	4:16
9.	"Message gouvernemental"
10.	"La St-Jean-Batiste"	2:50
11.	"Pubs #2"	3:03
12.	"Vous avez un nouveau message"	0:42
13.	"Maudit BS"	2:24
14.	"Les aventures de Fernand..."	2:22
15.	"Tranche de vie #2"	0:16
16.	"Le coup de téléphone"	1:25
17.	"Les aéroports"	3:55
18.	"Remessage gouvernemental"	0:28
19.	"Chez le Dentiste"	2:04
20.	"Mc Dônale"	1:45
21.	"Vous avez un autre nouveau message"	0:27
22.	"L'halloween"	3:06
23.	"Pubs #3"	2:26
24.	"Tranche de vie #3"	0:21
25.	"Le tueur de clowns"	3:37
26.	"La course"	1:10
27.	"Pubs #4"	2:07
28.	"Le temps des fêtes"	3:54
