= Massi (surname) =

Massi is an Italian surname. Notable people with the surname include:

- Charles Massi (1952–2010), Central African politician
- Elisabeth Massi Fritz (born 1967), Swedish lawyer
- Emidio Massi (1922–2016), Italian politician
- Enrico Massi (1897-1923), Italian aviator
- Eugenio Massi (1875–1944), Italian Catholic missionary
- Jeri Massi (born 1960), American author
- Maria Massi Dakake, Islamic intellectual historian
- Nick Massi (1927–2000), American singer
- Riccardo Massi, Italian operatic tenor
- Robert Massi (born 1987), Swedish footballer
- Rodolfo Massi (born 1965), Italian cyclist
- Souad Massi (born 1972), Algerian singer
- Sousan Massi (born 1989), Swedish tennis player
- Stelvio Massi (1929–2004), Italian film director
- Valentina Massi (born 1983), Italian model
