= Crampe en masse =

Crampe en masse is a Québécois comedy duo composed of Mathieu Gratton and Ghyslain Dufresne, who were active from 1998 to 2005.

Their first album sold 30,000 copies, while their second sold more than 15,000 copies and won the 2000 Félix Award for Humoristic album of the year.

== Discography ==
- Crampe en Masse
- Roule-toi par terre!
- Chansons drôles de d'autres
- Live en studio
- Crampe en masse et le hot-dog géant
