= Crampe en Masse (album) =

Studio album by Crampe en masse
- Released: 1998
- Recorded: February 18–March 4, 1998
- Genre: Comedy
- Length: 41:36
- Label: Les Éditions Leïla

Crampe en masse chronology
Crampe en Masse (1998)	Roule-toi par terre! (1999)

Crampe en Masse is the first album by the Québécois comedy duo Crampe en masse.

== Track listing ==
No.	Title	Artist(s)	Length
1.	"Motel California"	Mathieu Gratton	2:09
2.	"L'Agrès"	Mathieu Gratton	3:10
3.	"Berceuse pour les pas fins"	Ghyslain Dufresne	2:17
4.	"De retour après la pause"	C.E.M.	0:25
5.	"Clopin-Clopan"	Ghyslain Dufresne	2:47
6.	"Je suis l'opinion de Georges"	Ghyslain Dufresne	3:47
7.	"Los Malvaviscos"	Mathieu Gratton	2:04
8.	"Fais pas ça"	Ghyslain Dufresne	3:30
9.	"Objet perdu"	Mathieu Gratton	1:51
10.	"R-monium"	Ghyslain Dufresne	3:11
11.	"Les Pretzels"	Mathieu Gratton	2:11
12.	"Le divorce"	Mathieu Gratton	3:44
13.	"Maudite boisson"	Mathieu Gratton	2:04
14.	"Hommage à Lucien Boyer"	Lucien Boyer/Mathieu Gratton	3:38
15.	"Chanson connue"	C.E.M.	4:55
