= Massie Variety Store =

- U.S. National Register of Historic Places
- Location within Illinois
- Location: 110 S. Main St., New Canton, Illinois
- Coordinates: 39°38′12″N 91°5′48″W
- Area: less than one acre
- Built: c. 1850
- NRHP reference No.: 04000864
- Added to NRHP: August 20, 2004

The Massie Variety Store is a historic commercial building located at 110 South Main Street in New Canton, Illinois. John Webb built the two-story brick Italianate building between 1848 and 1850 as a mercantile store. Webb sold the building to Amos Morey, who added Melville D. Massie as a partner; by 1872, Massie had become the store's only owner. The store became one of the largest in the region by the 1890s, and it had taken on other roles in the community. An opera house operated on the upper story from 1865 until the 1900s, and Massie served as an agent for local farmers who traded their products along the Chicago, Burlington and Quincy Railroad. Massie's son Harry began renting the storefront in 1918; in the following decades, it served as a drug store, ice cream parlor, grocery store, and post office before closing for good in 1948. Roger Dudley purchased the building from the Massie family in 1962 and converted it to a toy store; his business, later an antique store, operated until the 1980s.

The store was added to the National Register of Historic Places on August 20, 2004.
