= Eugene C. Massie =

American politician

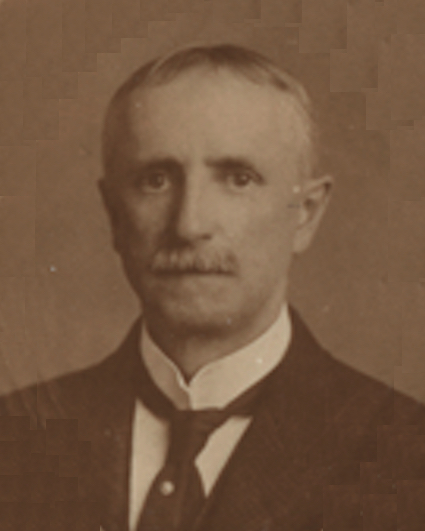

Member of the Virginia House of Delegates from Richmond City
- In office January 10, 1906 – January 12, 1910
- Preceded by: S. L. Kelley
- Succeeded by: John S. Harwood

Personal details
- Born: Eugene Carter Massie; May 27, 1861 Orange, Virginia, U.S.
- Died: April 4, 1924 (aged 62) Richmond, Virginia, U.S.
- Party: Democratic
- Spouse: Laura Roy Ellerson

Eugene Carter Massie (May 27, 1861 – April 4, 1924) was an American politician who served in the Virginia House of Delegates.

== Military service ==
Massie served for many years in the Virginia National Guard. From 1906 to 1910, he was Chief of Staff to Governor Claude A. Swanson, holding the rank of colonel.

== Sons of the American Revolution ==
Massie was an active member of the Virginia Society of the Sons of the American Revolution (Virginia SAR). He served as President of the Virginia Society from 1922 to 1924. He remained involved in the society until his death.
