= Alex Massie =

Alex Massie may refer to:

- Alex Massie (footballer) (1906–1977), Scottish footballer
- Alex Massie (journalist) (born 1974), Scottish journalist and commentator
- Alex Massie (snowboarder) (born 1995), Canadian para-snowboarder
