= Massey =

Massey may refer to:

== Places ==
=== Canada ===
- Massey, Ontario
- Massey Island, Nunavut

=== New Zealand ===
- Massey, New Zealand, an Auckland suburb

=== United States ===
- Massey, Alabama
- Massey, Iowa
- Massey, Maryland

== People ==
- Massey (surname)

== Education ==
- Massey College, affiliated with the University of Toronto
- Massey University, New Zealand
- Massey High School, in Auckland, New Zealand

== Other uses ==
- Massey Energy, an American coal-producing company
- USS Massey (DD-778), a US Navy destroyer
- Massey Brothers, a British coachbuilder based in Pemberton, Wigan, purchased by Northern Counties in 1967
- Massey product, a cohomology operation of higher order generalizing the cup product
- Massey Ferguson, an American heavy equipment company
- An alternative reading of Masei, the final parashah of the Book of Numbers

== See also ==
- Massee (surname)
- Massey (surname)
- Massie (surname)
- Massie (disambiguation)
