= Joseph Massey sen. =

Australian musician and choir conductor (1827–1900)

Joseph Richard Massey (July 1827 – 14 February 1900), referred to in his lifetime as Joseph Massey sen., was an Australian musician and founder of a family of musicians, best known as church organists.

== History ==
Massey was born in London, a son of Sarah Massey and Joseph Massey, a cabinetmaker, who emigrated to Sydney as free-settlers on the ship Richard Reynolds, arriving 14 August 1833 with their children Elizabeth, Sarah, James, Bass, and Joseph, the subject of this article.

He was engaged in business as a tailor in Mudgee, New South Wales around the year 1875, and while in that town was choirmaster of the Wesleyan church and conductor of the town's philharmonic society. The family left for Sydney for the sons' musical careers.

He became conductor of Sydney's first philharmonic society and the Sydney Choral Society, which met at the Sydney School of Arts, (Note: Charles S. Packer, composer of The Crown of Thorns oratorio, was accompanist. This is one of the few articles that credit Massey with five sons: Joseph, Arthur, Edward, James and Thomas.) and produced the well-known oratorios Messiah and Judas Maccabaeus and others. He was choir master at St John's Anglican Cathedral in Parramatta. In later years he played double bass with an orchestra at St Thomas's Church, North Sydney, where his son Joseph Massey jun. was organist.

He died at his residence, 347 Bourke Street, Darlinghurst, and his remains were interred at the Waverley Cemetery. Four sons and two grandsons, Harold and Hilton, were present at the funeral.

== Family ==
Massey married Mary Patrick (c. 1835–1898) in Sydney on 21 June 1853. They had one daughter and four sons, all musicians:

- Joseph Massey jun. (1855 – 30 May 1943) was organist at Mudgee before moving to Sydney, where he was a foundation member of the Sydney College of Music and organist for St Thomas's Church, North Sydney for 23 years, then 22 years at St Andrew's Cathedral, Sydney. He retired in 1923. John Antill wrote Elegy on a theme by former cathedral organist Joseph Massey in 1966. He married Eliza Jane Gresty (died February 1922) on 20 March 1879. Their children include:

- Ronald, Trevor and Leonard enlisted with the 1st AIF in 1915. Leonard was killed at Gallipoli. Trevor Marsh Massey (born c. May 1897) was wounded 1917 and (seriously) in 1918; discharged 1919. Ronald Edward Massey (c. July 1889 – 17 February 1968) was promoted lieutenant, awarded MM.
- Victor Roy Massey ( – ) was music master at Scots College in 1943 and organist and choirmaster at All Saints Church, Woollahra from 1920, was organist at St Mark's Church, Darling Point, but dismissed in 1944. He was also a composer and author of the Austral method of chanting.

- Arthur Massey (1861 – 10 August 1950) was musical director of St John's Church, Glebe, St Clement's Church, Mosman and St Peter's Church, Neutral Bay. He married Mary Magdalene "May" Bernasconi on 31 December 1881.

- Noel Massey was organist at St Luke's Church, Concord and the Congregational Church, Manly in 1936.

- Edward John Massey (1866–1941), "by far the most accomplished of these talented brothers", was organist at All Saints Cathedral in Goulburn, then exchanged it for the Woollahra Presbyterian Church in 1895 in order to be closer to his teaching commitments in Sydney. He was organist at Hoskins Memorial Church, Lithgow in 1928–1930. and St John's church, Mudgee from 1935.
- (Alfred) James Massey (1868 – 15 August 1949) left for Gisborne, New Zealand. His membership in the family has been overlooked or discounted in many reports. He was music teacher and organist of St Andrew's Church, Gisborne, and captain of Gisborne Cricket Club in 1900.
- Thomas Henry Massey (1871 – 15 November 1946) was a musician and published composer. At age 18 he conducted a choir of 50 voices in Sydney and later toured New Zealand with an opera company. In 1894 he accepted a position with the Presbyterian church at Woollahra, but the following year exchanged it for All Saints Cathedral at Goulburn with his brother Edward. He was organist of All Saints' Cathedral, Bathurst 1898–1908 He had a month as Sydney's City Organist, succeeding Auguste Wiegand in March 1901. He was organist of the Presbyterian Church and St Paul's Church in Lismore, besides conducting the Lismore Philharmonic Society and several of the town's choirs in the town 1910–1919. He succeeded Edward King as organist and choirmaster at Christ Church cathedral, Newcastle in 1919, serving until November 1946. Massey married Hester "Tess" Edmunds on 1 February 1899. They had five daughters.
- Muriel May Massey (1885–1964) married Robert Forbes-Young (died 1952) on 18 April 1911.

There is no reason to believe the English organist Roy Massey is a relation.
