= Massie L. Kennard =

African American Lutheran pastor

Massie L. Kennard (1918 – 1986) was an African-American Lutheran pastor who would later become secretary for program personnel for the Lutheran Church in America's Board of American Missions.

A native of Chicago, Illinois, Kennard was a major figure in championing ethnic and racial inclusiveness in the former Lutheran Church in America. Ordained in 1958, he served the church in various staff positions, including director for Minority Concerns of the Division for Mission in North America.

He served as the pastor of two Lutheran congregations. In 1972 he became the director for special need ministries. In 1977, he took the position as the director for racial/ethnic ministries. He remained in that position until his death in 1986.

He is commemorated in the Calendar of Saints of the Evangelical Lutheran Church in America as one of the renewers of the church on October 10.
