= J. C. Massee =

Jasper Cortenus Massee (November 1871 – March 27, 1965) was a leading fundamentalist Baptist in the early 20th century. As a leader of the more moderate fundamentalist Baptists in the Northern Baptist Convention (NBC), his efforts towards reconciliation contributed to compromises that ensured its continued existence as a cohesive Christian denomination.

Massee was born in Marshallville, Georgia. He was the youngest child of Drewry Washington Massee (a physician) and Susan Elizabeth Bryan Massee, and grew up a Southern Baptist in Marshallville. He attended Mercer University, then spent a year teaching before marrying and being ordained in 1893. In 1896, after the death of his first wife, he remarried and entered the Southern Baptist Theological Seminary, where he stayed for a year before returning to preaching.

Massee presided over a conference of conservative forces in the NBC (entitled "Fundamentals of Our Baptist Faith") in Buffalo, New York prior to the 1920 convention, and was elected president of the Fundamentalist Fellowship that it formed. This group forced an investigation of liberal Christianity in the Baptist schools, but the process led to Massee becoming alienated from its more aggressive members. In 1923, radical fundamentalists formed the Baptist Bible Union, with Massee continuing to head the moderate faction. He was attacked by the radicals for cooperating with the liberals, while the liberals had little use for his theology. In 1925, he resigned leadership of the Fundamentalist Fellowship, due to his wife's invalidism and the continued infighting, and instead worked towards seeking reconciliation.

He was one of 68 Baptist leaders who met in Chicago on 13 March 1926 with the aim of forging a compromise between fundamentalists and liberal modernists in their common interest of supporting the NBC as a denomination.

== Books by J. C. Massee ==
- The Gospel in the Ten Commandments, Butler, IN Higley Press 1922, ISBN B0007G45KS
- Conflict and Conquest in Holiness (1924)
- The Ten Greatest Chapters in the Bible (1924)
- The Ten Greatest Christian Doctrines (1925)
- Eternal Life in Action: An Illustrated Exposition of the First Epistle of John (1925)
- The Ten Greatest Words About Jesus (1926), 155 pages
- Evangelistic Sermons (1926)
- The Ten Greatest Sayings of Jesus (1927), 161 pages
- The Pentecostal Fire: Rekindling the Flame (1930), 150 pages
- Evangelism in the Local Church (1939)
- The Holy Spirit (1940), 144 pages
- "Pioneers in Righteousness or Old Testament Character Sermons" (1927), 170 pgs.
