= Arthur Massey (composer) =

Australian organist, teacher and composer

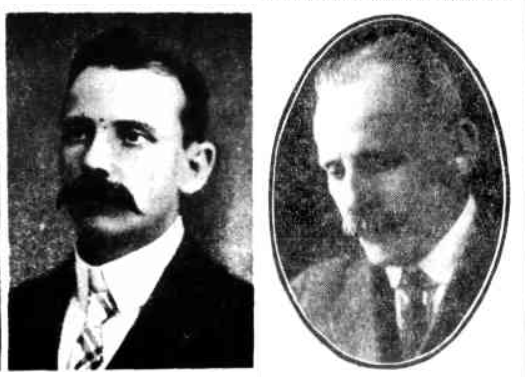
- Arthur Massey in 1903 and 1922

Background information
- Born: 1 February 1861; Mudgee, New South Wales, Australia
- Died: 10 August 1950 (aged 89)
- Occupations: Composer, teacher, conductor
- Instruments: organ, piano
- Years active: 1885–1935

A Child This Day is Born
MIDI file of 'A Child This Day Is Born'

Arthur Massey (1861 – 10 August 1950) was an Australian organist, teacher, conductor and composer.

== History ==
Massey was born in Mudgee, New South Wales, the second of five sons of Joseph Richard Massey, a.k.a. Joseph Massey sen. (July 1827 – 14 February 1900) and Mary Massey, ne Patrick (c. 1835–1898). His paternal grandparents were Joseph and Sarah Massey who emigrated from London to Sydney aboard Richard Reynolds, arriving 14 August 1833. He had four brothers, all organists: Joseph jun., Arthur, Edward and Thomas, as were two grandsons: Victor and Noel Massey (further information at Joseph Massey sen.)

== Career ==
Massey was organist at St John's, Parramatta (now St John's Cathedral) in the 1880s and accepted a teaching position at The King's School, Parramatta in 1886.

In 1887 Massey founded a Liedertafel in Parramatta and acted as its conductor.

Massey served as organist at St John's Church of England in Glebe in the early 1900s before being appointed organist and choirmaster at St Clement's Church of England, Mosman, from 1903 to 1917.

He died in Manly, New South Wales.

== Works ==
- Eleven Christmas Carols (of which ten are original settings)
- Sweet Lavender Gavotte
- The Voice of the Organ
- Love's Delight (song in waltz time, with words by B. A. Withers)
