= John Massey (prisoner) =

Britain's longest-serving prisoner

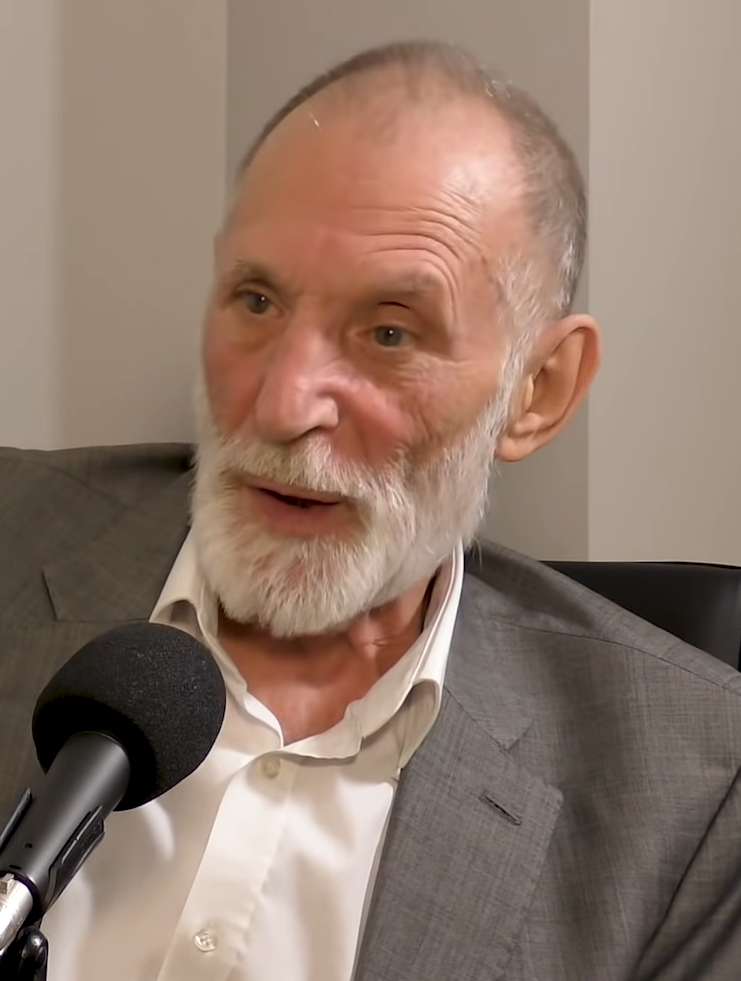
Massey in 2022

John Massey (born 1948) is an English former prisoner who was the longest-serving prisoner in the United Kingdom, having been imprisoned for nearly 43 years by the time he was paroled.

He received a mandatory life sentence, with a minimum term of 20 years, for the murder of Charlie Higgins, a pub doorman, in 1975, but spent more than double that amount of time incarcerated after escaping on three occasions; firstly during an escorted visit in 1994 to see his parents in Kentish Town, North London in which he fled to Spain and spent two years there before he was arrested and then extradited three years later; again in 2007 when he escaped to see his dying father Jack; and finally in 2012, after he was denied compassionate leave to see his mother, May, who was on her deathbed. In this period after the escape he was denied three times by the Parole Board. He was released on parole in 2018.

In November 2019, Massey was the subject of a Channel 4 documentary called What Makes a Murderer, where he was interviewed and assessed both physically and psychologically to investigate whether there were pre-existing factors which made him more likely to kill. The programme found that he had two specific brain abnormalities which, combined with childhood abandonment at the age of three, may have contributed to him committing murder.
