= John Massey (cricketer) =

English cricketer

John Alfred Massey (26 April 1899 – 23 June 1963) was an English first-class cricketer active 1920–31 who played for Middlesex. He was born in Harrow; died in Colchester.
