= Jack Massey (footballer) =

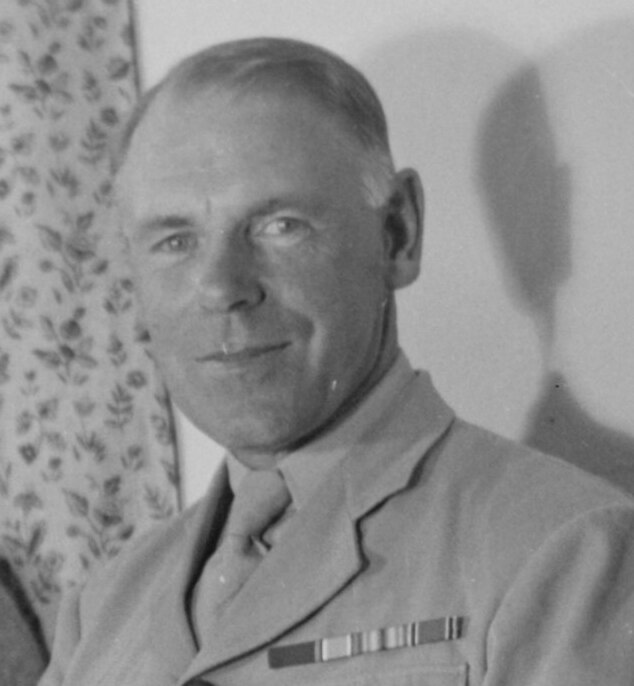
- Photo of Massey in 1941

Personal information
- Full name: John Tolson Massey
- Born: 1 May 1887; Hawthorn, Victoria
- Died: 18 July 1981 (aged 94); Camberwell, Victoria
- Original team: Carlton Juniors

Playing career^{1}
Years	Club	Games (Goals)
1910	Carlton	2 (1)
- ^{1} Playing statistics correct to the end of 1910.

John Tolson Massey OBE (1 May 1887 – 18 July 1981) was an Australian rules footballer who played with Carlton in the Victorian Football League (VFL) and a long serving National General Secretary of the YMCA of Australia.

John Tolson Massey was born in Hawthorn on 1 May 1887 the son of Herbert John Massey, a draper, and Fanny Tolson. He first came to public prominence when in 1910 he was recruited from Carlton Juniors (later Carlton District) to play two games with Carlton in the VFL. Massey became the 242nd senior player to represent the Blues.

Like his brother Claude, Jack was educated at Footscray College. In 1903 he joined the importing firm Paterson, Laing & Bruce Ltd. An active member of the Church of England, he soon became involved in youth work. He joined the Australian Natives' Association, serving as president of its Elsternwick and Caulfield branch. His pacifism was overtaken by the outbreak of World War I, and after rejection for army service because of a leg injury, he embarked upon what would become both career and ministry by joining the YMCA as a field secretary with the Australian Imperial Force.

Attached to the 4th Division, Massey went to England in 1916 and then to France and Belgium, where he helped to provide comforts for the troops. Granted the honorary rank of captain in 1918, he remained in Belgium until January 1919 when he joined the International YMCA Hospitality League in London, caring for soldiers awaiting repatriation.

== YMCA ==
In August 1919 he returned to Australia. Winning the Dallen prize as dux of the YMCA's training school, he was appointed assistant general secretary of its Melbourne branch.

In February 1920 Massey was named general secretary of the YMCA in South Australia, but before taking up this position he funded his own travel to North America for further study. Once settled in Adelaide, he rebuilt and extended an organisation neglected during the war and expanded its activities, establishing himself as an effective speaker and organiser and a well-loved 'chief'. He conducted difficult negotiations to buy the association's building, undertook fund-raising, promoted staff training and superannuation and a staff journal, and played cricket and football for the 'Y'. He travelled extensively to YMCA centres and conferences, touring overseas in 1925-26 (when he was an Australian delegate to the first conference of the Institute of Pacific Relations at Honolulu, Hawaii) and in 1936 to Japan, India and North Africa. He was YMCA General Secretary in South Australia from 1920 to 1938. During that time he spent some time as chair of the SA Amateur Football Association bringing in positive changes to that organisation and football in Australia.

In 1925 he spent time as a Staff Member of the YMCA in the United States. In 1939 he moved to England and served as Executive Secretary of the National YMCAs of England returning to Australia in 1944 as National General Secretary of the YMCA of Australia a post he held for many years.

He had a long and distinguished career as a YMCA Secretary (CEO) and established many YMCA's across the country to deliver community services. In 1962 he was appointed as an Officer of the Order of the British Empire for is services to migrants.

== Literary Society ==
He was an active supporter of the YMCA literary society and president of the Literary Societies' Union of South Australia in 1932.

== Good Neighbour Council ==
Massey was also seconded to the Commonwealth Government as organiser of voluntary organisations and churches assisting assimilation of immigrants into Australian life in 1949. His efforts during 1949 and 1950 were devoted to the formation of the Good Neighbour Councils (or New Settlers Leagues). He was Commonwealth Coordinator of the Good Neighbour Movement, which gave assistance to migrants at a personal level. The Good Neighbour Council of the A.C.T. was dissolved

== Summary ==
Records of the Good Neighbour Councils of various states, held personally by J. T. Massey. They include material relating to the establishment, and early operations of the Councils; in Massey's own words: "pioneering correspondence, plans, my appointment, reports, submissions etc., commencement and growth of the States and at Canberra, papers of conferences of presidents and secretaries from 1949 to 1959." Some of the allied organisations represented in the collection are: Australian Citizenship Convention; National Migration Consultation, Melbourne, 1962; New Settler's League of Queensland. There are also articles by Massey, C. A. Price and Sir Kingsley Morris as well as "A sentimental journey to Australian battlefields in France : the Great Restoration", by J.T. Massey. Also report of action taken departmentally and by Good Neighbour organisations on the resolutions of the 3rd Australian Citizenship Convention, 1952.

== Biography ==
J. T. Massey was the National General Secretary of the Y.M.C.A. His efforts during 1949 and 1950 were devoted to the formation of the Good Neighbour Councils (or New Settlers Leagues). He was Commonwealth Coordinator of the Good Neighbour Movement, which gave assistance to migrants at a personal level. The Good Neighbour Council of the A.C.T. was dissolved in 1980.

== Death ==
He died at Camberwell on 18 July 1981 at the age of 94 having lived an outstanding life of public service.

== Notes ==
Manuscript reference no.: MS 932.

Cited In

Guide to collections of manuscripts relating to Australia; A990

Subjects Massey, J. T. (John Tolson), -- Archives. | Good Neighbour Movement. | Immigrants—Australia.

Time Coverage 1949-1960
