= Alicia Lloyd Still =

British nurse (1869–1944)

Dame Alicia Lloyd Still DBE RRC
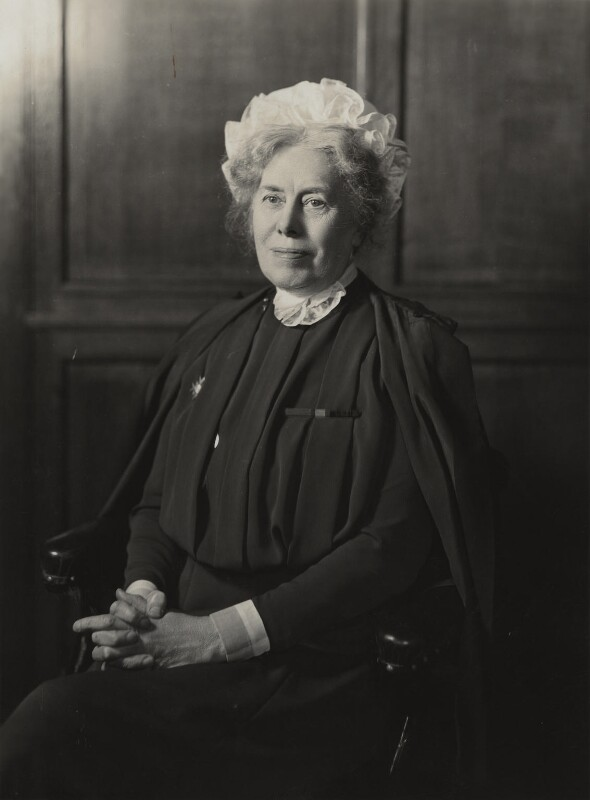
- Lloyd Still in 1934
- Born: Alicia Frances Jane Lloyd Still; 4 November 1869; Colombo, Ceylon (now Sri Lanka)
- Died: 23 July 1944 (aged 74); Buckfast, Devon, England
- Occupations: Nurse, teacher, hospital matron

Dame Alicia Frances Jane Lloyd Still DBE RRC (4 November 1869 – 23 July 1944) was a British nurse, teacher, hospital matron and leader of her profession. She was one of the leaders in the campaign for state registration of nurses. Following the Nurses Registration Act 1919, she was a member of the General Nursing Council (1920-1937). As chairwoman of the General Nursing Council's first Education and Examinations Committee she helped establish the first national examination standards for the registration of nurses.

== Early life and nursing career ==
Alicia Frances Jane Lloyd Still was born in Colombo, Ceylon, on 4 November 1869 to Isabel (née Clements) and Henry Lloyd Still, a member of the Ceylon Civil Service. She was the eldest of four children and grew up in Walton, by Clevedon, Somerset.

Lloyd Still's admiration of Florence Nightingale led her to choose to become a nurse. She commenced nursing in July 1893 at the Cottage Hospital, Warminster, Wiltshire as at the time the larger hospitals with nursing schools did not accept women younger than 25 years to train. She became a probationer at the Florence Nightingale School at St. Thomas' Hospital, London, UK on 29 December 1894, under the matron, Miss Gordon. Florence Nightingale was still closely involved with the school, the Nightingale Fund and the appointment of new hospital sisters at St. Thomas' Hospital. Lloyd Still completed her training and was appointed Sister of Charity ward in the same year (1899); receiving directly from Florence Nightingale a letter, a medical text book and a posy of flowers on her appointment.

== Later nursing career ==
Lloyd Still was appointed matron first at the Brompton Hospital, 1904, then the Middlesex Hospital, 1909 and then St. Thomas' Hospital 1913, where she was also superintendent of the Nightingale Training School, until her retirement in 1937.

During the First World War, Lloyd Still was principal matron of No. 5 London (City of London) General Hospital, and was awarded the Royal Red Cross and appointed a Commander of the Order of the British Empire for her services.

Whilst matron of St. Thomas Hospital, Lloyd Still was a founding member of the College of Nursing Ltd (27 March 1916) which was established to promote better and uniform education and training of nurses, maintain a register of nurses who had certificates of proficiency and support parliamentary actions to in support of the profession of nursing. The College of Nursing later became the Royal College of Nursing. Lloyd Still was an active member, becoming an elected member of the Council of the College of Nursing 1920–1938, and vice president from 1938 to 1944.

Lloyd Still was instrumental in the creation of the Association of Hospital Matrons in 1919 and elected the first president, a post she held for 23 years, from 1919 to 1937.

=== General Nursing Council ===
Following the Nurses Registration Act 1919, Matron Lloyd Still was appointed by the Minister of Health, Christopher Addison, 1st Viscount Addison, to the first caretaker General Nursing Council. She was subsequently elected to the General Nursing Council as a nurse member by nurses in 1920, 1927 and 1932, remaining a member of the Council until 1937. She was chairwoman of the education and examinations committee from 1920. She was the second name, after Ethel Gordon Fenwick, on the newly established register of the General Nursing Council in 1921.

=== Other contributions ===
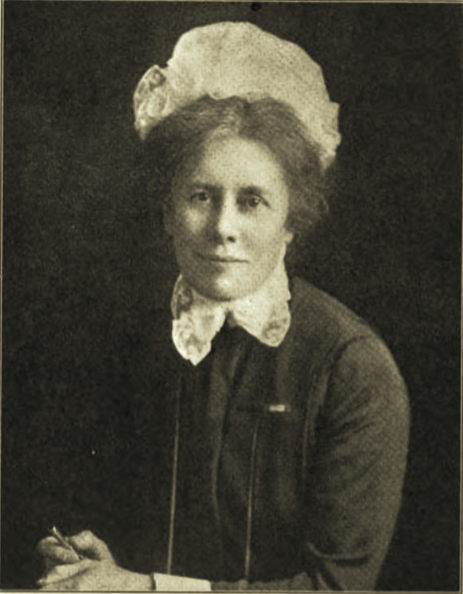
1925

Lloyd Still was a member of the Nursing Board of Queen Alexandra's Imperial Military Nursing Service (1917–1935), vice president of the National Council of Nurses of Great Britain and Ireland, and founder and president of the Association of Hospital Matrons, 1919–1937.

Lloyd Still was nominated by the British Red Cross Society to attend the Cannes Medical Conference 1919 which established the League of Red Cross Societies.

Lloyd Still was instrumental in taking forward in Great Britain the Medical Conference's resolution on nursing: "That the extension of the employment of Public Health Nurses or Health Visitors be furthered in every possible manner in all countries and that standardized educational centers for training such nurses or visitors be developed".

Lloyd Still was a member of the committee that established a public health nursing course, open to overseas nurses, at Bedford College, University of London in 1921. She attended International Council of Nursing meetings as representative of Great Britain in 1927 and 1929, and was elected President in 1933. She was president of the Florence Nightingale International Foundation, 1934–1939.

== Awards ==
- Royal Red Cross (awarded 1917)
- Commander of the Order of the British Empire (1917)
- Lady of Grace of the Order of St. John (1922)
- Florence Nightingale Medal (1933)
- Dame Commander of the Order of the British Empire (1934)
- Medaille d'honneur de l'assistance publique (1934)

== Retirement ==
Lloyd Still retired to Curry Rivel, Sedgemoor in Somerset, during the Second World War. When she became terminally ill, she moved in with her younger sister in Buckfast, Devon, where she was nursed by two Nightingale nurses. She died there on 23 July 1944. A funeral service was held in the chapel at St Thomas's Hospital, and she was buried on 26 July in Brookwood cemetery, Surrey, in an area that she had acquired for Nightingale nurses.

== Florence Nightingale Museum ==
Lloyd Still collected things used or associated with Florence Nightingale as important artefacts for the history of the nursing profession. Her papers helped to found the Florence Nightingale Museum (Museum and Galleries Commission Registration #584), opened in 1989. It is on the historical site of the first purpose-built nurse training institution, the Nightingale Training School for Nurses, which closed in 1996, at St Thomas' Hospital.

The collections held by the museum may be traced back to the gifts from Nightingale to the nurses at St Thomas' in the late 19th century; Lloyd Still was matron of St Thomas' from 1913 to 1937. There were plans for a Nightingale museum as early as the 1930s, but these were shelved with the Second World War and not reconsidered until the late 1970s.

Prior to the museum's formation, the collections were displayed and received acclaim on major anniversaries such as 1954 (the Crimean Centenary), 1960 (the Nightingale Training School Centenary) and 1970 (the 150th anniversary of Nightingale's birth). The Florence Nightingale Museum Trust was formed in 1983 and is run as an independent charity with strong links with Guy's and St Thomas' NHS Foundation Trust, with the British National Health Service in general, and with nursing organizations across the world. The museum aims to provide excellent educational services for a range of users from special educational needs groups in the local community to international nurses. The museum had 27,400 visitors in 2004. It is a Registered Charity, #299576.

== Students ==
Among Lloyd Still's notable students were Dorothy Bannon the first matron-in-chief of London County Council hospitals and school nursing services (1929–1940), and Theodora Turner, a future president of the Royal College of Nursing.

== Bibliography ==
- Lucy Seymer, Dame Alicia Lloyd Still, D.B.E. R.R.C., 1869–1944: A memoir [With Portraits], Nightingale Fellowship, St. Thomas's Hospital, Smith & Ebbs, London (1953)
