= Brownlow Hill infirmary =

Liverpool workhouse infirmary

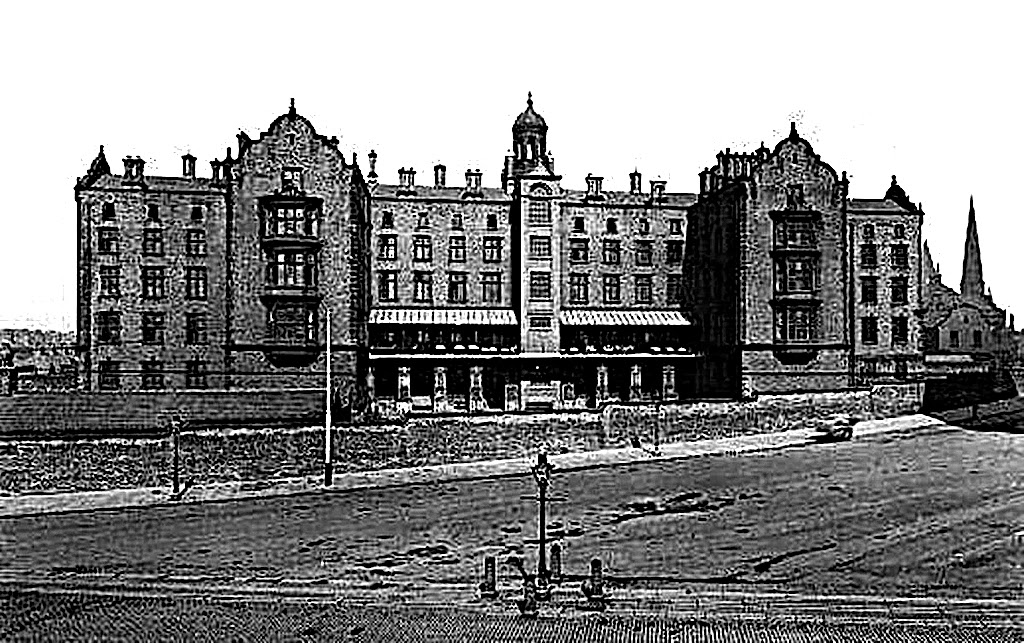
- Brownlow Hill infirmary

- Shown in Merseyside

Geography
- Location: Liverpool, Merseyside, England
- Coordinates: 53.405°N 2.969°W

Organisation
- Type: Public subscription

History
- Founded: 1772
- Closed: Late 1920s

Links
- Lists: Hospitals in England

Brownlow Hill infirmary was a large workhouse infirmary in Liverpool, notable for its role in advancing training of nurses. The workhouse was demolished in 1931, and the site is now occupied by Liverpool's Catholic cathedral.

== History ==
Initial construction of the workhouse was completed in May 1772. It was extended by addition of six further houses to both the southeast and southwest wings in 1777, a public dispensary (completed in 1780), four houses to form a hospital for casual paupers (1786), a lunatic asylum (1787), and a fever ward (1801). By the 1790s, the workhouse accommodated over 1000 people, and further extensions were added in 1792 and 1796. A report in 1805 by churchwarden Henderson revealed that of 1600 paupers housed in the workhouse and nearby almshouses, only 20 were able-bodied men, with 437 unable to work due to sickness or infirmity. The workhouse was expanded (effectively rebuilt) in the 1840s (to designs by architects Henry Lockwood and Thomas Allom), with a chapel erected in 1855 and a hospital 'for the reception of poor persons suffering from infectious diseases' added in 1863. At its peak it was one of the largest workhouses in the UK with an official capacity of over 3000 inmates but sometimes holding as many as 5000.

== Nurse training ==
The workhouse also housed one of the largest infirmaries in the country. It catered for 1200 sick paupers. Liverpool philanthropist William Rathbone obtained permission from the Liverpool Vestry to introduce trained nurses (at his own expense for three years) at the workhouse hospital in 1864, and invited Agnes Jones, then at the London Great Northern Hospital, to be the first trained Nursing Superintendent in 1865. The conditions in the infirmary when she arrived were described as "disorder, extravagance of every description in the establishment to an incredible degree". Soon after she arrived, Jones brought 12 trained nurses and seven probationers (all trained at the Nightingale School of Nursing in London) to the infirmary. This initial group were supplemented by further probationers and 54 able-bodied female inmates who were paid a small salary. This was the first training for nurses in any workhouse infirmary, paving the way for nurse training systems in other workhouses across the UK; social reformer Eva McLaren was among those trained there as a nurse.

== Closure ==
The need for the workhouse and its hospital gradually reduced during the late 19th and early 20th centuries, with the institution closing in the late 1920s and the site being put up for sale in 1930. Acquired by the Roman Catholic church, the workhouse was demolished in 1931 and the site is today occupied by the Liverpool Metropolitan Cathedral.

== Bibliography ==
- Royden, Mike (2017), 'The Poor Law and Workhouse in Liverpool' in Tales from the 'Pool, Creative Dreams, ISBN 978-0993552410
- Royden, Mike (2000) ‘The Nineteenth century Poor Law in Liverpool and its Hinterland: Towards the Origins of the Workhouse Infirmary’, Journal of the Liverpool Medical History Society, Volume 11
