= Dorothy Bannon =

English nurse

- Born: Dorothy Edith Bannon; 7 June 1885; New Romney, Kent, England
- Died: 1 February 1940 (aged 54); London, England
- Occupations: nurse, nursing manager
- Years active: 1916–1940

Dorothy Bannon (7 June 1885 – 1 February 1940) was a pioneering British nurse who as Chief Matron-in-Charge of the Hospital and School Nursing Service of the London County Council. She was instrumental in the development of Britain's public-funded nursing service.

== Early life ==
Dorothy Edith Bannon was born on 7 June 1885 in New Romney, Kent, England to Kate (née Mann) and James Norman Bannon. She entered her nurse's training at the Nightingale School of Nursing under Matron Alicia Lloyd Still in 1913, completing her course in 1916. At her graduation, she was awarded the medal for proficiency in the theory and practice.

== Career ==
Bannon began her career as a ward sister of St Thomas' Hospital and in 1918 received a Cowdray scholarship from the College of Nursing to study nurse's teaching at King's College of Household and Social Science after completing the one-year course, the dean requested that she be allowed to continue for an additional year to study public health. In 1920, upon completion of her studies, Bannon was appointed as night superintendent at St. Thomas' Hospital. After serving for two years, she moved to St Mary's Hospital in Paddington, where she took up the post of matron. Immediately she set to work establishing a nurses' training school based on the principals she had learned. Within seven months, the training course was operational and utilizing the new curriculum developed by the General Nursing Council (GNC) for nurse registration.

In 1928, Bannon made plans to enter an Anglican convent, and left her position at St Mary's. Within a year, she had been induced to join the Hospital and School Medical Service which had newly been established by the London County Council (LCC). As Matron-in-Chief of the service, her job was to direct and supervise the 11,000 nurses who worked at the seventy-five various facilities, including asylums, hospitals, sanatoria and schools, which made up the LCC network. The pioneering scheme, employed nurses for the centralized organization, rather than for specific hospitals. She presided over County Hall meetings of matrons, evaluating staff inspections and had to balance daily operations activities with strategic planning for the LCC.

Among the facilities Bannon oversaw were twenty-seven infirmaries which served as training schools. The schools had to meet the standards requirements of the GNC, while simultaneously meeting the service delivery requirements of the LCC, which were sometimes at odds. Transitioning general training to a four-year study, Bannon was able to shift the LCC from the volunteer type service that had previously existed in England to a public-funded profession. The LCC supplemented additional training of nurses to allow them to specialize and earn higher salaries. In 1935, she implemented a plan which reduced the work week for nurses to 54 hours-per-week and turned the housekeeping duties over to orderlies. As World War II approached, Bannon organized the Emergency Medical Service and incorporated the LCC hospitals into the Civil Defense sectors into which London had been divided. During the Phoney War, she reassigned student nurses to other duties, recognizing that with the expected casualties, hospitals and staff would be at a premium. In the 1933 Birthday Honours she was honored as a Commander of the Order of the British Empire.

== Death and legacy ==
At the height of her service, Bannon contracted meningitis and died on 1 February 1940 at St Thomas' Hospital in London.
