= Lucy Osburn =

English nurse

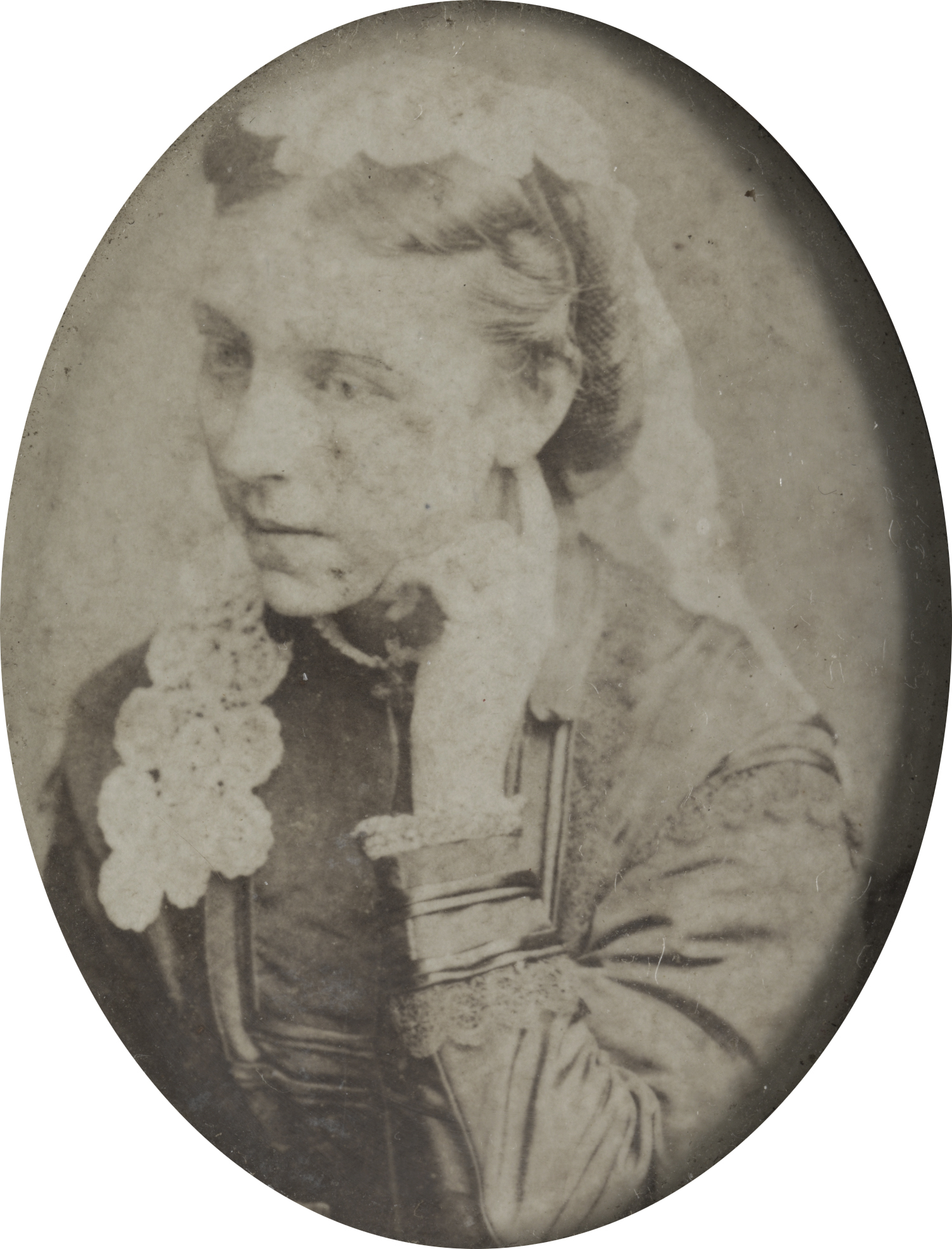
- Lucy Osburn, Sydney, Australia, c. 1869
- Born: 1 April 1836; Leeds, Yorkshire, England, UK
- Died: 22 December 1891 (aged 55); Harrogate, Yorkshire, England, UK
- Education: Nightingale Training School at St Thomas' Hospital
- Known for: Founder of modern nursing in Australia
- Medical career
- Profession: Nurse
- Institutions: St Thomas' Hospital

Lucy Osburn (1 April 1836 – 22 December 1891) was an English nurse trained at the School of Nursing founded by Florence Nightingale (now part of King's College London). She is regarded as the founder of modern nursing in Australia.

== Early life ==
Osburn was born in Leeds, Yorkshire, England. Her father William Osburn was a wine and spirits merchant but his passion was for Egyptology, writing books and social reform. When Lucy was around five years old, her father became bankrupt and reputedly moved to Manchester. She remained in Leeds, living with her aunt, but attended school in Southwell, Nottinghamshire, believed to be Catherine Heathcote's boarding school for 'young ladies'. When she was 21 years old, she was employed as a governess and companion to her cousin's family in Jerusalem. She stayed there for three years, and travelled in Europe before returning home. During this time she claimed to have learnt nursing. When Florence Nightingale later questioned her claim, Lucy avoided the question by stating her 'best loved occupation was I believe breaking in Arab horses on Syrian plains'.

== Nursing ==
By the time Lucy Osburn returned to England she had developed an interest in nursing. It is likely that, like so many other educated socially aware women, she visited the famous Deaconess Training Hospital at Kaiserswerth in Düsseldorf, Germany. By 1866 she toyed with accepting an invitation to become a medical missionary in India. With this is mind, she entered the Nightingale Training School at St Thomas' Hospital. Legend has it that it was against her family's wishes, but there is no evidence that this was so. Rather, Lucy Osburn had long alienated her family by her conversion to High Church Anglicanism, a creed fiercely opposed by her Evangelical father.

The training offered by the Nightingale School took a year though Lucy missed four months largely through illness. The School was badly run at the time, a fact which Florence Nightingale only later realised. The training in surgical nursing was particularly poor. When Lucy Osburn was one month into her training, the Matron of St Thomas', Sarah Wardroper, selected her to lead a team of nurses to found the Nightingale system of nursing in Australia.

The opportunity to go to Australia had come about because the politician and social reformer, Henry Parkes, wrote to Florence Nightingale requesting nurses to reform nursing in New South Wales. They were to be based at the Sydney Infirmary and Dispensary and train nurses to institute the new nursing system throughout the colony. Lucy Osburn and five other St Thomas' trained nurses, including Haldane Turriff, arrived in Sydney on 5 March 1868. Within a week of her arrival she was called upon to provide nurses to care for the Duke of Edinburgh following an attempt on his life.

By December Lucy Osburn had trained 16 additional nurses at the first secular nurse training facility in the colony. Her efforts were soon obstructed by her lack of management and nursing experience, internal hospital politics, the opposition of the powerful surgeon Alfred Roberts, poor buildings, vermin problems and a series of scandals. Religion was a particular source of tension as Lucy Osburn instituted practices similar to that of High Church nursing orders despite Sydney Infirmary being a secular institution. As it was a time of heightened tensions between Roman Catholics and Protestants, the fear that she was secretly introducing Catholic practices was potent. One accusation, that of Bible-burning, resulted in a six-week Inquiry. She was vindicated, but suspicions remained. In 1873, at the Royal Commission on public charities, Roberts claimed that Nightingale had accused Osburn of "having views of her own...beyond the Nightingale system". Despite such concerns, the Commission concluded that Lucy Osburn had vastly improved patient care at the Infirmary.

After this Report, conditions at the infirmary began to improve. In 1884, faced with another scandal and suffering ill health, Osburn resigned and returned to England. She had spent a total of 16 years and eight months working in Sydney. Despite all her difficulties, she had reformed nursing at Sydney Hospital; trained nurses who spread the Nightingale system of nursing to other hospitals; established that it was necessary for nurses to be trained rather than just learn from experience; and had validated a system of nursing that put the patient's welfare as the central concern of a nurse.

From October 1886 Lucy Osburn lived in London and trained to be a district nurse with the Metropolitan and National Nursing Association for Providing Trained Nurses for the Sick Poor in their Own Homes (MNNA). Two years later she was appointed Superintendent of the MNNA's Newington and Walworth branch.

== Later life ==
In 1891, Lucy Osburn resigned because she was too ill to work. She went to her sister who ran a boarding school in Harrogate, Yorkshire. Lucy Osburn died there from complications of diabetes.

== Named in her honour ==
- Osburn House at Somerville House
- Lucy Osburn-Nightingale Museum, Sydney Hospital.

== Other honors ==
Osburn was posthumously inducted onto the Victorian Honour Roll of Women in 2001.

Her name is one of those featured on the sculpture Ribbons, unveiled in 2024.
