= Agnes Jones (nurse) =

Irish nurse

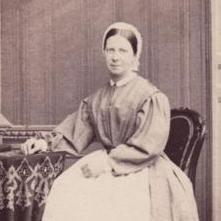
- Jones, c. 1866
- Born: Agnes Elizabeth Jones; November 10, 1832; Cambridge, United Kingdom
- Died: 1868 (aged 35–36)

Agnes Elizabeth Jones (1832 – 1868) of Fahan, County Donegal, Ireland became the first trained Nursing Superintendent of Liverpool Workhouse Infirmary. She gave all her time and energy to her patients and died at the age of 35 from typhus fever. Florence Nightingale said of Jones: ‘She overworked as others underwork. I looked upon hers as one of the most valuable lives in England.’

== Life ==
Agnes Jones was born on 10 November 1832 in Cambridge into a wealthy family with both military and evangelical religious connections. Her uncle was Sir John Lawrence, later Lord Lawrence who went on to become Governor-General of India.

In the early years of Jones' life, the family moved to Fahan in County Donegal, Ireland, though they followed her father's career with the army, notably to Mauritius. Her home education was supplemented when she went to Miss Ainsworth's school at Avonbank near Stratford-upon-Avon and stayed until 1850.

During a holiday in Europe with her family she met and was deeply impressed by deaconesses who were from the Institution of Kaiserswerth, which had earlier overseen the early nursing experiences of Florence Nightingale. She visited the Institution in Bonn, and saw the hospital, orphanage, an asylum and two schools run by the deaconesses. Jones returned home to Ireland and used the experience she had gained.

In 1859 she went to London, making contact with Florence Nightingale and Sarah Elizabeth Wardroper, senior nurse of St Thomas' Hospital. Nightingale said of her that she was "a woman attractive and rich and young and witty; yet a veiled and silent woman, distinguished by no other genius than the divine genius".

In 1862 Agnes Jones commenced nurse training in the Nightingale School at St Thomas Hospital in London. When her year's training was complete, Nightingale called her our "best and dearest pupil". However her greatest work was ahead of her and was in Liverpool.

Liverpool Workhouse Infirmary, at Brownlow Hill was one of the largest infirmaries in the country. It catered for 1,200 sick paupers. Liverpool philanthropist William Rathbone obtained permission from the Liverpool Vestry to introduce trained nurses (at his own expense for three years) at the workhouse hospital in 1864, and invited Jones to move from the London Great Northern Hospital, to be the first trained Nursing Superintendent in 1865. The conditions in the infirmary when she arrived were described as "disorder, extravagance of every description in the establishment to an incredible degree". Soon after she arrived, Jones brought 12 trained nurses and seven probationers (all trained at the Nightingale School of Nursing in London) to the infirmary. This initial group were supplemented by further probationers and 54 able-bodied female inmates who were paid a small salary. This was the first training for nurses in any workhouse infirmary, paving the way for nurse training systems in other workhouses across the UK; social reformer Eva McLaren was among those trained there as a nurse.

== Death and legacy ==
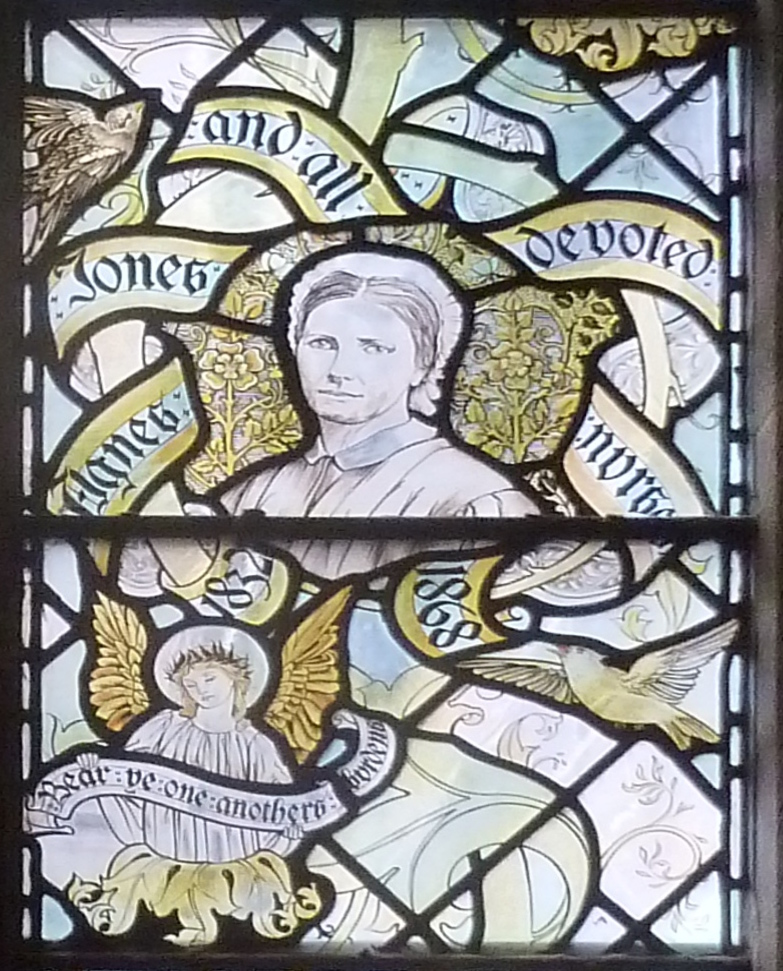
Agnes Jones detail from a window in Liverpool Anglican cathedral

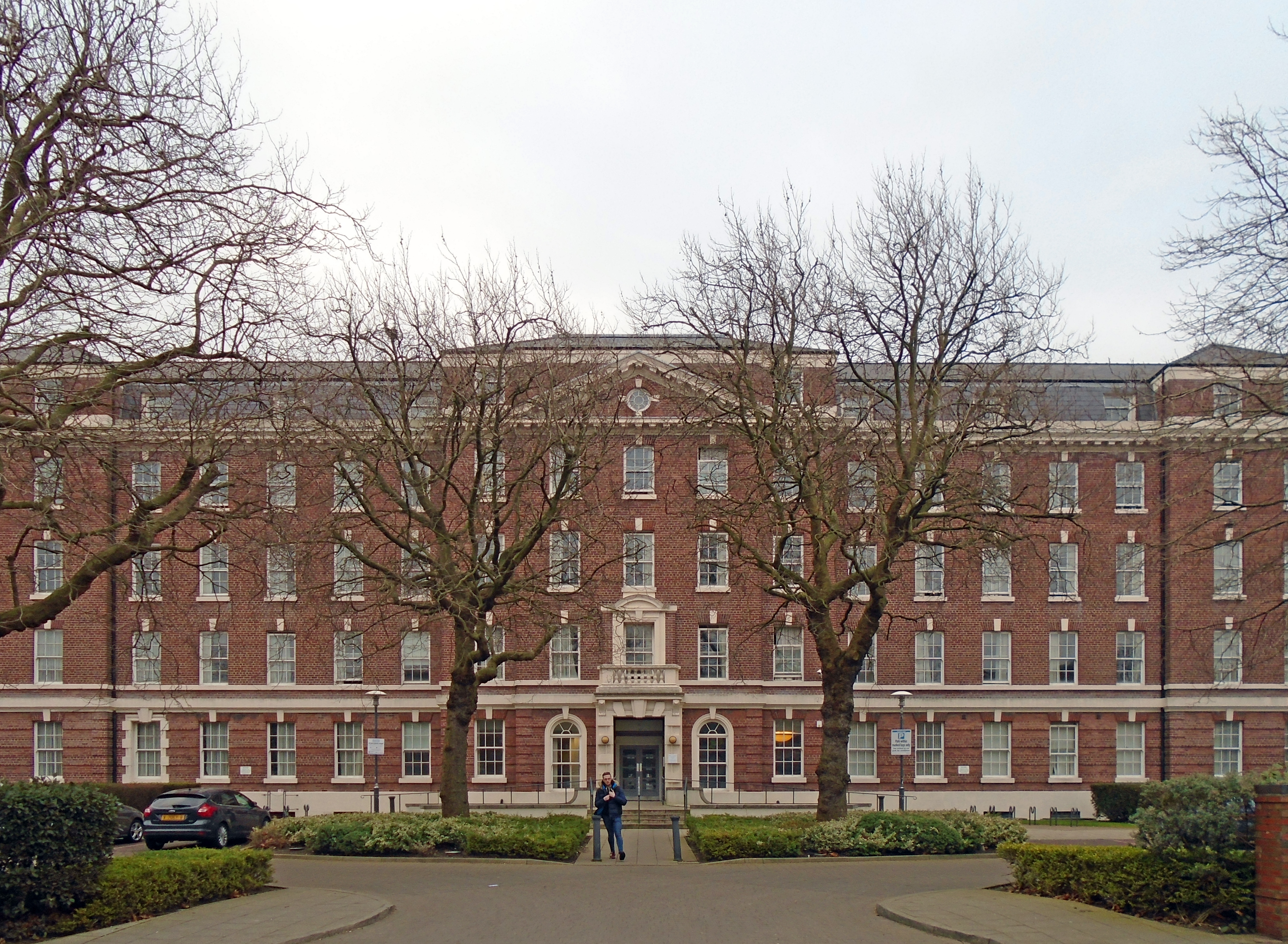
Agnes Jones House is a converted Women's hospital that is now a student's hall of residence

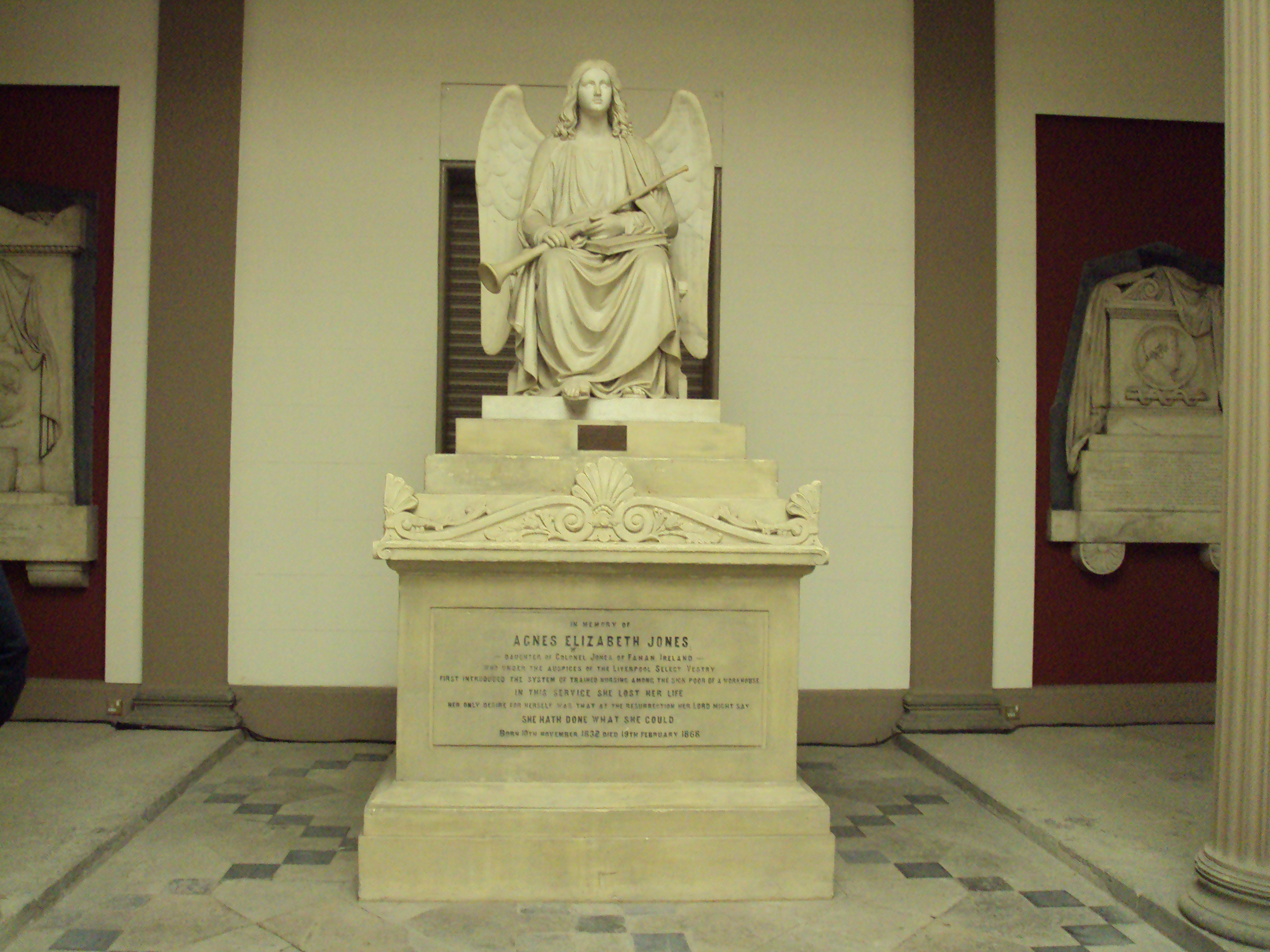
Statue of Agnes Elizabeth Jones in The Oratory, St James Cemetery, Liverpool

Jones' contribution to the welfare of the sick paupers was enormous, and she worked tirelessly to make the experiment a success. However the work took its toll upon her, and at the age of just 35 years of age she died of typhus fever. This condition was endemic among the poor of Liverpool during this period. Jones's only publication was a Bible study, The Gospel Promises shown in Isaiah I to VI. Her sister published her Memorials of Agnes Elizabeth Jones in 1871. A Guardian review of Nightingale's introduction said it "should read like a trumpet call in the ears of any lady who is conscious of a similar vocation".

The memory of her outstanding contribution to nursing, to Liverpool and to the poor is commemorated in Liverpool. A window in the Anglican Cathedral is dedicated to her memory, and a statue to her exists in the Cathedral Oratory. Also, a local housing association has named a large student hall of residence after her.

Agnes Jones is now buried in her beloved Ireland. Her recently refurbished grave can be found in the quiet country graveyard of Fahan, 4 miles south from Buncrana in County Donegal. This graveyard is also home to one of the oldest Celtic covering stones in Ireland dating back to the time of St. Columba.

== Bibliography ==
- Una and Her Paupers Florence Nightingale & Anon, Diggory Press ISBN 978-1-905363-22-3
- Agnes Jones Felicity McCall Guildhall Press ISBN 0-946451-96-6
- Cope, Zachary. Six Disciples of Florence Nightingale. London: Pitman Medical 1961:1-12.
- Jones, Agnes Elizabeth. The Gospel Promises shown in Isaiah I to VI. London: James Nisbet 1875.
- McDonald, Lynn. "Agnes Elizabeth Jones (1832–68)." in Lynn McDonald, ed. Florence Nightingale on Public Health Care. Waterloo ON: Wilfrid Laurier University Press 2004:678.
- -- McDonald, Lynn. "Workhouse Infirmaries in Nightingale's Day," in Florence Nightingale on Public Health Care 222–308.
- Memorials of Agnes Elizabeth Jones by Her Sister. London: Strahan 1871.
- Ross, J. Cosbie Ross and Ross, John. A Gifted Touch: A Biography of Agnes Jones. Worthing: Churchman 1988.
