= Felicity McCall =

Irish journalist, writer and broadcaster

Felicity McCall is an Irish journalist, writer and broadcaster who began her career with two decades working for BBC Northern Ireland. She has over twenty published works include novels, non-fiction, plays, and anthologies. In 2026 she won Ireland's Carousel Publishing Award for best anthology for her short story collection, What We Did on Our Holidays (Colmcille Press, 2025.)

== Life ==
McCall worked for the BBC for twenty years and in around 2000 she became a full-time writer.

In 2006, she published a biography of Agnes Jones, the Irish nursing pioneer who was inspired by Florence Nightingale and reformed the Liverpool workhouses.

McCall's plays have been produced in the UK, Ireland, the US, and Australasia. Her play, We Were Brothers, received the UK National Lottery Award for Heritage in 2011. She also received two Epic Ireland awards in 2013 for Every Bottle has a Story to Tell, two Meyer Whitworth nominations for No Goodbyes (2008) and We Were Brothers (2010), and the Tyrone Guthrie Scriptwriting Award (2006–07). Much of her work is based on historical fact or social activism. Her screenplay credits include Agnes (Ambient Light/GSCA 2006), based on the life of Agnes Jones, and Jam (Brassneck Productions).

McCall is also a director and founding member of the theatre groups Handful Productions and Postscript. She also co-founded the Derry Writers' Group and served on the Irish Executive of the National Union of Journalists.
