= Florence Nightingale Faculty of Nursing, Midwifery and Palliative Care =

Academic faculty

Coordinates: 51.5049°N 0.1126°W

Florence Nightingale Faculty of Nursing, Midwifery & Palliative Care King's College London
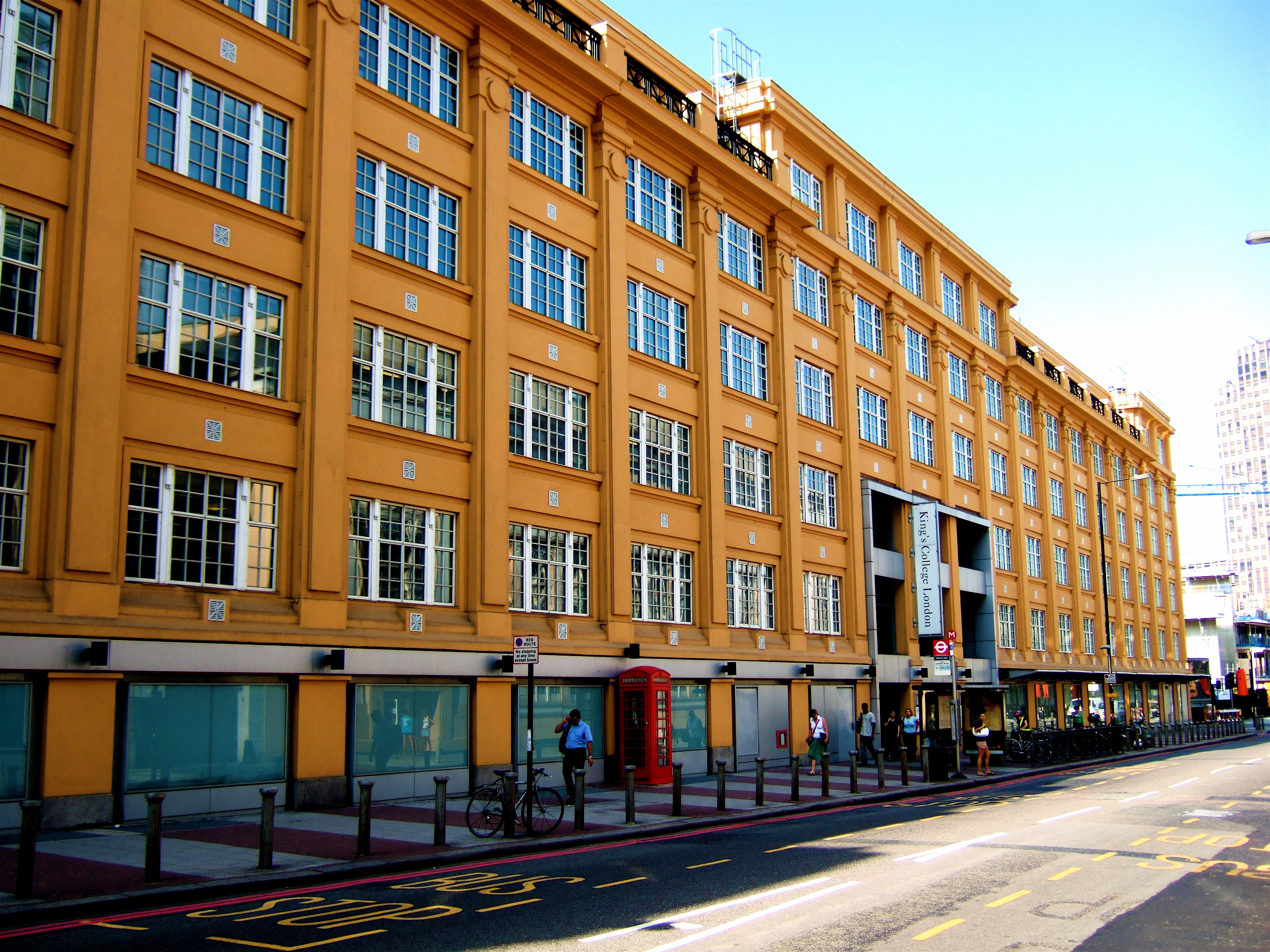
- Former names: – The Nightingale Training School and Home for Nurses – Nightingale School of Nursing – Florence Nightingale School of Nursing and Midwifery
- Established: 9 July 1860; 166 years ago
- Parent institution: King's College London
- Executive Dean: Richard Harding
- Location: James Clerk Maxwell Building; 57 Waterloo Road; London, England; SE1 8WA
- Website: www.kcl.ac.uk/nmpc
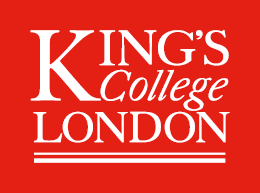

The Florence Nightingale Faculty of Nursing, Midwifery & Palliative Care is an academic faculty within King's College London. The faculty is the world's first nursing school to be continuously connected to a fully serving hospital and medical school (St. Thomas' Hospital). Established on 9 July 1860 by Florence Nightingale, the founder of modern nursing, it was a model for many similar training schools through the UK, Commonwealth and other countries for the latter half of the 19th century. The faculty is based on the Waterloo campus on the South Bank of the River Thames and at the Cicely Saunders Institute on the Denmark Hill campus.

The faculty provides education including continuing professional development and postgraduate research programmes. It also carries out research across nursing, midwifery, palliative care, rehabilitation and related health and care fields.

The faculty specialises in the following areas: child and adolescent nursing; midwifery and women's health; adult nursing; mental health nursing; and postgraduate research, with programmes catering to the needs of a wider range of individuals and healthcare professionals continuing their professional development.

== History ==
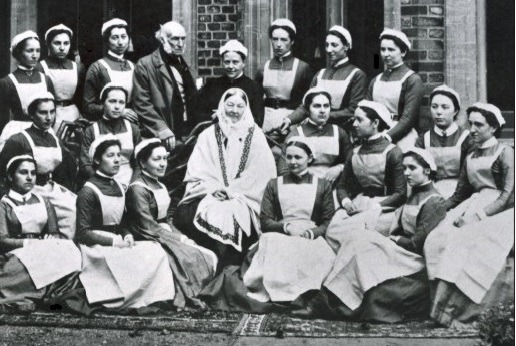
Florence Nightingale posing with her class of nurses from St. Thomas' Hospital. Also on the photo is Sir Harry Verney, an active supporter of the nursing school.

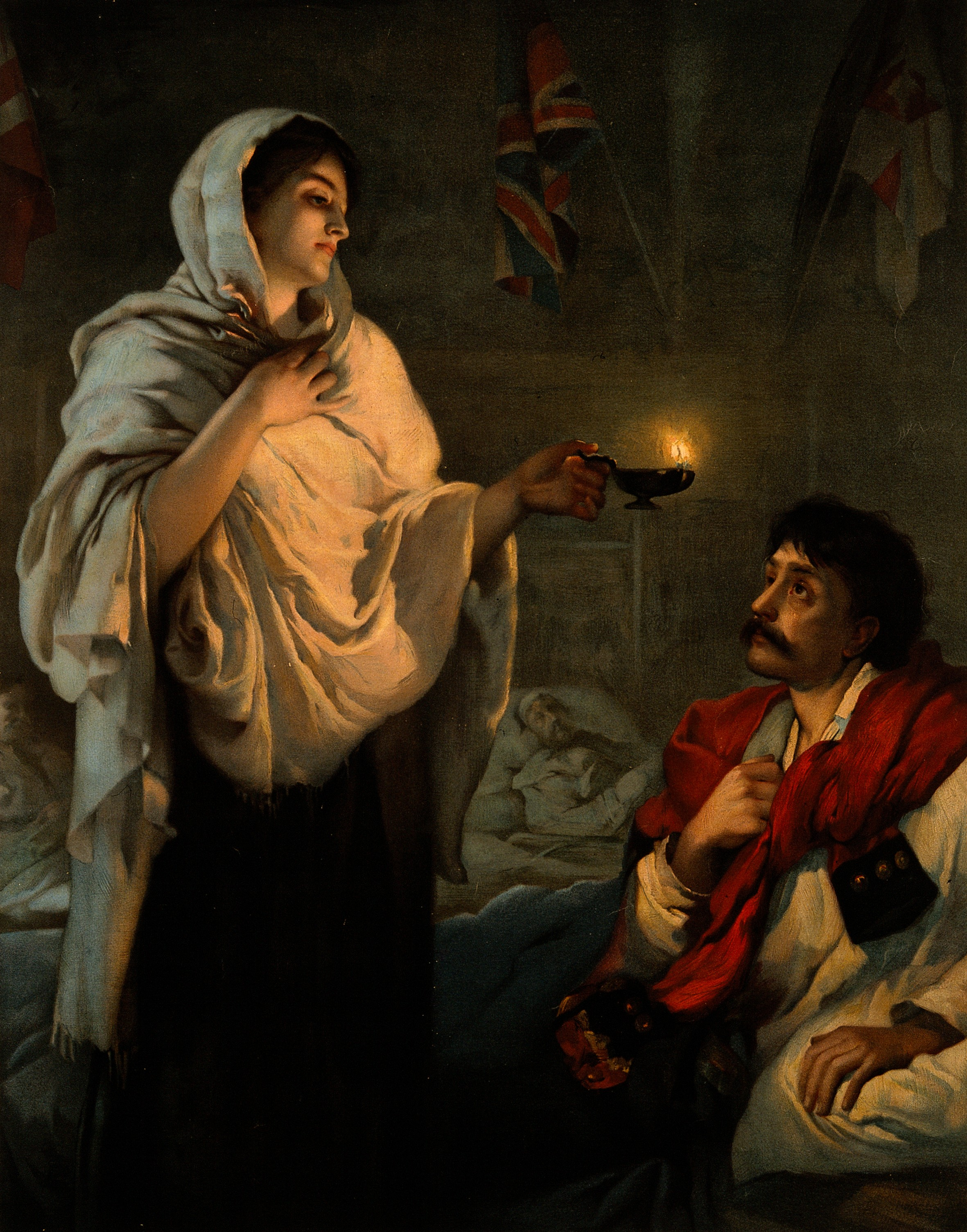
Florence Nightingale, depicted in this popular lithograph reproduction of The Lady with the Lamp as painted by Henrietta Rae, 1891.

Inspired by Florence Nightingale and her nurses' work during the Crimean War, a fund was set up in 1855 by members of the public to raise money for her work. By June 1856, £44,039 (equivalent to over £4.26 million in 2016) was raised. Nightingale decided to use the money to set up a training school at St Thomas' Hospital. The first nurses began their training on 9 July 1860. Graduates of the school used to be called 'Nightingales'.

When Nightingale's school for nurses was initially set up, under the direction of Mrs Wardroper, the hospital matron, the students had a typical training period lasting a year. Students normally lived in-house; whilst having their own private rooms, a common room for lounge or socials was provided in the hospital's special area. The students attended their classes/patients at St. Thomas' Hospital. Around twenty to thirty students were accepted in a year, whose probationary period fall under two classifications. A common class woman who serves as student, upon completion, would receive a certain small amount of money plus a placement in a home or institution. An upper-class woman or 'Lady', on the other hand, would have completed some education and would be given the opportunity to assist in the school. Uniforms were provided at any case, and they would be under the charge of a matron (and an assistant). Upon graduation, they would be given a chance to visit Florence Nightingale in her South Street apartment, a momentous occasion for few people to meet her in person, especially since Nightingale's profile has been made well-known nationwide after the Crimean War. Nightingale kept extensive notes on all the students in the school, including their 'character'. She placed particular importance upon character; should there be any issue about 'character', the 'certification' of a nurse would be opposed.

Between 1860 and 1903 the school certified 1,907 nurses as having had one year's training. Many of the trainees went on to be matrons or superintendents of nursing. Alicia LLoyd Still became matron of the hospital and superintendent of the Nightingale training school in 1913. She introduced many educational innovations such as: a designated sister tutor, Nightingale medals for high achieving probationers, (designed by Countess Feodora Gleichen), ward charts to record student nurses' learning which were later adopted by other hospitals and the General Nursing Council. Lloyd Still designed and inaugurated the Nightingale Badge in 1925 which was awarded to all students graduating from the school until 1995. Lloyd Still launched the Nightingale Fellowship for all alumni and was the first president in 1928.

Over the years, the training and the school itself went through a series of changes, mergers and expansions. The curriculum for nurses has changed enormously since. Further, in 1991, the school merged with Olive Haydon School of Midwifery and the Thomas Guy & Lewisham School of Nursing, creating the Nightingale and Guy's College of Nursing & Midwifery. The following year the name changed to the Nightingale College of Health. In 1993, it merged with King's College Hospital School of Nursing at Normanby College and formed the Nightingale Institute. In 1996, the institute was fully integrated into King's College London and was combined with the university's Department of Nursing Studies two years later to form the Florence Nightingale Division of Nursing & Midwifery. In 1999 it was renamed the Florence Nightingale School of Nursing and Midwifery. In September 2014 the school changed its name to the "Florence Nightingale Faculty of Nursing and Midwifery". In 2017 the Cicely Saunders Institute at King's moved from the Faculty of Life Sciences & Medicine to join with the Faculty of Nursing & Midwifery. The Faculty was renamed the Florence Nightingale Faculty of Nursing, Midwifery & Palliative Care. As of 2021, the Florence Nightingale Faculty of Nursing, Midwifery & Palliative Care is a faculty of 300 staff and 4,000 students.

== Reputation ==
In the 2027 Complete University Guide, the school is ranked thirteenth for nursing in the United Kingdom and second in the world for nursing in the QS World University Rankings 2026. KCL is considered a leading universities in health services, policy and research in the world.

== Notable alumni, academics and staff ==
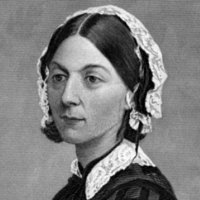
Florence Nightingale

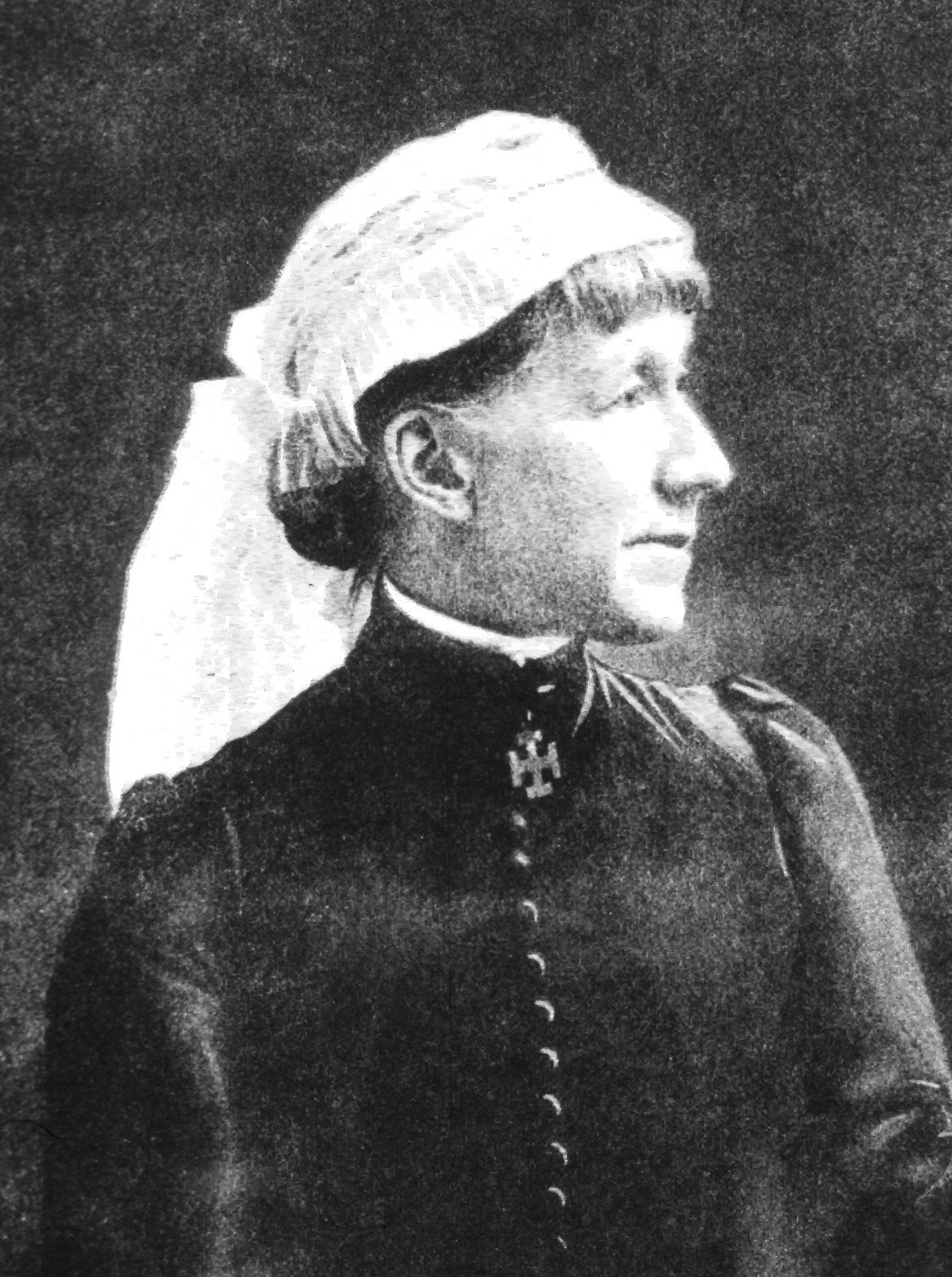
Alice Fisher

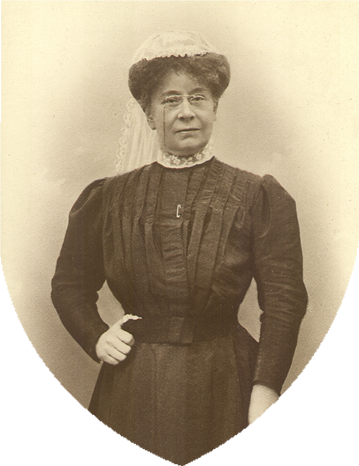
Isla Stewart

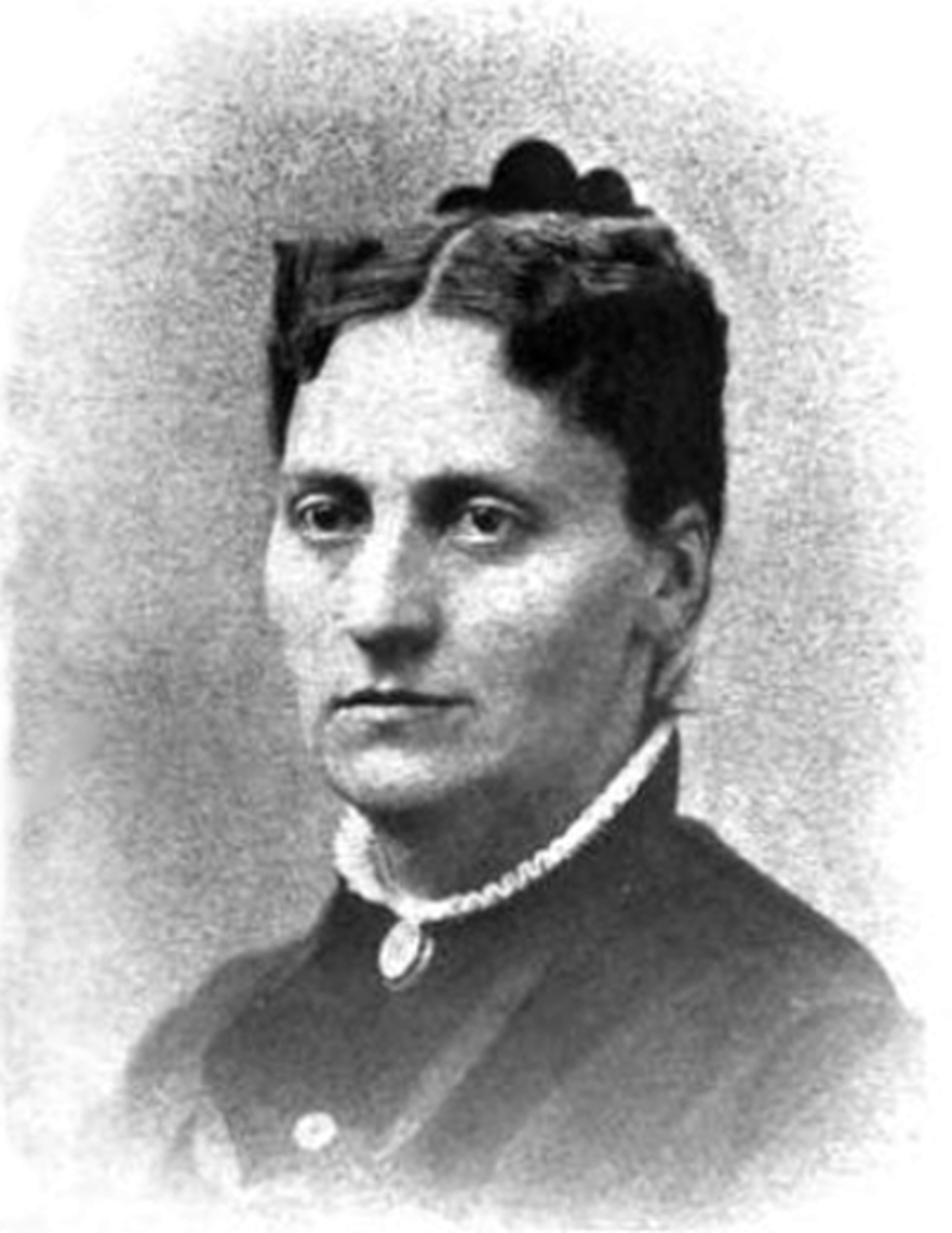
Linda Richards

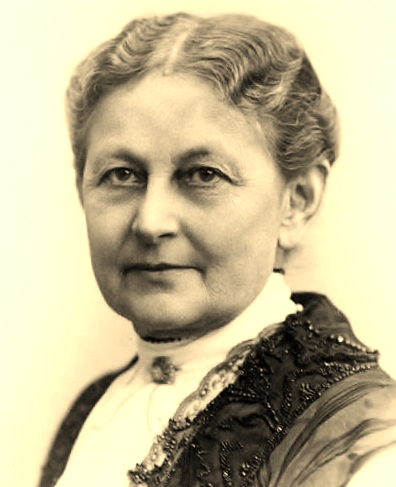
Henny Tscherning

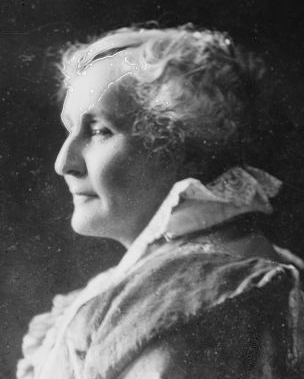
Kate Waller Barrett

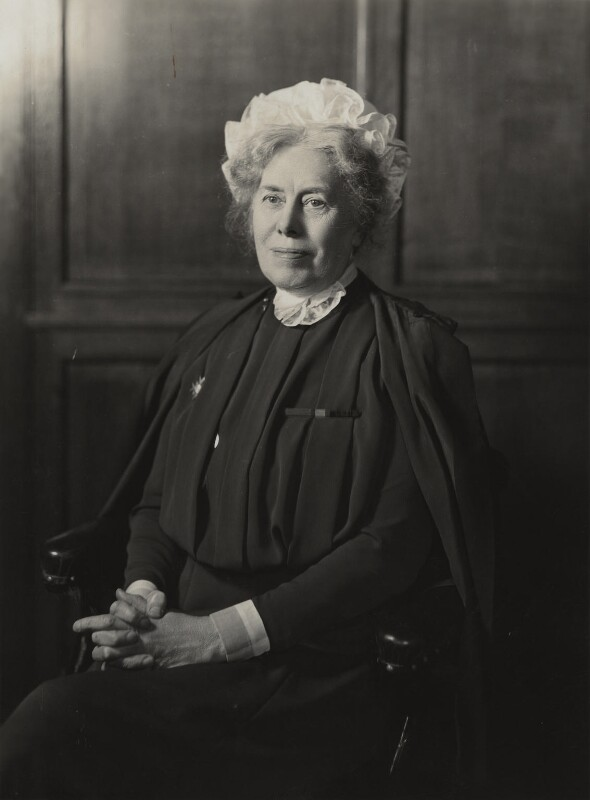
Dame Alicia Lloyd Still

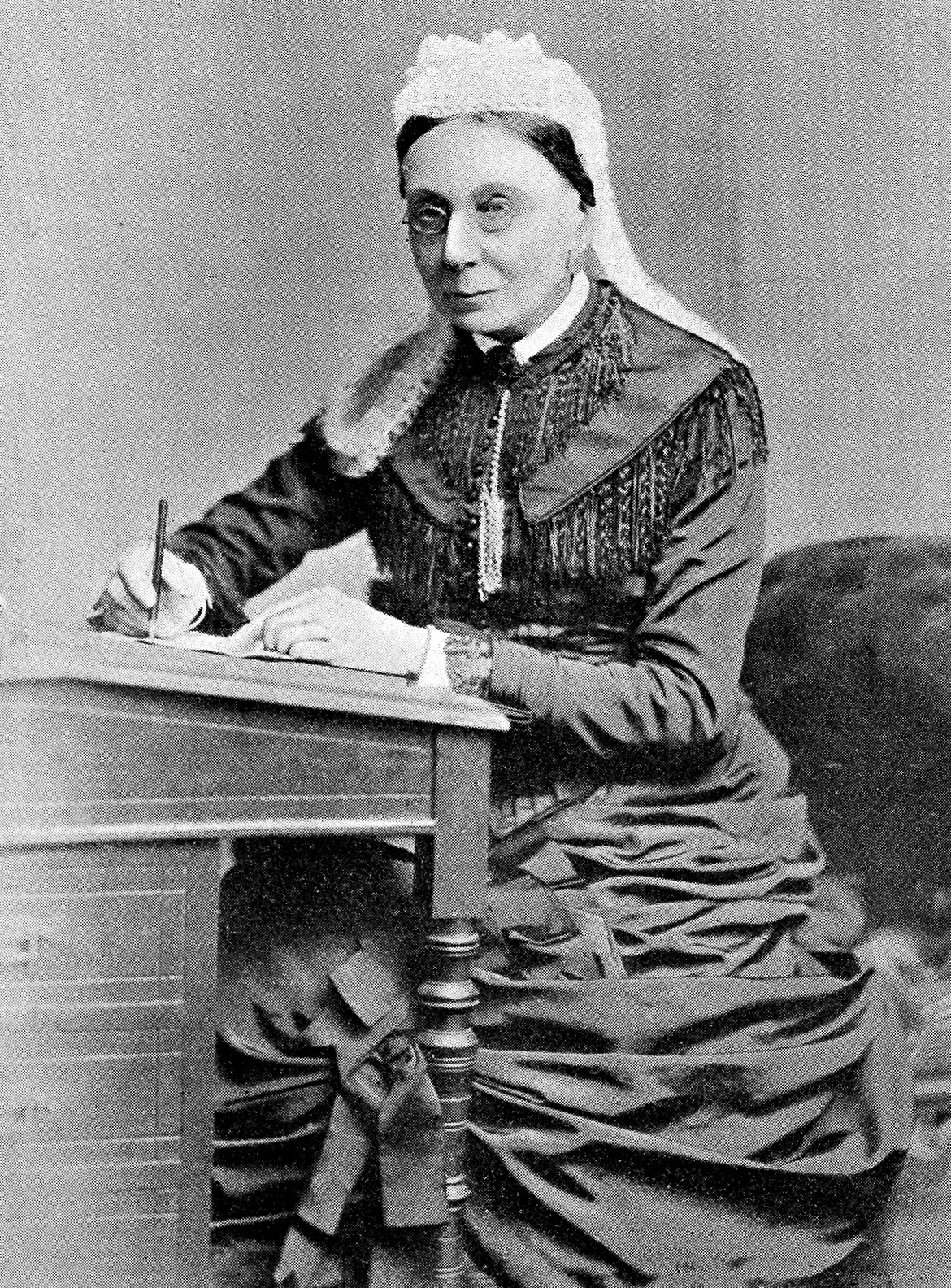
Sarah Elizabeth Wardroper

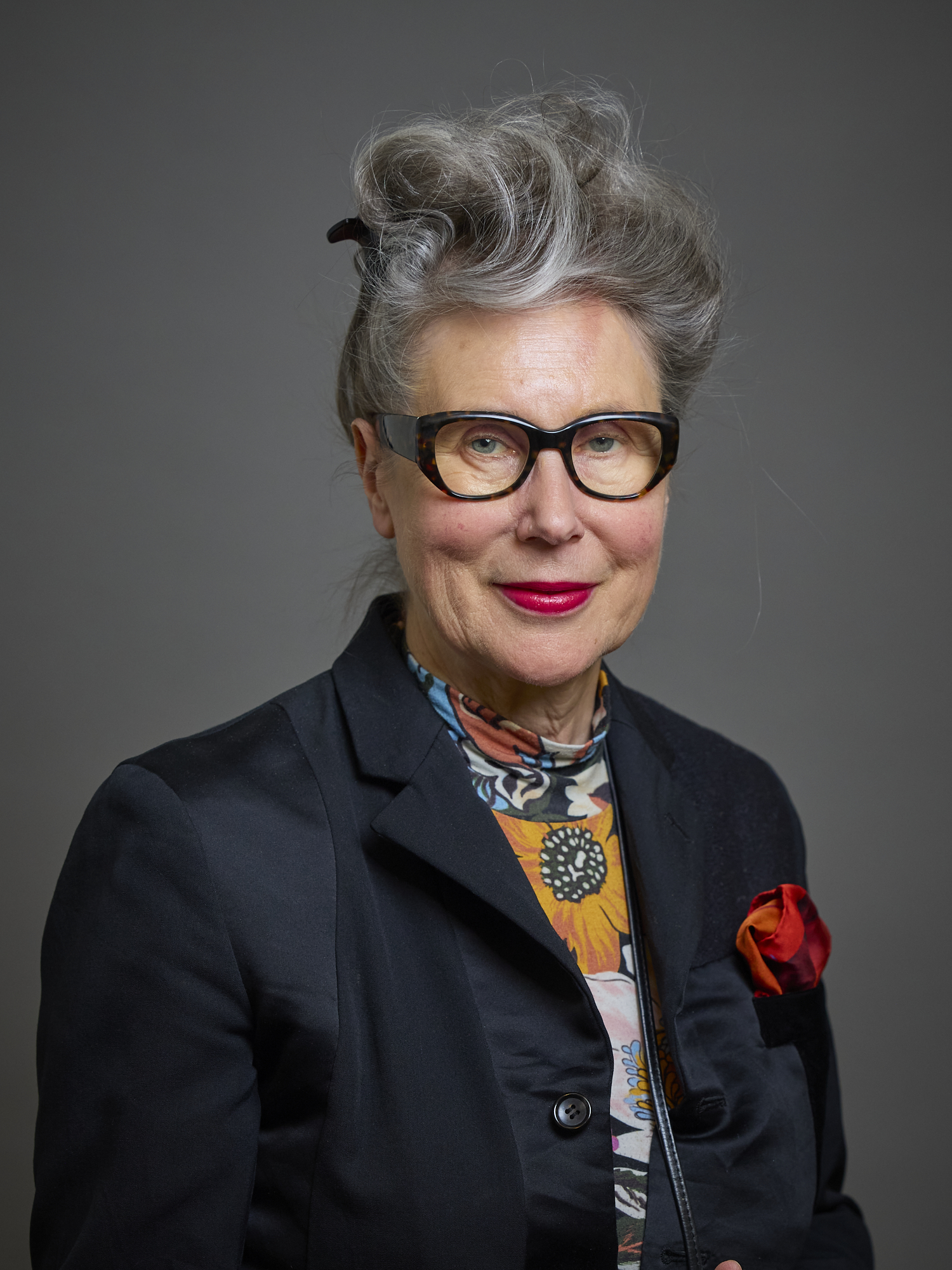
Anne Marie Rafferty

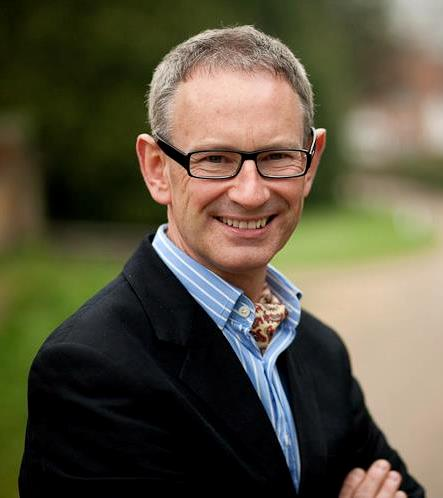
Ian Norman
- Sir Jonathan Asbridge, first president of the UK's Nursing and Midwifery Council and director of Nursing NHS London
- Kate Waller Barrett, prominent Virginia physician, humanitarian, philanthropist, sociologist and social reformer, led the National Florence Crittenton Mission, which she founded in 1895.
- Alice Fisher, a nursing pioneer in the US at the Philadelphia General Hospital
- Elaine Hills-Young, leading nurse and midwife including with the Red Cross in Sudan
- June Jolly, children's nurse and social worker who pioneered care in children's hospitals
- Agnes Jones, became the first trained nursing superintendent of Liverpool Workhouse Infirmary
- Florence Sarah Lees, one of the pioneers of district nursing
- Alicia LLoyd Still, matron of St Thomas Hospital, superintendent of the Nightingale school 1913-1937, and founding member of the Royal College of Nursing
- Baronness Sophie Mannerheim, initially trained as a probationer, eventually becoming a matron and step up a Helsinki training school and later becoming president of the International Council of Nurses
- Dame Sarah Mullaly, she was the youngest ever Chief Nursing Officer, before becoming the first female Archbishop of Canterbury undertool clinicial placements here during her training, and also worked here as a staff nurse.
- Ian Norman, Professor and Dean of the Florence Nightingale Faculty of Nursing and Midwifery at King's College London and Fellow of the Royal College of Nursing and American Academy of Nursing
- Lucy Osburn, regarded as the founder of modern nursing in Australia
- Ella Pirrie, first head nurse of the Belfast City Hospital
- Chief Kofoworola Abeni Pratt, first black nurse in the NHS and subsequently chief nursing officer of Nigeria.
- Anne Marie Rafferty, Professor and former Dean of the Florence Nightingale School of Nursing and Midwifery at King's College London and Fellow of the Royal College of Nursing
- Emmy Rappe, a Swedish nurse who founded the Swedish Nursing Association
- Linda Richards, first professionally trained American nurse and established nursing training programs in US and Japan
- Dame Cecily Saunders, nurse, physician and social worker who established the first modern hospice having instituted St Christopher's Hospice - which kick-started the hospice movement. Saunders was a pioneer of palliative care
- Isla Stewart, a nurse who became the matron of St Bartholomew's Hospital and founded the Royal British Nurses Association
- Dame Alicia Lloyd Still, matron and superintendent of St. Thomas's Hospital 1913-1937, founding member of the College of Nursing (later the Royal College of Nursing), one of the leaders of the campaign for state registration of nurses in the UK, appointed then elected to the General Nursing Council (1920-1937), helped found the Florence Nightingale Museum.
- Henny Tscherning, a Danish nurse who was president of the Danish Nurses' Organization
- Theodora Turner, matron and nurse superintendent of St Thomas' Hospital (especially during its reconstruction period after the German bombing) as well as former president of Royal College of Nursing
- Sarah Elizabeth Wardroper, a matron of St Thomas' Hospital at the time Nightingale instituted the school, she became the school's first superintendent
