= Theodora Turner =

British nurse and hospital matron

- Born: 5 August 1907; Congleton, Cheshire
- Died: 24 August 1999 (aged 92); Wantage, Oxfordshire
- Occupations: nurse, matron

Theodora Turner (5 August 1907 – 24 August 1999) was a British nurse and hospital matron.

== Early years and education ==
Theodora Turner was born on 5 August 1907 in Congleton, Cheshire, one of five children. Her father later became Conservative Party agent in Salisbury where she attended the Godolphin School, Salisbury.

Her parents initially sent her to study at Atholl Crescent, the Edinburgh School of Domestic Science but Turner wished to become a nurse and, with her parents consent, entered St Thomas' Hospital and the Nightingale School of Nursing in the summer of 1929. She completed her training as a nurse with the silver medal, but declined to join the League of St Barnabas, an Anglican society for nurses against the suggestion of the matron, Dame Alicia Lloyd-Still. She took her midwifery training at the Radcliffe Infirmary, Oxford, then returned to St Thomas' Hospital as a ward nursing sister. She completed the International Council of Nurses' course for nurse administrators at Bedford College in 1939.

== Second World War ==
When war broke out in 1939 Turner joined the Queen Alexandra's Imperial Military Nursing Service (QARANC), was mobilised at Congleton. She served on a hospital ship and was present during the evacuation from Dunkirk. In 1942 she was posted to the 56th Division and served in Iran, Egypt and Tripoli. She then served in a Neurological unit in Bari, Italy. Turner was awarded Associate of the Royal Red Cross in recognition of her distinguished service in Italy.

== Later career ==
On her return to civilian life she took up post as administrative sister at St Thomas' Hospital before her appointment as matron of Liverpool's Royal Infirmary in 1948. Turner left in 1953 to care for her elderly parents and took up post of Principal of the Royal College of Nursing's Education Centre in Birmingham.

Turner was appointed matron of St Thomas' Hospital and superintendent of the Florence Nightingale School of Nursing in 1955. She retired in 1965, having contributed to the post-war rebuilding of the hospital and introduced many innovations in nurse education. Turner was an active member of the Nightingale Fellowship (the organisation open to all nurses who trained at the Florence Nightingale School of Nursing).

Turner was an active member of the Royal College of Nursing and elected member of Council (1950–53). She was a Royal College of Nursing representative on the Whitley Council which negotiated nurses' salaries. After retiring, she became president of the RCN (1966-1968). She later relocated to Scotland, where she served on the Argyll and Clyde Health Board.

== Awards ==
ARRC 1944

OBE 1960

== Death ==
Theodora Turner died at Wantage, Oxfordshire, aged 92, from old age.

== Curriculum vitae ==
- ARRC, 1944
- Education Officer, Education Centre, Royal College of Nursing, Birmingham, 1953–55
- Matron, St Thomas' Hospital and Superintendent, Nightingale Training School, 1955–65
- President, Royal College of Nursing, 1966–68
