= Henny Tscherning =

Danish nurse and trade unionist (1853–1932)

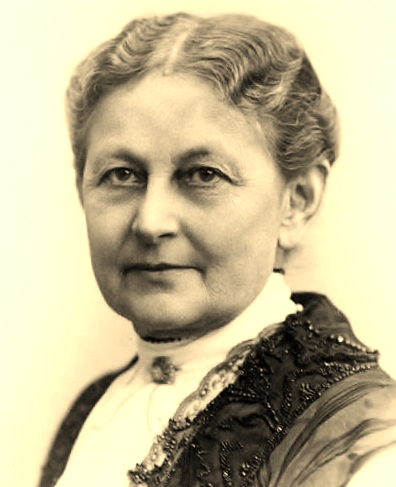
Henny Tscherning

Henriette "Henny" Tscherning (née Schultz; 5 March 1853 – 6 August 1932) was a pioneering Danish nurse and trade unionist who headed the Danish Nurses' Organization for 28 years (1899–1927). She introduced a three-year nurses training programme culminating in an examination which provided official state authorization for nurses to take up work.

== Early life and education ==
Born on 5 March 1853 in Copenhagen, Tscherning was the daughter of postal inspector Theodor Schultz and his wife Anna Margrathe Ipsen. She was raised in a well-to-do home, one of a family of 10 children. Drawn by the trends of the time, rather than become a housewife, when she was 24 she left home to be trained as a nurse. As there were no established formal training courses for nurses as the time, in 1878 she started as an apprentice at the Municipal Hospital in Copenhagen, working under the head physician Andreas Brünniche and matron Margaret Bahnson. The following year she was appointed chief nurse in a surgical department.

== Career ==
On returning from a course at the Nightingale School at St Thomas' Hospital, London, in 1883 she tried to rally Danish support for the training course established by Florence Nightingale, which had both practical and theoretical components. She initially received little backing for her proposals but after marrying the surgeon Eilert Adam Tscherning in 1886, she was able to draw attention to the need for formal training as well as for official recognition of nursing as a profession. Although she spent several years at home raising her four children, in 1891 she finally published Om spæde Børns kunstige Ernæring efter den Soxhletske Metode (On Fledgling Children's Artificial Nutrition Following the Soxhlet Method). In 1899, after being invited to stand as a candidate for the newly formed Danish Nurses' Organization, she was elected president at the first general meeting, replacing Charlotte Norrie who had occupied the post for only a few months. Tscherning made her position clear in 1903 when she announced: "Nurses should also have a right to participate in decisions on how their work is to be organized. Work must be made more independent for them."

She became an active trade unionist, at a time when the requirements of nurses were usually in the hands of male doctors. Over her 27 years as president, she brought about important changes, encouraging the nurses to fight together for improvements in their working conditions. One of her greatest achievements was to systematize the training of nurses, proposing a three-year compulsory course covering both practice and theory. Those who were successful in the examination at the end of the course, received official authorization to begin work. In 1921, she also introduced courses for senior nurses. Under Tscherning's leadership, in 1926 Charlotte Munck published her Haandbog i Sygepleje (Nursing Handbook), a textbook describing all aspects of training. The three-year course and the official examination for authorization to practise came only in 1933, a year after Tscherning's death.

== Achievements ==
Among Tscherning's other achievements within the nurses organization were the establishment of a sickness insurance scheme (1901), a funeral fund (1905) and an old-age pension fund (1919). In 1930, she laid the foundation stone for Sygeplejerskernes Hus, a home for retired nurses. She was a resident there herself shortly after it was completed. She was also successful in convincing nurses that their future lay in grouping together as members of a trade union (the Danish Nurses' Organization) where their aspirations would be effectively presented and recognized. In addition to her work in Denmark, Tscherning was elected President of the International Council of Nurses from 1915 to 1922. In 1920, she was a co-founder of Sygeplejerskers Samarbejde in Norden (Nurses Nordic Cooperative). She retired from the Danish Nurses' Organization in 1927.

Tscherning earned widespread respect both in Denmark and abroad as an effective organiser, a discreet politician and a strong leader in the early years of the Danish Nurses' Organization. She gained the support of her colleagues, always showing appreciation of good work, and was expert in choosing assistants who could help her achieve results, both during her term as president and after she had retired.

Henny Tscherning died in Copenhagen on 6 August 1932 and is buried in Hornbæk Cemetery. In 1909, she had left her husband Eilert Adam Tschering, with whom she had four children: Ellen Meggy (1887), Anton Frederik (1888), Karen (1890) and Gudrun (1893).
