= Friends' Almshouse of Philadelphia =

Historical charitable institute in Philadelphia

Coordinates: 39.9471°N 75.1473°W

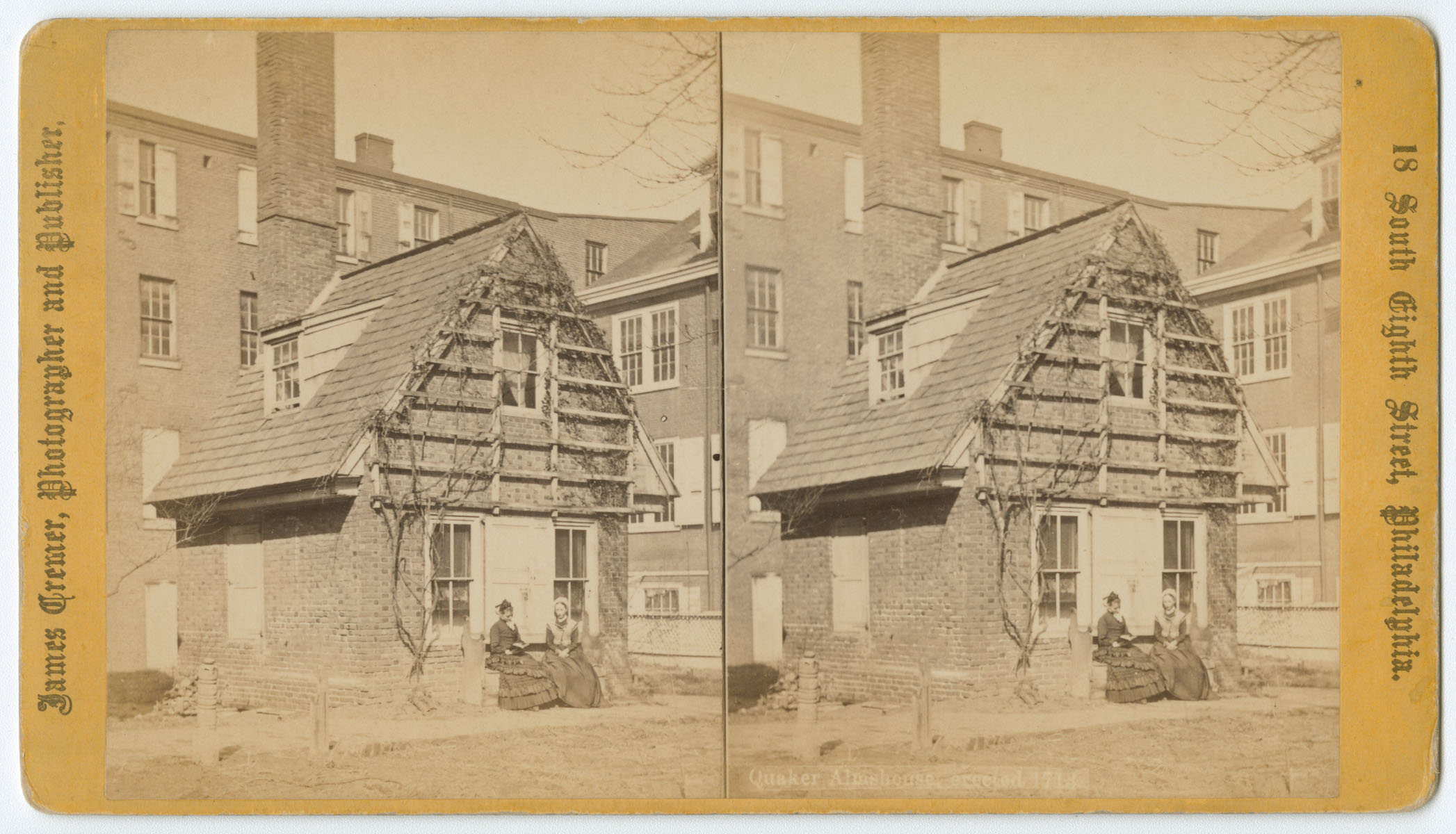
Stereograph of the Quaker Almshouse cottage, Walnut Street, Philadelphia, ca. 1876. Two women sit on a bench in front of the cottage. Erected along with six other homes in 1713 as free housing for the poor of the Philadelphia Monthly Meeting of the Religious Society of Friends, the cottage was demolished in 1876.

The Friends' Almshouse of Philadelphia was founded in 1713 by the city's Quaker leadership to help destitute members of the Society of Friends, although people of other creeds were sometimes admitted. As such, this was the first institution in America to care for poor citizens. The combination poorhouse and workhouse occupied two small buildings built especially for it on the south side of Walnut Street between Third and Fourth Streets. The houses were augmented with a substantial brick building fronting Walnut Street in 1729.

Not to be confused with the city-run Philadelphia Almshouse (established in 1732), the Quaker Almshouse provided food, housing, work and perhaps even modest healthcare for the indigent until 1841 when it was demolished, although one of the original houses lasted into the 1870s. Today, the Catholic Heritage Center stands on the site.
