= Alice Fisher (nurse) =

American nurse

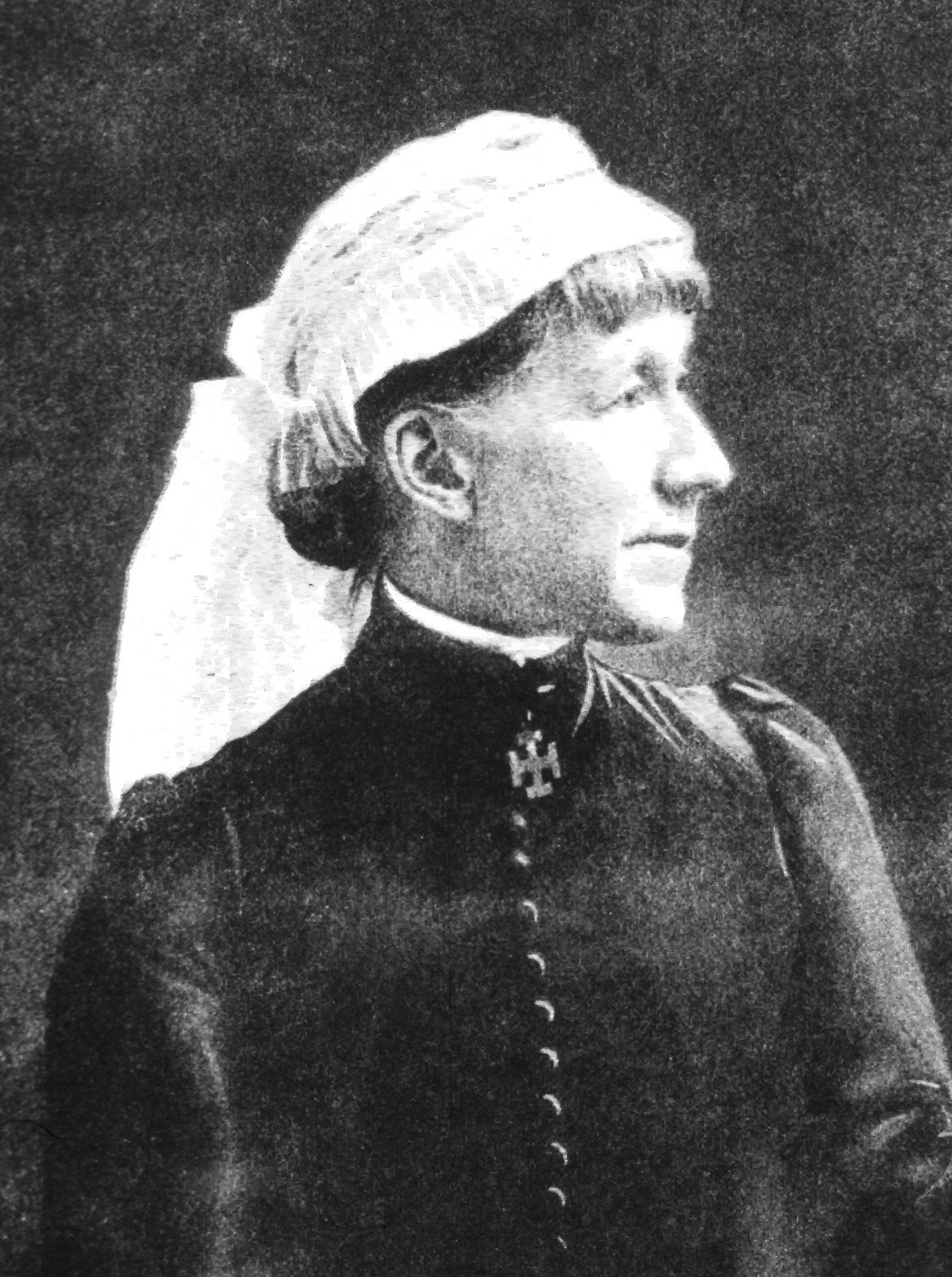
- Born: 13 June 1839; England
- Died: 2 June 1888 (aged 48)
- Resting place: The Woodlands (Philadelphia, Pennsylvania)
- Education: Nightingale Training School and Home for Nurses, London, England
- Employer: Philadelphia General Hospital
- Known for: Nursing reform

Alice Fisher (13 June 1839 – 2 June 1888) was a nursing pioneer. During her brief career at the Philadelphia General Hospital (PGH) she improved the standards of care at the institution and created the hospital's nursing school.

== Early life ==
Fisher's father was both an astronomer, at the Royal Observatory, Greenwich, and a priest. Fisher was born in England. Before leaving home she wrote two novels, Too Bright to Last, 1873, and a three-volume His Queen, which was published in 1875. In 1874, after her father's death in 1873, she started training as a nurse at the Nightingale Training School and Home for Nurses, now part of King's College London.

== Career ==
After completing her training, she nursed briefly at two hospitals, the Edinburgh Royal Infirmary and the Fever Hospital in Newcastle upon Tyne. She then became superintendent, also briefly, at three other British hospitals, where she made significant improvements in the standard of nursing: Addenbrooke's, at Cambridge; the Birmingham General Hospital, where she instituted a nursing school; and the Radcliffe Infirmary, Oxford, where she instituted lectures for the nursing staff. With a fellow Nightingale nurse, Rachel Williams, she produced an early book on nursing, Hints to Hospital Nurses.

Fisher made occasional visits to her mentor, Florence Nightingale. The two corresponded; letters Fisher wrote to Nightingale on conditions in her posts are at the British Library, but Nightingale's letters have not been found.

She moved to the United States in 1884 and was appointed Superintendent at the Philadelphia General Hospital, also known as the Blockley Hospital. She was charged with transforming nursing and medical care at the deteriorated institution, where she instituted dramatic improvement in standards of care, and created the hospital's nursing school.

== Death ==
She died of heart disease in 1888, only 13 years after starting training, but had been very productive; her obituary in the British Medical Journal said that during her time at PGH "an impetus was given to the improvement of nursing which has been felt almost throughout the United States". Her burial site at The Woodlands Cemetery lies adjacent to the former hospital grounds and, for decades, was the site of a procession of nursing students from PGH and other hospitals in the region.

== Bibliography ==
- http://www.aahn.org/gravesites/fisher.html
- Cope, Zachary. Six Disciples of Florence Nightingale. London: Pitman Medical 1961 57–74.
- O’Donnell, Donna Gentile. Provider of Last Resort: The Story of the Closure of the Philadelphia General Hospital. Camino Books, Philadelphia, 1995.
- Lynaugh, Joan E., “Alice Fisher (1839-1888),” Oxford Dictionary of National Biography.
- McDonald, Lynn. “Alice Fisher,” in Lynn McDonald, ed., Florence Nightingale on Extending Nursing. Waterloo ON: Wilfrid Laurier University Press 2009:908-09.
- Smith, Marion E. “The Pioneer Work of Alice Fisher in Philadelphia,” American Journal of Nursing 4,10 (July 1904):803-09. Agnes Jones.
