= Blockley Almshouse =

Defunct hospital in Pennsylvania, United States

Coordinates: 39.94406°N 75.19618°W

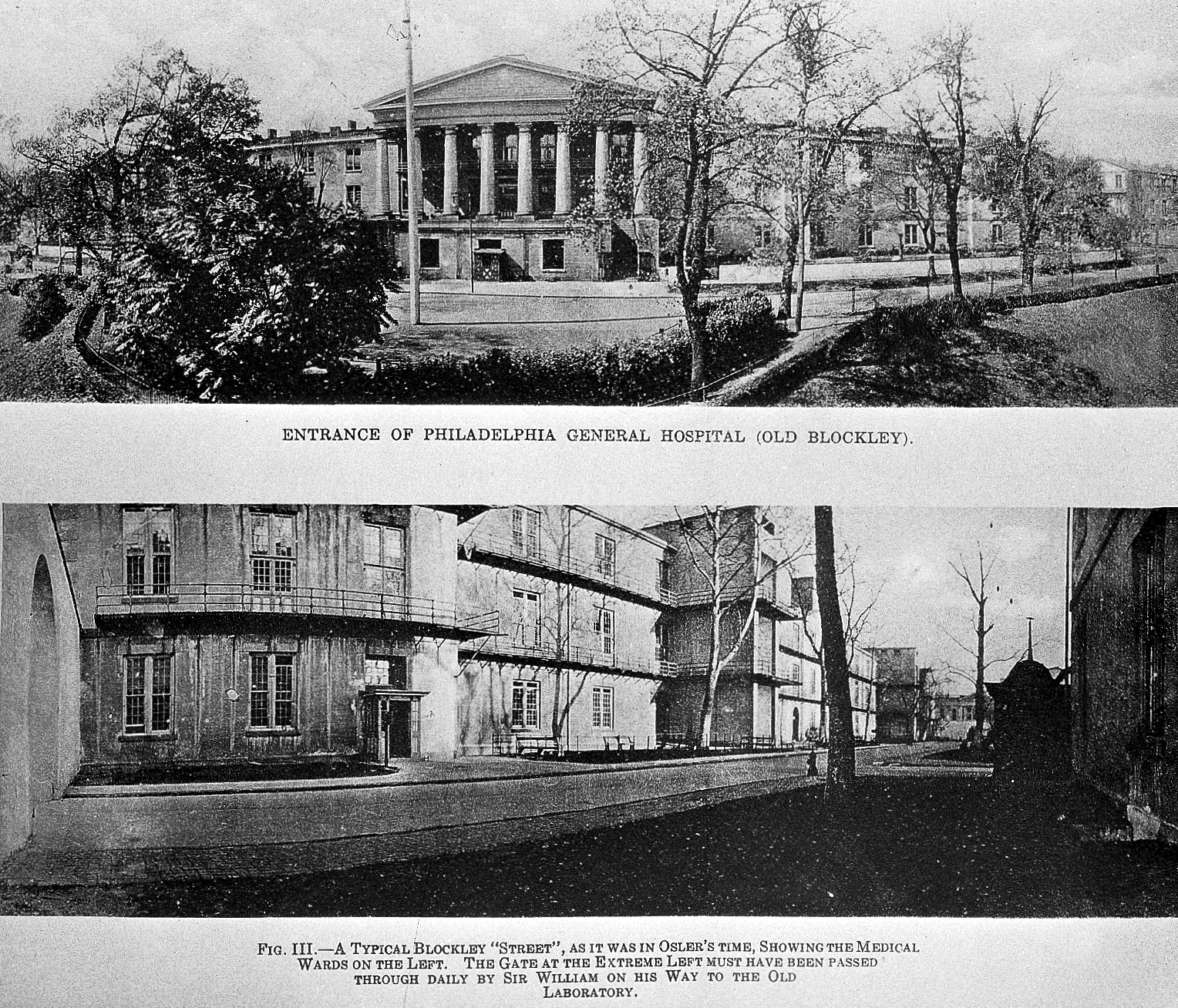
Entrance of Philadelphia General Hospital (Old Blockley)

The Blockley Almshouse, later known as Philadelphia General Hospital, was a charity hospital and poorhouse located in West Philadelphia. It originally opened in 1732/33 in a different part of the city as the Philadelphia Almshouse (not to be confused with the Friends' Almshouse, established 1713). Philadelphia General Hospital closed in 1977.

== History ==
=== Origins ===
The Blockley Almshouse had its roots in the Philadelphia Almshouse, a facility first located in the block between Third, fifth, Spruce and Pine Streets. Constructed in 1731–32, this institution provided the first government-sponsored care of the poor in America, as it offered an infirmary and hospital for the sick and insane, besides housing and feeding the impoverished.

In 1767, it moved to larger quarters occupying the block between Tenth, Eleventh, Spruce and Pine Streets. This site was officially called the Philadelphia Bettering House.

=== Old Blockley ===
In 1835, the overcrowded Philadelphia Almshouse moved to Blockley Township in West Philadelphia, an area once known as "Blockley Farm" now between 34th Street and University Avenue. Built to house a variety of Philadelphia's indigent population, the facility consisted of a quadrangle of four sizable buildings including a poorhouse, a hospital, an orphanage, and an insane asylum. Construction of the first building had begun in 1830, with its cornerstone laid on May 26. William Strickland was the architect and Samuel Sloan, later to be a well-known architect, worked as journeyman carpenter on the project.

The institution was later renamed the Philadelphia Almshouse and Hospital, but it was commonly called "Old Blockley" for decades after. Operated by a city committee known as the Guardians of the Poor, Blockley's early reputation for care was dismal. In 1864, the "Female Lunatic Asylum" building was accidentally destroyed by workers installing heaters, killing 18 women and injuring another 20. Blockley's geographical isolation from city medical institutions limited clinical care until the University of Pennsylvania, with its medical school, moved to a site just north of the Almshouse grounds in 1871.

As the latter 19th century saw advancements in both medicine and psychiatry, Blockley's mission gradually embraced that of a more conventional public hospital. A nursing school was opened at the site in 1885 under the direction of Alice Fisher, replacing ad hoc patient nurses with a system of skilled nursing. In 1903, operations of the hospital were turned over to the newly created Bureau of Hospitals in the Philadelphia Department of Public Health. In 1906, the insane were moved to the Byberry Mental Hospital, later known as the Philadelphia State Hospital.

=== Philadelphia General Hospital ===
"Old Blockley" was renamed Philadelphia General Hospital (PGH) in 1919. In the next few decades, the original almshouse buildings were gradually replaced with modern facilities. By the 1950s the site contained the city's public hospital, as well as a nursing home and a home for the indigent.

In 1952, the new City Home Rule Charter placed the control of Philadelphia General Hospital with a board of trustees. Under contracts signed in 1959, care at PGH was carried out by the medical schools of Temple University and the University of Pennsylvania, who subcontracted work to Jefferson Medical College, Woman's Medical College of Pennsylvania, and Hahnemann Medical School.

By the early 1970s, public support including Medicaid allowed private hospitals to expand treatment for the poor. Facing both financial difficulties as well as a stock of aging buildings, the board of PGH closed the hospital entirely in 1977.

== Location ==
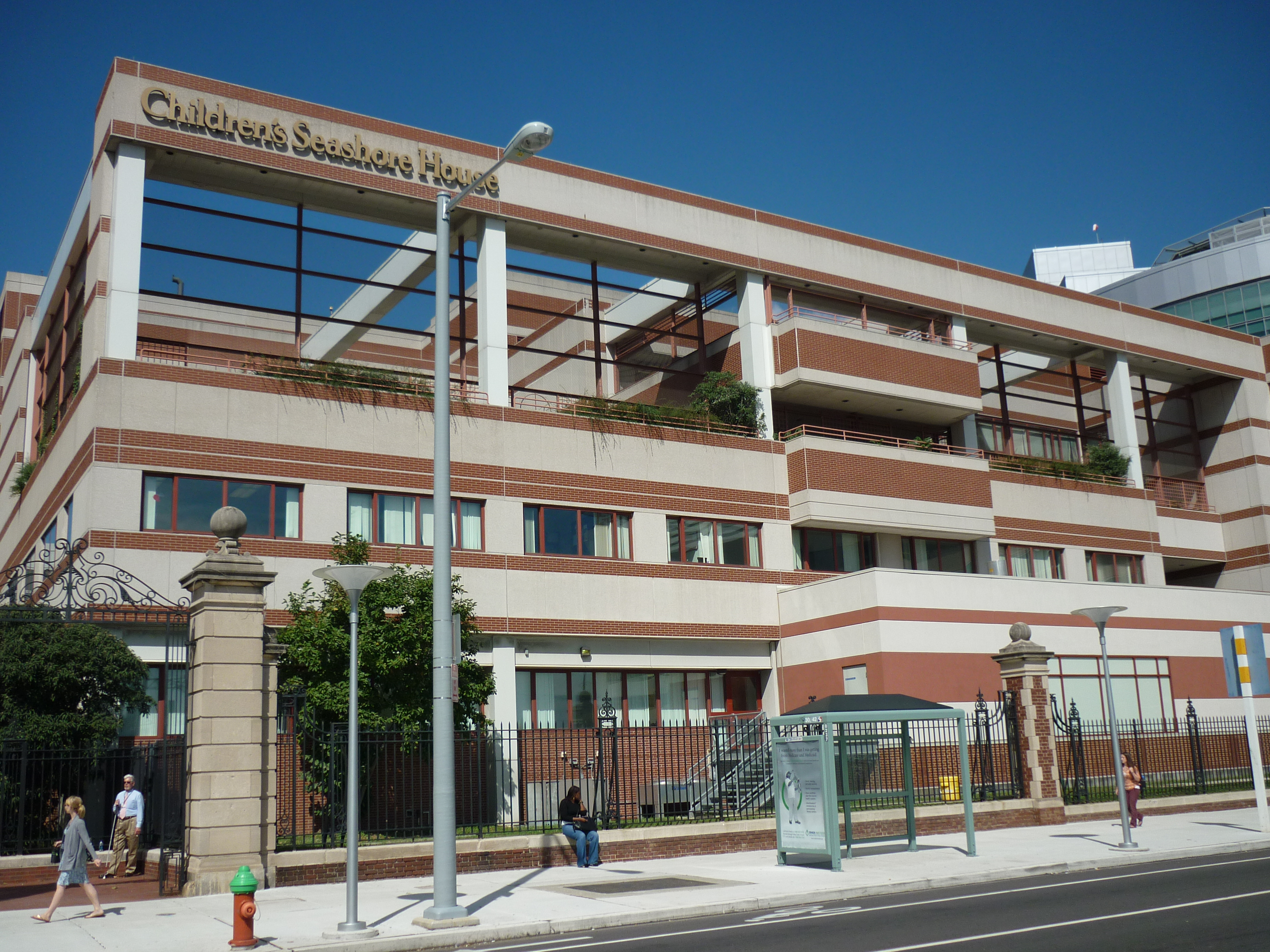
2009 photo shows Children's Seashore House (CHoP) & a portion of the PGH era brick, limestone & ironwork wall.

The Almshouse was built by the city in what was then known as Blockley Township, on land purchased from the Andrew Hamilton estate. This parcel of land stretched from what are now known as Civic Center Boulevard to Guardian Drive and from University Avenue to 34th Street. A blue historical marker was erected on Curie Boulevard commemorating the significance of the site.

Today the site is occupied by parts of Children's Hospital of Philadelphia, University of Pennsylvania Health System, and the Veterans Health Administration and represents a major center of medical research and care in Philadelphia. The Penn Museum also stands on former Almshouse grounds. A long brick wall topped by an ornately decorated iron fence that dates back to PGH still forms part of the southern and western boundaries of the site.

In 2001, more than 1,000 bodies associated with the Almshouse were recovered from an adjacent construction site and reburied in nearby Woodlands Cemetery.
