= Florence Sarah Lees =

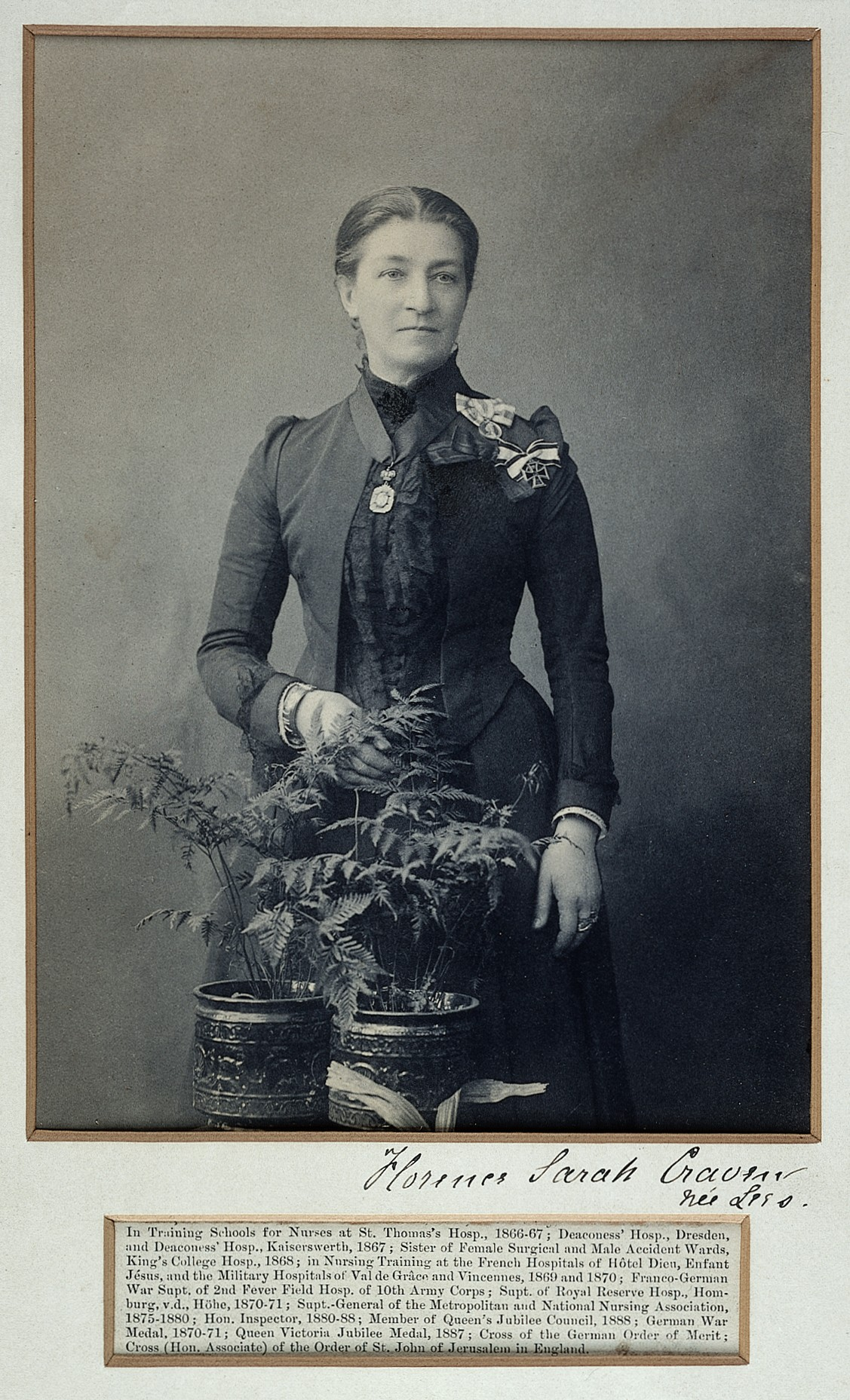
Florence Sarah Craven, Mrs Dacre Craven, née Lees. Photograph.

Florence Sarah Lees (31 March 1840 – 19 October 1922) was one of the English pioneers of district nursing.

== Early life ==
Florence Sarah Lees, later Craven, was raised in the south coast town of St Leonards-on-Sea, East Sussex—largely by her mother and an older half-brother after the desertion of her father, a doctor. She was brought up in privileged circumstances, but (for Lees) with great restraints. She was well educated, at home; her half-brother was an Oxford don, who died in 1872. When she wanted to train as a nurse her mother would allow her only to enter St Thomas’ Hospital as an ”observer,” not a regular “probationer.” She next travelled in Europe, gaining experience at the deaconess institutions of Dresden and Kaiserswerth. She consistently refused Florence Nightingale's entreaties to take up workhouse infirmary nursing.

== Nursing ==
In 1869, with arrangements made by Nightingale, Lees went to Paris to gain experience of French hospitals. She was there when the Franco-Prussian War broke out in 1870 and spent a short time nursing at a French Army hospital near Metz, and wrote a short account of the experience. At the request of the crown princess of Prussia, on Nightingale's recommendation, she then went to nurse at a small hospital near the palace at Homburgh, to which the crown princess gave her personal attention. This resulted in a lifelong friendship with the crown princess, Lees was awarded a German war medal and cross of the German Order of Merit. After the war, Nightingale sent her a copy of her Introductory Notes on Lying-in Institutions with an inscription: “My dear warrior friend.”

Lees produced the first nursing book by one of Nightingale's protégées when she published (with a lot of help from Nightingale on the writing) A Handbook for Hospital Sisters, in 1873. Dr Henry Acland wrote a preface for it.

Liverpool philanthropist and advocate of nursing William Rathbone asked Lees to visit hospitals in the United States and Canada, which she did in 1873–74. Nightingale assisted with the introductions. Lees's reports back, however, including very consideration of nursing in Canada, were not published. She did more work for Rathbone back in England, now on the agencies for district nursing (or nursing people in their homes). This led to her first real position in 1875, when she became the first superintendent of the newly formed Metropolitan and National Nursing Association for Providing Trained Nurses for Visiting the Sick Poor at their Own Homes. (The name was later shortened: Metropolitan and National Nursing Association.) The Nightingale Fund assisted it financially, and Henry Bonham Carter, its secretary, became a member of the new council. Nightingale considered that Lees was the person who "really invented district nursing.” She frequently quoted her on the need to “nurse the home” as well as the patient.

In 1879 Florence Lees married a Church of England priest, the Rev Dacre Craven (1832-1922), rector of St George the Martyr, Queen Square, who himself took up the cause of district nursing. Marriage, however, according to the mores of the time, required Lees to give away her salary, although she continued in the position until the birth of her first child. Two sons were born, the first Waldemar Sigismund Dacre Craven (1880-1928), named after the two sons of the crown princess of Prussia who died in infancy. The second, Harry Lees Dacre Craven (1883-1917), was killed in action in World War I, the older son committed suicide in 1928. The crown princess and Nightingale were godmothers.

Mrs Craven considered going to nurse in the Anglo-Zulu War, but did not. In 1900 she asked Nightingale about going to South Africa for the Boer War, but again did not go.

Florence Craven published her second book, A Guide to District Nurses, dedicated to her mother, in 1889. It had been requested as a training manual for the new program to promote district nursing established to celebrate Queen Victoria's jubilee: Queen's Jubilee Fund, She also published articles on district nursing. Mrs Craven resigned from her post with the Metropolitan and national Association in 1889. In 1890 her husband became a member of the Nightingale Fund Council, to facilitate support of district work.

Florence Lees Craven died in 1922, two months after her husband. There are 188 surviving letters by her to Nightingale, 1868–1900, at the British Library, but only a handful of draft letters by Nightingale's to her.
