= Florence Nightingale Museum =

Museum in London

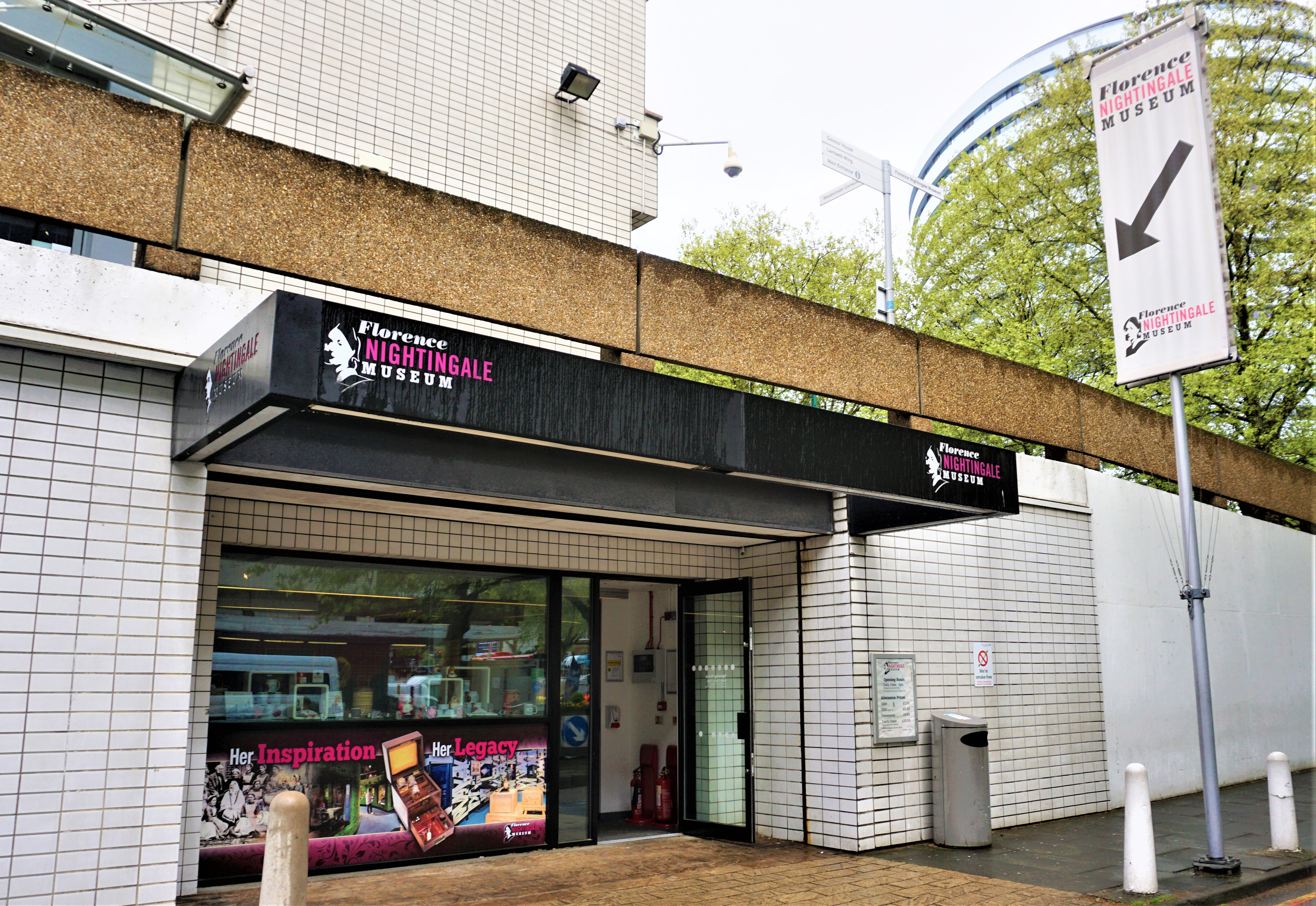
- Museum entrance

- Location within Central London
- Established: 1989; 37 years ago
- Location: Lambeth Palace Road; London, SE1; United Kingdom
- Coordinates: 51.500278°N 0.1175°W
- Owner: The Florence Nightingale Museum Trust
- Public transit access: Waterloo; Waterloo
- Website: florence-nightingale.co.uk

The Florence Nightingale Museum is located at St Thomas' Hospital, which faces the Palace of Westminster across the River Thames in South Bank, central London, England. It is open to the public six days a week, Tuesday to Sunday 10:00am until 5:00pm (last entry at 4:30pm).

The museum tells the real story of Florence Nightingale, "the lady with the lamp", from her Victorian childhood to her experiences in the Crimean, through to her years as an ardent campaigner for health reform. Nightingale is recognised as the founder of modern nursing in the United Kingdom. The new museum explains her legacy and also celebrates nursing today: it is a member of The London Museums of Health & Medicine group.

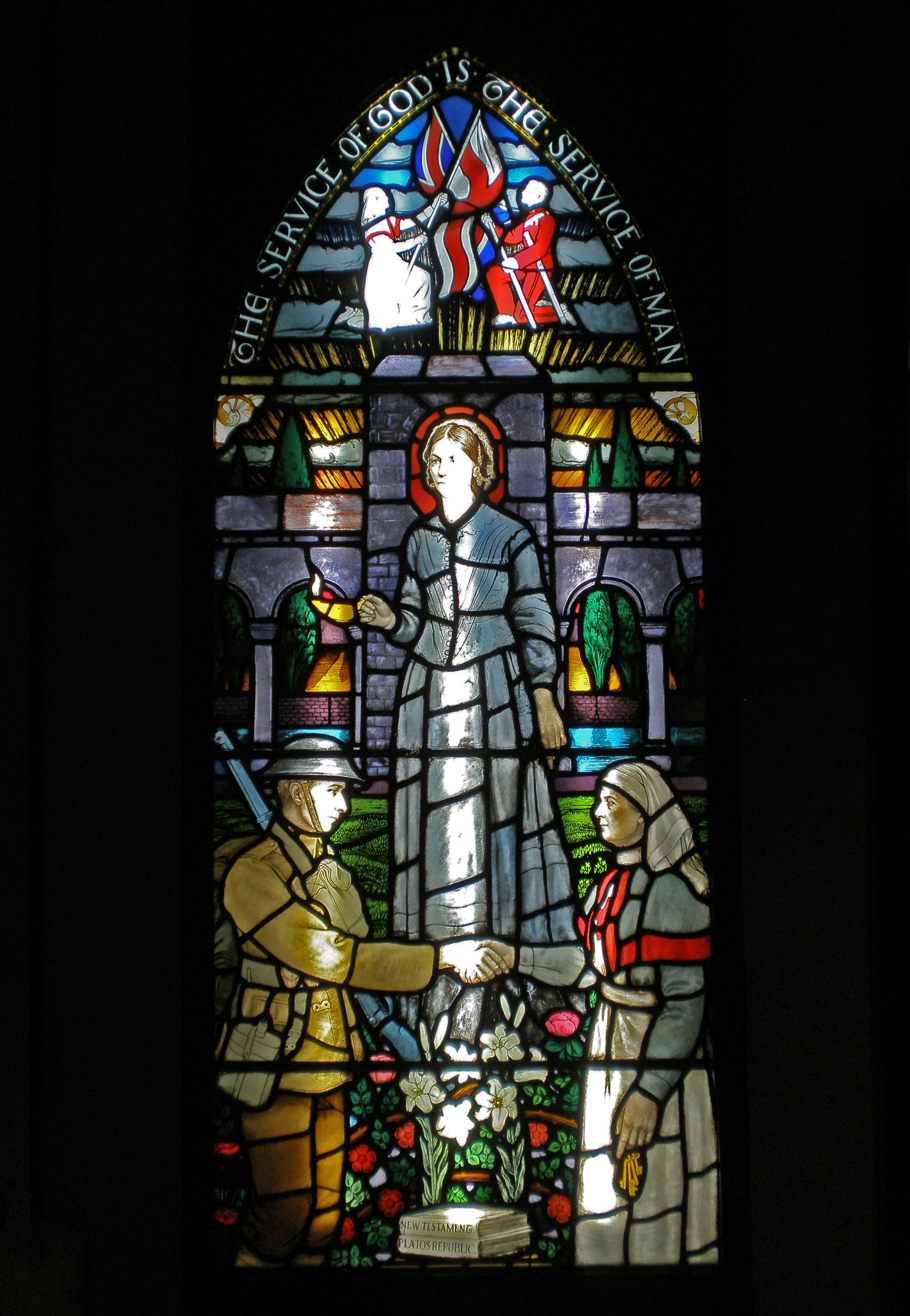
A stained glass window of Nightingale, on display at the museum

In 1860, four years after her famous involvement in the Crimean War, Nightingale founded the Nightingale Training School for nurses at St. Thomas' Hospital and the museum is located on this site.

The new museum is designed around three pavilions that tell her story. The Gilded Cage tells the story of Nightingale's privileged childhood and her struggle against stifling social conventions. The Calling shows how Nightingale and her team coped with the crisis in the military hospitals where the legend of the lady with the lamp was born. Reform and Inspire shows the other side of Nightingale, the reformer who campaigned tirelessly for health reform at home and abroad.

Highlights from the Collection include the writing slate Nightingale used as a child, her pet owl Athena (which she rescued in Athens and hand reared, and which became her constant companion, travelling everywhere in her pocket), and Nightingale's medicine chest, which she took with her to the Crimean. It contains a mix of medicines and herbal remedies, from bicarbonate of soda to powdered rhubarb. The museum displays a rare Register of Nurses that lists women who served under Nightingale in the military hospitals in Turkey and the Crimean.

Interactive exhibits have been created to offer different ways of exploring Florence's story and influence. Free creative activities for children are offered during the holidays.

== See also ==
- Healthcare in London
- Claydon House, a National Trust property in Buckinghamshire, Florence Nightingale's family home and location of a collection of Florence Nightingale memorabilia
