= Sarah Elizabeth Wardroper =

British nurse (1813–1892)

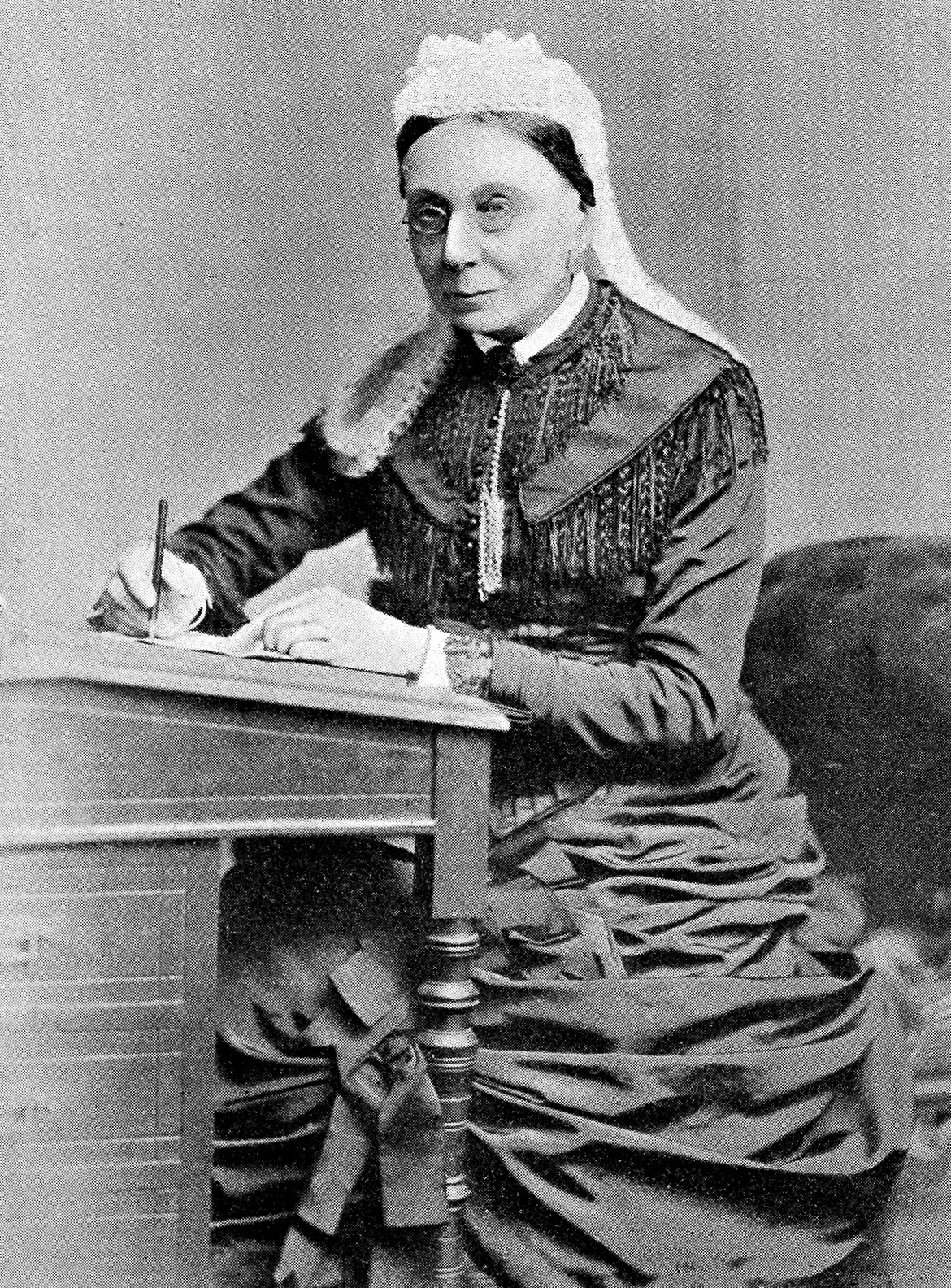
Mrs Wardroper at her desk

Sarah Elizabeth Wardroper (née Bisshopp; 12 November 1813 – 14 December 1892) was an English nurse who was matron of St Thomas' Hospital, London, and the first superintendent of the Nightingale School of Nursing at that hospital.

== Biography ==
Wardroper was born at West Burton, West Sussex in 1813. She was married in 1840 to Woodland Wyatt Wardroper a medical doctor in Arundel who died in 1849.

A 42-year-old widow with four children, Wardroper had had no nursing experience apart from looking after her own family, nevertheless her general level of education, good organizational skills and appropriate manner were sufficient for her appointment as matron at St Thomas' Hospital in January 1854. Although nursing was still largely a disreputable occupation she made St Thomas' a model of reformed, professional, nursing and in 1860, with the creation of the training school for nurses by the Nightingale Fund at the same hospital, she was appointed superintendent.

Florence Nightingale selected St Thomas' Hospital as the site for her new nurse training school, largely because of Wardroper's qualities (and those of the enlightened resident medical officer, R.G. Whitfield). Nightingale, Wardroper and Whitfield worked together to establish the new school, the first secular training school for nurses in the world. Wardroper, however, was not so interested in the school. She was and remained, for Nightingale, a "hospital genius", for her ability to deploy nurses efficiently throughout the hospital and advise on the introduction of trained nurses in other institutions.

She and Henry Bonham Carter, as the secretary of the Nightingale Fund Council, worked closely together for decades to send out teams of trained matrons and nurses from St Thomas' to bring in the new high standards to other hospitals. She took visitors to St Thomas' to show how the reformed system operated, and visited hospitals on Nightingale's behalf which were considering the introduction of trained nursing. Her important role can be seen in "S.E. Wardroper, Superintendent 1860-87".

On Wardroper's death in East Grinstead, aged 79, Florence Nightingale wrote, "The Reform of Sick Nursing and the Late Mrs Wardroper".

A memorial to Wardroper in the chapel of St Thomas's Hospital was unveiled in May 1894 by the Archbishop of Canterbury, a marble bas-relief representing the Good Samaritan sculpted by George Tinworth in 1893-94.

== Bibliography ==
- Lynn McDonald (ed.), Florence Nightingale: The Nightingale School (Collected Works of Florence Nightingale, Volume 12), Wilfrid Laurier Univ. Press, 2009, pp. 885–887.
- Pratt, Edwin. "Pioneer Women In Victoria's Reign". Kessinger Publishing, 1 December 2004)
- Wardroper's letters to Nightingale, and a few surviving letters from Nightingale, are preserved at the British Library, Add Mss 47729-33.
