= Angela Bolster =

Irish nun and writer (1925–2005)

- Born: Angela Bolster; 1 April 1925; County Cork
- Died: 2 February 2005 (aged 79); County Cork
- Other names: Mary Angela and Evelyn Bolster
- Education: University College Cork
- Occupations: nun, historian and writer
- Known for: writing

Angela Bolster or Mary Angela RSM (1 April 1925 – 2 February 2005) was an Irish nun who was known for her writing. She was involved in the beatification of Catherine McAuley and revealing the story of the nuns who served as nurses during the Crimean War.

== Life ==
Bolster was born in County Cork in 1925 and she received a religious education. In 1950 she was named "Student of the Year" when she graduated from University College Cork with a double major in history.

In 1965 she published a book based on the research she had done completing her master's degree and doctorate and also on records held by the Sisters of Mercy. Her book told the story of the nuns led by Mary Francis Bridgeman who volunteered to work during the Crimean War. She wrote about the nuns who were nursing Crimea taking on the legacy left by Florence Nightingale.

In 1973 she was involved with the celebration of the bi-centenary of the birth of Catherine McAuley who was a significant figure in their religious order. Two years later she resigned her job as a tutor to work in furthering the cause of McAuley. If she was to be beatified then every piece of her writing needed to be checked and a previous investigation had found no evidence but it had not looked at all her writing. In 1978 she was involved with the celebration of the bi-centenary of the birth of Catherine McAuley who was the founder of their religious order. It was announced at the celebrations that McAuley was to considered as a potential saint. Bolster was appointed in 1979 as one of the first women to be a vice-postulator as vatican rules were relaxed to allow this to happen. Under the guidance of father Peter Gumpel she prepared work that was inspected by historians and theologians. She published considerably on the subject although the work she prepared for the reviews was confidential.

In 1989 she wrote, and her community published, The correspondence of Catherine McAuley 1827-1841''.

Bolster died in County Cork in 2005. Bolster published under the name of M. Angela, Angela Bolster, and Evelyn Bolster.
