= Mary Teresa =

Mary Teresa may refer to:

- Mary Teresa Bojaxhiu (1910–1997), Albanian-Indian Catholic nun
- Mary Teresa Collins (born 1960s), Irish co-founder, abuse survivor, activist, and human rights activist
- Mary Teresa Cullen (nun) (1866–1940), Irish nun
- Mary Teresa Josephine Webber, British palaeographer, medievalist, and academic
- Mary Teresa Norton (1875–1959), American politician
- Teresa Cowley (1852[1] or 1857–1914), Irish Sister of Mercy, Boer war nurse and teacher
