= Aloysius Doyle =

Irish nun and Crimean war nurse

Sister Aloysius Doyle

Personal life
- Born: 1820 Old Kilcullen, County Kildare, Ireland
- Died: 3 October 1908 (aged 87–88)

Religious life
- Religion: Roman Catholic
- Order: Sisters of Mercy

Sister Aloysius Doyle or Catherine Doyle RRC (1820 – 3 October 1908) was an Irish Sisters of Mercy nun and Crimean war nurse.

== Biography ==
Sister Aloysius Doyle was born Catherine Doyle in 1820 near Old Kilcullen, County Kildare. She was one of the seven children of John and Mary Doyle. She had 3 sisters and three brothers. Nothing is known of her education or early life. Doyle entered St Leo's Convent of Mercy, Carlow on 30 April 1849, where she taught at the adjoining school for 5 years. She also attended to the local poor and sick of the town. She professed in December 1851, taking the name Aloysius. Her sister also joined the Sisters of Mercy a decade later, at the Gort convent.

Doyle was one of a number of Sisters of Mercy nuns who volunteered at the outbreak of the Crimean War to serve as nurses at the front. The group arrived in Constantinople on 17 December 1854, with Doyle later being sent to the general hospital at Scutari, working alongside her fellow nuns such as Mary Clare Moore and Mary Francis Bridgeman. In Scutari she treated soldiers suffering from typhus, cholera, dysentery, as well as gangrene and frostbite. She later recalled that "Their moans would pierce the heart." From October 1855 to April 1856 she served at the general hospital in Balaklava. Doyle and her fellow nuns were the subject of intense scrutiny and despite their denials, the war office warned them not to proselytise.

Having returned to Ireland, Doyle was chosen as the superioress of a new foundation in Gort, County Galway in 1857. There she managed a national school, and from 1872, a workhouse hospital. She established an industrial department which taught skills such as dressmaking and weaving. She went on to oversee Mercy foundation in Ennistymon in 1871 and Kinvara in 1878. She retired from her position as superioress at Kinvara in 1885, but continued to live there. During Queen Victoria's diamond jubilee, Doyle was awarded the Royal Red Cross in 1897 as the only surviving Irish war-nurse. She published a memoir of her experiences, Memories of the Crimea. When asked to recall her memories of Florence Nightingale, she said she didn't like her and found her "too bossy" but "that she was a great woman for getting things done". She died 3 October 1908.
