= Mary Clare Moore =

Irish Sisters of Mercy nun, Crimean war nurse and teacher (1814–1874)

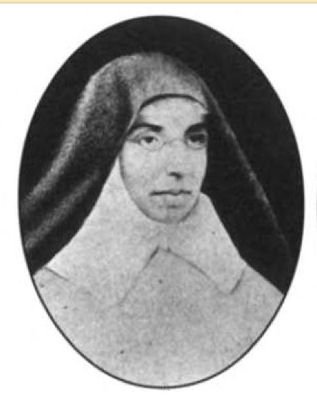
- Mother Mary Clare Moore

Personal life
- Born: Georgina Moore; 20 March 1814 Dublin, Ireland
- Died: 13 December 1874 (aged 60) Bermondsey, London, UK

Religious life
- Religion: Roman Catholic
- Order: Sisters of Mercy

Mother Mary Clare Moore (20 March 1814 – 13 December 1874) was an Irish Sister of Mercy, a Crimean War nurse and a teacher. She was one of the ten original members of the Sisters of Mercy, and was the founding sister superior of the order's first convent in England at Bermondsey.

== Early life ==
Moore was born Georgina Moore in the Church of Ireland parish of St Ann's, Dublin on 20 March 1814. She was the youngest of three children of George and Catherine Moore. The family were Protestant. Her father died in 1817, and in 1823 her mother, Moore and her siblings decided to convert to Catholicism.

Moore received a private education and went on to work as a governess. She took up a position as governess to a niece and a young cousin of Catherine McAuley on 13 October 1828 at the House of Mercy, Baggot Street. While there she started to become involved in the other work of the House of Mercy.

== Career ==
Moore received the habit of the Sisters of Mercy on 23 January 1832 at the recently founded convent in Baggot Street, becoming Sister Mary Clare. She was professed on 24 January 1833. She nursed victims of the 1832 cholera epidemic in Dublin at the Townsend Street Depot Cholera Hospital. Moore was appointed superior of the Cork convent, which was founded on 6 July 1837. In Cork she trained English novices for the first Convent of Mercy in England, at Bermondsey, London.

She became the first superior of the Bermondsey convent at its foundation on 19 November 1839, an appointment she held temporarily until Sister Mary Clare Agnew took up the post. Moore returned to Cork on 26 June 1841, but returned to Bermondsey permanently on 10 December 1841 when Sister Agnew was removed from the post of superior. In London, Moore and the sisters would visit the poor at home and in St Thomas's and Guy's Hospitals. Here they would instruct adult converts and lapsed Catholics. They also were involved in the schooling of poorer communities. The Duchess of Leeds and the Marchioness Wellesley requested that the nuns provide nursing care in their homes.

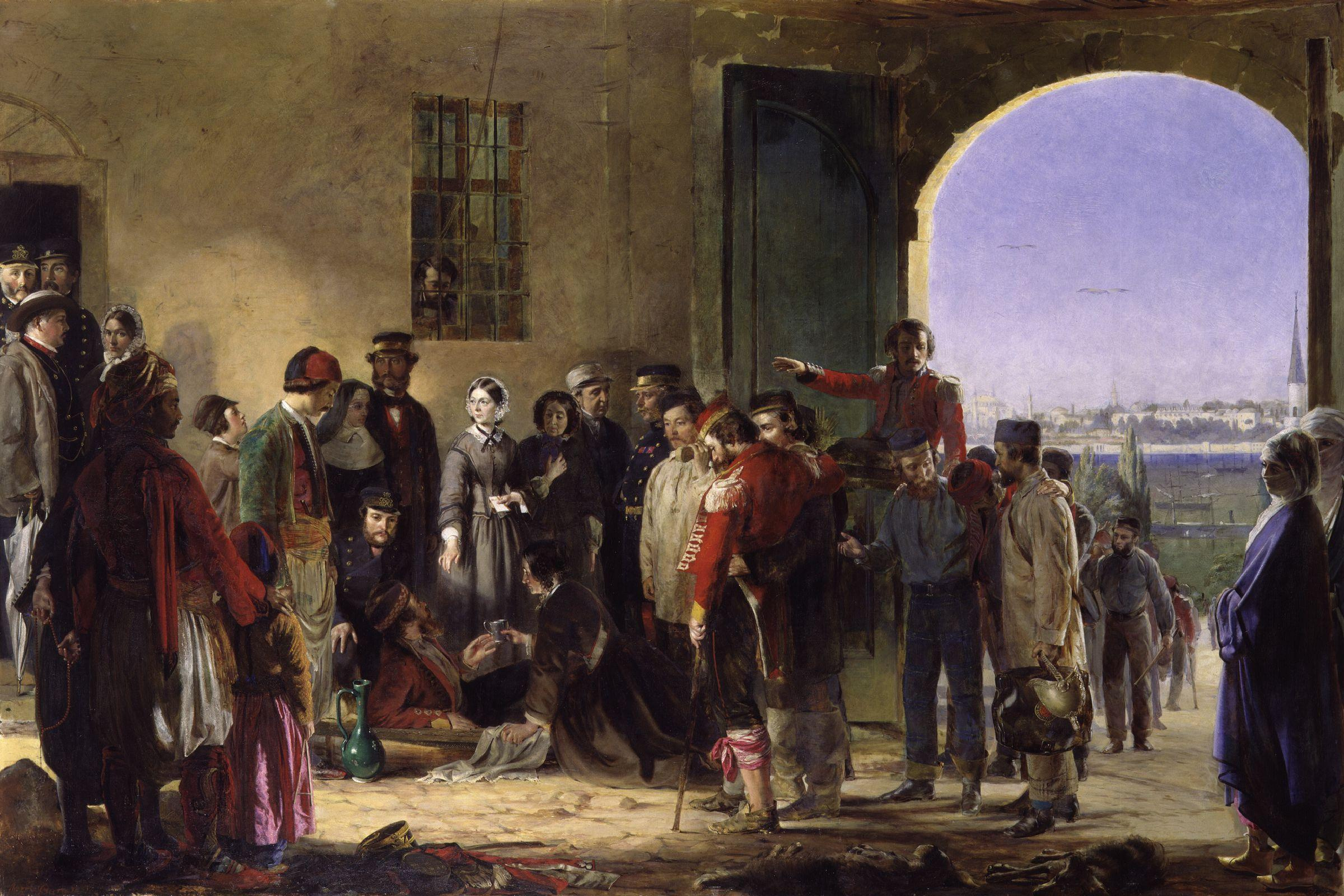
Nightingale receiving the Wounded at Scutari by Jerry Barrett, Moore is depicted to the left of Nightingale

At the request of Bishop Thomas Grant, Moore and four other sisters left London on 17 October 1854 to nurse sick and wounded British Army soldiers in Crimea. Their departure preceded that of Florence Nightingale, but at Grant's request they remained in Paris so that the Nightingale party could join them. While in Paris, Moore visited hospitals there to study nursing practice and gathered surgical supplies and instruments that later proved very useful at the field hospitals in Crimea. On 4 November the groups arrived in Constantinople, and Moore took charge of the stores, kitchens and the orderlies of these departments.

Nightingale's party and the other sisters took charge of the old Turkish barracks converted into a makeshift hospital with 2,500 wounded. Moore was later assigned to the barracks hospital in Scutari, Turkey in 1855, nursing victims of an outbreak of cholera alongside other Sisters of Mercy such as Mother Mary Francis Bridgeman and Sister Aloysius Doyle. On 28 April 1856, she returned to London after a serious illness. Nightingale acknowledged her indebtedness to Moore's nursing duties and paid tribute to her qualities in a letter from Balaclava. Moore and Nightingale would have a lifelong friendship. Moore is included in the painting The Mission of Mercy by Jerry Barrett which depicts Nightingale receiving a wounded soldier at the Barrack Hospital.

In 1868, Moore oversaw the publication of The Practical Sayings of ... Catherine McAuley'. Moore died in the Convent of Mercy, Bermondsey on 13 December 1874, and is buried in the convent cemetery. While Moore was dying, Nightingale wrote that "It is we who are left mother-less when she goes."

== Foundations ==
Moore founded eight convents in England:

- Chelsea (1845)
- Bristol (1846)
- Brighton (1852)
- St John's and Elizabeth's Hospital
- London (1856)
- Wigton (1857)
- Abingdon (1860)
- Gravesend (1860)
- Clifford (1870)
- branch convent and House of Mercy in Eltham (1874)
