= Devotional Revolution =

Transformation of Irish religious practice in the mid-nineteenth century

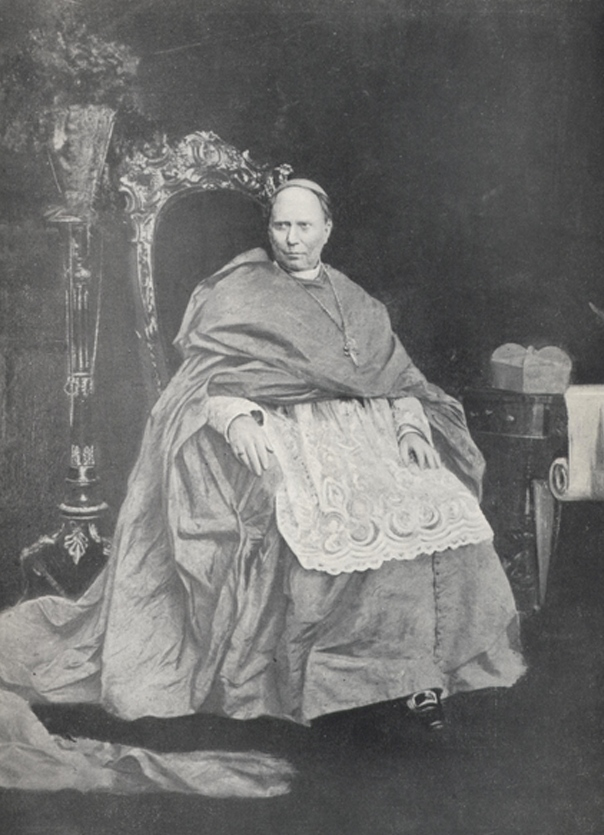
- Paul Cullen, frequently identified by historians as a central figure in the Devotional Revolution
- Date: c. 1850–1875
- Location: Ireland
- Type: Religious transformation
- Cause: Great Famine, Catholic Emancipation, institutional reform
- Outcome: Dramatic increase in Mass attendance and Catholic institutional expansion

The Devotional Revolution refers to the transformation of Irish Catholic religious practice in the mid-nineteenth century, particularly between 1850 and 1875 in the aftermath of the Great Famine and the repeal of Penal Laws in Ireland.

The term was coined by historian Emmet Larkin in an influential 1972 article, which argued that Ireland underwent a fundamental shift from informal "folk Catholicism" to rigorous institutional practice under the leadership of Cardinal Paul Cullen.

== Historical context ==
=== Pre-Famine religious practice ===
Before the Great Famine (1845–1852), Irish Catholic religious practice was characterised by what historians term "folk Catholicism", a syncretic blend of Catholic doctrine with pre-Christian traditions and vernacular practices. The 1834 Commissioners of Public Instruction census revealed that approximately 40–43% of Catholics attended weekly Mass, with dramatic regional variation ranging from 20% in western areas to near-universal attendance in the prosperous southeast and urban centres.

This relatively low Mass attendance reflected multiple factors: severe priest shortages (one priest per 2,750–3,100 Catholics by 1840), inadequate church infrastructure, geographic distances in rural areas, and grinding poverty that left some families without sufficient clothing to attend church. The Vatican classified Ireland as mission territory under the Sacred Congregation for the Propagation of the Faith, reflecting Rome's assessment of the Irish Church's institutional weakness.

However, low Mass attendance did not equate to irreligion. Pre-Famine Ireland featured robust devotional practices including approximately 3,000 holy wells serving as pilgrimage sites, "pattern" days (patron saint festivals) attracting tens of thousands of participants, elaborate wake customs, and emphasis on sacraments at life transitions (baptism, marriage, last rites). While many of these traditions have their roots in Pre-Christian, pagan, and Celtic traditions, some historians such as S.J. Connolly argue that pre-Famine Irish practiced an authentic form of Catholicism that simply differed from highly regulated, standardised form of Catholic practice established after the 16th-century Council of Trent.

=== The Famine's demographic impact ===
The Great Famine killed approximately 1–1.5 million people and caused over a million to emigrate. Critically, Famine mortality and emigration were not evenly distributed across social classes or regions. The catastrophe disproportionately affected landless labourers and cottiers in the Irish-speaking west—precisely the populations least engaged with institutional Catholicism and most invested in folk religious practices.

Sociologist Eugene Hynes argues that "the famine eliminated much of the nonpracticing underclass while leaving largely unscathed an already observant class of better-off farmers." Historian Breandán Mac Suibhne states bluntly that "the Catholic Church was a net winner out of the famine in that the people who died out of the famine were disproportionately people who didn't go to Mass." This demographic selection effect dramatically improved apparent religiosity statistics without requiring mass conversion.

The Famine also created psychological conditions favourable to religious intensification. Protestant proselytising efforts ("souperism") during the crisis, combined with British officials' characterisation of the Famine as divine punishment, strengthened defensive Catholic identity. The traumatised post-Famine population sought meaning and community, creating receptivity to institutional religion's ordering function.

== Mechanisms of transformation ==
=== Cardinal Paul Cullen and institutional reform ===
The transformation's principal architect was Cardinal Paul Cullen (1803–1878), who spent 30 years in Rome before returning to Ireland as Archbishop of Armagh in 1850 and later Archbishop of Dublin (1852–1878), becoming Ireland's first Cardinal in 1866. Cullen was an arch-Ultramontanist who used his Vatican connections to control episcopal appointments and reshape Irish Catholicism according to Roman standards.

The Synod of Thurles (1850) was the first national synod in Ireland since 1642 and marked the institutional revolution's formal beginning. Its 187 decrees fundamentally restructured Irish religious practice: sacraments were banned from private houses and relocated to churches; priests were forbidden from participating in secular festivities like dances and horse races; Roman devotional forms were mandated; and clerical discipline was tightened. The synod physically relocated Irish religious life from homes and holy wells to church buildings under direct clerical control.

=== Institutional expansion ===
The post-Famine period witnessed extraordinary institutional growth. The number of women religious exploded from approximately 120 nuns in 1800 to 8,031 by 1901 (one per 400 population). The Sisters of Mercy alone grew from roughly 100 members in 1841 to approximately 15,000 worldwide by 1900. Nearly 20 new churches were built in Dublin archdiocese under Cullen, along with nearly 40 religious foundations. Nationwide, 277 additional convents were constructed in the second half of the nineteenth century.

More than 2,000 Catholic churches had been built between 1790 and 1847, but the post-Famine period saw continued construction and renovation. Improved priest-to-population ratios (reaching 1:1,560 by 1871) resulted from both population decline and increased ordinations. These institutions embedded the Church into every aspect of Irish life through control of education, healthcare, social welfare, orphanages, and reformatories.

=== Devotional transformation ===
Cullen systematically introduced continental devotional practices that transformed Irish religious culture. The Rosary became the foundation of family devotion, with evening recitation becoming nearly universal. Forty Hours' Devotion, Benediction of the Blessed Sacrament, perpetual adoration, Stations of the Cross, novenas, and devotions to the Sacred Heart and Immaculate Conception became standard practice. Lay confraternities and sodalities organised Catholics under clerical direction.

Traditional "patterns" at holy wells, which often included a mixture of piety, drinking, dancing, and celebration, were actively discouraged or suppressed in favour of more controlled pilgrimages to sites like Knock and Lough Derg. While Michael Carroll argues that even pre-Famine holy well devotions represented Counter-Reformation synthesis rather than pagan survivals, the post-Famine Church clearly sought to channel popular religiosity into institutional forms.

Mass attendance statistics capture the transformation's scale: from approximately 33–43% before the Famine to over 90% by the 1870s—a figure maintained until the 1970s. Mass attendance did not begin to rapidly drop in Ireland until the 1990s, with Ireland becoming internationally distinctive for its level of religious practice.

== Connection with Irish nationalism ==
The Devotional Revolution coincided with the rise of Irish nationalism and the two became deeply intertwined. As historian Emmet Larkin argued, Catholicism provided "a substitute symbolic language" and "new cultural heritage" as Anglicisation eroded the Irish language as an identity marker. Daniel O'Connell's Catholic Association (founded 1823) had already demonstrated Catholicism's effectiveness as a basis for political mobilisation.

British colonial policy inadvertently strengthened this fusion by historically persecuting Catholicism, making religious identity a badge of resistance to British rule. The 1937 Constitution codified this relationship, recognising "the special position of the Holy Catholic Apostolic and Roman Church," prohibiting divorce, and invoking the Trinity in its preamble. Characteristics used to justify British rule were elevated as markers of independent Irish identity.

The identification of Irish identity with Catholicism became so complete that mid-twentieth-century Ireland was internationally recognised as one of the most religiously observant societies in the Catholic world, with the Church exercising extraordinary influence over social policy, education, and moral regulation.

== Historiographical debates ==
=== Larkin's original thesis and immediate critiques ===
While the basic thesis of Devotional Revolution and significant post-Great Famine religious change is widely accepted by historians, many elements have been subject to scholarly revision and debate.

Emmet Larkin's 1972 article in the American Historical Review, titled "The Devotional Revolution in Ireland, 1850-75," has been called "probably the most famous article ever published by an Irish historian." Larkin argued that pre-Famine Irish "were not practicing Catholics, if indeed they were Catholics at all" and underwent "sudden and dramatic transformation" into observant believers under Cullen's leadership.

Immediate criticism focused on Larkin's characterisation of pre-Famine religiosity. David W. Miller, Larkin's own doctoral student, conducted the most rigorous analysis of the 1834 census data and found 43% national attendance rather than Larkin's 33%, with massive regional variation. Miller later described Larkin's suggestion that pre-Famine Irish were barely Catholic as "ahistorical," noting three legitimate modes of Catholic practice existed: chapel-based, household-based stations, and natural-landscape-based (holy wells).

S.J. Connolly's study Priests and People in Pre-Famine Ireland (1982) documented robust religious practice existing outside formal Mass attendance and found evidence that devotional changes began earlier than 1850. Larkin himself later moderated his claims, acknowledging his thesis might better be described as "a revolution with a small 'r'."

=== The "Tridentine evolution" counter-thesis ===
Thomas McGrath's 1990 article proposed an alternative "Tridentine Evolution" thesis, arguing that what Larkin identified as revolution was actually the final stage of a 300-year process dating to the Council of Trent (1563). McGrath contended the Church had continuously sought Tridentine compliance but was prevented by Penal Laws and resource constraints until the nineteenth century.

While McGrath's emphasis on longer temporal perspectives has influenced subsequent scholarship, his placement of primary causation three centuries before the effect "has found little support" among historians. Most scholars accept that Tridentine reform efforts existed throughout the period but argue the post-Famine decades represented a qualitatively different moment of rapid transformation.

=== Class-based and demographic explanations ===
Eugene Hynes's 1978 sociological analysis reframed the Devotional Revolution as primarily a class phenomenon rather than religious conversion. Hynes argued that canonical religious practice was always class-specific behavior among better-off farmers, and the Famine's demographic selection effect, in eliminating non-practicing poor while preserving observant farmers, mechanically improved religiosity statistics.

This interpretation has gained substantial support. Historians note that the ten counties with highest Famine mortality were primarily western rural counties with lowest pre-Famine Mass attendance. Improved priest-to-population ratios resulted from population collapse, not suddenly converted believers. Kevin Whelan characterises the change as "dependent on the cultural carnage of the Famine,".

=== Regional variation and continuity arguments ===
Some regional studies have complicated narratives of uniform transformation. David Miller's analysis revealed that southeastern Ireland and urban areas already showed strong institutional observance before the Famine. More than 2,000 Catholic churches were built between 1790 and 1847, demonstrating substantial pre-Famine institutional development.

Kevin Whelan notes "the nucleus of church and school was often in place in the pre-Famine period," suggesting evolutionary rather than revolutionary change. Catholic Emancipation (1829) had already accelerated church-building programmes, the National School System was established in 1831, and Maynooth College received increased state funding in 1845 - all before the Famine.

=== Current scholarly consensus ===
The historiographical consensus involves modified acceptance of Larkin's core insight with significant qualifications. Scholars accept that Irish Catholic practice changed substantially in the post-Famine period, but characterise the change as evolutionary rather than revolutionary, driven by demographic selection, infrastructure improvements, and longer-term processes dating to at least the 1790s.

Pre-Famine Irish people are now understood to have practiced a form of Catholicism that differed from Vatican-sanctioned institutional forms. The Encyclopedia of Irish History and Culture states that historians have "demonstrated the contingent relationship between religion and identity over the past two thousand years," showing "how religion has repeatedly reconfigured itself in response to social and political developments."

Larkin's thesis remains productive framework for understanding nineteenth-century Irish religious history, but with recognition that the transformation was less dramatic, less sudden, and more dependent on social and demographic factors than originally argued. Larkin none-the-less remains a prominent historian with a 2000 Festschrift Piety and Power in Ireland, 1760-1960: Essays in Honour of Emmet Larkin published to mark the enduring influence of his original article.

== Modern decline and interpretation ==
=== Secularisation from the 1990s ===
From the 1990s onward, Ireland experienced rapid secularisation. Weekly Mass attendance fell from 91% in 1975 to approximately 30-35% by the 2020s, remarkably similar to pre-Famine figures. The Irish Census recorded that Catholic identification dropped from 91.6% in 1991 to 69.1% in 2022, with "no religion" reaching 14% overall and approaching 20% among those under 35.

Landmark referendums demonstrated transformed social attitudes: divorce passed narrowly in 1995 (50.3%), same-sex marriage won decisively in 2015 (62%), and abortion rights prevailed in 2018 (66.4%). Ireland became the first country worldwide to legalise same-sex marriage by popular vote.

Clerical abuse scandals and their institutional cover-up profoundly damaged Church authority in Ireland. Religious vocations collapsed with Maynooth seminary enrollment falling to approximately 20 seminarians. By the 2010s almost half of Irish priests were over 60, and the average age of Irish nuns exceeds 80..

=== The "anomaly" hypothesis ===
Some scholars have suggested that the period of intense devotion (1850-1990) may have been a historical anomaly rather than the culmination of centuries-old tradition. The Encyclopedia of Irish History and Culture notes: "It is historically accurate to say that the nearly universal religious observance whose erosion prompts the [claim of a 'post-Catholic society'] is no older than a century and a half."

One analysis suggests the collapse of Devotional Revolution Catholicism might mean "Irish conditions [are] coming into closer line with those of Catholicism globally," implying "Ireland in the century between the Famine and the 1950s was more of an aberration in Catholic terms transnationally."

However, this interpretation remains contested. The Oxford Handbook of Religion in Modern Ireland explicitly warns that "it is probably too early to write obituaries of Christian Ireland" and cautions that "a focus on 'the death of Irish Catholicism' may obscure more than it reveals." Crawford Gribben characterises Ireland's experience as "sudden-onset secularisation" distinct from earlier patterns rather than a return to any previous state.

Historians generally reject presentist readings in both directions. Neither the view that pre-Famine Ireland was barely Catholic nor the view that modern Ireland has simply returned to a secular norm. The scholarly consensus treats different eras as having different forms of religion, each authentic to its context, rather than measuring all periods against a single standard.

== Legacy and significance ==
The Devotional Revolution, whether conceived as dramatic transformation or evolutionary intensification, fundamentally shaped modern Irish society. The period established patterns of religious practice, institutional control over Irish life, and fusion of Catholic and national identity that defined Ireland through the mid-twentieth century. The Church's institutional expansion created structures (schools, hospitals, social services) that remain embedded in Irish society even as religious observance declines.

The historiographical debate surrounding the Devotional Revolution has broader implications for understanding relationships between religion, modernisation, and national identity. It demonstrates how religious practice responds to demographic catastrophe, political change, and institutional initiative. The Irish case has influenced scholarly understanding of religious transformation globally, particularly in post-colonial contexts where religious identity becomes fused with national identity.

== See also ==
- Catholic Church in Ireland
- Great Famine (Ireland)
- Paul Cullen (cardinal)
- History of Ireland (1801–1923)
- Religion in the Republic of Ireland
- Secularism in the Republic of Ireland

== Bibliography ==
=== Primary sources ===
- Larkin, Emmet (1972). "The Devotional Revolution in Ireland, 1850-75". American Historical Review. 77 (3): 625–652. doi:10.2307/1861917.

=== Secondary sources ===
- Bowen, Desmond (1970). Souperism: Myth or Reality? A Study of Catholics and Protestants During the Great Famine. Cork: Mercier Press.
- Bradshaw, Brendan (2000). Bradshaw, Brendan; Keogh, Daire (eds.). Piety and Power in Ireland, 1760-1960: Essays in Honour of Emmet Larkin. Notre Dame: University of Notre Dame Press.
- Carroll, Michael P. (1999). Irish Pilgrimage: Holy Wells and Popular Catholic Devotion. Baltimore: Johns Hopkins University Press.
- Clear, Caitriona (1987). Nuns in Nineteenth-Century Ireland. Dublin: Gill and Macmillan.
- Connolly, S.J. (1982). Priests and People in Pre-Famine Ireland, 1780-1845. Dublin: Gill and Macmillan.
- Central Statistics Office (2023). Census of Population 2022 - Religion (Report). Dublin: Stationery Office.
- Ganiel, Gladys (2016). "Declining Church Attendance in Ireland". The Furrow. 67 (6): 325–338.
- Ganiel, Gladys (2022). "Introduction: Religion in Modern Ireland". In Ganiel, Gladys; Keenan, Marie; Casanova, José (eds.). The Oxford Handbook of Religion in Modern Ireland. Oxford: Oxford University Press.
- Girvin, Brian (2008). The Emergency: Neutral Ireland 1939-45. London: Pan Macmillan.
- Gribben, Crawford (2021). The Rise and Fall of Christian Ireland. Oxford: Oxford University Press.
- Healy, Gráinne; Sheehan, Brian; Whelan, Noel (2015). Ireland Says Yes: The Inside Story of How the Vote for Marriage Equality Was Won. Sallins: Merrion Press.
- Hynes, Eugene (1978). "The Great Hunger and Irish Catholicism". Societas. 8: 137–156.
- Inglis, Tom (1998). Moral Monopoly: The Rise and Fall of the Catholic Church in Modern Ireland (2nd ed.). Dublin: University College Dublin Press.
- Keenan, Desmond J. (2008). The Catholic Church in Nineteenth-Century Ireland: A Sociological Study. Dublin: Gill and Macmillan.
- Keenan, Marie (2012). Child Sexual Abuse and the Catholic Church: Gender, Power, and Organizational Culture. Oxford: Oxford University Press.
- Keogh, Dermot (1995). Ireland and the Vatican: The Politics and Diplomacy of Church-State Relations, 1922-1960. Cork: Cork University Press.
- Mac Suibhne, Breandán (7 August 2022). "Catholic Church was a 'net winner' from Ireland's Great Famine, historian says". The Irish Times.
- McGrath, Thomas (1991). "The Tridentine Evolution of Modern Irish Catholicism, 1563-1962: A Re-examination of the 'Devotional Revolution' Thesis". Recusant History. 20 (4): 512–523.
- Miller, David W. (1975). "Irish Catholicism and the Great Famine". Journal of Social History. 9 (1): 81–98.
- Miller, David W. (2005). "Devotional Revolution". In Donnelly, James S. (ed.). Encyclopedia of Irish History and Culture. Detroit: Macmillan Reference.
- O'Dwyer, Frederick (1994). The Architecture of Deane and Woodward. Cork: Cork University Press.
- Raftery, Mary; O'Sullivan, Eoin (1999). Suffer the Little Children: The Inside Story of Ireland's Industrial Schools. Dublin: New Island Books.
- Whelan, Kevin (1996). The Tree of Liberty: Radicalism, Catholicism and the Construction of Irish Identity 1760-1830. Cork: Cork University Press.
- Whelan, Kevin (2005). "The Cultural Effects of the Famine". In Póirtéir, Cathal (ed.). The Great Irish Famine. Cork: Mercier Press. pp. 137–154.
- Ray, Celeste (2011). "The Sacred and the Body Politic at Ireland's Holy Wells". International Social Science Journal. UNESCO. doi:10.1111/ISSJ.12000.
- "Everything you need to know about Ireland's disaffected Catholics". The Week. The Week Staff. 8 January 2015.
