= Gumpel =

Gumpel or Gumbel is a Germanic surname that may refer to

- Emil Julius Gumbel (1891–1966), German mathematician and political writer
- Peter Gumpel (1923–2022), German Roman Catholic Jesuit priest and Church historian
- Max Gumpel (1890–1965), Swedish building contractor and Olympic water polo player
