= Emmet Larkin =

American historian of Ireland (1927–2012)

- Born: 19 May 1927; New York City, U.S.
- Died: 19 March 2012 (aged 84); Chicago, U.S.

Academic background
- Education: Columbia University
- Thesis: James Larkin and the Irish labour movement, 1876-1914 (1957)

Academic work
- Institutions: MIT; University of Chicago
- Main interests: Catholicism in 19th-century Ireland

Emmet Joseph Larkin (19 May 1927 – 19 March 2012) was an American historian. He was born on 19 May 1927 in New York City to Irish parents from Galway. From 1944 to 1946, he served as a corporal in the United States Army, and using the G.I. Bill attended university. He earned his B.A. in 1950 at New York University, and his M.A. and Ph.D. at Columbia University in 1951 and 1957 respectively.

Larkin became an instructor at Brooklyn College in 1954, a Fulbright scholar at the London School of Economics in 1956–1957, and an assistant professor at Massachusetts Institute of Technology starting in 1960. In 1966 he became an associate professor at the University of Chicago, and was promoted to a full professor in 1971. He remained at the University of Chicago until his retirement in 2006. He received an honorary doctorate from the National University of Ireland in 1987. He died on 19 March 2012 in Chicago.

Larkin's primary area of study was the Catholic Church in 19th-century Ireland. He was especially influenced by the historiographical approaches of Lewis Namier and Élie Halévy. Larkin's most prominent contribution to Irish historiography was his 1972 article The Devotional Revolution in Ireland, 1850-1875 which described the changes in Irish Catholic devotion after the Great Famine under Cardinal Paul Cullen.

== Works ==
- James Larkin: Irish Labour Leader, 1876-1947 (1965). Cambridge: MIT Press. ISBN 9780745303048.
- 'The Devotional Revolution in Ireland, 1850-1875' (1972) The American Historical Review, 77(3), pp. 625–652. doi:10.2307/1870344.
- The Roman Catholic Church and the Creation of the Modern Irish State, 1878-1886 (1975). Philadelphia: American Philosophical Society. ISBN 9780871691088.
- The Historical Dimensions of Irish Catholicism (1976). New York: Arno Press. ISBN 9780405093449.
- The Roman Catholic Church and the Plan of Campaign in Ireland, 1886-1888 (1978). Cork: Cork University Press. ISBN 9780902561120.
- The Roman Catholic Church and the Fall of Parnell, 1888-1891 (1979). Chapel Hill: University of North Carolina Press. ISBN 9780807813522.
- The Making of the Roman Catholic Church in Ireland, 1850-1860 (1980). Chapel Hill: University of North Carolina Press. ISBN 9780807814192.
- The Consolidation of the Roman Catholic Church in Ireland, 1860-1870 (1987). Chapel Hill: University of North Carolina Press. ISBN 9780807817254.
- (ed.) Alexis de Tocqueville’s Journey in Ireland, July–August 1835 (1990). Washington, D.C.: Catholic University of America Press. ISBN 9780813207186.
- The Roman Catholic Church and the Home Rule Movement in Ireland, 1870-1874 (1990). New York: Gill & Macmillan. ISBN 9780807818862.
- The Roman Catholic Church and the Emergence of the Modern Irish Political System, 1874-1878 (1996). Dublin: Four Courts Press. ISBN 9780813208732.
- The Pastoral Role of the Roman Catholic Church in Pre-Famine Ireland, 1750-1850 (2006). Washington, D.C.: Catholic University of America Press. ISBN 9780813214573.
- 'The Beginnings of the Devotional Revolution in Ireland: The Parish Mission Movement, 1825-1846' (2014) New Hibernia Review, 18(1), pp. 74–92. doi:10.1353/nhr.2014.0019. (published posthumously)
