= Mary Frances Xavier Warde =

One of the original Sisters of Mercy

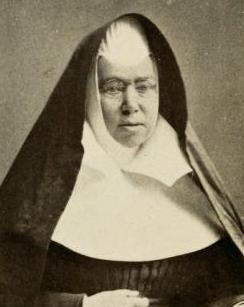
Mother Mary Frances Xavier Warde

Mary Frances Xavier Warde, R.S.M., (1810-1884) was one of the original Sisters of Mercy, a Roman Catholic religious congregation of women founded in Ireland by Catherine McAuley, and the foundress of the congregation in the United States.

== Life ==
She was born Frances Teresa Warde in Mountrath, Queen's County, Ireland, to an upper class couple, John Warde and his wife Jane Maher. Despite her privileged upbringing, she was drawn to share in the charitable work of Catherine McAuley, who had opened a house in Dublin to educate the poor and serve the homeless. At that time, McAuley and her coworkers were a group of lay volunteers, who combined a routine of prayer and service.

When the group's lifestyle caused gossip to arise about their situation, the Archbishop of Dublin stepped in to force the group to choose between being either a religious congregation or a secular charity, they chose to take religious vows. In 1831, after McAuley and two companions had completed a year of novitiate and taken their vows, they formally founded the congregation of the Religious Sisters of Mercy. During that time of seclusion for the founders of the new congregation, Warde supervised the operation of the House of Mercy. She then became the first postulant, taking the religious name by which she is known upon her own admission into the novitiate and her taking of the habit.

After her own profession of vows, Warde was appointed superior of the convent at Carlow in Ireland, and helped establish convents at Naas and Wexford in that country.

== Sisters of Mercy in America ==
In 1843, at the request of Bishop Michael O'Connor of the Diocese of Pittsburgh, Mother Warde and six other sisters left Carlow for America, where they took charge of the cathedral Sunday school at Saint Paul's Cathedral. At the request of Bishop William Quarter, she established a convent in Chicago in 1846. Two years later, she established another at Father Gallitzin's settlement at Loretto, Pennsylvania. She went on to help form schools or houses in Boston, Hartford, Buffalo, New York and elsewhere throughout New England. A woman of strong presence, in 1850 she reportedly faced down a group of "Know-Nothing rioters" at a newly established convent in Providence, Rhode Island.

By the time of her death in 1884, Warde had established over 82 Mercy convents, schools, hospitals, orphanages and other works of mercy in some 20 cities across nine states. She died at Manchester, New Hampshire, where she had earlier set up night schools for factory children.

Mother Mary Frances Xavier Warde was inducted into the Rhode Island Heritage Hall of Fame in 2002. The Frances Xavier Warde School, an elementary school in the Roman Catholic Archdiocese of Chicago, is named after her.

== Biography ==
=== Ireland ===
Frances Warde was born in 1810 at Belbrook House, in Abbeyleix, County Laois, Ireland, the youngest of six children of William and Mary (Maher) Warde. After the deaths of her parents, she was entrusted to the care of a maternal grand-aunt who undertook the formation of her religious character according to the method of Fénelon. Naturally of a lively disposition, she was carried away by the frivolities of fashionable life until her scruples led her to confide in her director. She followed his advice in offering her services to the foundress of the Congregation of the Sisters of Mercy, whom she assisted in instructing the little inmates of the recently erected House for Homeless Children. Assuming the plain black habit of the institution in 1828, she conducted the affairs of the home while Mother McAuley and two foundress companions were making their novitiate in the Presentation Convent of George's Hill preparatory to the founding of the new congregation. After their return as professed Sisters of Mercy, she and six companions assumed the garb of the congregation.

In 1837 she was appointed superior of the convent at Carlow, which had been built under her supervision and was the first house of the congregation outside of Dublin. In 1839 she founded the convent of Naas and in 1840 that of Wexford, to which soon after its establishment the public orphan asylum was affiliated. From Wexford, foundations have been sent out as far as Australia. The convent of Sligo was perhaps the most noteworthy of her Irish foundations on account of its flourishing training-school for teachers. In 1839 her niece Joanna Bridgeman joined the order as a postulant, later serving as a nursing pioneer in the Crimean War as Mother Mary Francis Bridgeman.

=== America ===
In 1843 Bishop O'Connor of Pittsburgh applied to Carlow for a foundation for his diocese, and Mother Warde with a band of six left for America. When they disembarked at New York in December, the sisters were met by William Quarter, pastor of St. Mary's Church on Grand Street on the Lower East Side. An Irishman from County Offaly, Quarter had just been appointed first bishop of the newly erected Diocese of Chicago. He wasted no time in requesting Warde consider sending some sisters to his diocese as soon as possible.

At Pittsburgh, the sisters took charge of the cathedral Sunday school and the instruction of adults. Mother Warde's power of language and sympathy allied to ardent zeal won many to the Church. Parochial schools and academies, visitation of the sick poor in their houses and in the poor house, visitation of the penitentiary, and the opening of the first hospital in Pittsburgh followed each other in rapid succession. In 1846 a foundation was made in Chicago in keeping with Mother Warde's promise to Bishop Quarter. The Chicago Mercys became the first religious community of women in that city. When Mother McAuley founded the Sisters of Mercy, she believed that when a new convent was established it should become an independent foundation. Warde and five sisters, only one of whom was as yet professed) established Saint Francis Xavier Female Academy, which later became Saint Xavier University. In 1852 Mercy Hospital was established at Rush Street and the Chicago River.

In 1848 she opened a branch house in the Alleghenies on land given by the Reverend Demetrius Gallitzen within the limits of his Catholic settlement of Loretto. Her educational work in Pittsburgh came to the attention of Bishop Bernard O'Reilly of Hartford. Although in 1850, the "Know nothings" had burned the Ursuline convent near Boston, in 1851 Mother Warde accepted Bishop O'Reilly's invitation of to open a house in Providence, Rhode Island. In 1851, she founded St. Xavier's Academy, the first Catholic secondary school in Rhode Island. A boarding school with day students as well, it served both as a finishing school for girls and a novitiate for the congregation.

Under Warde's supervision, the congregation undertook the education of most young women in parish elementary schools throughout southeastern New England. O’Reilly purchased the Stead estate at the corner of Providence's Broad and Claverick Streets for them, and the sisters assumed the care of nineteen orphaned girls. In March 1855, a mob surrounded the convent, threatening to burn it down if they did not immediately vacate the premises. Bishop O'Reilly and a group of Irish Catholic defenders confronted the mob. Mother Warde exacted a promise from each of their Catholic defenders that no shot would be fired except in self-defence, and the sisters held possession of the convent. One of the rioters had remarked to his companions: "We made our plans without reckoning the odds we shall have to contend with in the strong controlling force the presence of that nun commands. The only honourable course for us is to retreat from this ill-conceived fray. I, for one, shall not lift a hand to harm these ladies."

In 1852 Mother Warde opened houses in Hartford and New Haven to which free schools were attached; later on academies were opened and the works of mercy inaugurated. In 1854 Mrs. Goodloe Harper, daughter of Charles Carroll of Carrollton, donated to the congregation a house and some ground at Newport, R.I., for a convent and schools. Her daughter, Miss Emily Harper, was also a generous benefactor. In 1857 free and select schools were opened at Rochester, and later at Buffalo, by desire of Bishop Timon. On 16 July 1858, Mother Warde and a band of missionaries left Providence for Manchester, by invitation of Bishop Bacon of Portland, and there established night schools for factory children. St. Mary's Academy was opened the same year. In 1861, at the request of Bishop Wood, Mother Warde opened a convent at Philadelphia, where free schools and the works of mercy were instituted. In 1864 a foundation was sent to Omaha; in 1865 a branch house and schools were opened at Bangor, Maine; in 1871 a colony of sisters was sent to Yreka, California, and North Whitefield Mission, Maine, was undertaken by Mother Warde, who likewise sent foundations to Jersey City, Bordentown, and Princeton, N.J. In 1857 Bishop Bacon requested her to open an orphanage in Portland, but a disastrous fire delayed the work until 1872, when the Burlington foundation had been begun. The Kavanagh School was given to the sisters by Miss Winifred Kavanagh; an academy was also opened at Portland. On the feast of the Exaltation of the Holy Cross, 1878, Mother Warde sent the sisters to labour among the Indians of Maine at Old Town, Pleasant Point, and Dana's Point. The Government built the schoolhouses and paid the sisters salaries for teaching the Indian children. Mother Warde's last works were the opening of an Old Ladies' Home and a Young Ladies' Academy at Deering, Maine.

Warde served as superior general of the Mercy Sisters in America until 1858. At the time of her golden jubilee in 1883, Mother Warde was the oldest Sister of Mercy alive. Endowed with rare common-sense, she was an optimist in all things. In appearance she was of medium height, erect, and of commanding presence; her forehead was high, and her blue eyes deeply set. She died at Manchester, N.H., 17 September 1884.
