= Peter Gumpel =

German Jesuit priest and historian (1923–2022)

Kurt Peter Gumpel (15 November 1923 – 12 October 2022) was a German Jesuit priest and Church historian. A professor emeritus of the Gregorian University in Rome, he was the relator in Pope Pius XII's cause for beatification.

== Biography ==
Gumpel was born in Hannover, Germany, as a member of the House of Hohenzollern, although he later changed his last name.

Under the National-Socialist regime, he and several members of his family were threatened by Nazis because of their anti-Nazi views, and he had to flee from Germany twice, first to France and then to the Netherlands, where during the war he went underground and helped Jews to flee.

Gumpel was involved in the beatification of Catherine McAuley. Angela Bolster, an Irish nun and McAuley expert, was appointed in 1979 as one of the first women to be a vice-postulator as Vatican rules were relaxed to allow this to happen. It was under the guidance of Father Gumpel, that she prepared work that was inspected by historians and theologians.

In later times, Gumpel expressed regret that well known Catholic personalities and groups questioned the wisdom of promoting the cause of Pope Pius XII's beatification. For different reasons, Jewish groups too were opposed to the pope's beatification.

Gumpel died in Rome on 12 October 2022, at the age of 98.
