= Paul Cullen (cardinal) =

Irish Catholic cardinal (1803–1878)

His Eminence Paul Cardinal Cullen
- Archbishop of Dublin; Primate of Ireland
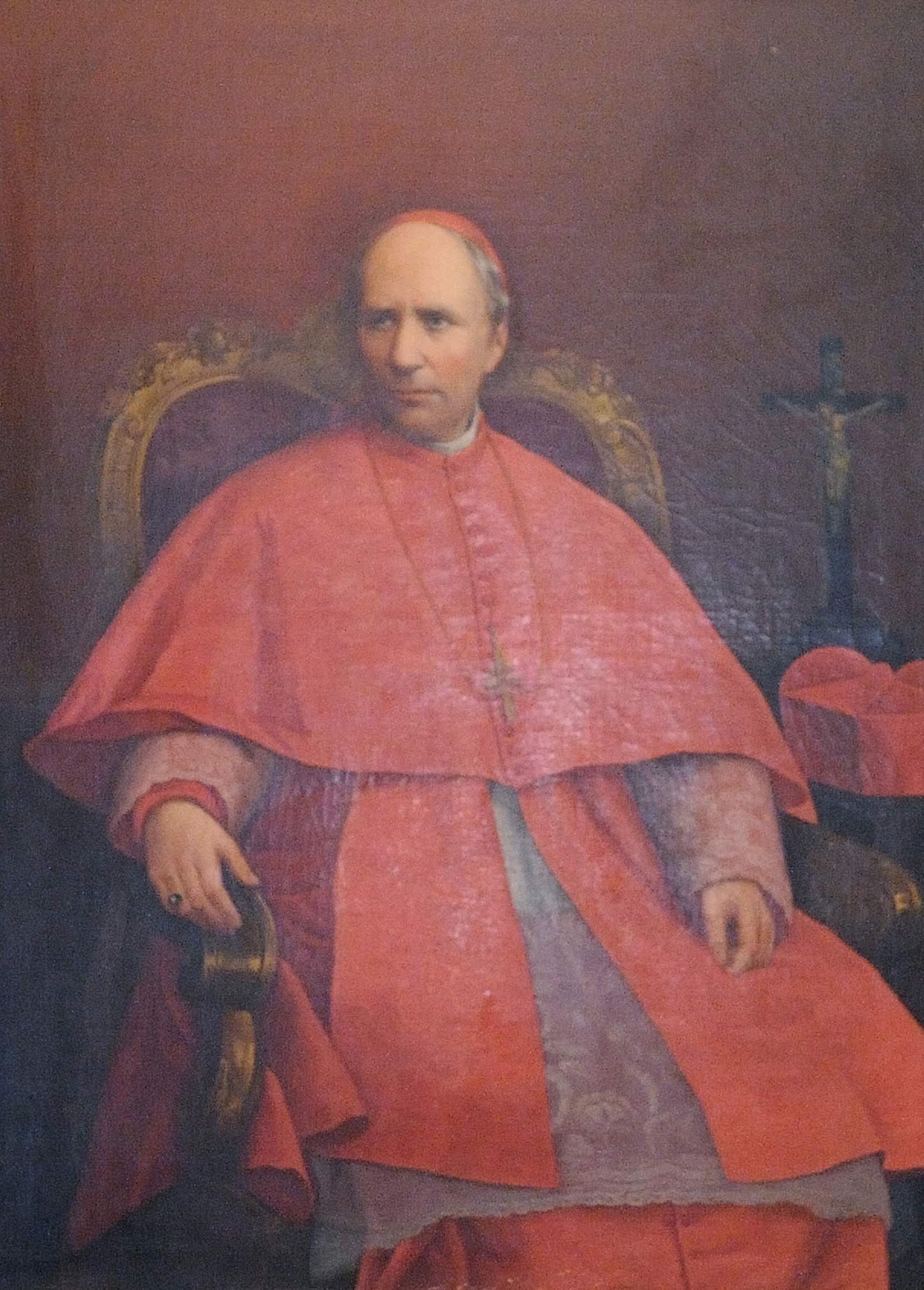
- Archdiocese: Dublin
- Province: Dublin
- Installed: 1 May 1852
- Term ended: 24 October 1878
- Predecessor: Daniel Murray
- Successor: Edward MacCabe
- Other posts: Archbishop of Armagh (1850–1852); Cardinal Priest of San Pietro in Montorio (1866-1878)

Orders
- Ordination: 19 April 1829 by Pietro Caprano
- Consecration: 24 February 1850 by Castruccio Castracane degli Antelminelli
- Created cardinal: 22 June 1866 by Pius IX
- Rank: Cardinal-Priest

Personal details
- Born: 29 April 1803 Narraghmore, County Kildare, Ireland
- Died: 24 October 1878 (aged 75) Dublin, Ireland
- Buried: St Mary's Cathedral, Dublin, Ireland
- Denomination: Catholic
- Education: St. Patrick's College, Pontifical Urban College
- Motto: Ponit animam pro amicis

Paul Cardinal Cullen (29 April 1803 – 24 October 1878) was Roman Catholic Archbishop of Dublin and previously of Armagh, and the first Irish cardinal. His Ultramontanism spearheaded the Romanisation of the Catholic Church in Ireland and ushered in the Devotional Revolution experienced in Ireland through the second half of the 19th century and much of the 20th century. A trained biblical theologian and scholar of ancient languages, Cullen crafted the formula for papal infallibility at the First Vatican Council.

== Early life ==
Cullen was born at Prospect, Narraghmore, Athy, County Kildare, one of 16 children of Hugh and Judith (Maher) Cullen, six of whom were from Hugh's first marriage. His first school was the Quaker Shackleton School in nearby Ballitore.

Following the relaxation of some of the Penal Laws, his father purchased some 700 acres (2.8 km^{2}), giving him the status of a Catholic "strong farmer", a class that greatly influenced 19th-century Irish society. They were fervent in their Catholicism and fearful of the sort of social unrest that had led to the failed 1798 Rising. His great-nieces, Mary and Elizabeth Cullen became nuns, and two great-nephews entered the priesthood.

Cullen entered St Patrick's College, Carlow, in 1816, and, in 1820, he proceeded to the Pontifical Urban College in Rome, where his name is registered on the roll of students of 29 November 1820. At the close of a distinguished course of studies, he was selected to hold a public disputation in the halls of the Propaganda on 11 September 1828, in 224 theses from all theology and ecclesiastical history. The theological tournament was privileged in many ways, for Pope Leo XII, attended by his court, presided on the occasion, while no fewer than ten cardinals assisted at it, together with all the élite of ecclesiastical Rome. Vincenzo Pecci, the future Pope Leo XIII, was present at the disputation. Cullen graduated a doctor of divinity.

He was ordained in 1829. During his studies, Cullen acquired knowledge of classical and Oriental languages. He was later appointed to the chairs of Hebrew and Sacred Scripture in the schools of the Propaganda, and receiving at the same time the charge of the famed printing establishment of the Congregation of Propaganda Fidei. This later charge he resigned in 1832, after being appointed Rector of the Pontifical Irish College in Rome, but during the short term of his administration, he published a standard edition of the Greek and Latin Lexicon of Benjamin Hedericus, which still holds its place in the Italian colleges; he also edited the Acts of the congregation in seven quarto volumes, as well as other important works.

== Rector of Pontifical Irish College ==
In late 1831, Cullen was appointed rector of a fledgling and struggling Irish College. He successfully secured the future of the college by increasing the student population and thereby strengthening the finances of the college. He astutely fostered relationships with the Irish hierarchy, on whom he relied for students, often becoming their official Roman agent. This role yielded income and influence and was to remain a key function of future rectors. He endeavoured to chart a middle ground between conflicting parties of Irish bishops. He was active in his opposition to the establishment of the secular Queen's Colleges.

During the revolution that saw the authority of the Papal States violently displaced for the short lived Roman Republic, he accepted the position of rector of the College of Propaganda while retaining charge of the Irish College. As all the rectors of Colleges in Rome, who were not foreigners, had to leave the city, Cullen was left in charge, temporally, of their interests. Soon after his appointment the Revolutionary Trimuvirate issued orders that the College of Propaganda was to be dissolved and the buildings appropriated. The rector appealed to Lewis Cass Jr., the chargé d'affaires of the United States diplomatic mission, to protect the citizens of the United States who were students of the college. Within an hour, the American flag was floating over the Propaganda College. The order of confiscation was withdrawn. Cass was subsequently criticised for his actions.

== Armagh and Dublin ==
Cullen was appointed Roman Catholic Archbishop of Armagh on 19 December 1849 and consecrated by the Cardinal Prefect of Propaganda at the Irish College in Rome on 24 February 1850. He was also named Apostolic Delegate. His first major act as Archbishop of Armagh was to convene the Synod of Thurles (1850), the first Roman Catholic national synod held in Ireland since the Reformation. It occurred during the period of the debilitating Irish Famine which reduced the population of the country by over 2 million people through starvation, disease and emigration. The purpose of the synod was to establish a new ecclesiastical discipline in Ireland. This included rules relating to the celebration of Mass, the administration of the sacraments and the maintenance of registers and archives.

Cullen was transferred to the See of Dublin on 1 May 1852 and 14 years later, in 1866, was made a cardinal as Cardinal Priest of San Pietro in Montorio, the first Irish cardinal.

Cullen was sent to Ireland to bring the Irish church into conformity with Roman canon law and usage and to that end he recruited new clergy and orders of religious brothers and sisters. After a series of disastrous harvest in the 1860s, he founded, with the Lord Mayor of Dublin, the Mansion House Relief Committee in 1862. Cullen also started the practice of Irish priests wearing Roman collars and being called "Father" (instead of "Mister") by their parishioners.

Cullen was particularly intent on promoting Roman Catholic religious education in Ireland. From the first days of his episcopate Cullen had planned and pursued a Roman Catholic university for Ireland. The university project was welcomed generally by the Irish at home and abroad and the beginnings of the institution in Dublin gave some promise. In 1862, the cornerstone of the new University building was laid with Archbishop Hughes of New York preaching on the occasion. John Henry Newman, whom he had invited to be Rector of the Catholic University, complained that the Archbishop treated him and the laity not as equals but as his subjects.

Cullen paid frequent visits to Rome. He took part in the definition of the dogma of the Immaculate Conception of the Blessed Virgin Mary in 1854 and with the 18th centenary of the martyrdom of Saints Peter and Paul in 1867, when he stayed at the Irish College.

He attended all the sessions of Vatican I, taking an active part in its deliberations. Towards the close of the council, at the express wish of the Central Commission, he proposed a formula for the definition of papal infallibility. It was a matter of great delicacy, as promoters of the definition were split in various factions, some anxious to assign a wide range to the pope's decisions, and others would set forth in a somewhat indefinite way the papal prerogative. In 1864, he founded the Irish Ecclesiastical Record. He arrived late to the conclave of 1878 that elected Pope Leo XIII.

== Politics ==
He was the most important Irish political figure in the 30 years between Daniel O'Connell and Charles Stuart Parnell. In political matters, Cullen made it a rule to support every measure, whatever its provenance, conducive to the interests of his vision for the Roman Catholic Church in Ireland. Desmond Bowen considers Cardinal Cullen "a cautious, suspicious, and usually shrewd product of the Roman school of diplomacy". He had a strong distrust of secret societies and waged a public campaign against the Young Irelanders and the Fenians. He supported redress by constitutional means. The Gladstone government disestablished the Church of Ireland during his episcopacy.

Cullen was a frequent visitor at the Viceregal Lodge, where he would lobby the Lord Lieutenant of Ireland and the government. In 1867, the Fenian leader, Thomas F. Burke, had been sentenced to death, and efforts to obtain a reprieve had been in vain. He had fought in the American Civil War on the side of the Confederacy, and the British government was determined to deter other skilled military leaders from enlisting with revolutionaries. The orders of execution from London were peremptory. The scaffold was already erected, and the next morning Burke was to be hanged. Through mediation from Archbishop Hughes of New York and others, Cullen became convinced of the character of the accused and was able to obtain a grant of reprieve for Burke.

== Death ==
He died at the Archiepiscopal Residence (59 Eccles Street, Dublin) of heart failure on October 24, 1878. He was buried at Holy Cross College (Clonliffe College) in Drumcondra beneath the High Altar. On 25 June 2021, his remains were transferred to St. Mary's Cathedral, Dublin. The sale of Holy Cross College required that his body be reinterred.

Addressing a small gathering in the Crypt of the Cathedral at the reinterment, Archbishop Dermot Farrell prayed: “We come together to bring the body of Cardinal Paul Cullen, my predecessor, to its new resting place. Together let us pray some Psalms that here, his body - together with all those interred in this crypt - will rest in God’s safety”.

== Legacy ==
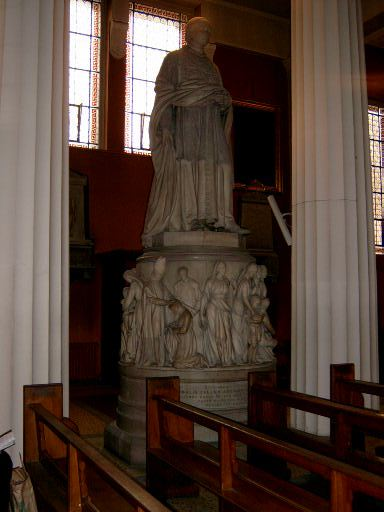
Monument to Cardinal Cullen in St Mary's Cathedral, Dublin

Cullen is most notable today for being the first Irish cardinal. With his experience and friendships in Rome he was able to influence the choice of appointments to episcopal sees in Australia, New Zealand, South Africa, and Canada. His relatives, friends, and students, referred to as "Cullenites", exerted great influence overseas, with his nephew, Patrick Francis Moran, archbishop of Sydney, one notable example. The term also refers to a style of leadership resembling that of Cullen, characterised as "authoritative" and "intransigent".

Father Thomas N. Burke, O.P., in a sermon at a solemn Requiem mass, the "Month's Mind" of 27 November 1878, said: "The guiding spirit animating, encouraging and directing the wonderful work of the Irish Catholic Church for the last twenty eight years was Paul, Cardinal Cullen."

Cullen has been credited with the revival of regular Catholic devotion in Ireland. An extreme Ultramontanist, he vigorously opposed secret societies with revolutionary aims, as well as the system of mixed education then in force. His opposition was largely responsible for the failure of Gladstone's Irish Universities Bill in 1873.

Although a devout Catholic herself, Mary Jane, wife of Jeremiah O'Donovan Rossa, wrote a blistering response in her poem, "Tis for the Glory of the Faith", to what she saw as Cullen's suggestion that Irish emigrants had the role of spreading Catholicism abroad.

Who said 'twas willed our race should be
Live monuments of misery?
To spread the faith throughout the world?
Who spoke such blasphemy, and why?
Who dared the generous God belie?

And yet thy bishops-Cullen-saith,
'Tis for the glory of Thy Faith.

And yet the Lord Chief Bishop Cullen saith
'Tis for the glory of our holy faith!

== See also ==
- St. Vincent's Industrial School, Goldenbridge

Catholic Church titles
Preceded by William Crolly	Archbishop of Armagh; 1849–1852	Succeeded by Joseph Dixon
Preceded by Daniel Murray	Archbishop of Dublin; 1852–1878	Succeeded by Edward MacCabe
