= Teresa Cowley =

Personal life
- Born: 1852 or 1857 Dunshaughlin, County Meath, Ireland
- Died: 28 November 1914

Religious life
- Religion: Roman Catholic
- Order: Sisters of Mercy

Teresa Cowley, RRC, born Jane Cowley (1852 or 1857 – 28 November 1914) was an Irish Sister of Mercy, Boer war nurse and teacher.

== Biography ==
Mother Teresa was born Jane Cowley in Dunshaughlin, County Meath, in 1852 or 1857. She was the daughter of John and Margaret Cowley (née Loughran). On 2 February 1877, she entered the Convent of Mercy in Strabane, County Tyrone. She made her first vows on 8 January 1880, taking the religious name Mary Teresa. She became superior of the Strabane convent in 1894.

Cowley led a group of five sisters in October 1897 from Strabane to South Africa as superior in response to an appeal from the Bishop of Mahikeng, Anthony Gaughran. They arrived in February 1898 and opened their first school. The Second Boer War broke out in October 1899 and Mahikeng was besieged. The convent was requisitioned as a military hospital, with the sisters nursing the wounded. For seven months, they lived in a bomb-proof shelter. Cowley was awarded the Royal Red Cross from King Edward VII on 1 October 1901 in recognition of her service during the war. She also received the South African War Medal.

After the war they rebuilt and reopened the school in 1900, and went on to establish more schools in the area, and they would travel to outlying villages on Sundays to hold classes on religious instruction. The Sisters of Mercy led a campaign to admit students regardless of race, leading to the creation of multi-racial schools. Schools and convents were opened in Braafontein, Mayfair, Minakau, Orange Farm, Pretoria, Soweto, Vryburg and Winterveladt, and a retreat house in Natal. Cowley died on 28 November 1914. She received full military honours at her funeral, with the firing party being from the Bechuanaland Rifles, and is buried in Mahikeng town cemetery.
