= Mary Francis Bridgeman =

Irish Catholic nun and nursing pioneer (1813–1888)

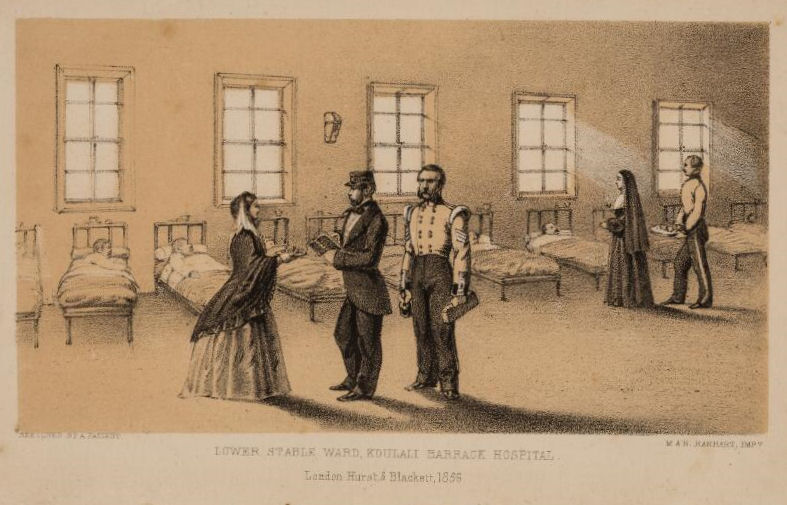
Lithograph of the Lower Stable Ward at Koulali Barrack Hospital in the Crimea showing a Sister of Mercy - possibly Mother Mary Francis Bridgeman (1856)

Mother Mary Francis Bridgeman R.S.M. (1813 – 11 February 1888) was an Irish nun with the Sisters of Mercy, a Roman Catholic religious congregation of women, founded in Ireland by Catherine McAuley and a pioneer nurse during the Crimean War of 1854–1856.

== Religious life ==
Born as Joanna Bridgeman in Ruan, County Clare in 1813, she was one of two sons and two daughters of St. John Bridgeman and Lucinda 'Lucy' née Reddan who married in February 1811. Her mother's sister was Mary Francis Xavier Warde (Joanna Reddan), one of the original Sisters of Mercy. Bridgeman was a cousin of Daniel O'Connell, the Irish political leader. After her mother died in childbirth in 1818 the 5 year-old Joanna Bridgeman went to live with her aunt's family. When an outbreak of cholera hit Limerick in 1832 Joanna Bridgeman assisted her aunt in nursing those affected.

In 1838 Bridgeman became a postulant at the convent of the Sisters of Mercy in Limerick and after a standard novitiate of a year she took her final vows in 1839 with the Founder of the Order, Catherine McAuley, taking the name Sister Mary Francis. A charismatic leader and effective administrator, by 1844 she was the convent's Mother Superior in which year she and a small group of nuns from the convent went to Kinsale in County Cork where they founded Saint Joseph's convent. Here she worked among the sick and the poor, setting up a school and running a soup kitchen. Later the Sisters founded an orphanage and an industrial school where 150 girls were trained in lace-making and embroidery in order to be able to make a living. When cholera struck Kinsale in 1849 Bridgeman and her Sisters took over the management of the local workhouse and its 2,000 inmates.

== Nursing in the Crimea ==
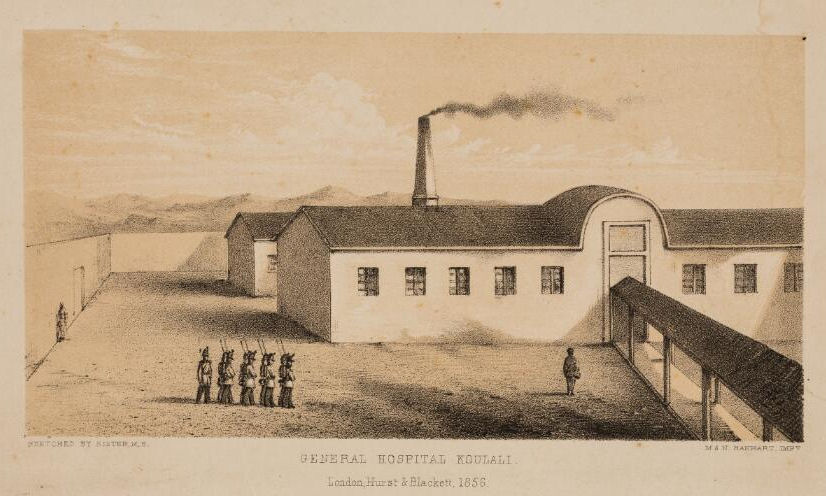
Koulali General Hospital in the Crimea in 1856

The Crimean War of 1854-56 saw many more soldiers dying from disease and lack of care rather than from wounds obtained in battle. The War Office faced a demand from the British public for experienced nurses to immediately be sent to the Crimea and it turned to Ireland for nurses with the Sisters of Mercy immediately offering their services. The Sisters wrote to the War Office on 18 October 1854 stating, 'Attendance on the sick is, as you are aware, part of our Institute; and sad experience among the poor has convinced us that, even with the advantage of medical attendance, many valuable lives are lost for want of careful nursing.' Their offer was accepted and Bridgeman and a party of 11 or 12 Sisters departed from London on 2 December 1854, travelling via Paris and Marseilles, where they boarded a ship for Constantinople in a second wave of Irish nurses after Mary Clare Moore with the intention of assisting Florence Nightingale at Scutari Hospital.

However, on reaching Constantinople on 17 December 1854 the Sisters were shocked to receive a letter from Nightingale stating that 'it was a gross mistake on the part of the war office' to send more nurses as she 'had neither accommodation nor need for more nurses at Scutari'. Apparently, in its haste to send the second wave of Irish nurses out to the Crimea the War Office and Sidney Herbert had omitted to inform Nightingale that the Sisters were en route. Nightingale was annoyed by the fact that Herbert had compromised her authority over nursing at Scutari by his accepting the second wave of Sisters of Mercy - Bridgeman and her party - with Bridgeman, who considered her party to be independent of Nightingale's control, unwilling and unable to give authority over her Sisters to a secular lady - Nightingale - at the expense of her own superiors back in Ireland. In addition, Nightingale was correct when she stated in her letter that the medical officers in The Crimea had told her they did not require any more nurses, and indeed there was no accommodation for them at the Scutari hospitals. Also, Nightingale had already overspent her nursing budget and the military was not inclined to give her more at that time.

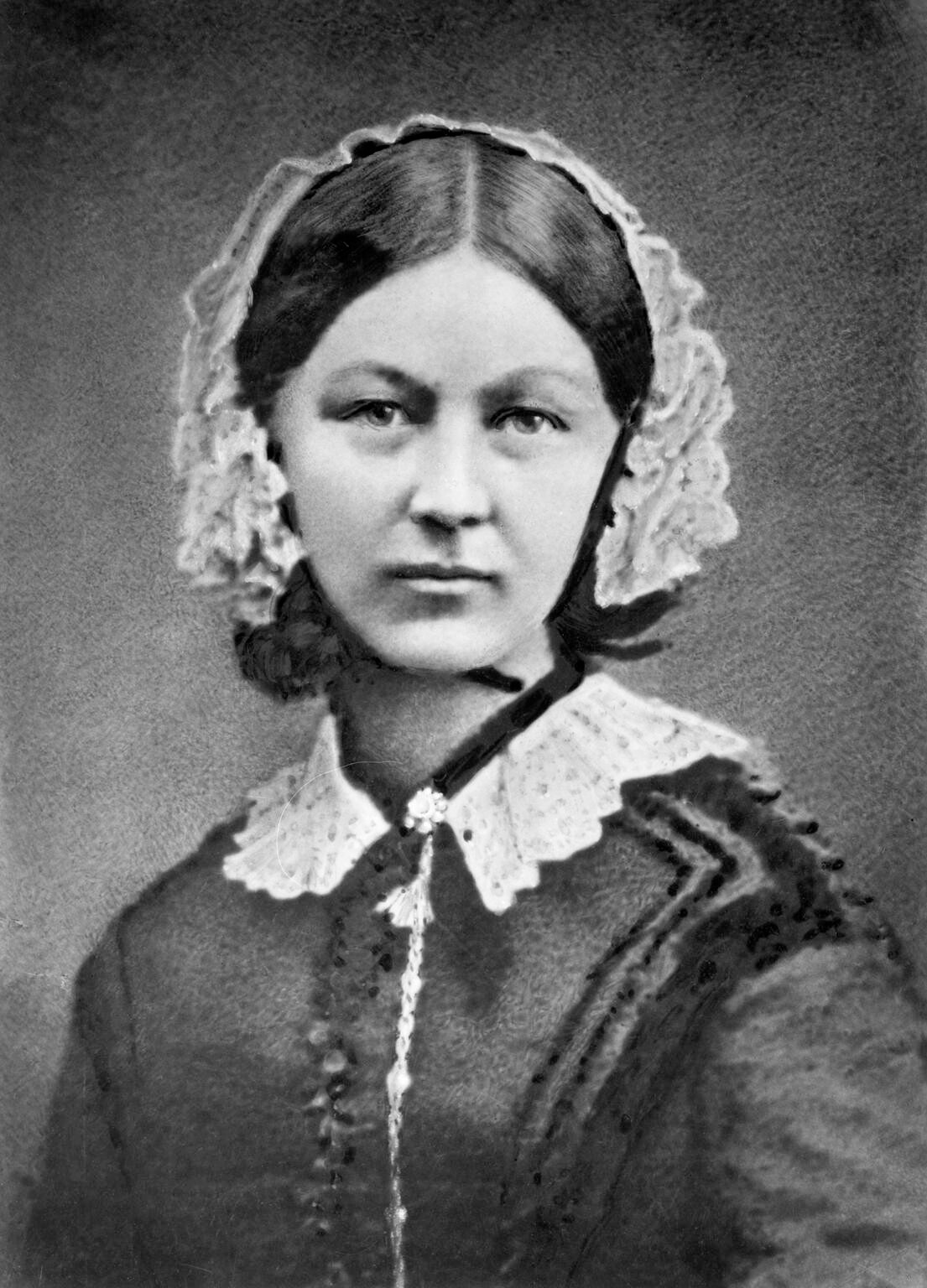
Florence Nightingale (c.1860). She referred to Bridgeman as 'Mrs. Bridgeman' and 'Reverend Mother Brickbat'

After Nightingale overcame her annoyance about not being consulted five days later she wrote the Sisters a letter welcoming them and inviting just five of the Sisters to join her at Scutari Hospital but not as nurses. Bridgeman took the letter to mean that she and her Sisters were released from their agreement with the War Office to provide nursing services at Scutari and on arriving in the Crimea in late January 1855 she arranged for her party to nurse at the Koulali General and Barrack hospitals near to Scutari. When a cholera epidemic hit the Army in the Crimea that month Bridgeman and her Sisters immediately set to work. Having already had experience of nursing cholera sufferers in their native Ireland the Sisters began treating the sick as well as tending the wounded and dying from the year-long Siege of Sebastopol, spending their last six months in the General and Hut hospitals at the frontline.

In October 1855 Dr. John Hall, Inspector-General of Hospitals in the Crimea, in a direct snub to Florence Nightingale by not consulting or informing her, appointed Bridgeman as Superintendent of the Balaclava General Hospital. This only succeeded in exacerbating the tension which already existed between Nightingale and Bridgeman which persisted throughout the rest of the military campaign, with peace being brokered by various hospital doctors and chaplains resulting in the Sisters being permitted to continue with their nursing. In several letters Nightingale referred to Bridgeman as 'Mrs. Bridgeman' and 'Reverend Mother Brickbat'. She considered that Bridgeman's presence in the war zone was particularly due to the influence of Nightingale's friend Henry Cardinal Manning, and called her "Manning's nun"; for their part, the nuns referred to Nightingale as "the Goddess of Humbug."

However, tensions also existed between Bridgeman and Mother Mary Clare Moore, who had arrived in the first wave of Irish Sisters of Mercy in October 1854. Each of the two had their own agenda, with Moore being anxious to avoid being accused of attempting to convert wounded Protestant soldiers to Catholicism; while Bridgeman could not understand how Moore could allow herself to be under the authority of Nightingale, a secular woman. Bridgeman believed that Nightingale had deliberately driven a wedge between the two groups of Sisters. She did not like or trust Nightingale and was careful to gain the support of Dr. John Hall, who also disliked Nightingale. As war in the Crimea was coming to an end Nightingale visited Bridgeman and her Sisters at the Crimean hospitals at the frontline to invite them join her at Scutari, but they declined to go. In the Crimea the Sisters introduced tried and tested systems of management and nursing details of which were requested by Nightingale. Mother Mary Francis's journal relates that 'Miss N took notes on our manner of nursing which I explained to her as she hoped someone might profit of it'. It has been suggested that the system of management and nursing introduced by Bridgeman and her Sisters in the Crimea found their way uncredited into Nightingale's report to the War Office.

When in April 1856 Nightingale regained control of Balaclava General Hospital Bridgeman immediately resigned, giving as a reason that she and her Sisters were no longer required owing to the falling numbers of sick and wounded in addition to the imminent declaration of peace. Peace was declared on 2 April 1856 and Bridgeman and the Sisters left the Crimea for England on 12 May, sailing by way of Constantinople, Malta and Gibraltar. Arriving in England on 8 May 1856, they rested for a short period in London before returning to their various convents.

== Later years ==
On returning from the Crimea Bridgeman returned to her work in Kinsale, and here she stayed until her death in 1888. The school she had founded in 1844 had grown so that 1,000 children were receiving a free education as well as being provided with hot dinners during the winter. Bridgeman oversaw the establishment of daughter houses in Ireland - at Clonakilty, Skibbereen, Newry, Doon and Ballyshannon in Ireland. She also oversaw the establishment of other houses in Derby in England and in San Francisco and Cincinnati in the United States. She published a four-volume theological work God in His Works.

Mother Mary Francis Bridgeman died on 11 February 1888 at the convent in Kinsale, County Cork.
