= Mary Teresa Cullen (nun) =

Irish nun and magazine publisher (1866–1940)

Sister Mary Teresa Cullen

Personal life
- Born: 27 August 1866 Ireland
- Died: 7 July 1940 (aged 73) Mill Hill, London, England

Religious life
- Religion: Roman Catholic
- Order: Daughters of Charity of Saint Vincent de Paul

Sister Mary Teresa Cullen also known as Sister Mary of Charity (27 August 1866 – 7 July 1940) was an Irish Daughters of Charity of Saint Vincent de Paul nun and founder of the magazine Virgo Potens.

== Early life and family ==
Mary Teresa Cullen was born on 27 August 1866. Her parents were Elizabeth (née Leonard) from County Meath and Hugh Cullen, of Liverpool. Her paternal grand-uncle was Cardinal Paul Cullen, and she had 2 paternal cousins in the priesthood, E. J. Cullen and Paul Cullen. She attended the Sacred Heart convent, Roehampton, and entered the Daughters of Charity on 27 April 1887. During this time she studied at St Vincent's, Carlisle Place, London. She transferred to North William Street, Dublin in 1892, where she took her vows. She had 8 siblings: Reverend Michael (1859–1940), Paul Mary (1860–1897), Hugh Joseph (1862–1908), Edward Mary (born 1864), Joseph (1869–1891), Elizabeth (1871–1898), Thomas Mary Joseph (25–27 January 1874), and Teresa (1875–1939). Elizabeth was also a nun in the same order, known by Sister Magdalen of Charity.

== Career ==
Cullen was placed in charge of the schools of St Agatha's parish, Dublin in 1893, and by 1898 she had increased the number of students from 100 to 1000. In her teaching she used St Catherine Labouré as her role model for students. Cullen was a disciplinarian and did not allow for laziness in her students. She expanded the curriculum to include model drawing, cookery, house-wifery, and singing, learning painting and French herself so that she could teach the subjects. She took her older pupils to lectures in the College of Science and Trinity College Dublin. Cullen also took over teaching history when the need arose. Her favourite phrase was "I mean to say, God gave you brains: you must use them". She was a supporter of the Pioneer Total Abstinence Association, and was in charge of its supply depot.

Cullen was working on North William Street during the Easter Rising in 1916, and was struck by a stray bullet in the eye. It took her years to recover from the permanent injury to her sight, resuming her duties on North William Street in 1923. On 8 December 1923 she founded the monthly magazine dedicated to "the crusade of the miraculous medal", Virgo Potens. It was a collection of fiction and religious reflections published under the motto "To Jesus through Mary", and was edited by Cullen.

After her retirement in 1930 she moved to Mill Hill, London where she translated French and wrote an unpublished autobiography, A visiting sister in Eire. Cullen used her own money to fund young men training for the priesthood and to pay for school equipment. She died in Mill Hill on 7 July 1940 and is buried at the cemetery there.
