= Sisters of Mercy =

Religious congregation

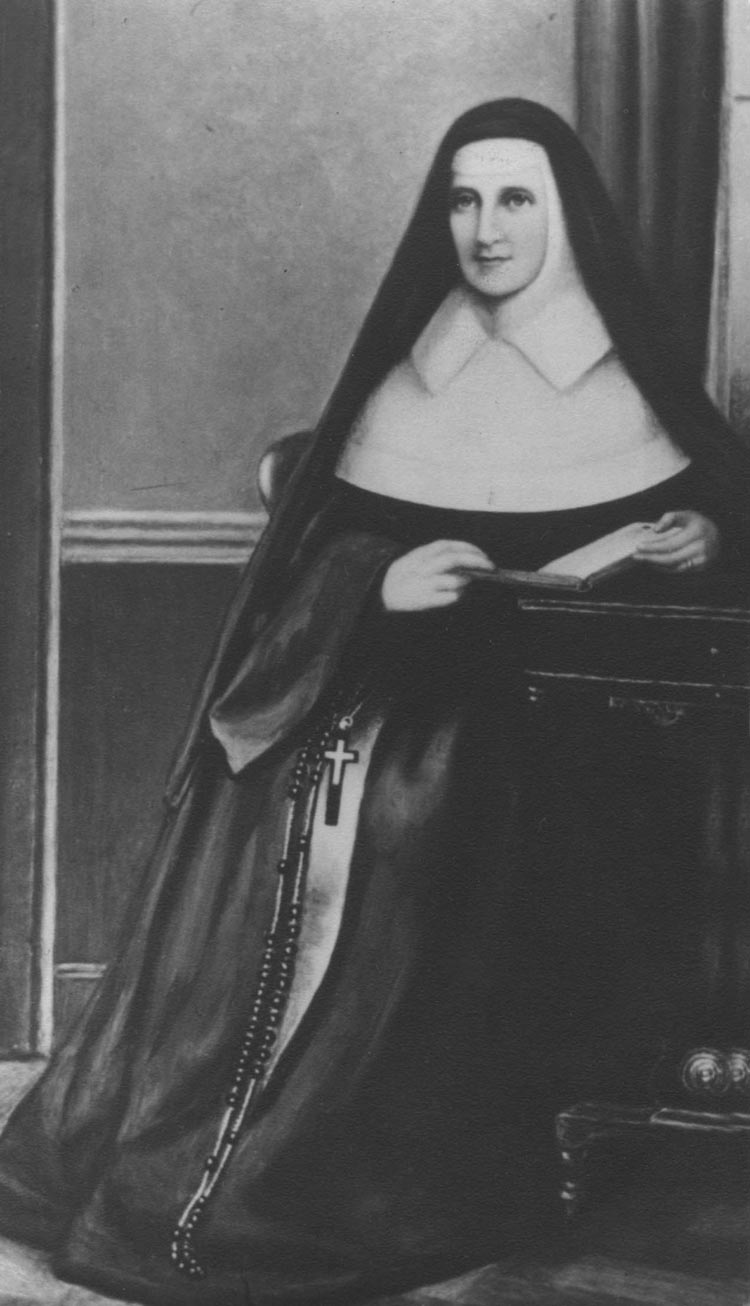
- Mother Catherine McAuley, foundress of the Religious Sisters of Mercy
- Abbreviation: RSM
- Formation: 12 December 1831; 194 years ago
- Founded at: Dublin, Ireland
- Type: Religious congregation
- Members: 11,000
- Leader: Catherine McAuley
- Website: www.mercyworld.org

The Sisters of Mercy is a religious institute for women in the Catholic Church. It was founded in 1831 in Dublin, Ireland, by Catherine McAuley. In 2019, the institute had about 6,200 sisters worldwide, organized into a number of independent congregations. Notable achievements include the foundation of education and health care facilities around the world.

== History ==
=== Founding ===
The Congregation of the Sisters of Mercy began when Catherine McAuley used an inheritance to build a large house on Baggot Street, Dublin, as a school for poor girls and a homeless shelter for servant girls and women. Local women assisted in the works of the house. There was no idea then of founding a religious institution; McAuley's plan was to establish a society of secular ladies who would spend a few hours daily in instructing the poor. Gradually the ladies adopted a black dress and cape of the same material reaching to the belt, a white collar and a lace cap and veil.

In 1828, Archbishop Daniel Murray advised McAuley to choose some name by which the little group might be known, and she chose that of "Sisters of Mercy", having the design of making the works of mercy the distinctive feature of the institute. She desired that the members should combine with the silence and prayer of the Carmelite, the active labors of a Sister of Charity. The position of the institute was anomalous, its members were not bound by vows nor were they under a particular rule.

Archbishop Murray asked the Sisters of Mercy to declare their intentions as to the future of their institute, whether it was to be classed as a religious congregation, or to become secularized. The associates unanimously decided to become religious. It was deemed better to have this congregation unconnected with any already existing community.

On the Octave of the Ascension, 1829, the archbishop blessed the chapel of the institution and dedicated it to Our Lady of Mercy. This combination of the contemplative and the active life necessary for the duties of the congregation called forth so much opposition, that it seemed as though the community of twelve must disband; but it was settled that several of the sisters should make their novitiates in some approved religious house and after their profession return to the institute to train the others to religious life.

The Presentation Sisters, whose rule was based on the Rule of St. Augustine, seemed best adapted for the training of the first novices of the new congregation and McAuley, Elizabeth Harley and Anna Maria Doyle began their novitiate at George's Hill, Dublin, on 8 September 1830. While they were in training, Frances Warde managed the affairs of the Baggot Street house.

On 12 December 1831, Catherine McAuley, Mary Ann Doyle, and Elizabeth Harley professed their religious vows as the first three Sisters of Mercy, thereby founding the congregation. In 1839, Mary Francis Bridgeman professed her vows and joined the congregation.

=== Expansion ===
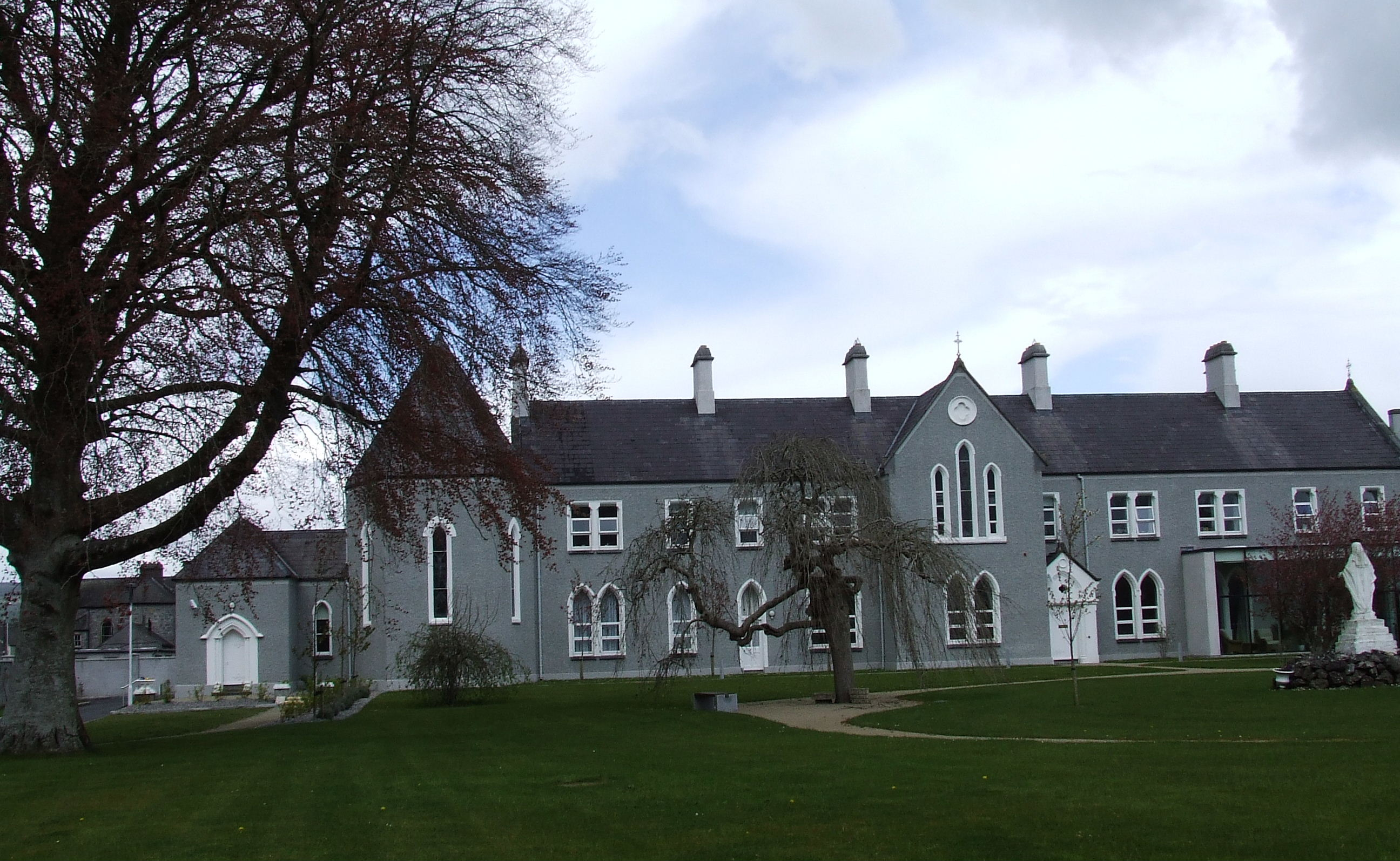
Mercy Convent, Templemore, County Tipperary

In the 10 years between the founding and her death on 11 November 1841, McAuley established additional independent foundations in Ireland and England: Tullamore (1836), Charleville (1836), Carlow (1837), Cork (1837), Limerick (1838), Bermondsey, London (1839), Galway (1840), Birr (1840), and St Mary's Convent, Birmingham (1841), as well as branch houses of the Dublin community in Kingstown (1835) and Booterstown (1838).

The Sisters offered free schools for the poor, academies for the daughters of the rising middle class, and "houses of mercy", providing shelter for poor youth and women in Dublin and other cities who were in danger of being exploited. They were called upon by bishops in several major epidemics of cholera to nurse people in homes and in the public hospitals.

Their services were in much demand. McAuley opened the first Convent of Mercy in England at Bermondsey on 19 November 1839 for the education of children and the visitation of the poor, sick, and needy. Mother Mary Clare Moore was appointed Superior. The convent was designed in the 'Gothic Style' by Augustus Pugin, his first purpose-designed religious community building. It was destroyed during World War II.

In May 1842, at the request of Bishop Fleming, a small colony of Sisters of Mercy crossed the Atlantic to found the congregation at St. John's, Newfoundland. In 1846, the sisters arrived in Perth, Australia. In the United States, the first community of Sisters of Mercy was established in Pittsburgh, Pennsylvania, in 1843, followed by Providence, Rhode Island, in 1851. Sisters from Limerick opened a house in Glasgow in 1849 and a band from Carlow, Ireland arrived in New Zealand, in 1850. In 1860, St Catharine's Convent was founded in Edinburgh and in 1868, the English community established houses in Shrewsbury and on the island of Guernsey.

=== Crimean War ===
With the London Times reporting appalling conditions at the front, the War Office appealed for volunteer nurses. On 14 October 1854, Bishop Thomas Grant, of Southwark approached the Sisters at Bermondsey. Together with other nuns, six Bermondsey Sisters of Mercy, including Mary Bernard Dickson, travelled to Crimea to work under Florence Nightingale.

=== Boer War ===
At the request of the bishop of Mahikeng, Dr Anthony Gaughran, sisters came to South Africa to found convents there. Mother Superior Teresa Cowley led a group from the convent in Strabane, with the group acting as nurses to the military during the siege of Mahikeng.

== Mercy International Association ==
In 1992 leaders of the various congregations formed the "Mercy International Association" to foster collaboration and cooperation. The Mercy International Centre is located in Dublin, and as of 2021 the association members are the Sisters of Mercy of the Americas, the Institute of the Sisters of Mercy of Australia, the Sisters of Mercy of Great Britain, the Congregation of the Sisters of Mercy (Ireland), the Nga Whaea Atawhai o Aotearoa Sisters of Mercy New Zealand, the Sisters of Mercy of Newfoundland, and the Religious Sisters of Mercy (Philippines).

== Vows and activities ==
Sisters of Mercy is an international community of Roman Catholic women religious vowed to serve people who suffer from poverty, sickness and lack of education with a special concern for women and children. Members take vows of poverty, chastity, and obedience, the evangelical counsels commonly vowed in religious life, and, in addition, vows of service.

They continue to participate in the life of the surrounding community. In keeping with their mission of serving the poor and needy, many sisters engage in teaching, medical care, and community programs. The organization is active in lobbying and politics.

== Constitution ==
The Sisters of Mercy are constituted as religious and charitable organizations in a number of countries. Mercy International Association is a registered charity in Ireland.

== Controversies ==
In 1869, Sister of Mercy, Susan Saurin, brought suit against her superiors accusing them of bullying, assault and imprisonment. She sought £5,000 in damages. The "Great Convent Case" opened at Westminster Hall with heightened press interest given Victorian antipathy to all things Roman Catholic. The Daily Telegraph made a special publication on the "Inner Life of the Hull Nunnery Exposed" to cover the trial. Saurin won her case and was awarded fifty pounds in damages.

In May 2009, the institute was among four religious congregations for women that came under scrutiny and criticism for their part in running Magdalene laundries in past decades, where women were brought by the state, or their families, for being unmarried and pregnant, or for other reasons. The report found that girls supervised by congregations or orders, chiefly the Sisters of Mercy, suffered much less sexual abuse, but instead endured frequent assaults and humiliation.

The Mercy Sisters have noted they were not compensated for caring for the women and that the laundries were not profit-making ventures. "We acknowledge fully the limitations of the service we provided for these women when compared with today's standards and sincerely wish that it could have been different. We trust that the implications of the changed context are understood by the wider society."

In 2011, as part of their Sculpture Trail initiative, the Ennis Tidy Towns Committee erected a statue at the site of the old St. Xavier's Primary School, now the Clare Museum. Created by Barry Wrafter, it was commissioned to celebrate the work of the Sisters of Mercy since their coming to the town in 1854.

== Schools founded or run by Sisters of Mercy ==
=== Australia ===
- Academy of Mary Immaculate, Fitzroy, Victoria
- All Hallows' School, Brisbane, Queensland
- Aranmore Catholic College, Leederville, Western Australia
- Bunbury Catholic College, Bunbury, Western Australia
- Catherine McAuley College, Bendigo, Victoria
- Catherine McAuley School, Westmead, New South Wales
- Damascus College, Ballarat, Victoria
- Holy Cross Primary School, Wooloowin, Queensland
- Holy Spirit Primary School, North Ryde, New South Wales
- Mercedes College, Adelaide, South Australia
- Mercedes College, Perth, Western Australia
- Mercy College, Coburg, Victoria
- Mercy College, Koondoola, Western Australia
- Monte Sant' Angelo Mercy College, North Sydney, New South Wales
- Mount Lilydale Mercy College, Lilydale, Victoria
- Our Lady of Lourdes, Dardanup, Western Australia
- Our Lady of Lourdes, Earlwood, New South Wales
- Our Lady of Mercy College, Heidelberg, Victoria
- Our Lady of Mercy College, Parramatta, New South Wales
- Our Lady of the Sacred Heart Catholic Primary School, Springsure, Queensland
- Padua College, Mornington, Victoria
- Patrick's College Australia, Sydney, New South Wales
- Sacred Heart College, Kyneton, Victoria
- Sacred Heart College, Geelong, Victoria
- Santa Maria College, Attadale, Western Australia
- St Ann's College, Victoria (amalgamated in 1991 to form Emmanuel College, Warrnambool, Victoria)
- St Aloysius' College (Adelaide)
- St Aloysius' College, Melbourne, Victoria
- St Anthony's, Girraween, New South Wales
- St Augustine's Catholic Primary School, Mossman, Queensland
- St Brigid's College, Lesmurdie, Western Australia
- St Mary's College, Gunnedah, New South Wales
- St John's Catholic Primary School, Cobar, New South Wales
- St Joseph's Catholic Primary School, Mackay, Queensland
- St Mary's College, Erskineville, Sydney, New South Wales
- St Patrick's College, Townsville, Queensland
- St Patricks, Primary School, Wallsend, New South Wales
- St Saviour's College, Toowoomba, Queensland
- St Saviour's Primary School, Toowoomba, Queensland
- Star of the Sea School, Adelaide, South Australia
- Ursula Frayne Catholic College, Perth, Western Australia

=== Canada ===
- Academy of Our Lady of Mercy, St. John's, Newfoundland
- St. Augustine's Elementary School, St. John's, Newfoundland
- St. Bride's College, St. John's, Newfoundland

=== Ireland ===
- Carysfort College, Dublin
- Coláiste Íosagáin, County Dublin
- Coláiste Muire, Ennis, County Clare
- Convent of Mercy, Ballymahon, County Longford
- Convent of Mercy, Navan, County Meath
- Convent of Mercy, Templemore, County Tipperary
- Convent of Mercy, Roscommon, County Roscommon
- Mary Immaculate College, Limerick
- Mercy Secondary School, Mounthawk, Tralee, County Kerry
- Mount Mercy College, Cork City, Cork
- Mount Saint Michael, Rosscarbery County Cork
- Mount Saint Michael's Secondary School, County Mayo
- Our Lady of Mercy Secondary School, Longford
- Our Lady of Mercy Secondary School, Waterford
- Sacred Heart Secondary School, Clonakilty, County Cork
- Sacred Heart Secondary School, Tullamore, County Offaly
- Sacred Heart Secondary School, County Louth
- Sancta Maria College, Ballyroan, Dublin
- Scoil an Spioraid Naoimh, County Cork
- Scoil Mhuire, Buncrana
- St Anne's Technical School, Kilcormac, County Offaly
- St Augustine's Industrial School for Girls, Templemore, County Tipperary
- Our Lady's Secondary School, Castleblayney, County Monaghan
- St. Joseph's National School, Tullamore, County Offaly
- Saint Joseph's National School for girls, Portumna, County Galway
- St Joseph's Secondary School, Tulla, County Clare
- St Joseph's Secondary School, Rochfortbridge, County Westmeath
- St Leo's College, Carlow
- St Mary's College, Arklow, County Wicklow
- St Mary's College, Naas, County Kildare
- St Mary's Secondary School, Ballina, County Mayo
- St Mary's Secondary School, Macroom, County Cork
- St Mary's Secondary School, Charleville, County Cork
- St Raphael's College, Loughrea, County Galway
- St Vincent's Secondary School, Dundalk, County Louth
- Mercy Secondary School, Kilbeggan, County Westmeath

=== Guyana ===
- St John Bosco Boys Orphanage, Georgetown
- Mercy Wings Academic Foundation, Georgetown

=== Jamaica ===
- Convent of Mercy "Alpha" Academy, Kingston
- St. John Bosco Boys Home, Mandeville
- Mount Saint Joseph Preparatory School, Mandeville

=== New Zealand ===
In 1849 Bishop Pompallier visited St Leo's Convent in Carlow, Ireland, seeking sisters to emigrate; eight left from St Leo's, led by Mother Mary Cecilia. They travelled to New Zealand, learning Māori along the way, establishing the Sisters of Mercy in Auckland as the first female religious community in New Zealand in 1850.

- Carmel College, Milford, Auckland
- Holy Cross School, Papatoetoe, Auckland
- Moreau College, Dunedin
- McAuley High School, Ōtāhuhu, Auckland
- Our Lady of the Sacred Heart School, Epsom, Auckland
- Pompallier Catholic School, Kaitaia
- Sacred Heart Cathedral School, Thorndon, Wellington
- St Bernard's School, Wellington
- St Catherine's College, Wellington
- St Josephs School, Takapuna, Auckland
- St Mary's College, Auckland
- St Mary's College, Christchurch
- St Mary's College, Wellington
- St Mary's School, Avondale, Auckland
- St Mary's in the City Primary School, Christchurch
- St Mary's Primary School, Gore
- St Michael's School, Rotorua
- St Peter's College, Gore
- St Philomena's College, Dunedin
- Villa Maria College, Christchurch

=== Philippines ===
- Holy Infant College, Tacloban City
- Assumption Academy, Tanauan, Leyte
- Cathedral School of La Naval, Naval, Biliran
- Holy Cross High School, Camp Philips, Bukidnon
- Holy Child High School, Villaba, Leyte

=== United Kingdom ===
- Broughton Hall High School, Liverpool
- Maricourt Catholic High School, Maghull
- Mercy College Belfast, Belfast Northern Ireland
- Mercy Primary School, Belfast, Northern Ireland
- Mount Lourdes Grammar School, Enniskillen, County Fermanagh
- Our Lady's Abingdon, Abingdon-on-Thames
- Our Lady's Grammar School, Newry, County Down Northern Ireland
- Star of the Sea Primary School, Warrenpoint, County Down, Northern Ireland
- St Anne’s High School, Wolsingham, Co. Durham
- St Anthony's Girls' Catholic Academy, Sunderland
- St. Catherine's School, Twickenham
- St Edward's, Lisson Grove, Marylebone, London
- St Eugene's Senior School, Francis Street, Derry, Northern Ireland
- St Eugene's Infant School, Francis Street, Derry, Northern Ireland
- Thornhill College, Culmore, County Londonderry, Northern Ireland
- St Fanchea's College, Enniskillen, County Fermanagh, Northern Ireland
- St Joseph's Convent Preparatory School, Gravesend, Kent
- St Joseph's Primary School, Newry, County Down, Northern Ireland
- St Joseph's Convent School, Crackley, Kenilworth, Warwickshire
- St Joseph's Convent School, Wanstead
- St Joseph's in the Park, Hertingfordbury Park, Hertford, Hertfordshire
- St Mary's College, Derry, Northern Ireland
- St Joseph's Park Hill School, Burnley
- St Patrick's School, Wolverhampton, Wolverhampton
- St Philip Howard Catholic Primary School, Hatfield
- St Thomas of Aquin's High School, Edinburgh, Scotland
- St Ursula's School, Bristol
- St Winefride's School, Shrewsbury
- The McAuley Catholic High School, Doncaster

=== United States ===
- Academy of Our Lady of Mercy, Lauralton Hall, Milford, Connecticut
- Assumption High School, Louisville, Kentucky
- Carlow University, Pittsburgh
- Catherine McAuley High School for Girls, New York City
- Georgian Court University, Lakewood, New Jersey
- Gwynedd Mercy University, Gwynedd Valley, Pennsylvania
- Holy Family Holy Name School, New Bedford, Massachusetts
- Holy Trinity Catholic School, Des Moines, Iowa
- Immaculate Conception Cathedral School, Memphis, Tennessee
- Little Flower School, New York City
- Little Flower School, Reno, Nevada
- Maria College, Albany, New York
- Mercy Academy, Louisville, Kentucky
- Mercy High School, Farmington Hills, Michigan
- Mercy University, Dobbs Ferry, New York
- Mercymount Country Day School, Cumberland, Rhode Island
- Mercyhurst University, Erie, Pennsylvania
- Merion Mercy Academy, Merion Station, Pennsylvania
- Misericordia University, Dallas, Pennsylvania
- Mother McAuley Liberal Arts High School, Chicago
- Mount Aloysius College, Cresson, Pennsylvania
- Mount de Sales Academy (Georgia), Macon, Georgia
- Mount Mercy Academy, Buffalo, New York
- Mount Mercy University, Cedar Rapids, Iowa
- Mount Saint Agnes College, Baltimore
- Mount Saint Mary Academy, Manchester, New Hampshire
- Mount Saint Mary Academy, Watchung, New Jersey
- Mount St. Mary Academy (Little Rock, Arkansas), Little Rock, Arkansas
- Notre Dame High School, Elmira, New York
- Notre Dame High School, Lawrenceville, New Jersey
- Our Lady Academy, Bay St. Louis, Mississippi
- Our Lady of Mercy School for Young Women, Rochester, New York
- Saint Aloysius High School, Vicksburg, Mississippi
- St. Bernard Academy, Nashville, Tennessee
- Saint John the Baptist School, Costa Mesa, California
- Saint Joseph Catholic High School, Jackson, Mississippi
- Saint Xavier University, Chicago
- Salve Regina University Newport, Rhode Island
- St. Mary Academy - Bay View, Riverside, Rhode Island
- St. Peter's Catholic School, San Francisco
- St. Vincent's Academy, Savannah, Georgia
- Trocaire College, Buffalo, New York
- University of Detroit Mercy, Detroit, Michigan
- University of Saint Joseph (Connecticut), West Hartford, Connecticut
- Walsingham Academy, Williamsburg, Virginia

== Hospitals and healthcare work ==
=== Australia ===
- Mater Misericordiae Hospital, Brisbane
- Mater Misericordiae Hospital, Bundaberg
- Mater Misericordiae Hospital, Gladstone
- Mater Misericordiae Hospital, Newcastle
- Mater Misericordiae Hospital, Mackay
- Mater Misericordiae Hospital, Rockhampton
- Mater Misericordiae Hospital, Townsville
- Mater Misericordiae Hospital, North Sydney

=== Canada ===
- St.Clare's Mercy Hospital, St. John's

=== Ireland ===
- Mater Misericordiae University Hospital, Dublin
- National Rehabilitation Hospital (Dublin)

=== Philippines ===
- Mother of Mercy Hospital, Tacloban

== Sisters of Mercy of the Americas ==
Michael O'Connor was born in Cobh, Ireland. In June 1841, O'Connor was appointed Vicar General of Western Pennsylvania, and two years later, Bishop of the newly constituted Diocese of Pittsburgh. He traveled to Rome for his consecration and on his return, stopped in Ireland to recruit clergy for his new diocese, obtaining eight seminarians from St. Patrick's College, Maynooth, and seven Sisters of Mercy from Carlow, Ireland. The sisters arrived in Pittsburgh in December 1843, with Frances Warde as superior. Mercy Hospital in Wilkes-Barre, Pennsylvania opened 1898.

In 1858, Mother Mary Teresa Maher led a group of ten Sisters of Mercy to Cincinnati from Kinsale, Ireland. In 1892, the eleven Sisters of Mercy came to Cincinnati at the invitation of Archbishop John Baptist Purcell. They soon opened a Night School for Young Women. Mercy Hospital in Hamilton, Ohio was founded in 1892. Mother of Mercy High School was founded in 1915. They also direct Bethany House Services for homeless women and children.

By the 1920s, there were 39 separate Sisters of Mercy congregations across the United States and Latin America. In 1929, the "Sisters of Mercy of the Union" was founded, merging many of the congregations into one single entity with nine provinces. Seventeen communities remained independent. A federation of all the Mercy congregations was formed and in the 1970s, and a common constitution was developed. Further work toward consolidation continued, and in July 1991, the "Sisters of Mercy of the Americas" was established. In December 2018, the sisters marked 175 years in the United States.

In July 2017 "Mercy Education System of the Americas" (MESA) was formally established to unite and serve the Mercy education ministries in Argentina, Belize, Guam, Honduras, Jamaica, the Philippines and the United States.

The Religious Sisters of Mercy of Alma are a separate congregation of women religious. They developed from the Sisters of Mercy, and were established as an institute of pontifical right, in 1973.

=== Education in the Americas ===
- Christ the Teacher Catholic School, Newark, Delaware
- Gwynedd-Mercy Academy Elementary, Spring House, PA
- Mount Saint Mary High School, Oklahoma City, Oklahoma
- Mater Christi School, Burlington, Vermont
- Mercymount Country Day School, Cumberland, Rhode Island
- Our Lady of Mercy, Hicksville, New York
- Our Lady of Mount Carmel Regional School, Berlin, New Jersey
- Saint Helena School, pre-kindergarten to eight grade, Center Square, Pennsylvania
- Saint John the Baptist elementary school, kindergarten to eighth grade, New Bedford, Massachusetts
- Saint Johns Catholic School, kindergarten to eighth grade, Collingswood, NJ
- St. Vincent de Paul elementary school, kindergarten to eighth grade, San Diego, California
- Saint John The Apostle elementary school, kindergarten to eighth grade, Hialeah, Florida
- Mother McAuley Liberal Arts High School, Chicago, Illinois
- Waldron Mercy Academy Merion Station, Pennsylvania

==== Secondary schools ====
- Academy of Our Lady of Mercy:Lauralton Hall, Milford, Connecticut
- Assumption High School, Louisville, Kentucky
- Bishop Feehan High School, Attleboro, Massachusetts
- Bishop McGann-Mercy Diocesan High School, Riverhead, New York
- Camden Catholic High School Cherry Hill NJ
- Catherine McAuley High School, Brooklyn, New York
- Cristo Rey High School, Sacramento, California (co-sponsored with the California Province of the Society of Jesus)
- Gwynedd Mercy Academy High School, Lower Gwynedd Township, Pennsylvania
- Marquette High School, Ottawa, Illinois (originally St. Xavier's Academy)
- McAuley Catholic High School, Joplin, Missouri
- Mercy Academy, Louisville, Kentucky
- Mercy High School, Baltimore, Maryland
- Mercy High School, Burlingame, California
- Mercy High School, Farmington Hills, Michigan
- Mercy High School, Middletown, Connecticut
- Mercy High School, Omaha, Nebraska
- Mercy High School, Red Bluff, California
- Mercy High School, San Francisco, California
- Mercy McAuley High School, Cincinnati, Ohio
- Mercy Montessori Center, Cincinnati, Ohio
- Mercyhurst Preparatory School, Erie, Pennsylvania
- Mercymount Country Day School, Cumberland, Rhode Island
- Merion Mercy Academy, Merion Station, Pennsylvania
- Mother McAuley Liberal Arts High School, Chicago, Illinois
- Mount de Sales Academy, Macon, Georgia
- Mount Mercy Academy, Buffalo, New York
- Mount St. Mary Academy, Little Rock, Arkansas
- Mount Saint Mary Academy, Watchung, New Jersey
- Mount St. Mary High School, Oklahoma
- Notre Dame High School, Lawrenceville, New Jersey
- Our Lady of Mercy Academy, Syosset, New York
- Our Lady of Mercy High School, Rochester, New York
- Our Lady of Victory Academy, Dobbs Ferry, New York
- Sacred Heart School, Jacksonville, Florida
- Sacred Heart School, Hattiesburg, Mississippi
- Saint Bernard Academy, Nashville, Tennessee
- St. Mary Academy - Bay View, East Providence, Rhode Island
- Saint Raymond of Penafort, Philadelphia, Pennsylvania
- St.Catharine Academy, Bronx, New York
- Saint Stephen School, San Francisco, California
- St. Vincent's Academy, Savannah, Georgia
- Sisters Academy, Asbury Park, New Jersey
- Walsingham Academy, Williamsburg, Virginia

==== Colleges and universities ====
- Carlow University, Pittsburgh, Pennsylvania
- College of St. Mary, Omaha, Nebraska
- Georgian Court University, Lakewood, New Jersey
- Gwynedd Mercy University, Gwynedd Valley, Pennsylvania
- Maria College, Albany, New York
- Marian Court College, Swampscott, Massachusetts
- Mercy University, Dobbs Ferry, New York
- Mercy College of Ohio, Toledo, Ohio
- Mercy School of Health Sciences, Des Moines, Iowa
- Mercyhurst University, Erie, Pennsylvania
- Misericordia University, Dallas, Pennsylvania
- Mount Aloysius College, Cresson, Pennsylvania
- Mount Mercy University, Cedar Rapids, Iowa
- Saint Joseph's College of Maine, Standish, Maine
- Saint Xavier University, Chicago, Illinois
- Salve Regina University, Newport, Rhode Island
- Trocaire College, Buffalo, New York
- University of Detroit Mercy, Detroit, Michigan (previously Mercy College of Detroit; University co-sponsored with Society of Jesus)
- University of Saint Joseph, West Hartford, Connecticut

==== Defunct ====
- Catherine McAuley High School, Portland, Maine
- Mercy High School, St. Louis, Missouri
- Mother of Mercy High School, Cincinnati, Ohio
- Mount Saint Agnes College (merged with Loyola University Maryland)
- Mount Saint Mary's Seminary High School (merged with Bishop Guertin High School), Nashua NH
- St. Francis Xavier Academy (1851–1977); Providence, Rhode Island
- Trinity College (merged with University of Vermont), Burlington, VT
- McAuley High School, Toledo, Ohio
- Precious Blood Grade School, Chicago, Illinois

==== Belize ====
- St. Catherine Academy, Belize City
- Muffles College (Secondary School in Orange Walk Town)
- Muffles Junior College (Associate degree-offering institution)

==== Honduras ====
- Instituto María Regina (La Ceiba, Honduras)

=== Healthcare in the Americas ===
The Sisters founded dozens of hospitals in the United States, and sponsors, or co-sponsors, six health systems. The organization also operates health care ministries in Belize, Guam, Guyana, Peru and the Philippines.

In 1883, they founded The Retreat, A Home for Friendless Girls for unwed expecting mothers in Toledo, Ohio. The hospital changed names and locations several times over the years before closing as Riverside Mercy Hospital in 2002.

In 1892, they founded Mercy Hospital in Hamilton, Ohio. "With lots of heavy industry in Hamilton at the time, there was a lot of need for emergency care for accident victims."

In 1893, they founded Mercy Hospital in Des Moines, Iowa

In 1916, the Sisters of Mercy established Sisters of Mercy's St. Joseph's Sanitarium, in Asheville, North Carolina, to treat tuberculosis patients, which later became St. Joseph's Hospital. In 1998, St. Joseph's Hospital was sold to Memorial Mission Hospital. The Sisters continue to operate urgent care centers in the Asheville area, under the name Sisters of Mercy Urgent Care.

Mercy Health is a nonprofit Catholic healthcare organization in the Midwestern United States, and is headquartered in the suburban western St. Louis County suburb of Chesterfield, Missouri.

=== Healthcare systems ===
Healthcare systems sponsored by, co-sponsored by, or with historical ties to the Sisters of Mercy of the Americas include:

- AMITA Health
- Mercy, St. Louis, Missouri
- Mercy Cedar Rapids, Cedar Rapids, Iowa
- Mercy Iowa City, Iowa City, Iowa
- Mercy Medical Center Baltimore, Maryland
- Mercy Hospital, Oklahoma City, Oklahoma
- Mercy Urgent Care, Asheville, North Carolina
- Northern Light Mercy Hospital, Portland, Maine
- Scripps Mercy Hospital, San Diego
- St. Joseph's/Candler Health System, Savannah
- Trinity Health
  - Catholic Health, Buffalo
  - Holy Cross Hospital, Fort Lauderdale
- UPMC Mercy, Pittsburgh

== See also ==
- Magdalen Asylum
- Nora Wall
