= Catherine McAuley =

Irish nun and saint (1778–1841)

Venerable Catherine McAuley RSM
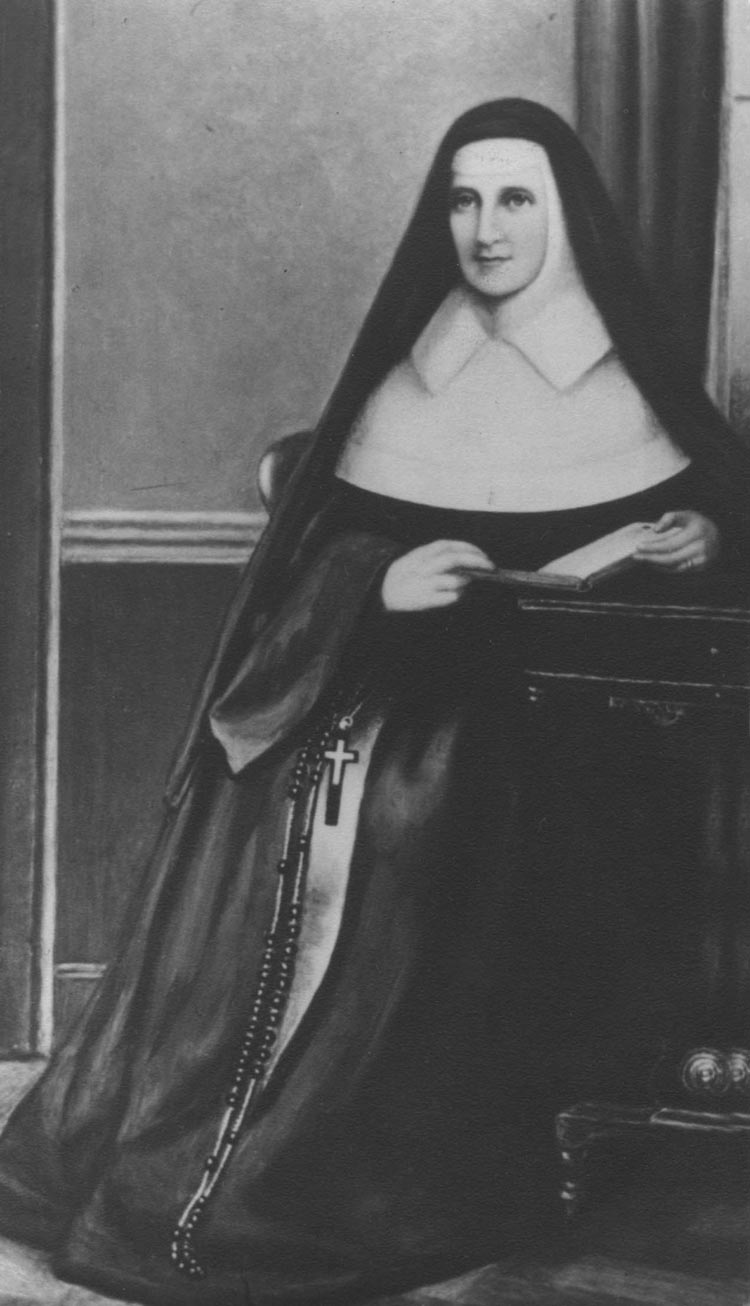
- Daguerreotype of Venerable Mary Catherine McAuley (ca. 1840)
- Born: 29 September 1778; Dublin, Ireland
- Died: 11 November 1841 (aged 63); Dublin, Ireland

Catherine Elizabeth McAuley, RSM (29 September 1778 – 11 November 1841) was an Irish Catholic religious sister who founded the Sisters of Mercy in 1831. The women's congregation has always been associated with teaching, especially in Ireland, where the sisters taught Catholics (and at times Protestants) at a time when education was mainly reserved for members of the established Church of Ireland.

== Early life and education ==
Catherine Elizabeth McAuley was born in 1778 at Stormestown House in Dublin, Ireland, to James and Elinor (née Conway) McAuley. Her father died in 1783 when she was five and her mother died in 1798, when she was 20. McAuley went first to live with a maternal uncle, Owen Conway, and later joined her brother James and sister Mary at the home of William Armstrong, a Protestant relative on her mother's side.

In 1803, McAuley became the household manager and companion of William and Catherine Callaghan, an elderly, childless, and wealthy Protestant couple and friends of the Armstrongs, at their estate in Coolock, a village northeast of Dublin. For 20 years she gave catechetical instruction to the household servants and the poor village children. Catherine Callaghan, who was raised in the Quaker tradition, died in 1819. When William Callaghan died in 1822, Catherine McAuley became the sole residuary legatee of their estate.

== Religious ministry ==
=== The House of Mercy, 1824 ===
McAuley inherited a considerable fortune and chose to use it to build a house where she and other compassionate women could take in homeless women and children to provide care and education for them. A location was selected at the junction of Lower Baggot Street and Herbert Street, Dublin, and in June 1824, the cornerstone was laid by the Rev. Dr. Blake. As it was being refurbished, she studied current educational methods in preparation for her new endeavour. On the feast of Our Lady of Mercy, 24 September 1827, the new institution for destitute women, orphans, and schools for the poor was opened and Catherine McAuley, with two companions (Anna Maria Doyle and Catherine Byrn), undertook its management.

For three years, Catherine McAuley and her companions continued their work. McAuley never intended to found a community of religious women; her initial intention was to assemble a corps of Catholic social workers. In 1828, the archbishop permitted the staff of the institute to assume a distinctive habit and to publicly visit the sick. The habit adopted was a black tunic and cape of the same material reaching to the belt, a white collar, and a lace cap and veil. In the same year, the archbishop desired a name for the community, and McAuley chose "Sisters of Mercy".

McAuley desired that the members should combine the silence and prayer of the Carmelites with the active labours of a Sister of Charity.

While setting up the House of Mercy, McAuley was also raising nine children from her own family; four from her cousin Anne Conway Byrn and five from her sister Mary, both of whom died young.

=== Sisters of Mercy, 1831 ===
The Archbishop of Dublin urged her to form a religious institute. In September 1830, McAuley and two other women, Anna Maria Doyle and Elizabeth Harley, entered the novitiate of the Presentation Sisters to formally prepare for life as religious. On 12 December 1831 they professed vows and returned to the House of Mercy. The Sisters of Mercy consider 12 December 1831 as the day of their founding. Archbishop Daniel Murray assisted McAuley in founding the Sisters of Mercy, and accepted the vows of the first three new sisters. He then appointed McAuley as Mother Superior. The rule of the Sisters of Mercy was formally confirmed by Pope Gregory XVI on 6 June 1841.

The 1826–1837 cholera pandemic hit Dublin in 1832, and McAuley agreed to staff a cholera hospital on Townsend Street. Between 1831 and 1841 she founded additional communities in Tullamore, Charleville, Cork, Carlow, Galway, Limerick, Birr, Bermondsey and Birmingham and branch houses in Kingstown and Booterstown.

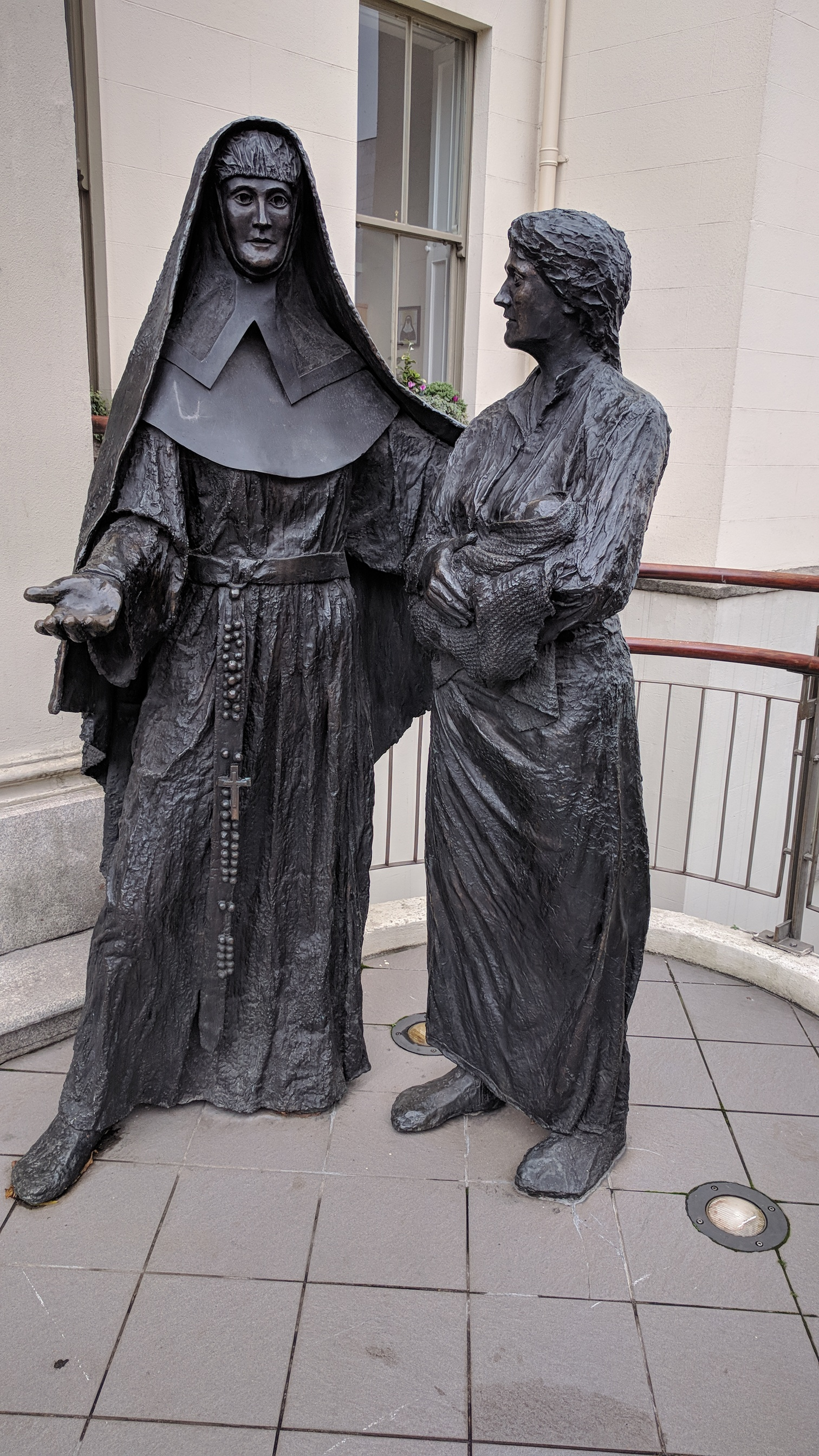
Statue of Catherine McAuley in Dublin's Baggot Street

McAuley died of tuberculosis on 11 November 1841 at Baggot Street, at the age of sixty-three.

== Legacy ==
At the time of McAuley's death in 1841, there were 100 Sisters of Mercy in ten foundations. Shortly thereafter, small groups of sisters left Ireland to establish new foundations on the east and west coasts of the United States, in Britain, Newfoundland, Australia, New Zealand, and Argentina.

In 2025 there were 6,000 Sisters of Mercy worldwide. There were also 5,000 associates, and close to half a million partners in ministry. The Mercy International Centre in Dublin, Ireland, is the international "home" of Mercy worldwide.

== Beatification process ==
In 1978, Pope Paul VI opened the beatification process of Catherine McAuley. In 1990, upon recognition of her heroic virtue, Pope John Paul II declared her venerable. The postulator for the cause is Brenda Dolphin RSM.

== See also ==
- List of people on the postage stamps of Ireland
- Series C banknotes
- Mary Frances Xavier Warde
