= Northam =

Northam or North Ham, may refer to:

== People ==
- Northam (surname)
- Northam Warren (1878–1962), U.S. inventor

== Places ==
- Northam, Devon - a town in Devon, England, UK
  - Northam railway station (Devon)
- Northam, South Africa - a small town in North West Province, South Africa
- Northam, Southampton - A district of the city of Southampton, England, UK
  - Northam Bridge, River Itchen
- Northam, Western Australia - a town and shire in Western Australia, Australia
  - Northam railway station, Western Australia
  - Northam Post Office
  - Town of Northam - a local government area
  - Shire of Northam - a shire
  - Electoral district of Northam
- Northam Road, George Town, Penang, Malaysia

== Other uses ==
- Battle of Northam (1069), Northam, Devonshire, England, UK

== See also ==
- Old Northam Road, Perth, Western Australia, Australia
- North Ham, the northern part of Ham, London, England, UK
- Ham-Nord (English: Ham North), Quebec, Canada
- Northam railway station (disambiguation), several stations
- North (disambiguation)
- Ham (disambiguation)
