= Richmond Road =

Richmond Road may refer to:

- Richmond Road, a continuation of Greenhill Road, Adelaide, South Australia
- Richmond Road, a historic road name still used as the name for a segment of U.S. Route 25 in Lexington, Kentucky and between the cities of Lexington and Richmond (see Roads in Lexington, Kentucky)
- Richmond Road, Sydney
- Richmond Road (Ohio), now State Route 175
- Richmond Road (Ontario)
- Richmond Avenue, Staten Island, New York City
- Richmond Road (Staten Island), another major road in the borough of Staten Island
- Richmond Road, Williamsburg, Virginia (Virginia Route 60)
- Richmond Road Halt railway station, a closed railway station in Devon, England

== See also ==
- Richmond Highway (disambiguation)
- Richmond Parkway (disambiguation)
