= Lovers' Lane Halt railway station =

Former railway station in Devon, England

Lovers' Lane Halt
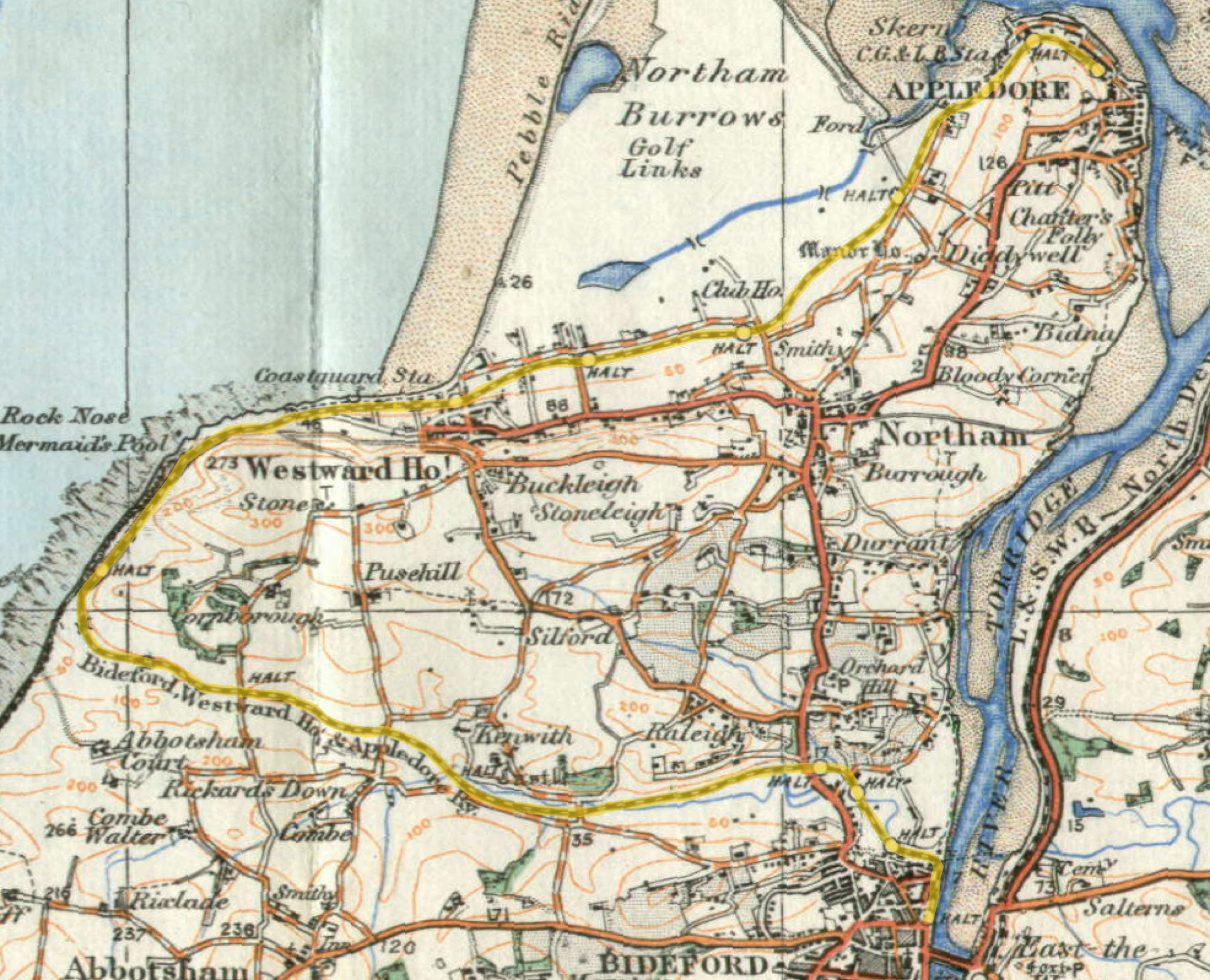
- A map showing the site of the halt

General information
- Location: Appledore, Torridge; England
- Coordinates: 51.0563°N 4.1981°W
- Grid reference: SS460308
- Platforms: 1

Other information
- Status: Disused

History
- Original company: Bideford, Westward Ho! and Appledore Railway
- Pre-grouping: British Electric Traction

Key dates
- 1 May 1908: Opened
- 28 March 1917: Closed
Location

Lovers' Lane Halt railway station was a minor railway station or halt in north Devon close to the town of Appledore, a community lying on the peninsula formed by the sea (Barnstaple Bay), the River Torridge, and the River Taw.

== History ==
The halt was opened in 1908. The next station was Appledore, the terminus of the line lying some 7½ miles from Bideford. The line had until 1901 run only as far as Northam.

Lovers' Lane had a simple single platform, raised one foot above rail level, without any shelter and without lighting. It had no freight facilities. It was at the road junction with the Mount (0.3 miles from Watertown) with steps running down towards the lifeboat station.

The station had a short life, closing in March 1917. The trackbed from Appledore to Richmond Road Halt was converted into a road and the platform removed in the process.

== See also ==
- Northam station
- Westward Ho! station
- Appledore station

Preceding station	Disused railways	Following station
Appledore; Line and station closed	Bideford, Westward Ho! and Appledore Railway	Richmond Road Halt; Line and station closed
