= Richmond Highway =

Richmond Highway is the name of multiple highways and transit routes in Virginia:

- Richmond Highway Express, limited-stop bus route in Northern Virginia
- U.S. Route 1 in Virginia, named Richmond Highway through Richmond and Northern Virginia
- U.S. Route 60 in Virginia, named Richmond Highway through Amherst County; also named Richmond Road in Williamsburg
- U.S. Route 360, named Richmond Highway through Essex County
- U.S. Route 460 in Virginia, named Richmond Highway through Appomattox and Campbell Counties
- Virginia State Route 110, named Richmond Highway in Arlington

== See also ==
- Richmond Parkway (disambiguation)
- Richmond Road (disambiguation)
