= Northam railway station =

Northam railway station may refer to:

- Northam railway station (Devon), England
- Northam railway station (Hampshire), England
- Northam railway station, Western Australia

== See also ==
- Northam (disambiguation)
