= Appledore railway station (Devon) =

Former railway station in Devon, England

Appledore
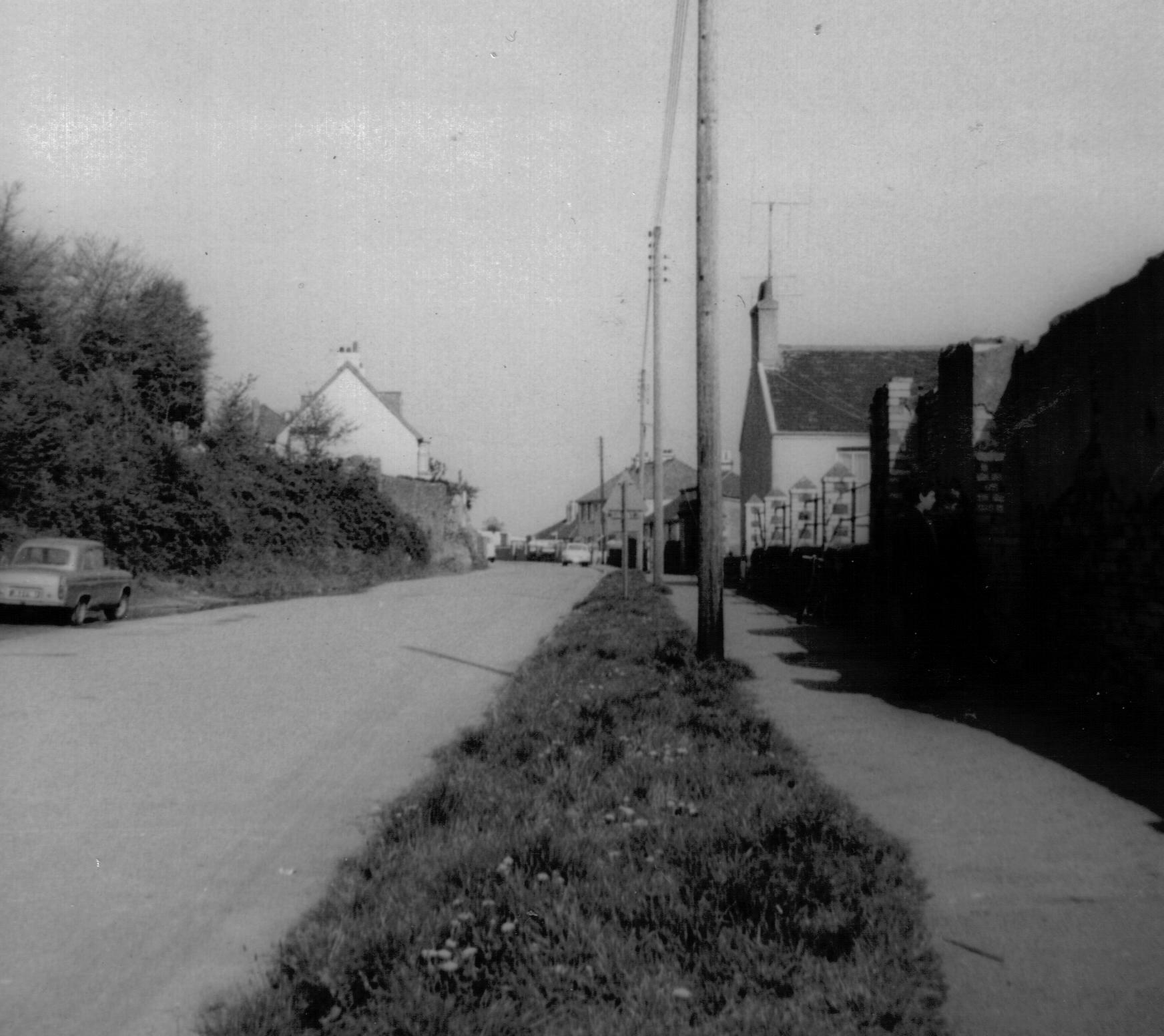
- The old railway route and ruins of Appledore station

General information
- Location: Appledore, Torridge; England
- Coordinates: 51.0561°N 4.1950°W
- Grid reference: SS463307
- Platforms: 1

Other information
- Status: Disused

History
- Original company: Bideford, Westward Ho! and Appledore Railway
- Pre-grouping: British Electric Traction

Key dates
- 1 May 1908: Opened
- 28 March 1917: Closed
Location

Appledore railway station was a railway station in north Devon, situated close to the village of Appledore, a community lying on the peninsula formed by the sea (Bideford Bay), the River Torridge, and the River Taw.

== History ==
The station was, from 1 May 1908, the terminus of a line running some 7 1/2 miles (12.1 km) from Bideford. This line had until 1901 run only as far as Northam. Mr Harold Robert Moody was the station master. The station closed on 28 March 1917 when the locomotives were taken away for use in World War 1.

=== Infrastructure ===
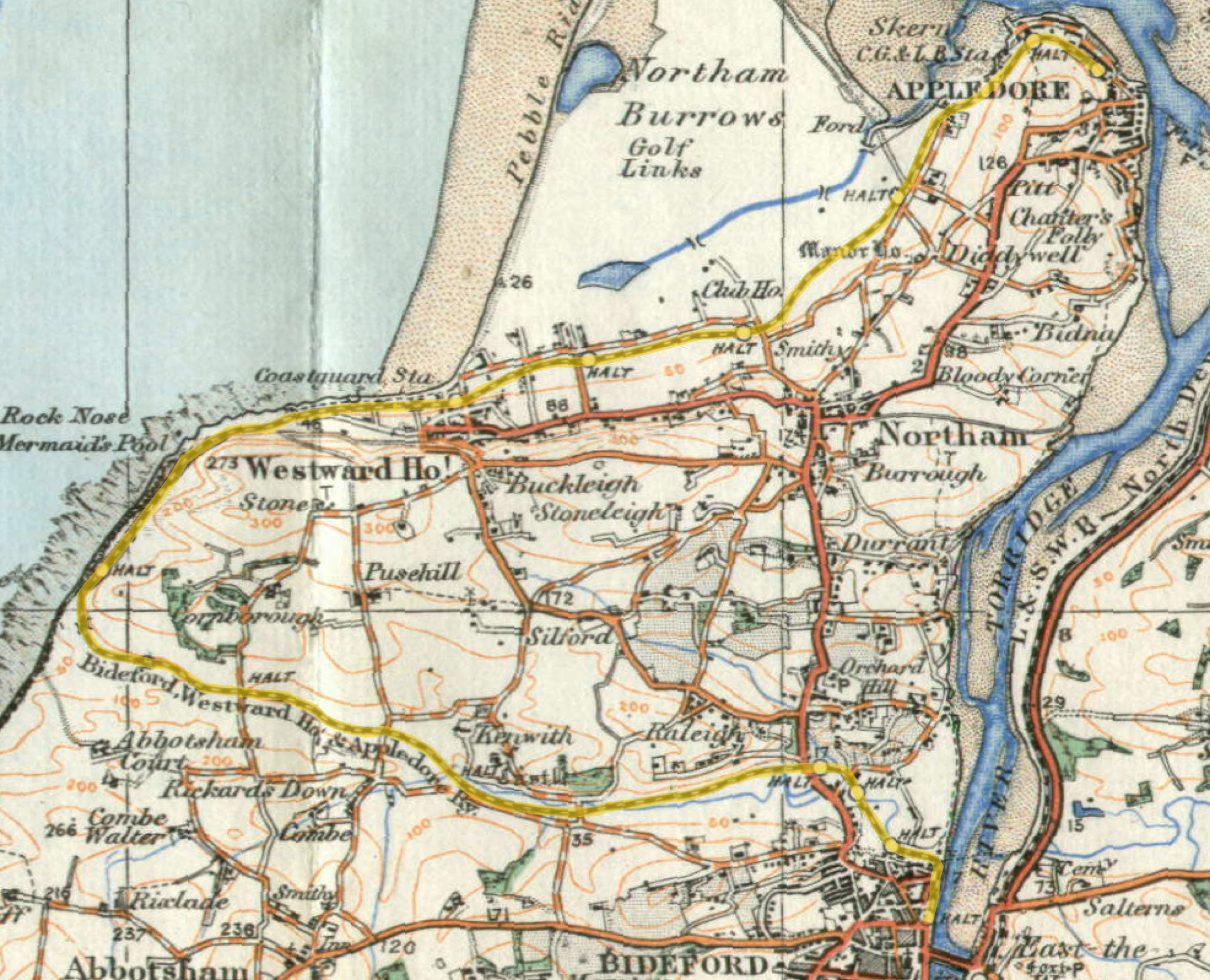
The route of the railway.

Appledore had a 300-foot (91 m) long, 1-foot (30 cm) high platform, situated on the down side of the line. Brick built public toilets, a general and ladies waiting rooms and ticket office were provided, similar in appearance to those built at Westward Ho!. Two railway cottages were built at the site. The station had gas lighting and was unique for the line in having a footbridge; this allowed access from Irsha Street to nearby allotments.

A run-round loop was provided, together with a dead-end siding, engine shed, water tower, hydrant, and coal store. The signal cabin, situated on the platform, had ten levers and the station was controlled by up, down, and distant signals. An example of the unusual B,WH&AR single post buffer stop was at the end of the siding.

== Micro history ==
A terracotta memorial entitled 'Appledore station', on a background of locomotive wheels and gearing, produced by ceramic artist Maggie Curtis, commemorates the old station.

The trackbed from Appledore to Richmond Road Halt was converted into a road in 1935 and the station buildings were demolished apart from the back wall.

== See also ==
- Northam station
- Westward Ho! station

Preceding station	Disused railways	Following station
Terminus	Bideford, Westward Ho! and Appledore Railway	Lovers' Lane Halt; Line and station closed
