= Clarence Raybould =

English conductor, pianist and composer

- Clarence Raybould conducting in 1931
- Born: 28 June 1886; Birmingham, England
- Died: 27 March 1972 (aged 85); Bideford, Devon, England
- Occupations: Conductor, composer, pianist
- Years active: 1912–1958

Robert Clarence Raybould (28 June 1886 – 27 March 1972) was an English conductor, pianist and composer who conducted works ranging from musical comedy and operetta, Gilbert and Sullivan to the standard classical repertoire. He also championed works by contemporary, particularly British, composers.

== Biography ==
Raybould was born in Birmingham in June 1886 to Robert James Raybould (born 1862), a printer compositor, and Ellen Amelia Raybould (née Weston, born 1862). He studied under Sir Granville Bantock and in 1912 became the first person to receive a BMus degree at Birmingham University.

He assisted Rutland Boughton at early Glastonbury festivals, working later with the Beecham Opera Company and the British National Opera Company. His opera The Sumida River (with a libretto by Marie Stopes adapted from the same Japanese Noh play as, and anticipating Benjamin Britten's Curlew River), was premiered in Birmingham on 25 September 1916. When Britten learned of Raybould's opera in 1958, he commented, "Actually I didn't know that C. Raybould even composed. Don't let it worry us. But what a funny coincidence."

Raybould toured Britain as a pianist and accompanist and was musical advisor for the Columbia Graphophone Company between 1927 and 1931. He was the Director of the Senior Orchestra at the Royal Academy of Music.

He joined the BBC in 1936 and was assistant conductor of the BBC Symphony Orchestra from 1939 to 1945. He conducted the first British concert performance of Hindemith's opera Cardillac in 1936 as well as that of Mathis der Maler in 1939.

In 1943 Raybould was sent a score of Britten's Matinées Musicales by Erwin Stein of Boosey and Hawkes in the hope that he would conduct it. Raybould, alluding to Britten's pacifism, replied saying that "the score is of no interest to me because of the composer's personal views and behaviour, I was going to say politically, but expand this to 'nationally'. I have the utmost contempt for the whole gang of young people who are dodging the country's call." Raybould later apologised to Britten for this "very angry and hot-headed communication".

On 9 May 1951, Raybould conducted the London Symphony Orchestra in their first concert in the recently opened Royal Festival Hall.

Raybould became the first conductor of the National Youth Orchestra of Wales in 1945, and was its principal conductor until 1966.

=== 1956 tour to Russia ===
After Joseph Stalin's death in 1953 when his successor Nikita Khrushchev admitted "past mistakes", cultural exchange became a possibility, and selected Soviet artists such as David Oistrakh began to appear in Britain. So when Sir Arthur Bliss, Master of the Queen's Music, arranged for a representative group of six British musicians, including Raybould, to tour the USSR in 1956, it was a high-profile event: the result of painstaking negotiation and cause for intense curiosity on both sides of the Iron Curtain.

According to a carefully worded Times appraisal it was "not an official mission but the outcome, with official blessing, of a personal invitation" to Bliss. Khrushchev was himself involved in the tour, and the plan was to programme modern British music alongside its Soviet equivalent in the course of sixteen concerts over three weeks.

Leaving London on 14 April 1956, the delegates were confronted with the practical consequences of the cold war: no direct flights to Russia. They flew British European Airways to Copenhagen, then a Finnish flight to Helsinki, followed by another Finnish flight to Moscow.

Soprano Jennifer Vyvyan's diary notes the "poor food" on the British European Airways flight and the gruelling length of the journey, which left her too ill and tired on arrival to do much except sleep for the next few days. But the Russians turned the arrival into a media event, with the composers Kabalevsky and Khatchaturian and the pianist Tatyana Nikolayeva welcoming the plane on its touchdown just before midnight. Every one of the sixteen concerts was sold out in advance, and the musicians found themselves instant celebrities, acknowledged in the street and pursued by journalists in their hotel rooms.

The programme started on 17 April with a public rehearsal of the Moscow State Symphony Orchestra under Raybould, playing Bliss's Violin Concerto (with Alfredo Campoli), Arnold Cooke's Oboe Concerto (Léon Goossens), some Elgar, some Kabalevsky, and one of Vyvyan's standard arias: Mozart's "Martern aller Arten" from Die Entführung aus dem Serail. That evening Cyril Smith and Phyllis Sellick played Beethoven and Vaughan Williams in the Great Hall of the Conservatory. On 19 April Raybould conducted the Moscow State Symphony Orchestra in the premiere of Gordon Jacob's oboe concerto with Léon Goossens as soloist. The group also performed in Leningrad, Kiev and Kharkov, and returned to Moscow for a farewell concert attended by Khrushchev

== Death ==
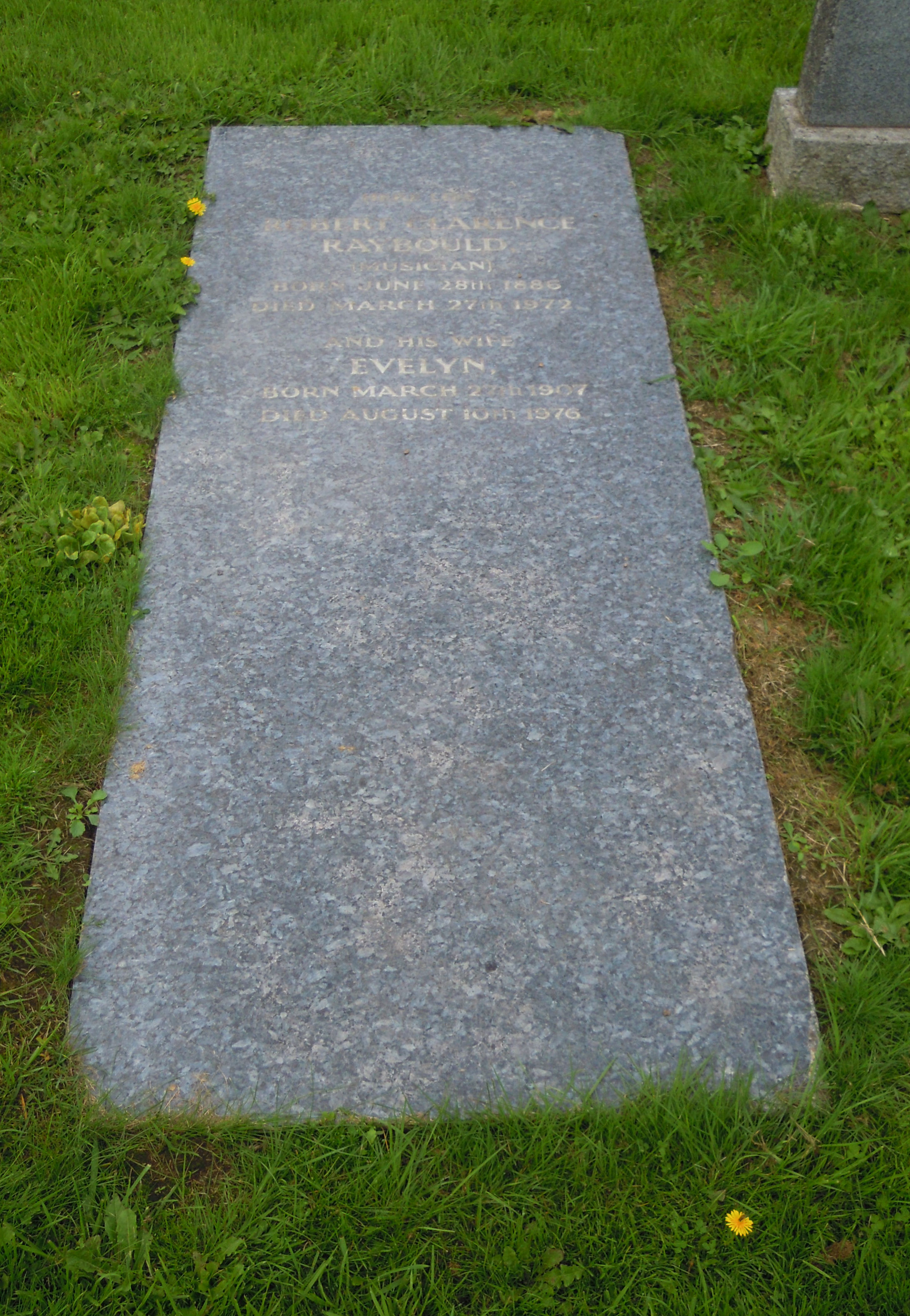
Raybould's grave in the churchyard of St Margaret's church in Northam, Devon

Raybould lived at Oakdale, East-the-Water, Bideford in Devon, where he died in 1972, aged 86. He was survived by his second wife Evelyn (27 March 1907 – 10 August 1976). They are buried together in the churchyard of St Margaret's church in Northam.

== Selected compositions ==
- The Sumida River, opera (1916)
- Score for Paul Rotha's Rising Tide and Contact (1933)
- Dance Serenade, for cello and piano (1937)
- A Legend, for cello and piano (1937)
- Three Pieces (Prelude, A Fairy Tale and Passepied) for piano solo (1938)
- Dorothy, for six-part mixed voices (1948)
- The Wistful Shepherd for clarinet and piano
- Four Songs (Merciles Beautie, In the Red April, Crepuscule and The Flower Girl)

== First performances ==
- Britten – King Arthur (1937), BBC Orch, 23 April 1937
- Ernest Bloch Les Poèmes de la Mer, UK premiere, BBCSO, 22 October 1937
- Granville Bantock – Five Ghazals of Hafiz with a prelude for baritone and orchestra, BBC Orch, 15 December 1937
- Britten – Kermesse canadienne (1939), BBCSO, 6 June 1940
- Philip Prosper Sainton – Symphonic Poem The Island (1939), BBC Orch, London, 5 June 1942

== Recordings ==
- First complete recording of Purcell's Dido and Aeneas. Clarence Raybould (conductor). Decca X101-7, 1936
- Mozart Concert Rondo in A, K386. Clarence Raybould (conductor) with Eileen Joyce (piano). 5 February 1936, Parlophone
- Elgar Sea Pictures, excerpts. Clarence Raybould (conductor), Mary Jarred (contralto) and BBC Symphony Orchestra
- Fauré Vocalise-étude in E minor. Clarence Raybould (piano) with Leon Goossens (oboe). Oboe Classics. CC2005.
- Bax Winter Legends, Viola Sonata, A Mountain Mood, A Hill Tune. Clarence Raybould (conductor) with Harriet Cohen (piano), William Primrose (viola) and the BBC Symphony Orchestra. Dutton. CDBP9751.
- Mozart "Fra gli amplessi" from Così fan tutte. Clarence Raybould (conductor) with Ina Souez (soprano) and Heddle Nash (tenor)

== Notable broadcasts ==
- Prokofiev Alexander Nevsky – a play based on the film broadcast on BBC radio on 26 April 1942 with Michael Redgrave (Nevsky) and the BBC Symphony Orchestra, Chorus and Theatre Chorus, Clarence Raybould, conductor
- Bliss Peace Fanfare for Children. BBC SO/Clarence Raybould. BBC Home Service. Children's Hour, broadcast 8 May 1945 (VE Day).
