= HMS Appledore =

One ship and two shore establishments of the British Royal Navy have been named HMS Appledore, after the village in Devon.

- Appledore (1919–1920), a Hunt-class minesweeper.
- Appledore (1942–1948), a Combined Operations base and training establishment at Fremington, Devon.
- Appledore II (1943–1946), a Combined Operations base at Ilfracombe.
