= Alice Ravenhill =

Author and educator

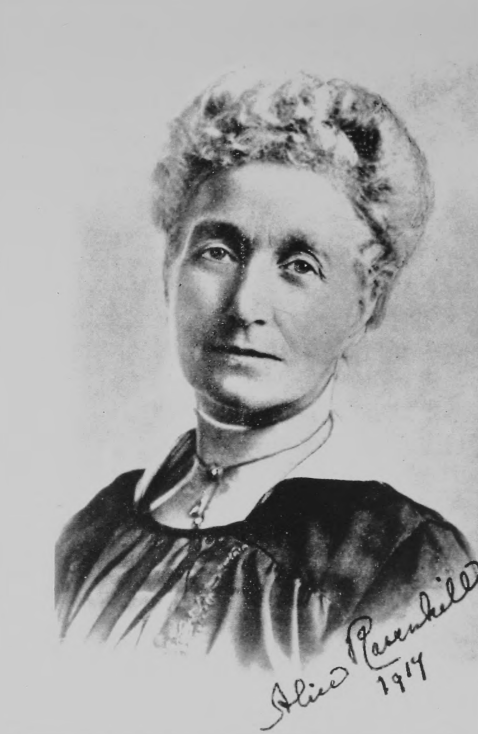
- Alice Ravenhill in 1917
- Born: 1859; Snaresbrook
- Died: 1954 (aged 94–95)
- Occupation: educationalist
- Known for: educational pioneer, a developer of Women's Institutes, and one of the first authors to propound aboriginal rights

Alice Ravenhill (1859, Epping Forest, England – 1954, British Columbia) was an educational pioneer, a developer of Women's Institutes, and one of the first authors to propound aboriginal rights in B.C. She is also the author of numerous articles and books, including her autobiography which she wrote when she was 92.

== Biography ==
=== Early life and education ===
Ravenhill was born in 1859 in Snaresbrook, then part of the Epping Forest district of Essex.

She grew up as the middle child in a well-to-do English household, one with servants and a level of schooling that was still unusual for girls of her time. Early in life she took an interest in social issues, causing her to undertake studies in public health, child development, and home economics. Study suited her temperament and she pursued every subject with interest and determination.

Her father had other plans. Instead of an education and career, he hoped she would focus her energy on finding a suitable husband. She did find a match and became engaged to marry, but thinking her fiancé unworthy, her father broke off the engagement. Ironically, the rejected suitor later became a prominent surgeon.

Ravenhill was undaunted and committed fully to her education, earning a diploma in National Health in 1892. That qualification marked the beginning of her long professional involvement with public health and social welfare. Ravenhill never married.

=== Early career in England ===
She qualified as a sanitary inspector in London. She began her career as an educator in 1893, as a county council lecturer in Bedfordshire and Lincolnshire. In 1894, Ravenhill began three years' service as the secretary to the Royal British Nurses' Association. This was followed by working two years as a lecturer to the Co-operative Society and Women's Co-operative Guild.

At the start of the twentieth century, Ravenhill became a lecturer in Social and Household Science at the University of London.

As a representative of the British Board of Education, Ravenhill travelled to the United States to learn more about the teaching of home economics in American universities.

Through her studies and work activities, Ravenhill became a leader in developing home economics curricula in post-secondary institutions. She was also active in social welfare issues and was the first woman elected as a Fellow of the Royal Sanitary Institute.

In 1908, hygiene lecturer Ravenhill, Hilda D. Oakeley and Thereza Rucker created a home science course at King's College, London in the Women's Department. Ravenhill had already developed the idea in 1901–1905. By 1920 it was a subject for a degree and in 1928 the King's College of Household and Social Science was formed to further their initial idea.

=== Emigration to Canada ===
In 1910, Ravenhill emigrated to Canada and settled at Shawnigan Lake on Vancouver Island with her sister Edith, brother Horace, and Horace's son Leslie. She planned to stay only three or four years until her nephew was sufficiently independent, however, World War I intervened and her beloved nephew was killed in the Second Battle of Ypres. Ravenhill never returned to England, remaining in Canada for the rest of her life.

Soon after settling in the province, Ravenhill began working with the BC Department of Agriculture, lending her experience to the newly formed Women's Institutes. Her work focused on offering practical education that supported women in managing their homes and communities.

One of her first public appearances in British Columbia was at the Local Council of Women conference in Vancouver in 1911. Child welfare became a major part of her work, and she was regarded as a steady and reliable contributor to social welfare efforts. She later travelled throughout the province giving talks on home management, women's health, child care, hygiene, and nutrition. Through these activities she became known as an expert on domestic science and family welfare.

Ravenhill was a charter member and the first secretary of the Shawnigan Women's Institute when it was created in 1914.

She organized branches of the Women's Institute and travelled extensively throughout the United States and Canada as a lecturer, until accepting the post as Director of Home Economics at the State College in Logan, Utah. Ravenhill held this position until 1919 at which point she became very ill and had to return to British Columbia to convalesce for several years in Victoria with nursing care by her sister Edith.

== Writing career ==
Ravenhill wrote extensively throughout her career, producing articles, textbooks, cultural studies, and later an autobiography. Her early work in public health and home economics led to publications intended for educational use, including Lessons in Practical Hygiene for Use in Schools (1907).

After moving to Canada and becoming involved with Women's Institute branches, she continued writing for educational and community audiences. Her work shifted in the 1920s when she was asked to research Indigenous designs for rug hooking. This project led to long-term study of Indigenous cultures in British Columbia and to several publications on the subject. In 1938 she produced The Native Tribes of British Columbia, written as an elementary school curriculum text.

Her growing commitment to Indigenous arts and rights continued through her role in founding the Society for the Furtherance of Indian Arts and Crafts in British Columbia in 1940.. During its first eighteen months, she wrote more than one thousand letters advocating for Indigenous artistic recognition and cultural preservation. She also helped facilitate the publication of two children's books by students at the Inkameep Indian School and St. George's Indian Residential School. "Tale of the Nativity" which was done by Anthony Walsh's students at the Inkameep Indian School, and "Meet Mr. Coyote", done by Noel Stewart and his students at St. George's Indian Residential School in Lytton, B.C.

Ravenhill remained active as an author into her nineties. Her later works include A Corner Stone of Canadian Culture: An Outline of the Arts and Crafts of the Indian Tribes of British Columbia (1944), Folklore of the Far West (1953), and her autobiography, Memoirs of an Educational Pioneer (1951).

== Books ==
Ravenhill left her papers, including articles written by her, to the Special Collections division of the UBC Library . Books written by Ravenhill include:

- Lessons In Practical Hygiene For Use In Schools (1907)
- Moral Instruction And Training In Girls’ Elementary Schools In England (1908)
- The Native Tribes of British Columbia (1938)
- A Corner Stone of Canadian Culture: An Outline of the Arts and Crafts of the Indian Tribes of British Columbia (1944)
- Memoirs of an Educational Pioneer (1951)
- Folklore of the Far West, With Some Clues to Characteristics and Customs (1953)

== Legacy and honours ==
Ravenhill received an honorary Doctor of Science from the University of British Columbia in 1948 and an honorary Doctor of Home Economics from the American Association of Home Economics in 1950.

In 2008, Ravenhill was designated as a Person of National Historic Significance by the Government of Canada. A plaque associated with this designation is located at 1775 Shawnigan Lake-Mill Bay Road, Shawnigan Lake, British Columbia.

== Sources ==
- BC Bookworld biography
- Ravenhill, Alice, Memoirs of an Educational Pioneer
