= North Devon Maritime Museum =

Museum in north Devon, England

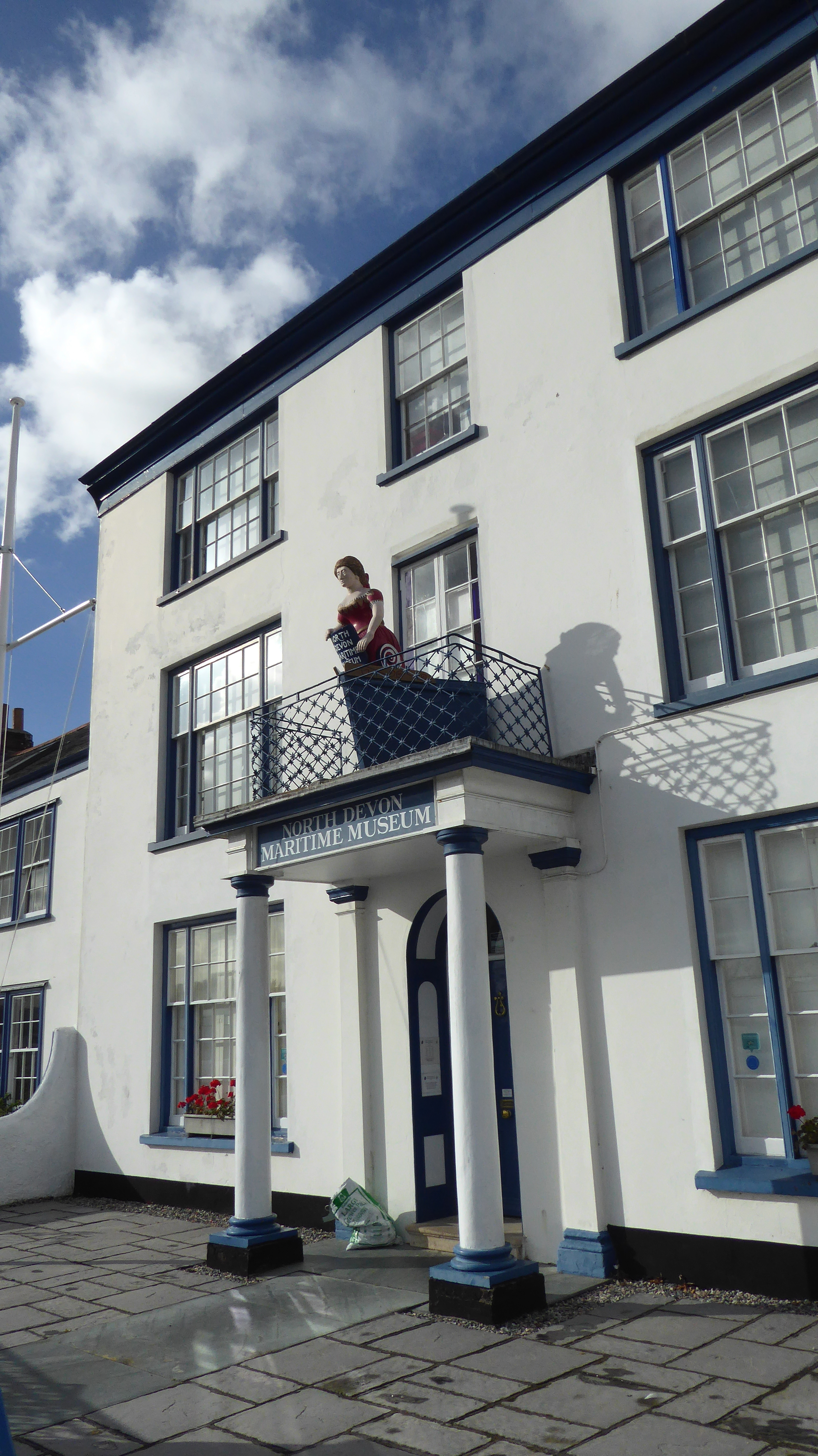
- North Devon Maritime Museum
- Established: 1977; 49 years ago
- Location: Appledore, Torridge, Devon, England
- Coordinates: 51°03′09″N 4°11′39″W
- Type: Maritime; Local history
- Key holdings: Shipbuilding and seafaring history of Devon
- Owner: Jonathon Band (since 2017)
- Website: Official website

The North Devon Maritime Museum is a museum situated in the estuary town of Appledore, Devon, England. Housed in Odun House, a Georgian Grade II listed building which has been the home of several ship owners and master mariners over the past 200 years, the museum opened in 1977. It is open from early April/Easter to the end of October each year and has an admission charge.

== History ==
The North Devon Maritime Museum has displays showing the shipbuilding and seafaring history of North Devon. It has seven exhibition rooms in which visitors can explore Hobart's Funnies - the World War II beach landing experiments carried out in the area including the Great Panjandrum, Swiss Roll, amphibious tanks and the 'Frogmen'; sail and steam vessels; shipwrecks; historical exhibits; models, dioramas and photographs and paintings covering North Devon's international maritime trades. Among the exhibits are a model of HMS Bideford, made from timbers salvaged from the original ship; a display on the history of Appledore's Richmond Dock, which opened in the 19th century and which is now a Grade II listed site of international importance, and artifacts from the career of Admiral Sir Robin Durnford-Slater KCB.

In April 2017 Admiral Sir Jonathon Band reopened the museum in celebration of its 40th birthday and its success in purchasing the museum building from Torridge District Council. The museum is possessed of an extensive library and archive which is available to bona fide researchers by appointment. The museum and gift shop are staffed by volunteers.
