= Arthur Rucker =

British physicist

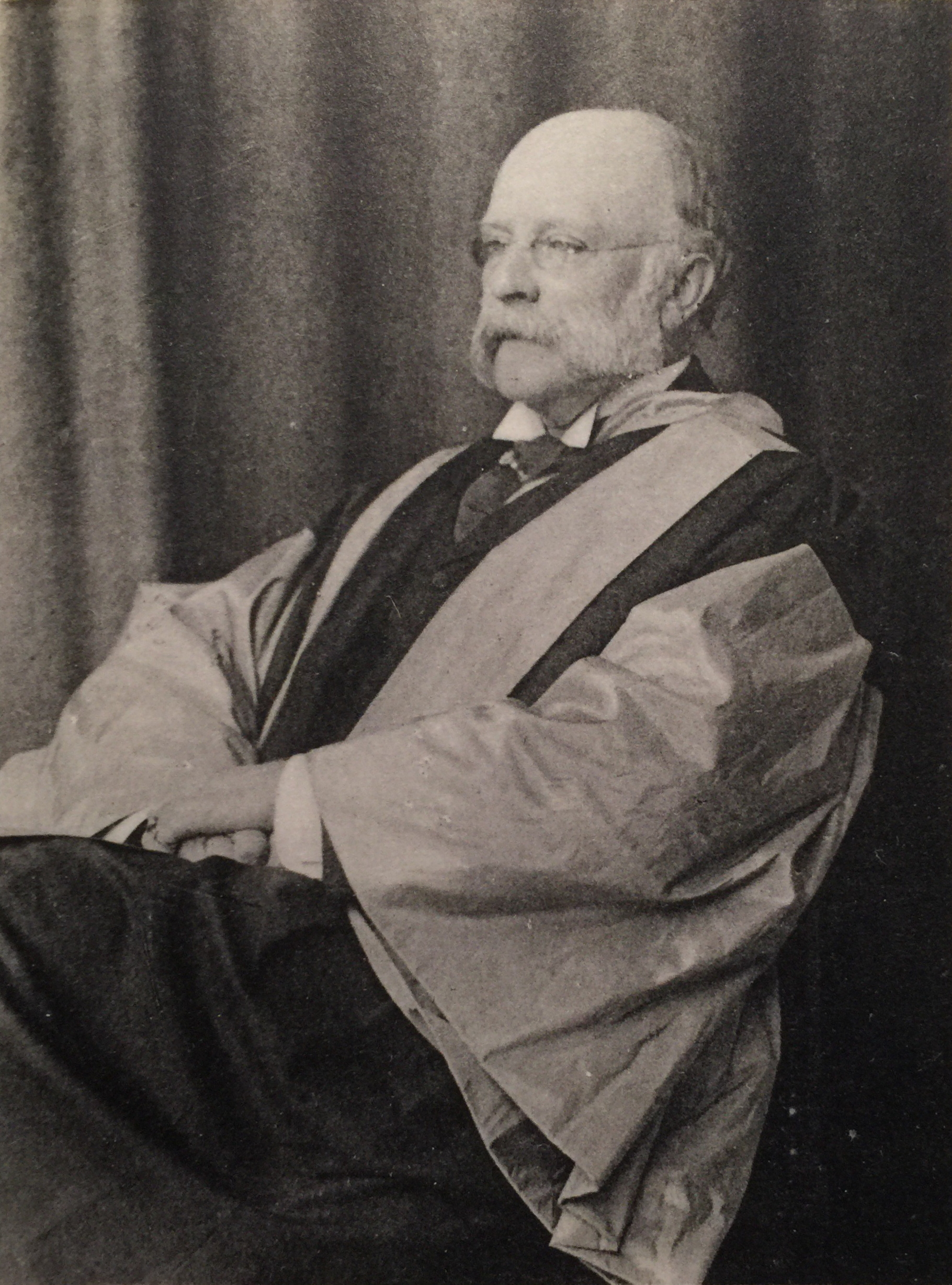
Sir Arthur Rucker as honorary doctor in Oxford, 1902

Sir Arthur William Rucker (or Rücker) FRS (23 October 1845, Clapham Park, London, England – 1 November 1915, Yattendon, Berkshire) was a British physicist.

== Education and career ==
Rucker gained his BA at Brasenose College, Oxford, in 1871, and was a Fellow there from 1871 to 1876. He was Professor of Physics, and the first Cavendish Professor at Yorkshire College, Leeds from 1874 to 1885. Rucker was then a Professor of Physics at the Royal College of Science from 1886 to 1901, when he left to become Principal of the University of London.

He received the honorary degree Doctor of Science (D.Sc.) from the University of Cambridge in May 1902, and from the University of Oxford in June 1902.

=== Royal Society ===
He was elected a Fellow of the Royal Society in 1884. He jointly gave the Royal Society's Bakerian Lecture in 1889, and was awarded the Royal Society's Royal Medal in 1891: "For his researches on liquid films, and his contributions to our knowledge of terrestrial magnetism". He served as Secretary of the Royal Society from 1896 to 1901. For his services, he was knighted in the 1902 Coronation Honours, receiving the accolade from King Edward VII at Buckingham Palace on 24 October that year.

== Lectures ==
In 1889 Rucker was invited to deliver the Royal Institution Christmas Lecture on electricity.

== Politics ==
In the general election of 1885, Rucker stood as the Liberal candidate for the newly created Leeds North constituency. He was narrowly defeated by the Conservative candidate William Jackson by 4,494 votes to 4,237. The following year, Rucker stood again in the general election of 1886 as a candidate for the Liberal Unionist Party (a breakaway wing of the Liberals that formed an electoral pact with the Conservatives). In that election, where Rucker stood in the Pudsey constituency in West Yorkshire, he lost to the Liberal candidate Briggs Priestley by 5,207 votes to 4,036.

== Family life ==
His first wife died in 1878 and he married in 1892 Thereza Story-Maskylene who was an advocate for domestic science. She was a daughter of Thereza Mary Dillwyn (born Llewelyn) and Nevil Story-Maskylene.

== Arms ==
Coat of arms of Arthur Rucker

Motto
Dum Spiro Spero

== Sources ==
- Entry for Rucker in the Royal Society's Library and Archive catalogue's details of Fellows (accessed 27 April 2008)
