= Rachel Lumsden =

British nurse and hospital manager

Rachel Frances Lumsden
- Born: 17 April 1835; Aberdeen
- Died: 22 April 1908 (aged 73); Aberdeen
- Employers: Great Ormond Street Hospital; King's College Hospital; Aberdeen Hospital for Sick Children; Aberdeen Royal Infirmary
- Known for: pioneering nursing and hospital management
- Parent(s): Jane Forbes and Clements Lumsden

Rachel Frances Lumsden (17 April 1835 – 22 April 1908) was a British nurse, and hospital manager.

== Early life and family ==
Rachel Lumsden was the fourth of seven children of Jane Forbes of Echt, Aberdeenshire, and the advocate Clements Lumsden, advocate in Aberdeen and Writer to the Signet. Her family lived at No 1 Union Terrace, Aberdeen.

== Training ==
In 1869, when her sister Louisa Lumsden enrolled at Hitchin College, Rachel went to London to train as a nurse at the Great Ormond Street Hospital. She joined later King's College Hospital, where she acquired a knowledge of hospital management such as no other person of her years had got.

== Career ==
Lumsden was invited to Aberdeen to advise on the construction of a new hospital for sick children by a group of citizens who were involved in its creation. At the completion of the new Aberdeen Hospital for Sick Children in 1877, she was appointed superintendent, leading the nursing department and administering the domestic division. Her efficient and enlightened direction highly increased the confidence of the whole community. I

In 1885, The Aberdeen Royal Infirmary was lying in a state of physical and moral decline. The building was in urgent need of renovation, the domestic services were in a state of disarray, the nursing staff had been allowed to fall away. The Board of Directors invited her to use her expertise to ameliorate that state of affairs. Despite the fact that the post of superintendent had previously always been covered by a man, she put herself forward for that position, and even on an unpaid basis. She was also in charge as a head-nurse and housekeeper and matron. Whilst in post she reorganised the nursing staff, and was also a charitable benefactor on several occasions. Rather than go in to academia, she preferred to devote all her abilities to the well-being of patients. Lumsden was one of the most industrious members of the Royal British Nurses' Association (founded in 1887 by Ethel Gordon Fenwick) and was on its executive committee as Scottish representative. Amid her reforms in administration, Lumsden introduced in 1891, a three-year formal nursing training course, having started in 1886, with a physician teaching anatomy, surgery, physiology to the nurses as well as examining practical nursing knowledge at Aberdeen (on a similar basis to that of the London Hospital), believed to be the first of its kind in Scotland. This consisted of admitting probationers for a three year term of theory and practice training, under the direction of a sister nurse.

In the same year, Queen Victoria appointed her as a member of the Council of the Scottish Board of the Queen Victoria Jubilee Institute of Nurses, a position that she held until 1897. The high degree of appreciation for her services is evident from the gracious message that Queen Victoria sent her, where it was stated that she had learned 'with interest and deep appreciation of the great and valued services' - which Miss Lumsden had given - ' with untiring zeal and self-denial to the sick and suffering of the poorer classes of Aberdeen'.

Lumsden's work was noted in America, in an article on Nursing in Scotland, for the International Congress of Charities, Correction and Philanthropy, Chicago: 'Nursing of the sick', in 1893.

== Retirement and legacy ==
A body of 63 medical practitioners connected with the Aberdeen Royal Infirmary, University of Aberdeen, Aberdeen Hospital for Sick Children presented her with an autograph album. At the head of these names was Sir James Reid, the Queen Victoria's physician. The address stated that:

Miss Rachel Frances Lumsden, on the occasion of your retirement from the office of honorary superintendent of the Aberdeen Royal Infirmary, we desire, in presenting this address to you, to give expression to our high appreciation of the great influence you have exercised on the improvement of the nursing of the sick in the city of Aberdeen and the surrounding districts, and especially of your work in the Aberdeen Hospital for Sick Children and the reforms you have effected in the Aberdeen Royal Infirmary. When your connection with these charities commenced, there existed an urgent necessity for the creation of a nursing staff with high culture and thorough technical training, such as was being introduced into similar institutions in other parts of the world. In promoting this object you have carried out the changes which were demanded in a manner that has secured our highest admiration and esteem. We appreciate the zeal, self-devotion, and generosity that have marked your connection with our public charities, and the high aims and courtesy which have characterized your work among us. The results of your efforts and example are now a blessing to many, and most of all to the sick poor. In withdrawing from the profession of nursing you leave it in a condition of excellence it never before approached in this part of Scotland. We offer your our thanks for the benefits you have thus conferred on your neighbors and fellow-citizens, and for the help which you have rendered to the profession to which we belong. The recollection of what you have achieved will long remain among us, and will always be held in grateful remembrance. Seeing that we are qualified beyond any other class of the community to estimate the value of the reforms to which you have devoted your life, we hope that this address, besides being an expression of our appreciation and regard, may be such an evidence of the success which has attended your efforts as may be of value in your eyes, and may witness to others how great has been your influence for good in the cause of nursing and hospital administration.

Unusually for a nurse, Lumsden had an obituary in the British Medical Journal stating 'Aberdeen [medical] graduates in all parts of the world will hear with sympathy and much regret' of her death and quoting the above address and also noting Queen Victoria's interest in Lumsden's work in Aberdeen.

The British Journal of Nursing counted Lumsden as one of the pioneers among nurse leaders who helped the profession to win the Royal Charter, saying 'their names and honourable labours for the organisation of their profession should be held in appreciative remembrance 4 by the younger generation, who owe them a debt of gratitude for their power of progressive thought, their sense of professional responsibility, their unselfish devotion to duty, and their courage in fighting prejudice and privilege.'

== Family ==
Lumsden's elder sister Katharina Maria Lumsden (1831-1912) succeeded her as superintendent of the Aberdeen Hospital for Sick Children. Lumsden's eldest brother Henry Lumsden, became a Colonel in the Royal Madras Artillery, and later translated epic Anglo-Saxon poem Beowulf into modern English, a scholarly publication in 1881 by Kegan Paul, her second oldest brother James, became a lawyer like his father and grandfather. Her younger sister Dame Louisa Innes Lumsden (1840-1935) became an author and the first headmistress of St Leonard's School, St. Andrews and awarded an honorary LLD from St. Andrew's University, unusual for a woman at that time.
