= Godiva Marian Thorold =

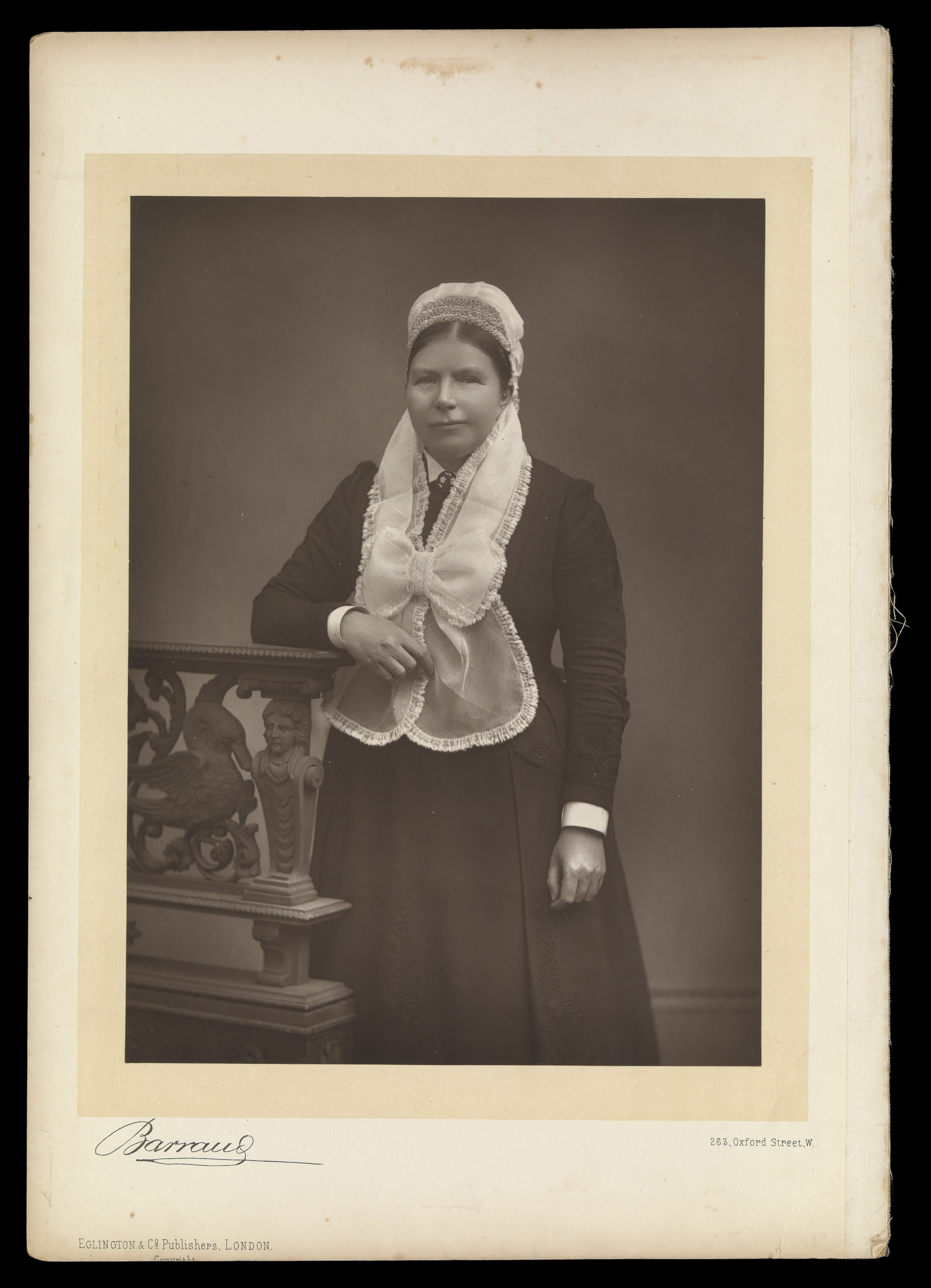
- Thorold, matron MIddlesex Hospital 1870-1905
- Born: 1840; Northam, Devon
- Died: 15 January 1918; Warkleigh House, Warkleigh, Devon
- Occupation(s): Nurse and Matron
- Years active: 1870-1905
- Employer(s): The Middlesex Hospital, London.

Godiva Marian Thorold (1840- January 15, 1918) was a British nurse, matron, and as a founding member of the British Nursing Association influential in the development of the nursing profession in the United Kingdom.

== Early life ==
Godiva Marian Thorold was born in Northam, Devon in 1840, the eldest of eight children to Fannie Elizabeth Thorold and Reverend William Thorold, grandson of Sir John Thorold, 9th Baronet.

== Career ==
Thorold commenced nurse training as a lady probationer in 1866 at University College Hospital. She was asked to take up the position of Lady Superintendent (another term for matron) of the Middlesex Hospital by the Chairman of the Board in 1870, having previously substituted for the previous superintendent Miss Martyr. Thorold remained as Lady Superintendent until 1905 and was acknowledged as having built a nursing department, including nurse training, that was nationally recognized as good and historically important. Innovations that Thorold suggested to the governors of the hospital and were introduced were: the admittance of lady probationers and probationers for nurse training, the introduction of lectures for probationers, the certification of probationers on completion of training (three years for probationers and one year for lady probationers ), on-site accommodation (i.e. a Nurses' Home), a pension scheme for nurses and the creation of a Trained Nursing Institute, which provided nurses for private clients and a source of income for the hospital. Thorold was noted as a matron who spoke to every patient and nurse on her morning and evening rounds of all wards, attended the doctors' on their ward rounds (unusual at this time) and was present in the operating theatre. On Thorold's retirement, she was presented with a canteen of silverware by the hospital governors.

== Royal British Nurses' Association ==
Thorold was a founding and leading member, with Ethel Fenwick and Isla Stewart of the (later Royal) British Nurses' Association. The Association was established to promote the standardised training and certification of nurses as well as create a pension and welfare fund. HRH Princess Christian was the President and Thorold was a nurse vice president, and consequently signatory of the Royal Charter granted to the Association in 1892. Thorold later resigned over the controversy about the support for state registration of nursing, which the Middlesex Hospital Board of Governors and doctors did not support at the time.

== Death ==
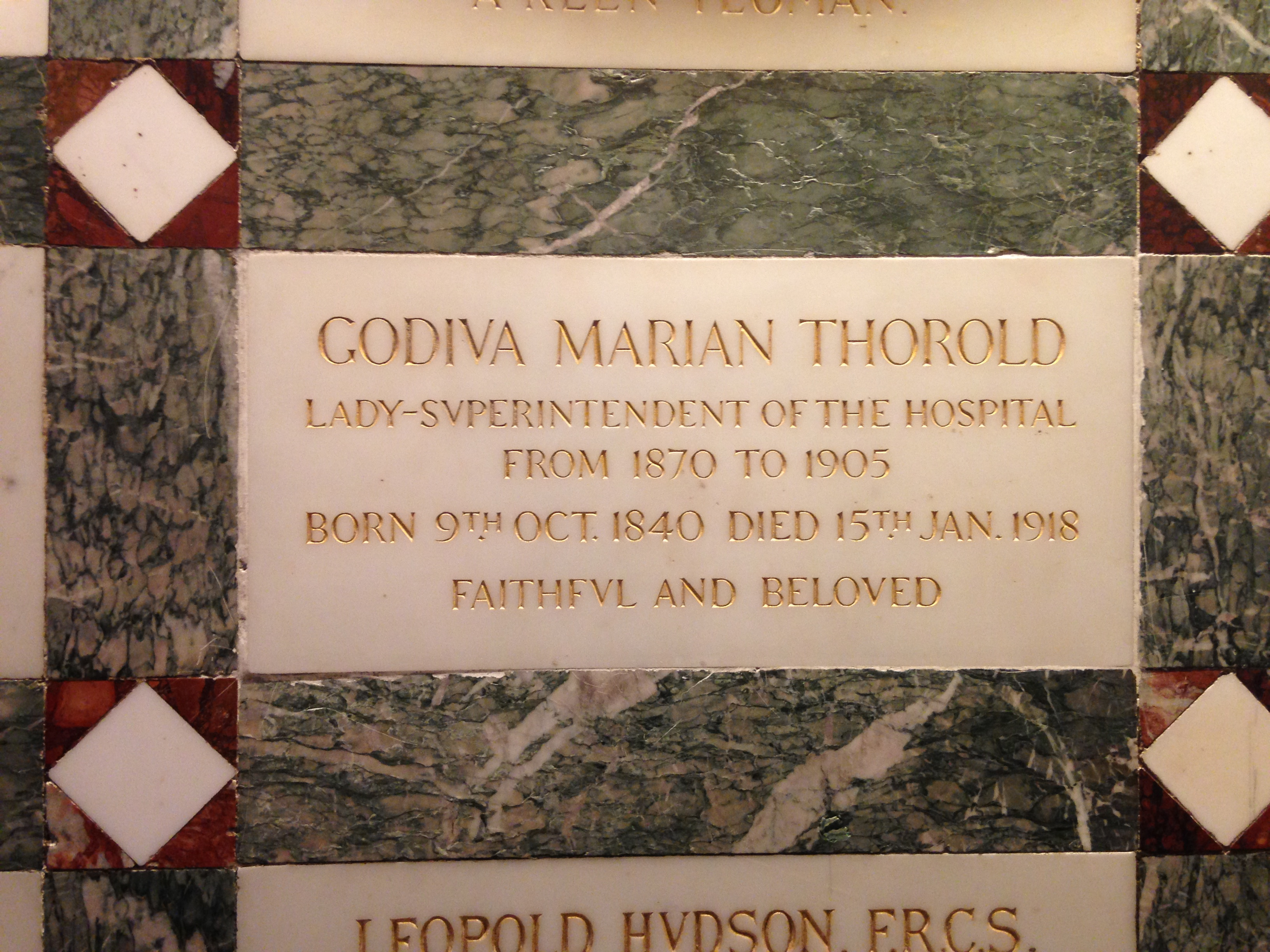
Memorial stone, Miss G M Thorold

Thorold died at her family home of Warkleigh House, Devon on 15 January 1918. A memorial service was held in the chapel of the Middlesex Hospital, where a memorial stone was later laid.
