= Thereza Rucker =

British promoter of household science teaching

Thereza, Lady Rucker
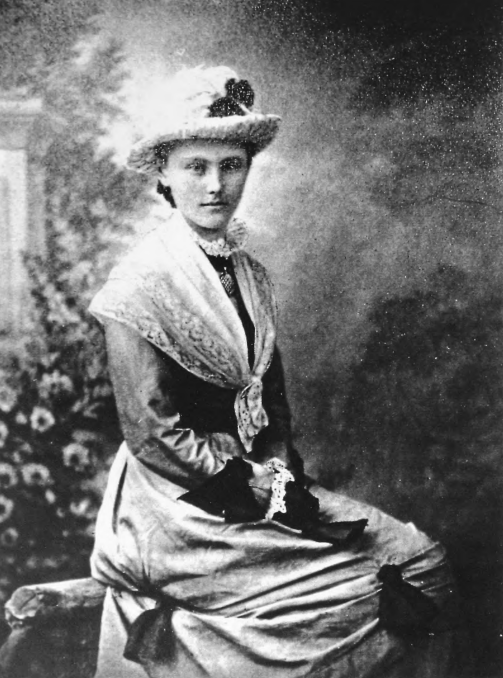
- Born: Thereza Charlotte Story-Maskelyne; 3 June 1863; London, England
- Died: 20 December 1941 (aged 78); Yattendon, England
- Education: Bedford College, London
- Known for: British promoter of household science teaching
- Spouse: Sir Arthur William Rücker
- Parent(s): Nevil Story Maskelyne; Thereza Dillwyn Llewelyn

Thereza Charlotte, Lady Rucker (born Thereza Charlotte Story-Maskelyne; 3 June 1863 – 20 December 1941) was a British promoter of household science teaching. She helped establish Domestic Science as a university subject but only at one university.

== Life ==
Rucker was born in 1863 in London to a landed gentry family. Her father, Nevil Story Maskelyne, was a politician and a professor of mineralogy at Oxford and her mother, Thereza Dillwyn Llewelyn of Penllergare House, was a leading scientist studying astronomy and photography. Rucker was the granddaughter of the Welsh botanist and photographer John Dillwyn Llewelyn and a great-granddaughter of Nevil Maskelyne, who served as Astronomer Royal.

Her education was important. She took correspondence courses with the universities of Oxford and Edinburgh. She had lessons at home and she studied at Bedford College, London.

She married on 7 September 1892, becoming the second wife of Arthur William Rücker who was the Principal of the University of London. They had one son, Arthur Nevil Rucker. She was involved with the Association of Teachers of Domestic Science, becoming their president in 1908. She wrote to the Pall Mall Gazette noting that the only way to create some status for their subject was to give it university status.

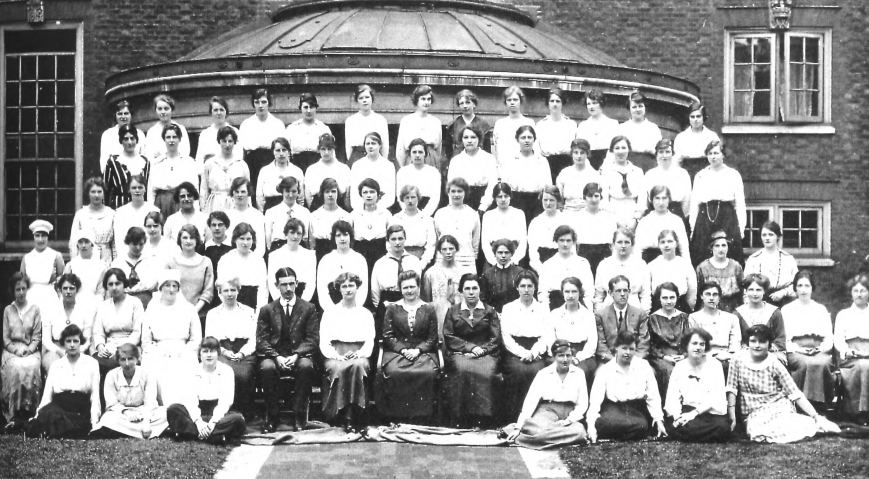
King's College of Household and Social Science Degree Students in 1920

In 1908, hygiene lecturer Alice Ravenhill, Hilda D. Oakeley and Rucker created a home science course at King's College, London in the Women's Department. Ravenhill had already developed the idea in 1901–1905. Rucker's husband had retired in 1908 and he assisted her in this work. By 1920 it was a subject for a degree and in 1928 the King's College of Household and Social Science was formed to further their initial idea.

In the end the experiment failed and KCHSS was the only university to establish domestic science as a university subject. Other disciplines like social science and the idea that good household management could control disease was replaced by the expertise of other disciplines including public health.

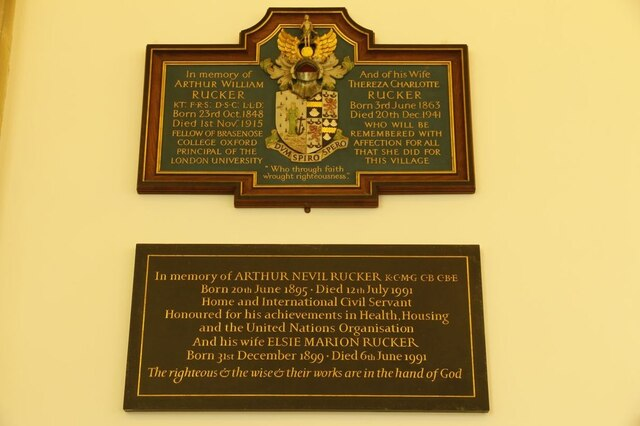
Her family's memorial in Yattendon

Rucker died at her home in Yattendon in 1941. There is a memorial to her and her husband in the church in Yattendon.
