= Hilda D. Oakeley =

British philosopher, educationalist and author (1867-1950)

Hilda Oakeley
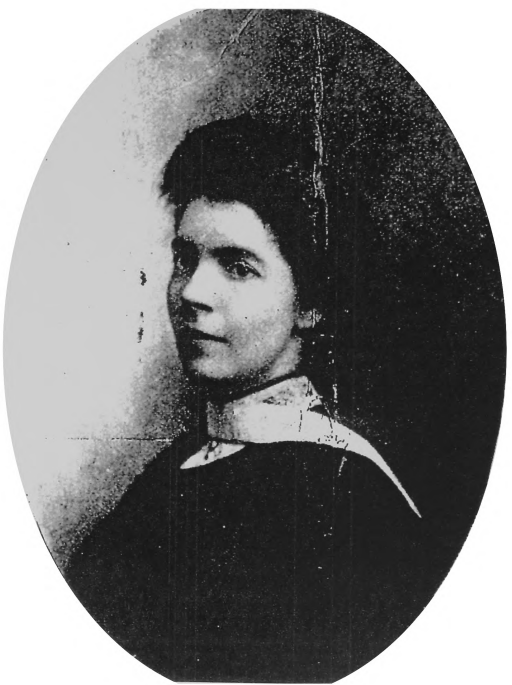
- Born: 12 October 1867; Durham, UK
- Died: 7 October 1950 (aged 82); London

Hilda Diana Oakeley (12 October 1867 – 7 October 1950) was a British philosopher, educationalist and author.

== Life and career ==
Hilda Oakeley was born in 1867 in Durham, UK. She was from a privileged upper-middle-class background. Her father, Sir Evelyn Oakeley was a member of a Shropshire gentry family. He and his wife Caroline (née Turner) had five children. In 1878 her father was promoted and the family moved to Manchester. Hilda attended the private Ellerslie Ladies' College. After finishing school she moved to London and independently studied philosophy and psychology. She attended some of the lectures of the philosopher Bernard Bosanquet and after winning a prize for an essay on Aristotle, the examiners persuaded her to apply to go to Oxford University.

In 1894 at the comparatively late age of 27, Hilda Oakeley went to Somerville College, Oxford to read Greats. She received a first class degree in 1898, although it was not until 1920 when women were admitted as full members of Oxford University, that she was awarded it. After leaving Oxford, she became the first Warden of the new Royal Victoria College at McGill University, Canada. This was a Canada's first residential college for women. She taught philosophy in the faculty of arts and in 1900 she was the first woman to deliver McGill's annual university lecture on 'History and progress'.

In 1905 Oakeley returned to England and was appointed lecturer in philosophy to women students at Manchester University. Two years later she moved back to London, where her parents lived and took a post as Warden of King's College for Women, University of London, and as lecturer in philosophy.

In 1908 hygiene lecturer Oakeley, Alice Ravenhill and Thereza Rucker created a home science course at King's College, London in the Women's Department and it would go on to be a degree subject.

In 1915, the college turned coeducational and the women's department closed, she retained a part-time lecturership in philosophy at King's. In 1921 she returned to King's as a university reader in philosophy. In 1928 she was awarded the London degree of DLitt. She was subsequently Acting Head of the philosophy department there from 1925 to 1930 and head of the department in 1931. She retired in 1931.

Oakeley wrote more than forty articles in philosophical journals on a wide variety of topics including time, history, ethics, political philosophy, and idealism. She published six books of philosophy. She also published her memoirs, My Adventures in Education (1939); and a volume of poetry, A Philosopher's Rhyme and other Stray Verses (1937).

She was president of the Aristotelian Society for 1940–1941 and was vice-president of the British Federation of University Women from 1909 until her death. She died in London on 7 October 1950.

== Publications ==
Books

- History and Progress, and other Essays and Addresses (1923)
- Greek Ethical Thought (1925)
- A Study in the Philosophy of Personality (1928)
- History and the Self (1934)
- A Philosopher's Rhyme and other Stray Verses (1937)
- The False State (1937)
- My Adventures in Education (1939)
- Should Nations Survive? (1942)

Selected journal articles

- A Study in the Philosophy of Personality. Journal of Philosophical Studies 5 (1930) :296-297.
- Time and the self in Mctaggart's system. Mind 39 (154) 1930:175-193.
- How Is History Possible? The Presidential Address. Proceedings of the Aristotelian Society 41 (1940):i-xviii.
- Mind in Nature. Philosophy 20 (75) 1945:31 - 38.
