= Church of St Margaret of Antioch, Northam =

Church in Devon, England

Coordinates: 51°02′25″N 4°12′51″W

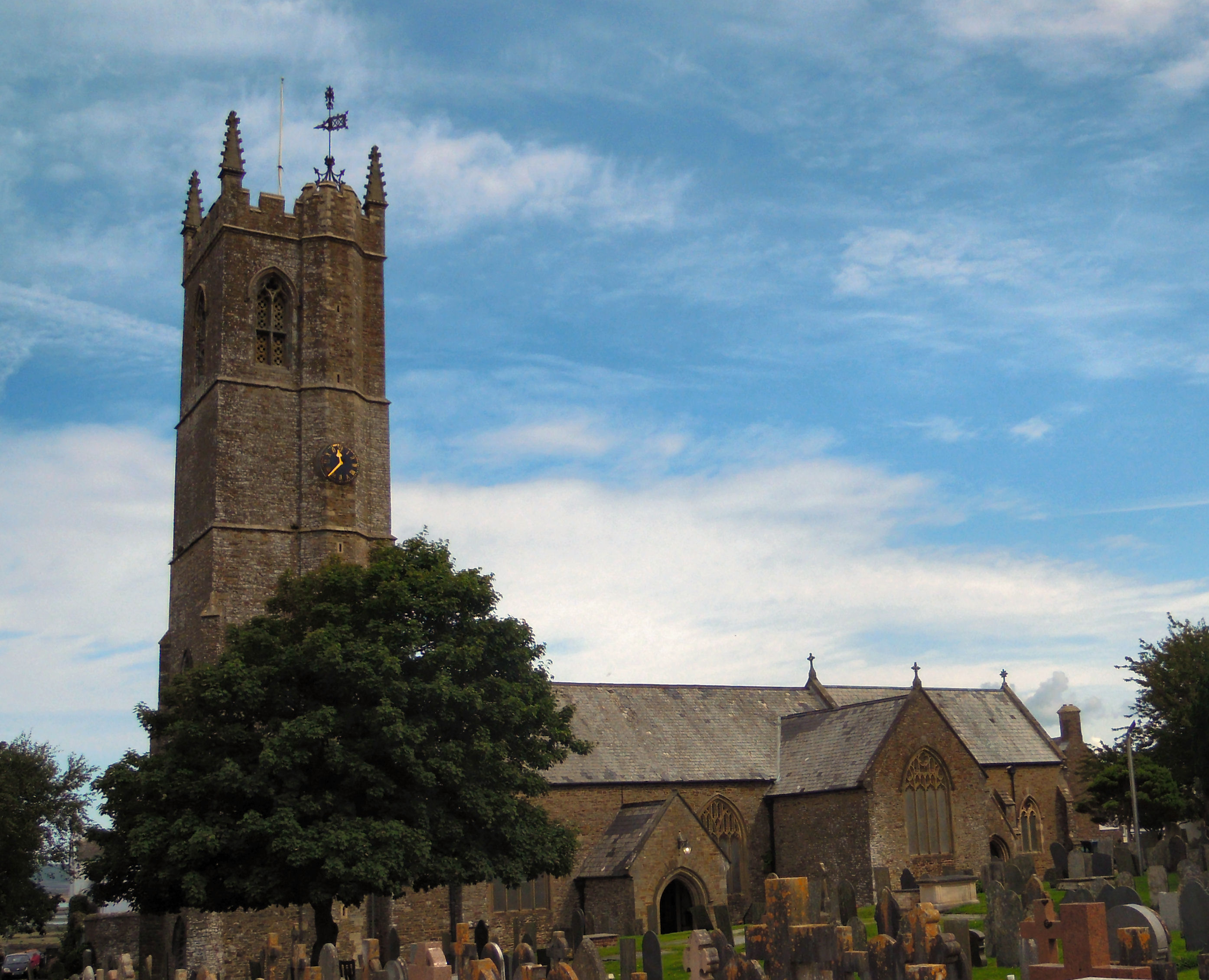
The Church of St Margaret of Antioch in Northam, Devon

The Church of St Margaret of Antioch is the Anglican parish church for Northam near Bideford in Devon, England. Dedicated to Saint Margaret, the church has been a Grade I listed building since 1951 and comes under the Diocese of Exeter.

== History and design ==
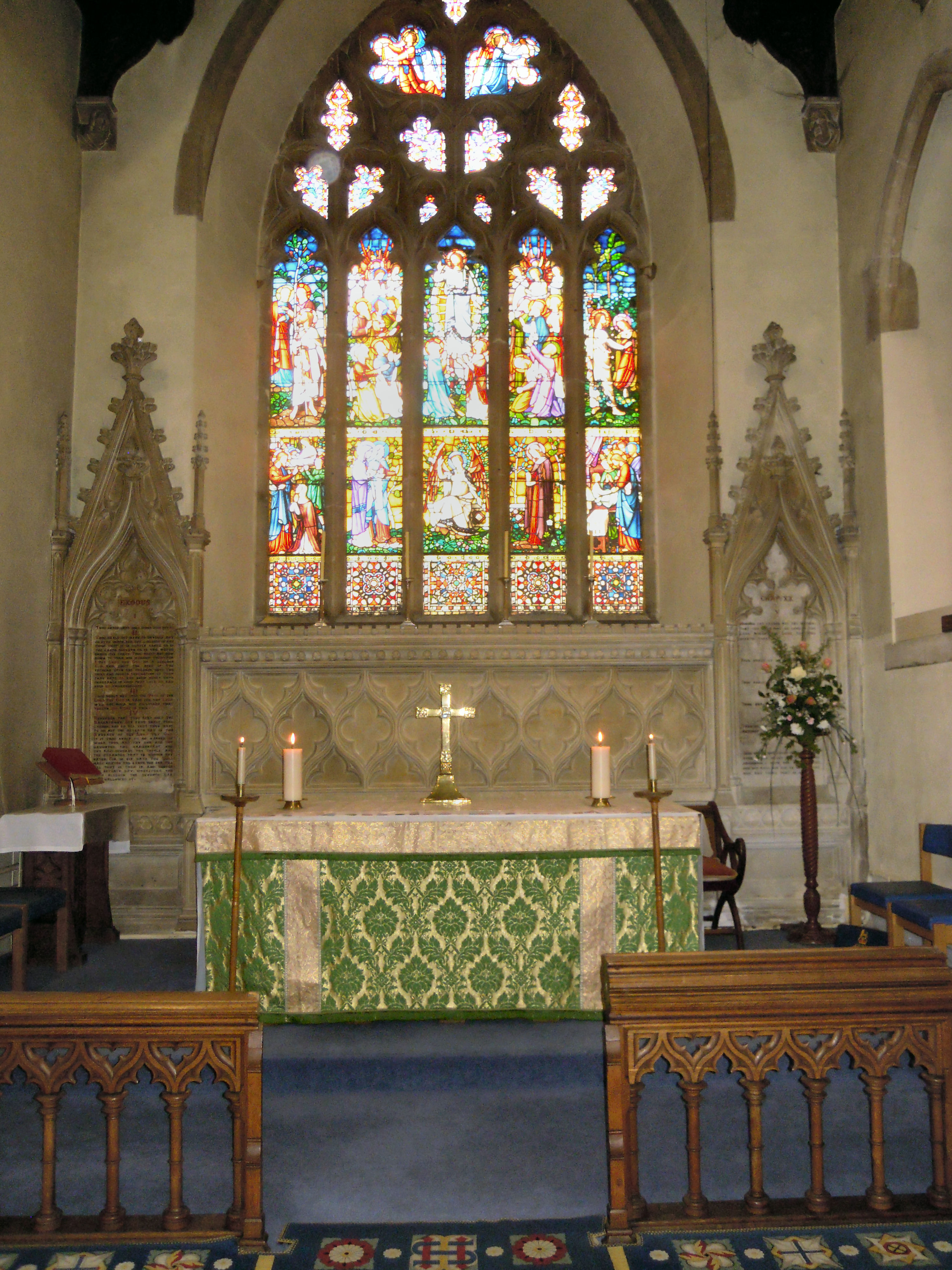
The Sanctuary with the altar

An older Norman church once stood on the site, but the present church is mainly 15th-century while the lower part of the tower is older. The building was comprehensively restored between 1845 and 1870 by public subscription and at the expense of the Rev I.H. Gosset under the direction of architect Daniel Mackintosh of Exeter in the early Perpendicular style and commands an excellent position overlooking the sea with views of Lundy Island in the distance. The 170 feet high tower houses eight bells and is early 15th-century. Because of its prominent position overlooking Bideford Bay it was used for centuries as a guide for shipping in the Bristol Channel with its seaward side being whitewashed for greater visibility. The nave is 13th or 14th-century in date; the church was enlarged with a north aisle as the local population grew during the Elizabethan era as witnessed by the inscription "This yele was made Anno 1593" ('yele' meaning 'aisle') on one of the arches.

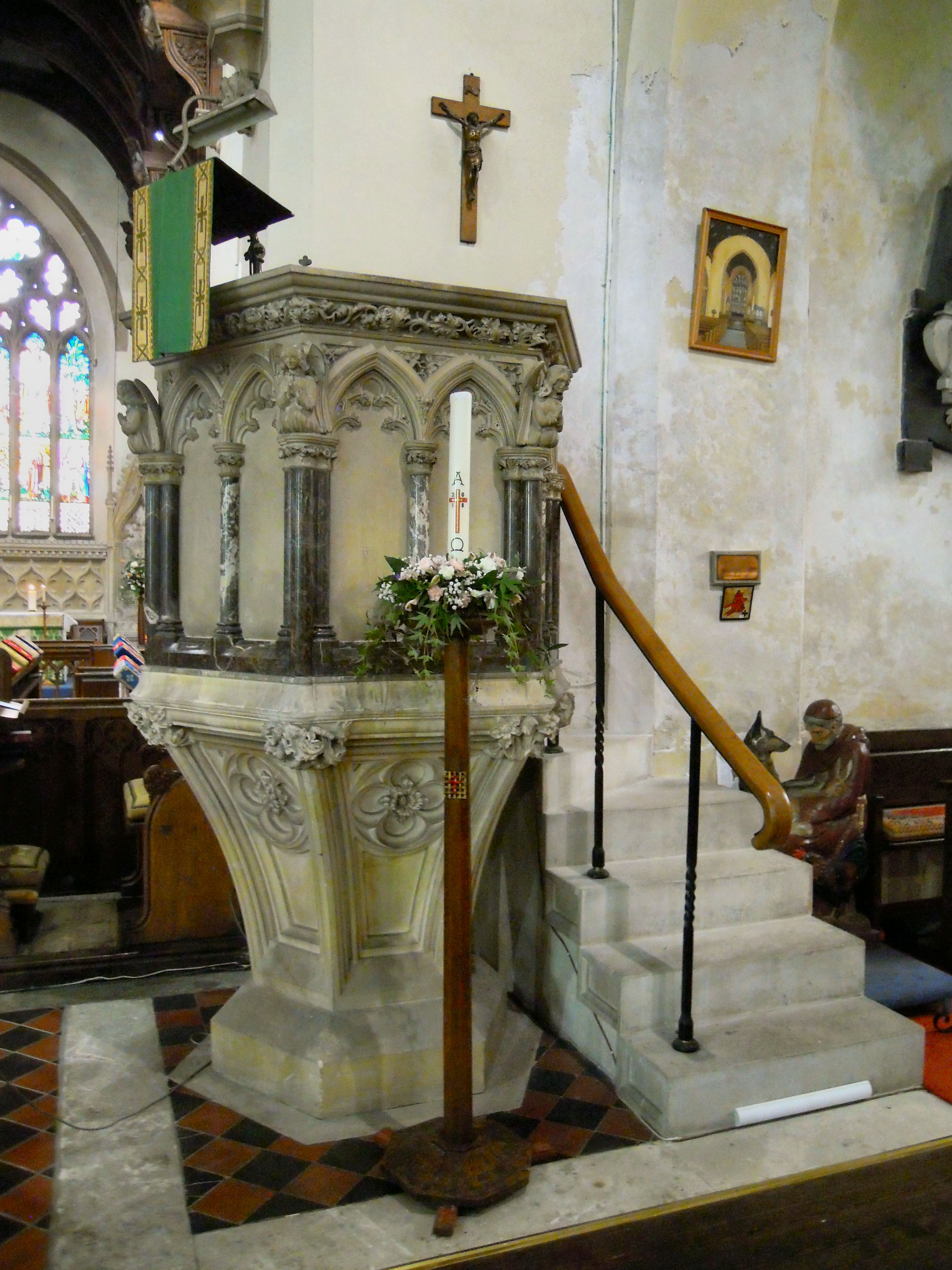
The pulpit

The Elizabethan barrel vault ceiling is particularly fine and is thought to have been built by local shipwrights who incorporated bosses carved with the Tudor rose, various plant forms and Saint George's Cross together with the symbols of the Passion of Jesus. The Chapel of Saint George is believed to have been the guild chapel of the Guild of Saints John and George which existed to help the poor in the Middle Ages.

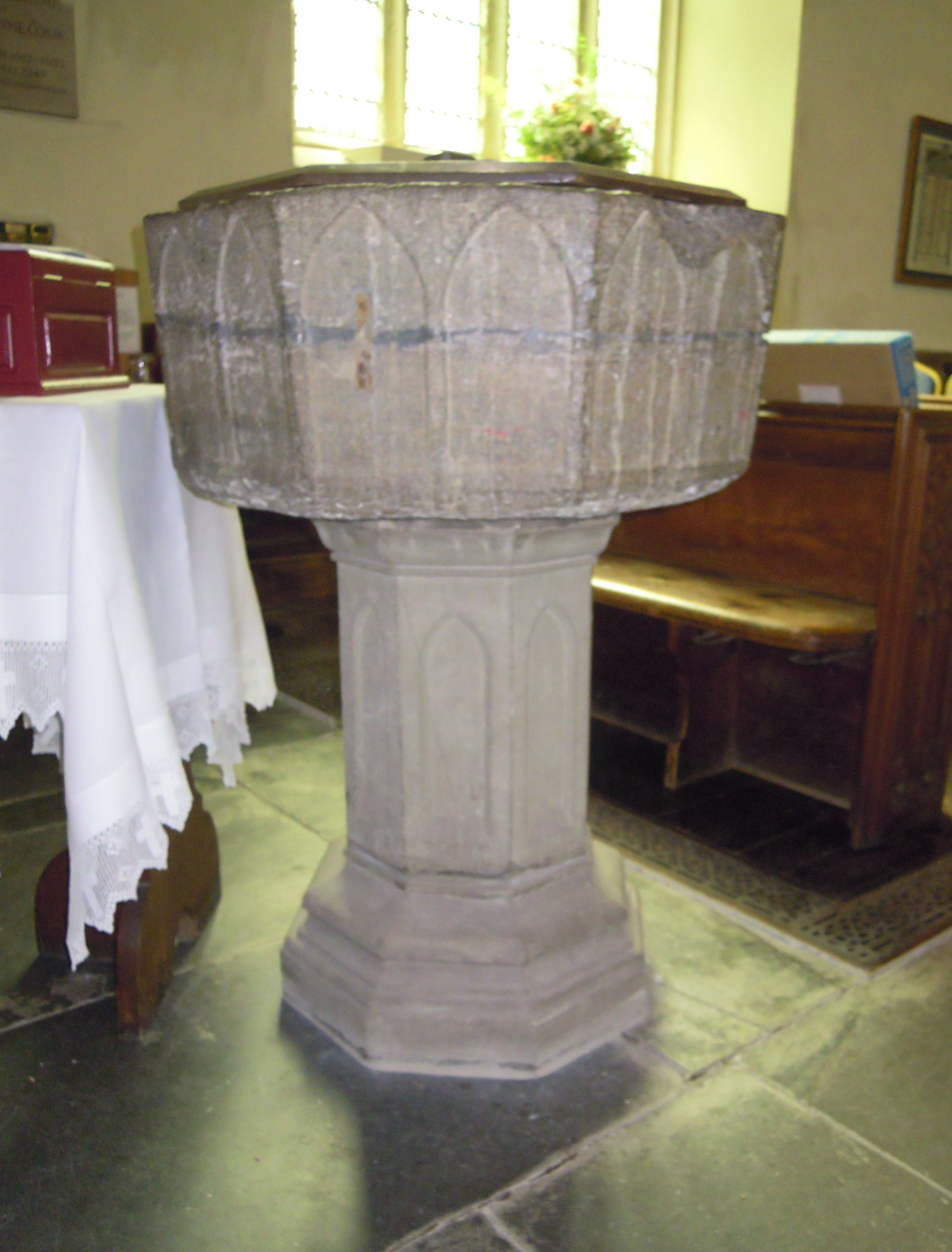
The baptismal font

The baptismal font was rediscovered buried under the floor of the tower during the Victorian era and is interesting for its crack and the places on the lip where the locks were positioned to prevent the theft of Holy Water. It was restored in 1848 at the instigation of the Reverend Isaac Henry Gosset who wrote of a local tradition that the font had been broken in two with a sledgehammer by Parliamentary troops during the Civil War. Beside the font can be found a coloured statue of Francis of Assisi with the Wolf of Gubbio which is a copy of an original from 1927 by Mother Maribel (1887-1970), an Anglican nun and artist at the Convent at Wantage. Beside this statue is a copy of and translation of the 14th-century Northam Kyrie, a page from a medieval hymn book that would have been in use in the church. The music is written in plainsong and the words are asking 'Lord have mercy upon us.' The Northam Kyrie was discovered in 1933 set into the backing of a churchwarden's book dating from the Elizabethan era. The original is held in the Devon Heritage Centre in Exeter.

The pulpit is of Devon marble and replaces a Georgian three decker pulpit. The Lady Chapel dates to 1623 and houses the organ built by J. W. Walker & Sons Ltd in 1866 while the altar serves as a memorial to those who died in World War I; set in the top of the altar is a marble slab with consecration crosses. A more recent addition to the chapel is the statue of the Suffering Madonna and Christ Child carved by Eric Collingwood, a member of the congregation.

== Churchyard ==
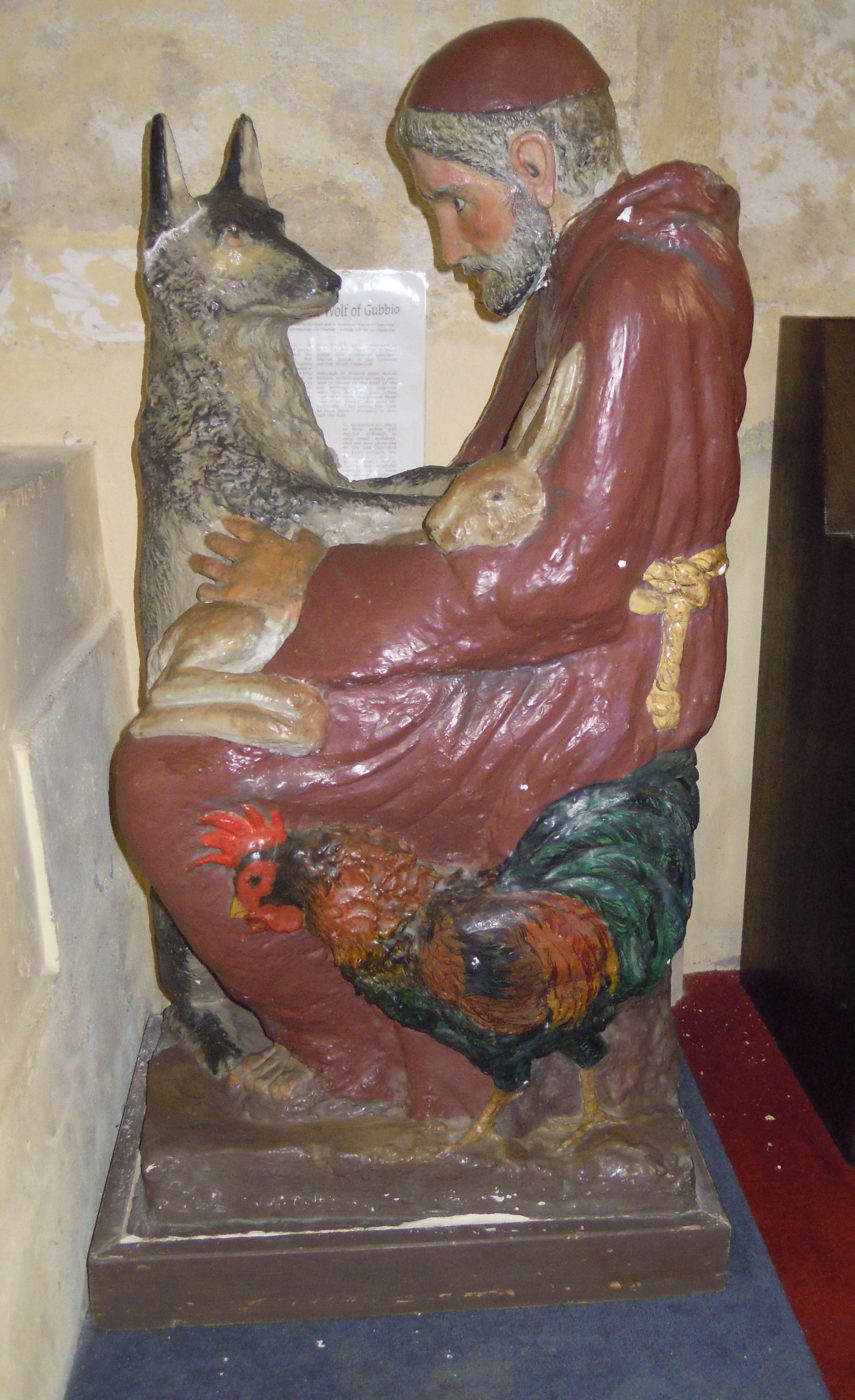
Statue of Francis of Assisi with the Wolf of Gubbio

The churchyard is in two sections: the older and original section lying around the church itself and containing many old graves while the newer section is reached through a gate at the top of the old churchyard. In the old section is a grave supposed to be of Salvation Yeo, a character in Charles Kingsley's Westward Ho! who is tortured by the Inquisition. Another is of Benjamin Rogers, a soldier of the Napoleonic Wars who fought against Napoleon in several battles and then guarded him as a prisoner on Saint Helena before returning to Northam where he died aged 90. Also here are various sailors' graves and the Mortuary Chapel now used as a church meeting room.

The musician and conductor Clarence Raybould is buried in the older churchyard, while buried in the new churchyard are a number of Anglican nuns in shared plots and several graves maintained by the Commonwealth War Graves Commission including one to an unknown merchant seaman "Known unto God" whose body was washed up in the area during World War II.
