= Richmond Road Halt railway station =

Former railway station in Devon, England

Richmond Road Halt
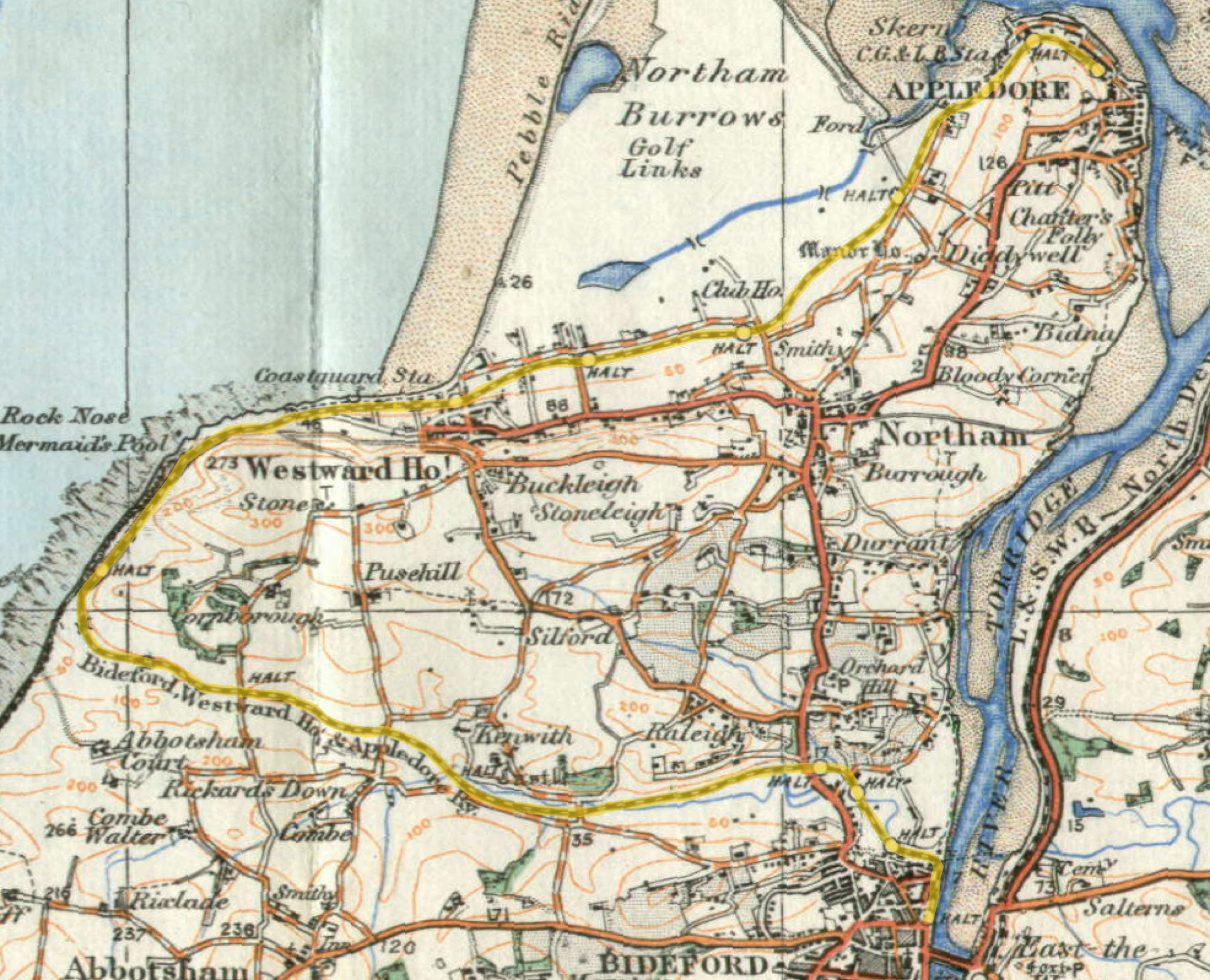
- Map showing the site of the halt.

General information
- Location: Appledore, Torridge; England
- Coordinates: 51.0498°N 4.2077°W
- Grid reference: SS453301
- Platforms: 1

Other information
- Status: Disused

History
- Original company: Bideford, Westward Ho! and Appledore Railway
- Pre-grouping: British Electric Traction

Key dates
- 1 May 1908: Opened
- 28 March 1917: Closed
Location

Richmond Road Halt was a minor railway station or halt in north Devon, situated fairly close to the town of Appledore, a community lying on the peninsula formed by the sea (Bideford Bay), the River Torridge, and the River Taw.

== History ==
The halt was opened in 1908 and the next stop on the line was Lovers' Lane Halt, followed by the terminus at Appledore, some 7½ miles from Bideford. This line had until 1901 run only as far as Northam.

=== Infrastructure ===
Richmond Road Halt had a simple single platform, raised one foot (30 cm) above rail level, with a shelter, without lighting and with a level crossing without gates. It had no freight facilities. It was situated on the left just before the crossroads with Broad Lane and the Burrows Road that used to be called Richmond Road.

== Micro history ==
The trackbed from Appledore to Richmond Road Halt and beyond was converted into a road and the station buildings were demolished.

== See also ==
- Northam station
- Westward Ho! station

Preceding station	Disused railways	Following station
Lovers' Lane Halt; Line and station closed	Bideford, Westward Ho! and Appledore Railway	Northam; Line and station closed
