= Herbert J. Paterson =

British surgeon (1867–1940)

Herbert John Paterson CBE FRCS (10 March 1867 – 21 May 1940) was a British surgeon and gastroenterologist.

== Early life ==
He was born on 10 March 1867 at 308 Renfrew Street in Glasgow, the son of the Rev Dr Hugh Sinclair Paterson (or Patterson). His father was trained as a medical missionary for the Free Church of Scotland, but at that time was minister of St Mark's Free Church on Argyle Street. His mother, Hugh's second wife, was Catherine Maria (née Anderson). In 1872, the family moved to London when his father obtained a post as minister of the Belgrave Church. They moved to 20 Bassett Road in Notting Hill, a large three-storey and basement townhouse, in 1879.

== Education and career ==
He was educated at Trinity College, Cambridge, graduating Doctor of Medicine (MD). He later became senior surgeon at the National Temperance Hospital, honorary surgeon to the King Edward VII Hospital for Officers and Hunterian Professor of Surgery at the Royal College of Surgeons of England.

During the First World War, he was honorary surgeon-in-charge of the Queen Alexandra's Hospital for Officers in Highgate, for which he was appointed Commander of the Order of the British Empire (CBE) in January 1920. He was a champion of nurses and served as medical honorary secretary of the Royal British Nurses' Association.

== Personal life ==
In 1901, Paterson married Tempé Langrish Faber, daughter of the politician George Henry Faber. They had no children and his will therefore left a large sum to Trinity College, Cambridge, which was used to fund the Paterson Medal for promising medical students.

He died on 21 May 1940 in Glasgow.

== Publications ==
- Gastric surgery: being the Hunterian Lectures delivered before the Royal College of Surgeons of England on February 19th, 21st and 23rd, 1906.
- The surgery of the stomach: a handbook of diagnosis and treatment (2nd ed.). 1914.
- Indigestion (1929)
- A Surgeon Looks Back (1941 -posthumous autobiography)
