= St Mary's Church, Appledore =

Coordinates: 51.055°N 4.193°W

Church of Saint Mary
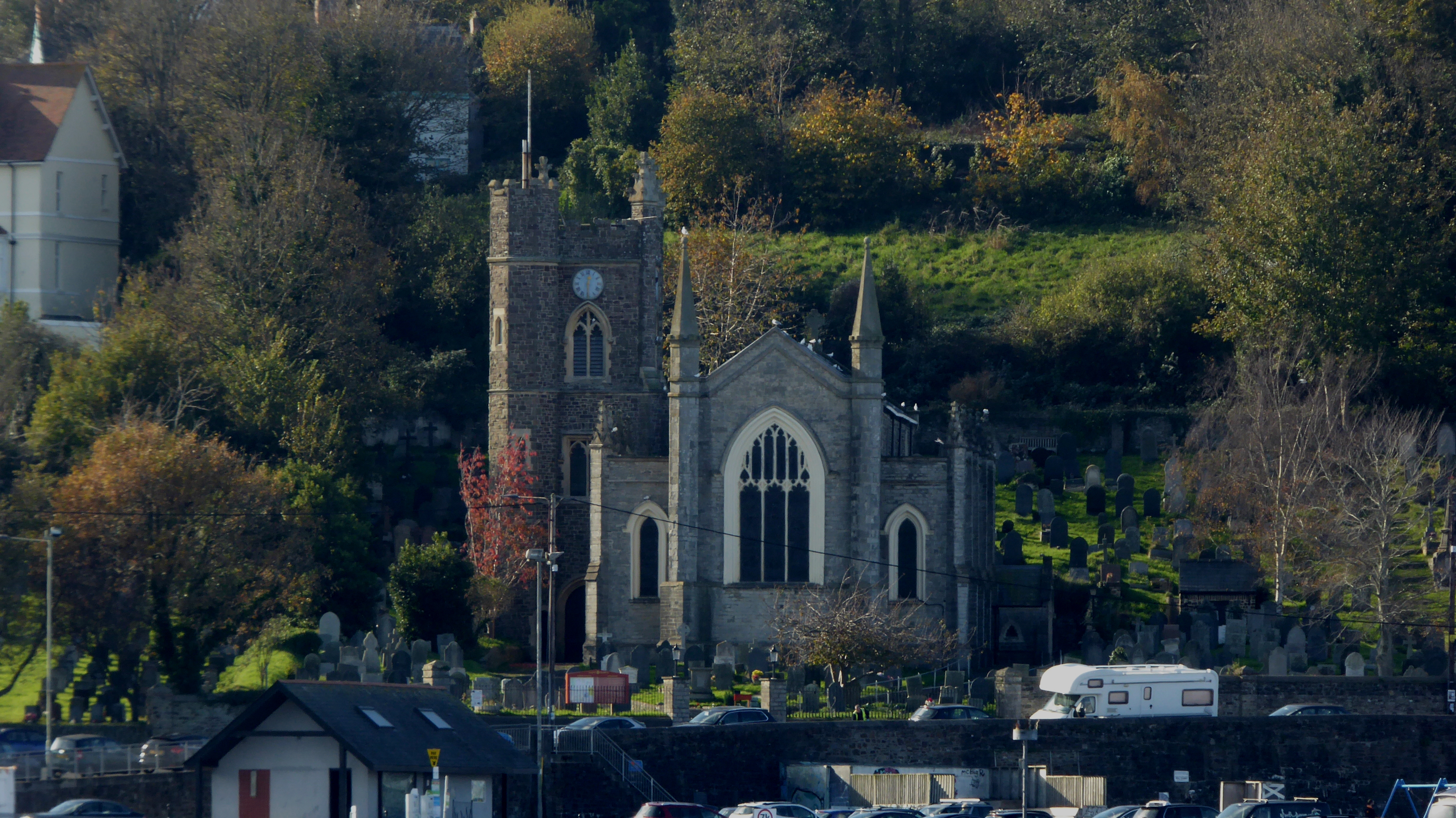
- Church of Saint Mary
- Denomination: Church of England
- Website: www.appledorestmarys.com

History
- Dedication: Saint Mary

Administration
- Province: Canterbury
- Diocese: Exeter
- Archdeaconry: Barnstaple
- Deanery: Hartland
- Parish: Appledore

Clergy
- Vicar(s): Revd Jules Harris; Team Rector

St Mary's Church is the parish church of Appledore. It sits on the Quay overlooking the River Torridge. The foundation stone of the church was laid in 1836, the church being dedicated two years later. The sailing ship Marco Polo was used to create the wooden screen. The creation of a church in Appledore is believed to be due to Protestant dissenters being ejected from nearby Northam Parish Church in 1662 and opening their own chapel in 1699.

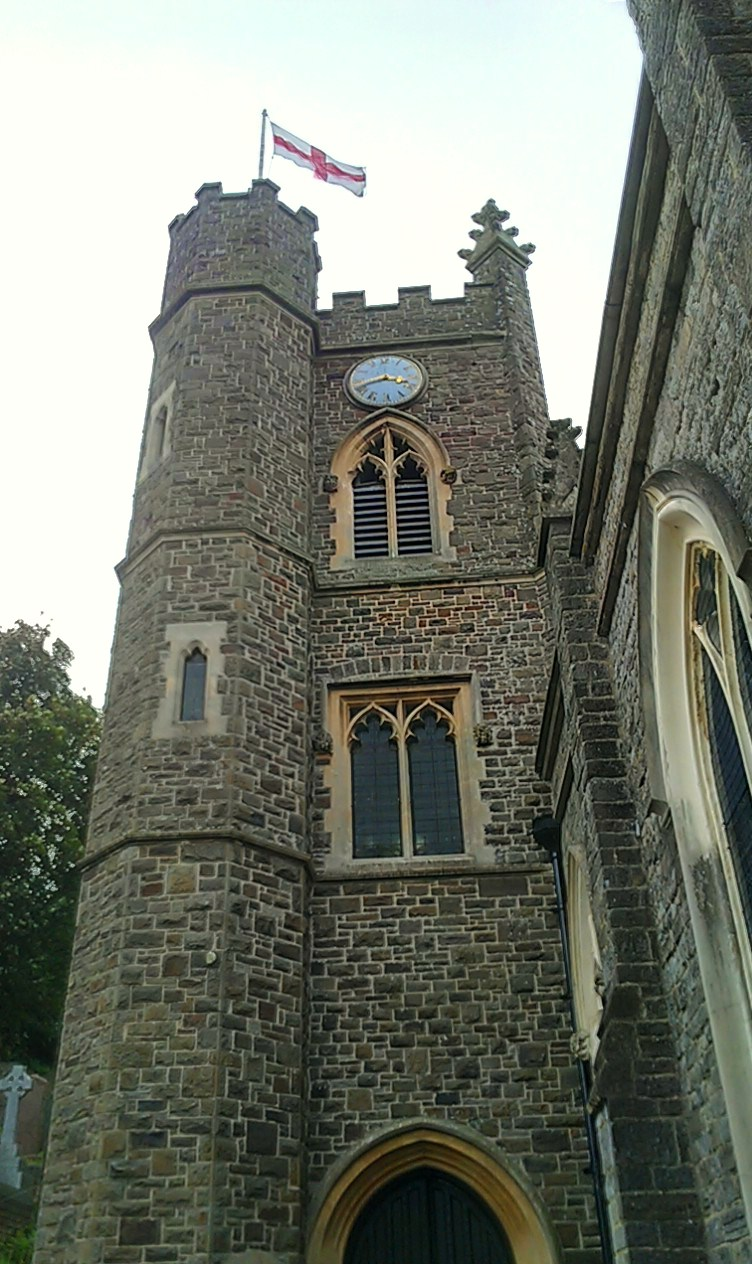
Tower at the church
