= Northam, Devon =

Town in Devon, England

Coordinates: 51.0393°N 4.2104°W

Northam
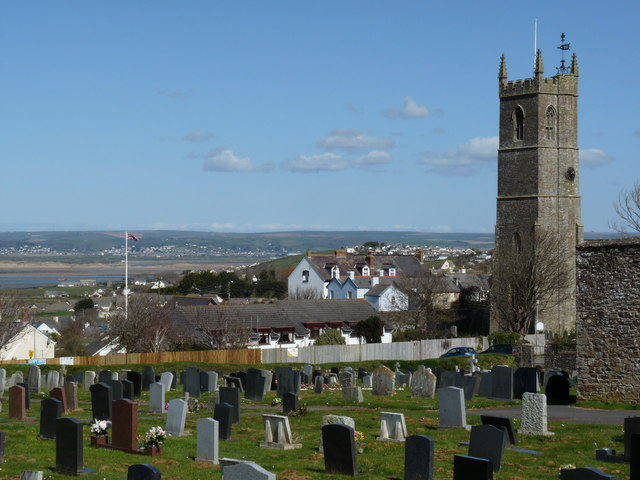
- Northam Church

- Location within Devon
- Population: 12,356 (Parish, 2021); 5,190 (Built up area, 2021)
- OS grid reference: SS450290
- District: Torridge
- Shire county: Devon
- Region: South West
- Country: England
- Sovereign state: United Kingdom
- Post town: Bideford
- Postcode district: EX39
- Dialling code: 01237
- Police: Devon and Cornwall
- Fire: Devon and Somerset
- Ambulance: South Western
- UK Parliament: Torridge and Tavistock

Northam (/ˈnɔːrðəm/ NOR-dhəm) is a market town, civil parish and electoral ward in Devon, England, lying north of Bideford. The civil parish also includes the villages of Westward Ho!, Appledore, West Appledore, Diddywell, Buckleigh and Silford, and the residential areas of Orchard Hill and Raleigh Estate.

== History ==
The name Northam derives from the Old English norðhām meaning 'north village'.

Northam is thought to have been the site of an Anglo-Saxon earthwork fortification, and an area between Northam and Appledore is conjectured to have been where the Danish Viking Ubba (or Hubba) was repelled during the reign of Alfred the Great. This is commemorated in local place names like Bloody Corner and Hubba's Rock (or Hubbleston), which is supposed to be the site where Ubba was killed. It was also the site of the Battle of Northam in 1069 where the sons of Harold Godwinson were defeated. St Margaret's church is the Anglican parish church for the town and has been a Grade I listed building since 1951.

In 1832 a meeting was held in Northam to protest an attempt by Augustus Saltren-Willett, lord of the manor, to take ownership of the commons of Northam Burrows.

Royal North Devon Golf Club was formed at Northam Burrows in 1864; its course is the oldest on its original site in England.

Between 1901 and 1917, the town and golf course were served by Northam railway station.

== Governance ==
There are three tiers of local government covering Northam, at parish (town), district and county level: Northam Town Council, Torridge District Council (based in nearby Bideford) and Devon County Council (based in Exeter). The town council is based at the Town Hall at 1 Windmill Lane.

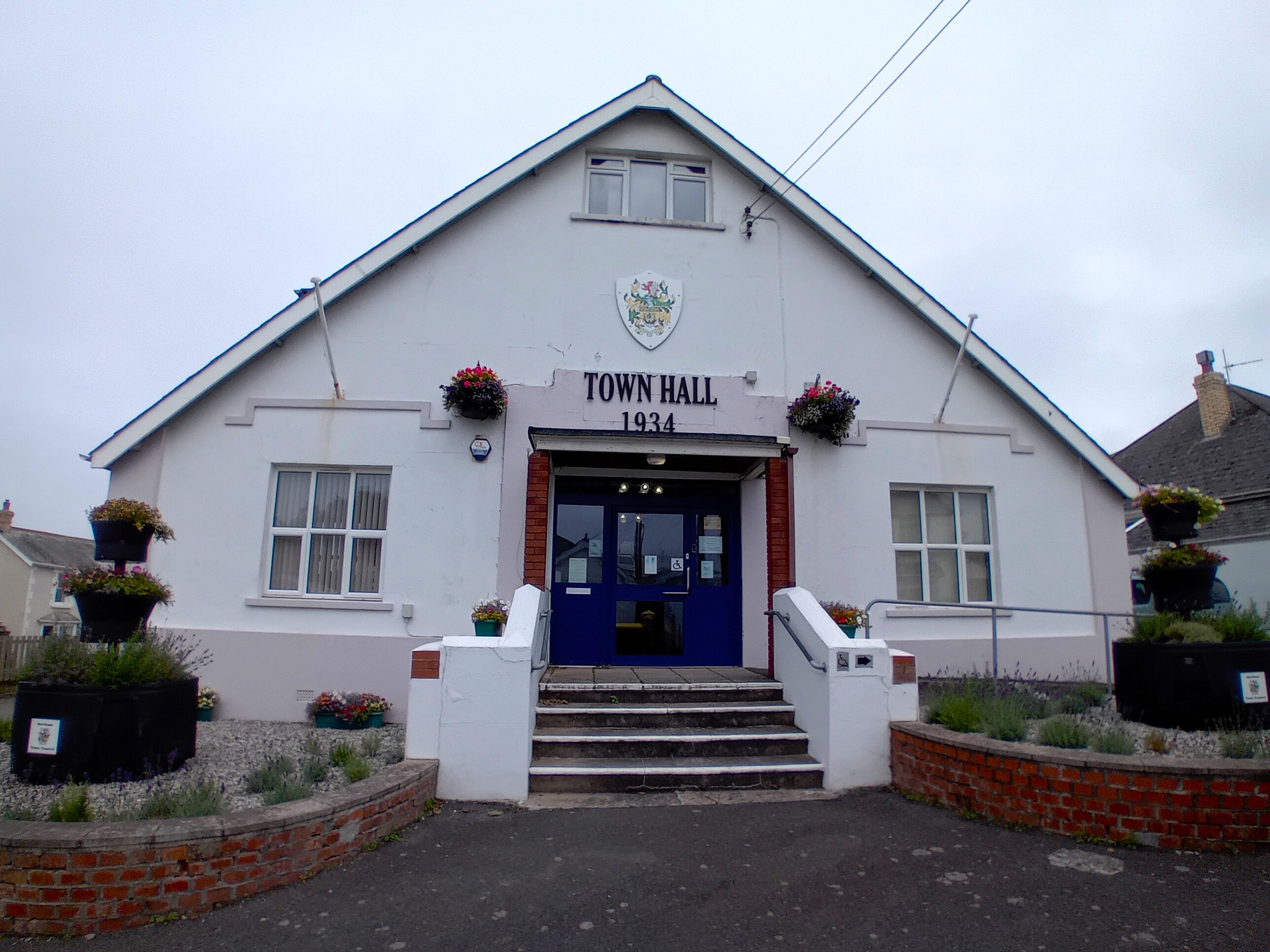
Town Hall, 1 Windmill Lane

Northam was an ancient parish. Until 1867 the parish was governed by its vestry in the same way as most rural areas. In 1867 a local board was established for the parish. Local boards were converted into urban district councils in 1894. Northam Urban District Council built itself a headquarters on Windmill Lane in 1934, initially called the Council Offices.

Northam Urban District was abolished in 1974 under the Local Government Act 1972, with the area becoming part of the new district of Torridge. A successor parish was created covering the former urban district, with its council taking the name Northam Town Council. The town council continues to be based at the 1934 building on Windmill Lane, but has renamed it Town Hall.

This is the local website for Northam where all community activities and business can be found.

== Northam Burrows ==
A Site of Special Scientific Interest (SSSI), Northam Burrows is a saltmarsh and dune landscape, adjacent to the Torridge Estuary.

It is part of the North Devon Areas of Outstanding Natural Beauty, and sits within North Devon's Biosphere Reserve.

It is also home to the oldest golf course in England, the Royal North Devon Golf Club.

== Sport and recreation ==
Northam has a King George's Field as a memorial to King George V.

Torridge Leisure Centre, off Churchill Way, has lane and learner pools. It also has a gymnasium and sauna.

== Facilities ==
Northam has a public library. This burned down in 2005 destroying the building and 90% of the books, in a fire believed to have been caused by the action of a hands-free magnifier on a pile of leaflets. The public library was threatened with closure in 2014 due to cuts in the County's budget.

== Railway ==
The Bideford, Westward Ho! and Appledore Railway (B,WH&A,R) was most unusual amongst British railways in that, although it was built as a standard gauge line, it was not joined to the rest of the railway network. This was despite the London and South Western Railway having a station at Bideford, East-the-Water, meaning on the other side of the River Torridge from the main town.

The line was wholly situated on the peninsula made up of Westward Ho!, Northam and Appledore with extensive sand dunes the Torridge and Taw estuary. Northam station and the line closed in 1917 having been requisitioned by the War Office, and is now used as part of the Tarka Trail cycle route which forms part of the South West Coast Path.

== Bus services ==
- Stagecoach 21= Barnstaple to Westward Ho!
- Stagecoach 21A= Barnstaple to Appledore
- Stagecoach 16 = Bideford - Westward Ho! - Appledore

Westward Ho! Buses serve The Square, Sandymere Rd and Atlantic Way.

Appledore Buses serve Lenards Rd and Churchill Way.

The 16 Bus service serves Morwenna Park Road, Sea View Road, Windsor Road and JH Taylor Drive

== Notable residents ==
- Steven Borough (1525–1584), an English navigator and an early Arctic explorer.
- Admiral Sir Richard Goodwin Keats (1757–1834), of Port Hill and Durrant House, a Royal Navy officer and colonial administrator
- Godiva Marian Thorold (1840-1918), a British nurse, matron, and a founding member of the British Nursing Association.
- Sir George Stapledon (1882–1960), a British grassland scientist and pioneer environmentalist.
- Clarence Raybould (1886–1972), conductor, pianist and composer, buried locally with his wife in St Margaret's Church.
- Arthur Palmer (1912–1994), a British politician and MP for 4 constituencies from 1945 to 1983.
- Rose West (born 1953), serial killer, who collaborated with her husband, Fred West.

=== Sport ===
- John Henry Taylor (1871–1963), golfer, winner of The Open Championship five times and helped found the British PGA.
- Jack Oke (1880–1950), an English professional golfer, winner of the first Canadian Open in 1904.
- Jack Taylor (1897–1971), an English professional golfer, winner of the Dutch Open in 1929.

== Twin towns – sister cities ==
Northam is twinned with:

- Mondeville, France since 1974
