= Northam (surname) =

Northam is a surname. Notable people with the surname include:

- Bill Northam (1905–1988), Australian Olympic yachtsman
- Cyril Northam (1894–1981), English footballer
- Jeremy Northam (born 1961), British actor
- John Northam (1922–2004), professor emeritus of literature and drama at Cambridge University and father of Jeremy Northam
- Ralph Northam (born 1959), American politician and physician
