= Royal British Nurses' Association =

Nursing organisation in the United Kingdom

The Royal British Nurses' Association was founded in December 1887 by Ethel Bedford-Fenwick, with leading matrons from voluntary, local authority and military hospitals including; Isla Stewart of St Bartholomew's Hospital, Godiva Thorold of the Middlesex Hospital, Miss Hogg of Haslar Hospital and Anne Gibson of Brownlow Hill Infirmary, Liverpool

The early objectives were : to obtain a charter to enable the association to examine and register nurses, conferring degrees; to devise schemes for annuity pensions and sick funds for nurses; the formation and management of convalescent and holiday homes for nurses as well as alms houses for retired nurses; and the organisation of conferences on questions relating to the profession of nursing. It described itself as a union or organisation of nurses for professional objects and campaigned for the establishment of a register of nurses. It wanted the training to last three years with national standards.

Princess Christian was the president from its foundation. The first trustees were the Duke of St.Albans and the Duke of Abercorn. In 1891, it received the prefix "Royal", and received a royal charter in 1892. In a speech Princess Christian made in 1893, she made clear that the association was working towards "improving the education and status of those devoted and self-sacrificing women whose whole lives have been devoted to tending the sick, the suffering, and the dying". In the same speech, she warned about opposition and misrepresentation they had encountered. Although the association was in favour of registration as a means of enhancing and guaranteeing the professional status of trained nurses, its charter with the Privy Council allowed it to maintain a list rather than a formal register of nurses, but as the list had no formal status few nurses joined it, and the campaign for registration continued. The charter altered the constitution, and Mrs Bedford-Fenwick lost her permanent position. One condition of the royal charter was the placing of representatives of medical associations on the Executive Board and especially a large number of general practitioners on the committee entrusted with the registration of nurses. The British Medical Association had not been in favour of the charter.

Alice Ravenhill was the secretary of the association from 1894 to 1897. Other prominent members included Beatrice Cutler, Margaret Graham, Margaret Huxley, Rachel Lumsden Non-nurses included Alice Ravenhill Secretary from 1894; Herbert J. Paterson who was medical honorary secretary c.1910; Josephine Barnes President c.1990.

It set up a nurses' co-operative, the Chartered Nurses Association, in 1896. In 1905 it employed 120 nurses taking 7.5% of their earnings.

The passing of the Midwives Act 1902 encouraged the campaign for registration of nurses. The association helped to set up the Central Committee for the Society for the State Registration of Trained Nurses in 1908.

The RBNA gradually went into decline following the Nurses Registration Act 1919; after six failed attempts between 1904 and 1918, the British parliament passed the bill allowing formal nurse registration. In 1925 it had about 5,000 members – around a fifth of the membership of the College of Nursing.

The Royal British Nurses' Association was still in existence as of 2020, administering a number of very small charities for sick and disabled nurses until they were closed in 2020.
