= Richmond Parkway =

The name Richmond Parkway may refer to:

- In California:
  - Richmond Parkway (California) in Richmond, California
  - Richmond Parkway Transit Center, a bus hub in Richmond, California
- In New York:
  - Korean War Veterans Parkway, Staten Island, officially named Richmond Parkway until 1997 and still commonly known by that name
