= Northam railway station (Devon) =

Former railway station in England

Northam
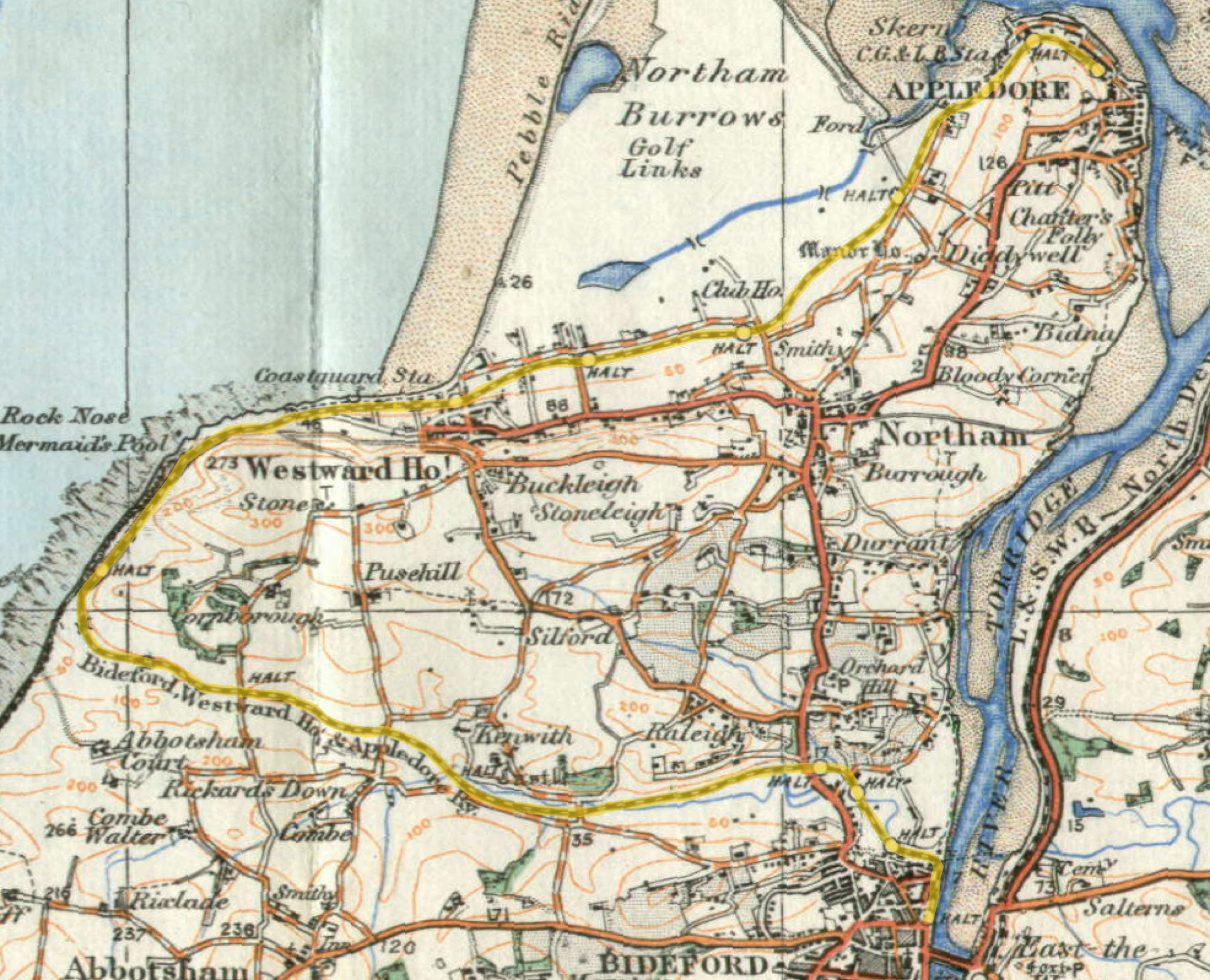
- Map showing the position of Northam station

General information
- Location: Northam, Torridge; England
- Coordinates: 51.0442°N 4.2189°W
- Grid reference: SS445295
- Platforms: 1

Other information
- Status: Disused

History
- Original company: Bideford, Westward Ho! and Appledore Railway
- Pre-grouping: British Electric Traction

Key dates
- 20 May 1901: Opened
- 28 March 1917: Closed
Location

Northam railway station was a railway station on the Bideford, Westward Ho! and Appledore Railway in north Devon, close to Appledore. The station served the village of Northam, Parish of Northam, a community within the Appledore peninsula. It was 5 miles 45 chains (5.56 miles, 8.95 km) from Bideford.

== History ==
Northam station was the terminus of the line in 1901 prior to the extension to Appledore in 1908. The station stood a little way from the village of Northam. Many of the passengers were golfers on their way to the links on Northam Burrows.

=== Infrastructure ===
Northam had one platform 180 feet (55 m) in length, with a shelter, on the down side of the line. It originally had a short run-around loop, a signal box and one semaphore signal, but with the completion of the extension to Appledore in 1908 it was reduced to a single line without sidings or signalling. A goods yard was provided at one time. The line, without gates, crossed Pimpley Road on the level before reaching the Richmond Road request halt.

== Micro history ==
In January 1901 a one-carriage train ran from Bideford to Northam carrying a few friends of the railway's directors.

Jack Shears, who lived at Northam, was one of the trackmen who worked to maintain the permanent way.

No photographs appear to exist of Northam railway station.

Preceding station	Disused railways	Following station
Richmond Road Halt; Line and station closed	Bideford, Westward Ho! and Appledore Railway	Beach Road; Line and station closed
