= Appledore, Torridge =

Village in Devon, England

Coordinates: 51.0525°N 4.1945°W

Appledore
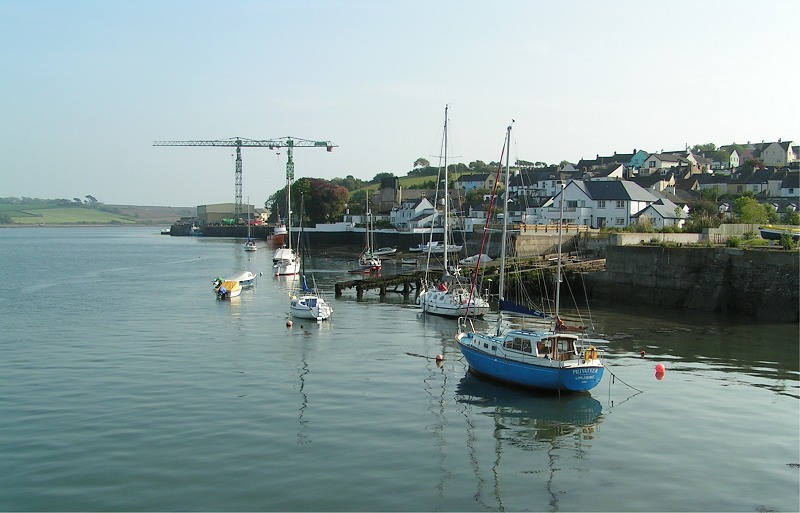
- Looking from the quay towards the last remaining shipyard at Appledore (May 2004)

- Location within Devon
- Population: 2,814 (Note: Combination of census data for the wards of Appledore West (728 persons) and Appledore East (1,386 persons). *"Appledore West (Ward) 2001 Population: All people". Census 2001. Office for National Statistics. 1 April 2001. *"Appledore East (Ward) 2001 Population: All people". Census 2001. Office for National Statistics. 1 April 2001.)
- OS grid reference: SS465305
- District: Torridge
- Shire county: Devon
- Region: South West
- Country: England
- Sovereign state: United Kingdom
- Post town: Bideford
- Postcode district: EX39
- Dialling code: 01237
- Police: Devon and Cornwall
- Fire: Devon and Somerset
- Ambulance: South Western
- UK Parliament: Torridge & West Devon

Appledore is a village at the mouth of the River Torridge, about 6 miles (10 km) west of Barnstaple and about 3 miles (5 km) north of Bideford in the county Devon, England. It is the home of Appledore Shipbuilders, a lifeboat slipway and Hocking's Ice Cream, a brand of ice cream only sold in North Devon. There are numerous shops, cafes and galleries. The local football club is Appledore F.C. The ward population at the 2011 census increased to 2,814.

== History ==
Appledore is not mentioned in the Domesday Book of 1086 (though it mentions two other, smaller, Appledores in Devon). Its earliest recorded name, in 1335, is le Apildore in the manor of Northam. There was a Saxon settlement, but the Devon historian WG Hoskins says of the local legend that it was the site of a Viking raid in 878 AD, 'there is no authority for this identification'. The settlement prospered as a port in the Elizabethan period, and some cottages date from this period. The construction of a quay in 1845 further developed the port, and as a result Appledore has a rich maritime heritage from the second half of the 19th century. The painter Edward Calvert was born there in 1799. Shipowner Sir William Reardon Smith was born in Appledore and went to the Wesleyan school there. The population in the 1841 census was 2,174 inhabitants.

The Richmond Dry Dock was built in 1856 by William Yeo and named after Richmond Bay in Prince Edward Island, where the Yeo family's shipping fleet was based. From 1882 until the 1930s it was owned by Robert Cook, and continued in use until the 1960s. It is a Grade II* listed building. There is a maritime museum in the village chronicling the history of shipbuilding and seafaring in the village.

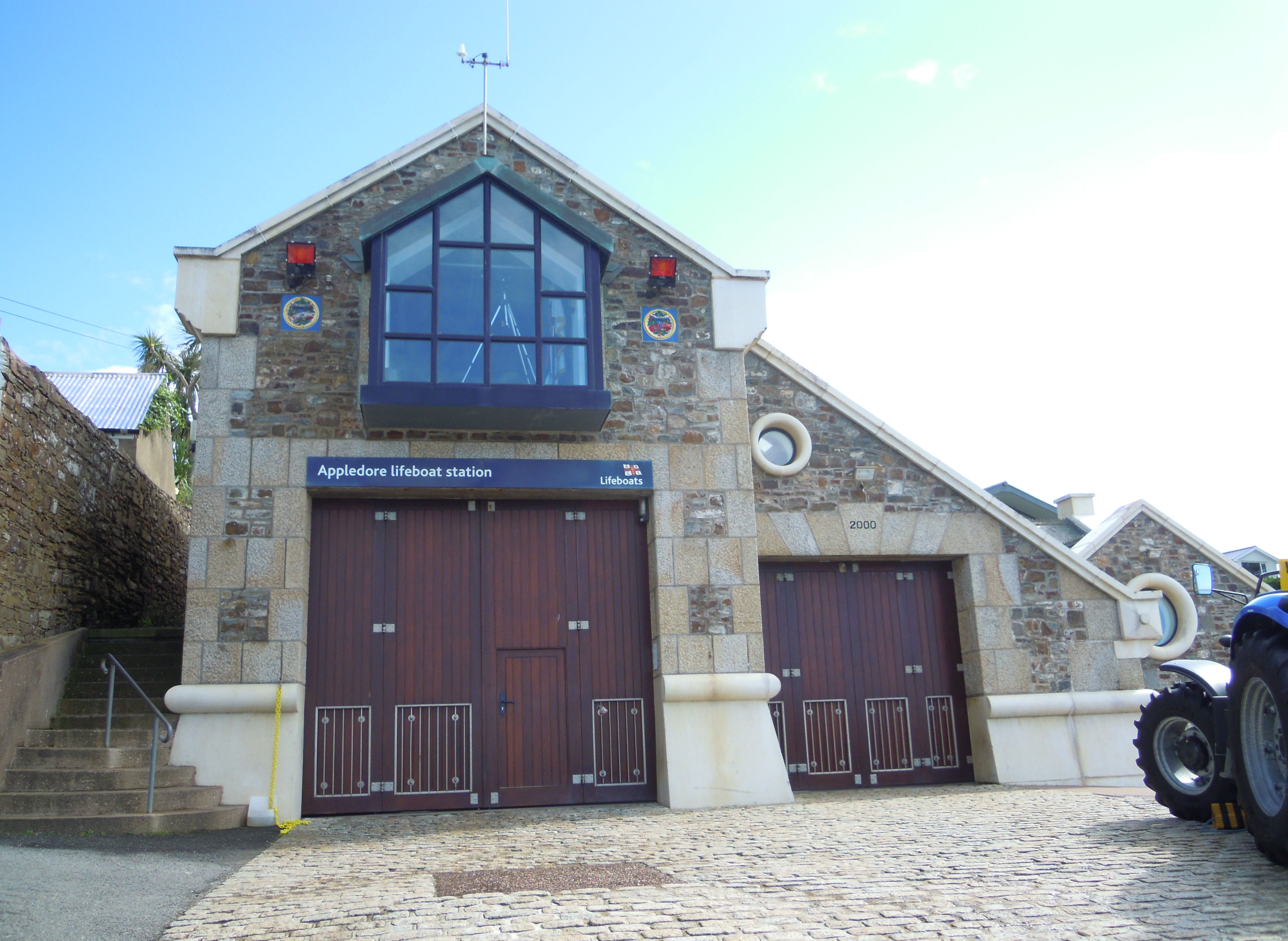
Appledore Lifeboat Station in 2017

A lifeboat service for the area around the mouth of the River Taw was introduced in February 1825. The boat was kept in the King's Watch House at Appledore for six years until a new boat house was built at Watertown, half a mile nearer the sea. From 1848 a second lifeboat was stationed at Braunton Burrows on the opposite side of the estuary but its crew always came from Appledore. A third station was built at Northam Burrows to the west of Appledore in 1851 and the Appledore boat moved there. A new station at Badsteps allowed Northam Burrows to close in 1889 and Braunton Burrows closed in 1918 as it was difficult to find men and horses to launch the boat. Appledore Lifeboat Station was rebuilt in 2001 and is home to an inshore lifeboat; a larger all-weather Tamar class boat is kept moored just off shore.

== Railway ==
The Bideford, Westward Ho! and Appledore Railway (B,WH&A,R) was most unusual amongst British railways in that although it was built as a standard gauge line (4 ft 8 1/2in) it was not joined to the rest of the railway network, despite the London and South Western Railway having a station at Bideford, East-the-Water, meaning on the other side of the River Torridge from the main town. The line was wholly situated on the peninsula made up of Westward Ho!, Northam and Appledore with extensive sand dunes, at the mouth of the Torridge and Taw estuary. Appledore railway station and the whole line closed in 1917 having been requisitioned by the War Office (Stuckey 1962).

== Sport and leisure ==
Appledore has a non-League football club Appledore F.C. who play at Marshford. They are currently members of the Devon Football League.

Appledore has two pilot Gig clubs in the village, Appledore PGC and Torridge PGC. They both compete in Westcountry regattas and the world championships on the Isles of Scilly. Appledore men's crews are in the world's top 10.

== Transport ==
Appledore is served by an hourly Stagecoach Bus service 21A. It serves: Appledore - Northam - Bideford - Instow - Fremington - Barnstaple. In the summer months, the buses double in frequency to 2 buses an hour.

Stagecoach also runs a circular route called 16. It serves: Bideford - Westward Ho! - West Appledore - Appledore - Northam (Via Square) and then back to Bideford. This bus runs 6 times a week on Tuesdays and Thursday (3x each day)

During summer a ferry service operates across the Torridge estuary from Appledore slipway to Instow Quay. The service runs two hours either side of high tide. Aimed both at locals and users of the Tarka Trail / South West Coast Path this has been operated in recent times as a not-for-profit service on days when water levels in the estuary have been high enough.

== Gallery ==
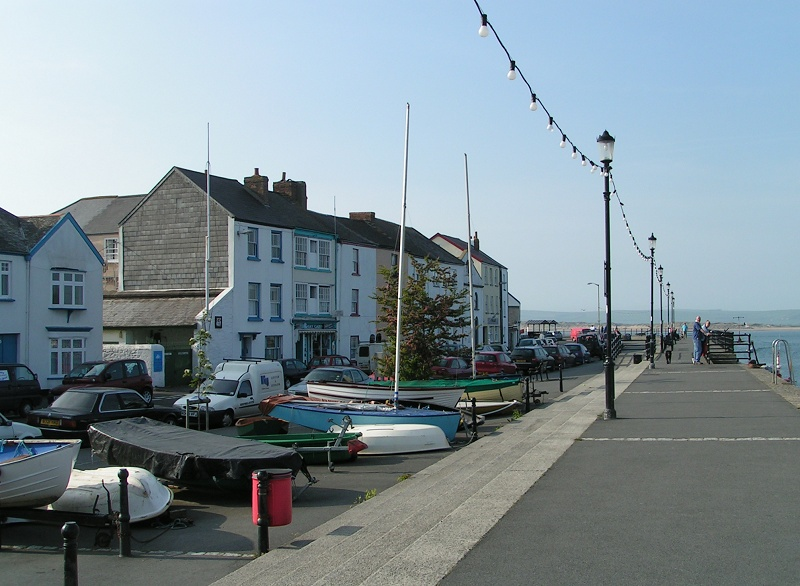
The quay at Appledore

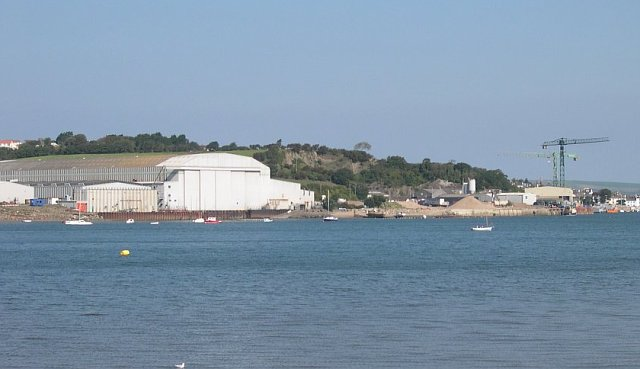
A view of Appledore Shipyard from the opposite side of the Torridge estuary

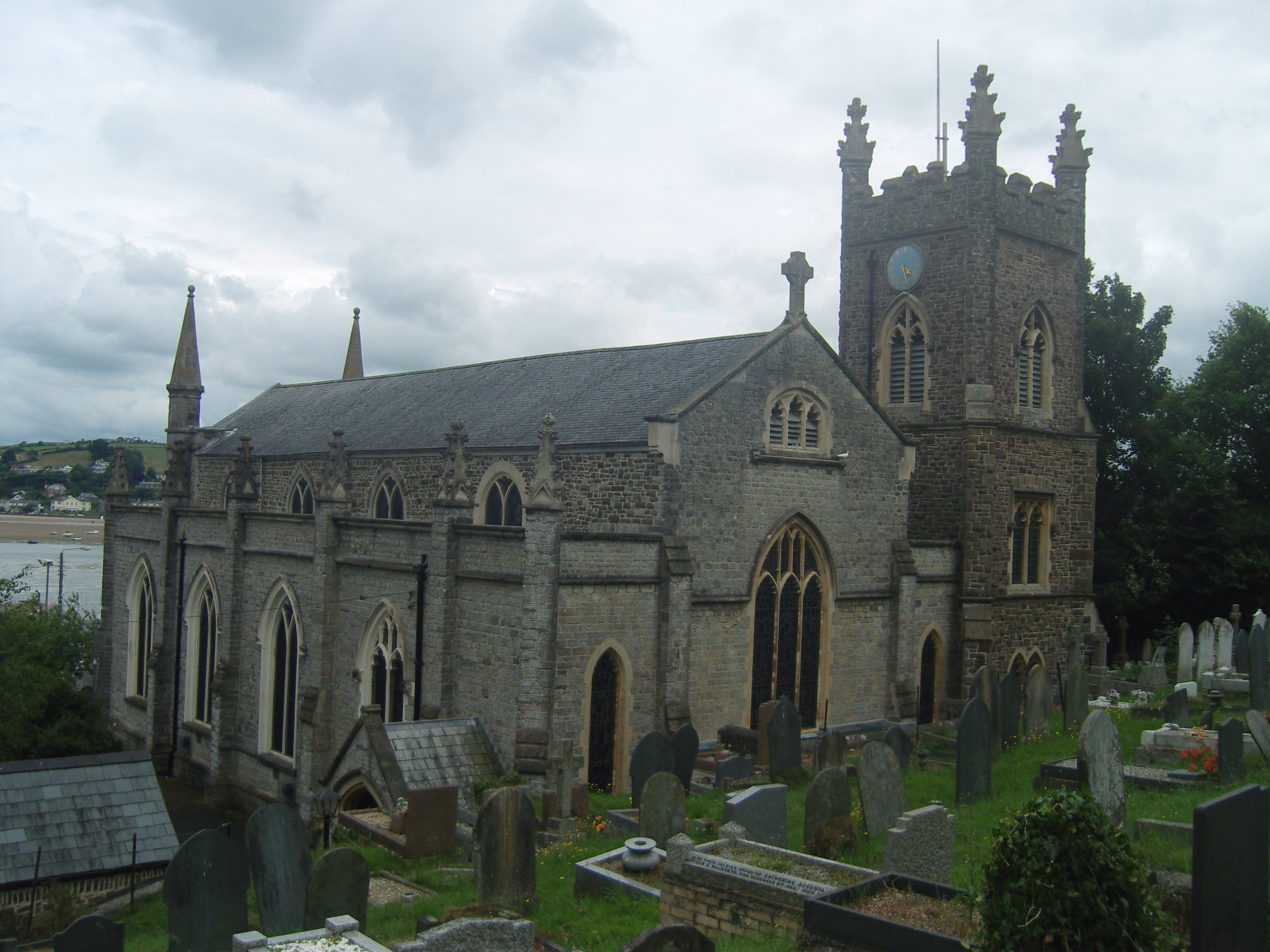
St Mary's Church, Appledore

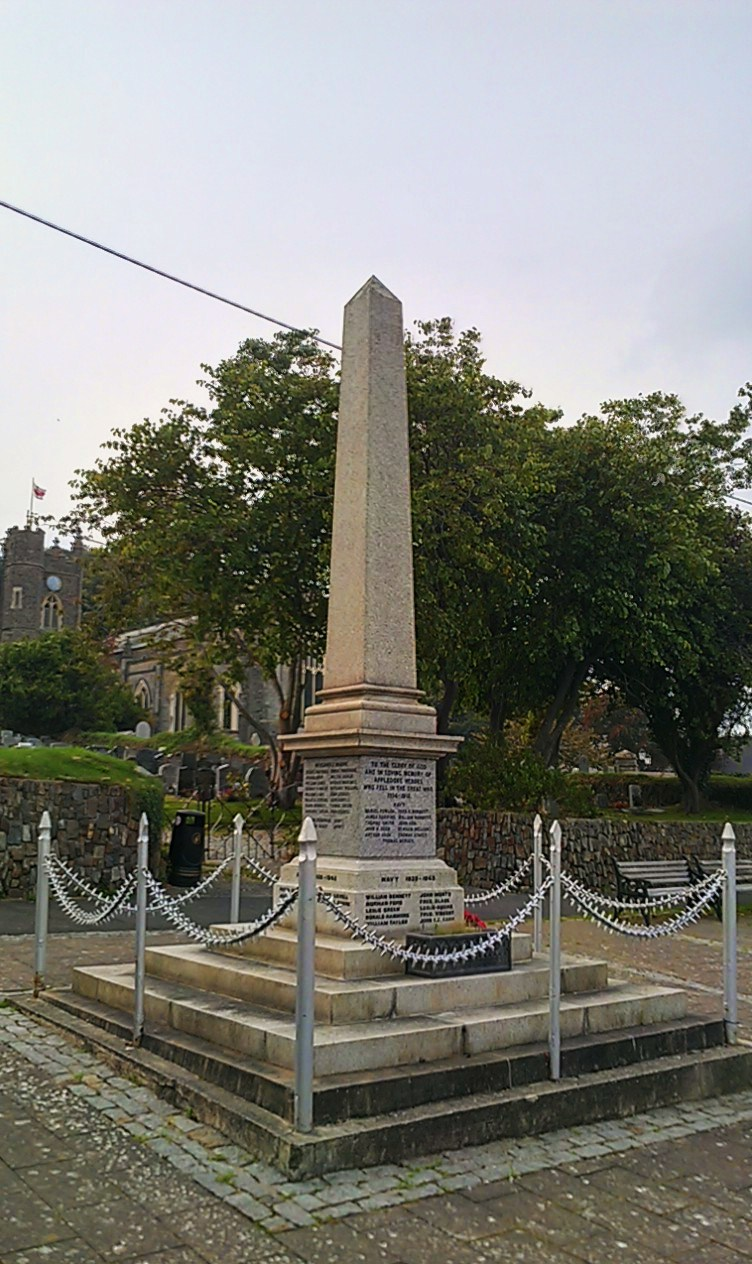
A monument to the fallen soldiers of World War II

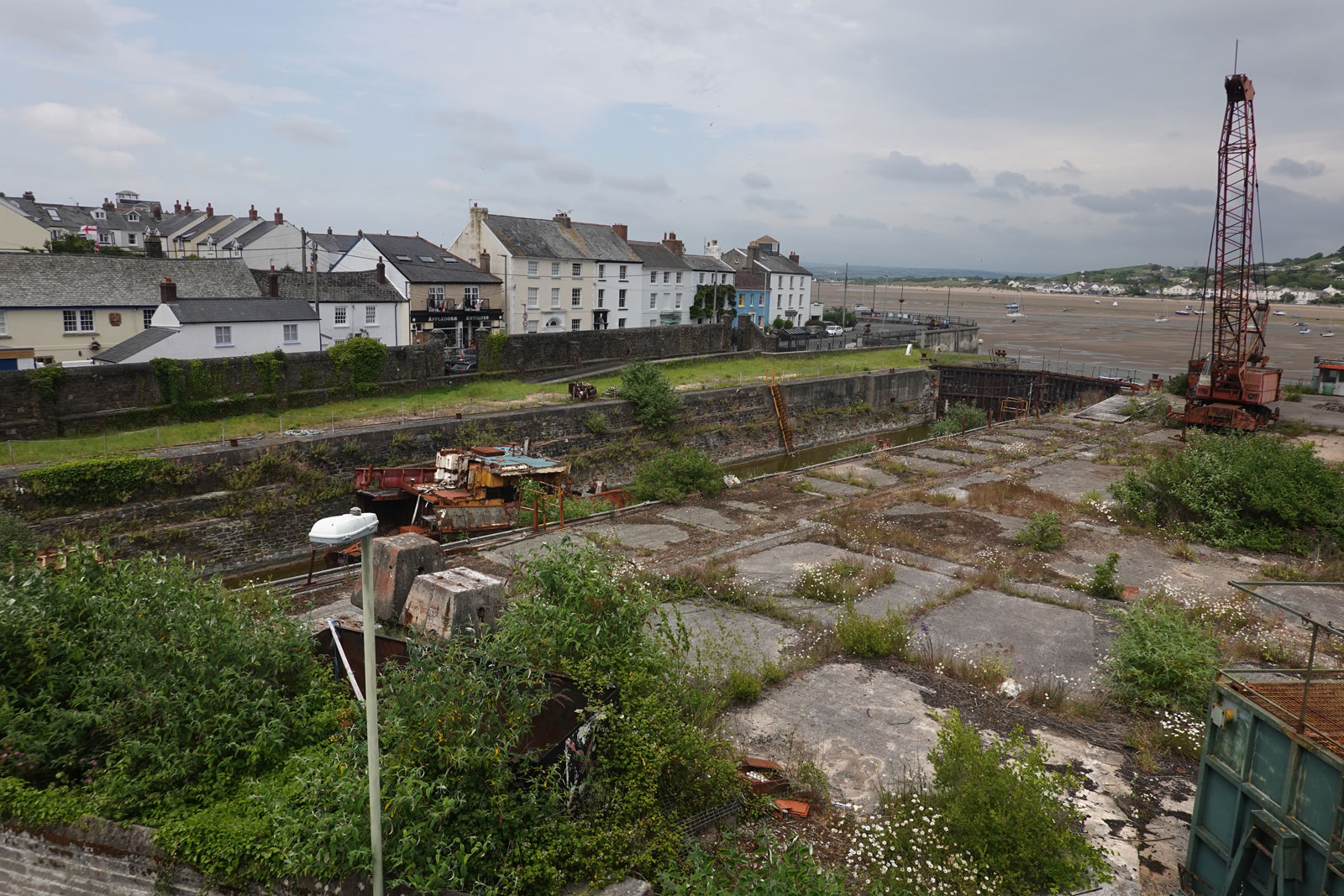
Richmond Dock in June 2021

== In popular culture ==
In his novel Westward Ho!, Charles Kingsley describes Appledore as a "little white fishing village".

Nikolai Tolstoy, Patrick O'Brian's stepson, considers that the fictional town of Shelmerston in O'Brian's Aubrey-Maturin series may have been based on Appledore. O'Brian's wife Mary Wicksteed grew up in Appledore.

In 2008, the Jackson family (including Tito Jackson) stayed for six weeks in Appledore while searching for a house to buy in the area. The project was filmed for a Channel 4 documentary The Jacksons are Coming, which was aired on 27 November 2008.

== Notable people ==
- David Mervyn Blow FRS (1931–2004), biophysicist known for the development of X-ray crystallography of proteins, died in Appledore.

== See also ==
- HMS Appledore
- South West Coast Path
- St Mary's Church, Appledore (Church of England)
