= Causeway railway station =

Former railway station in Devon, England

Causeway
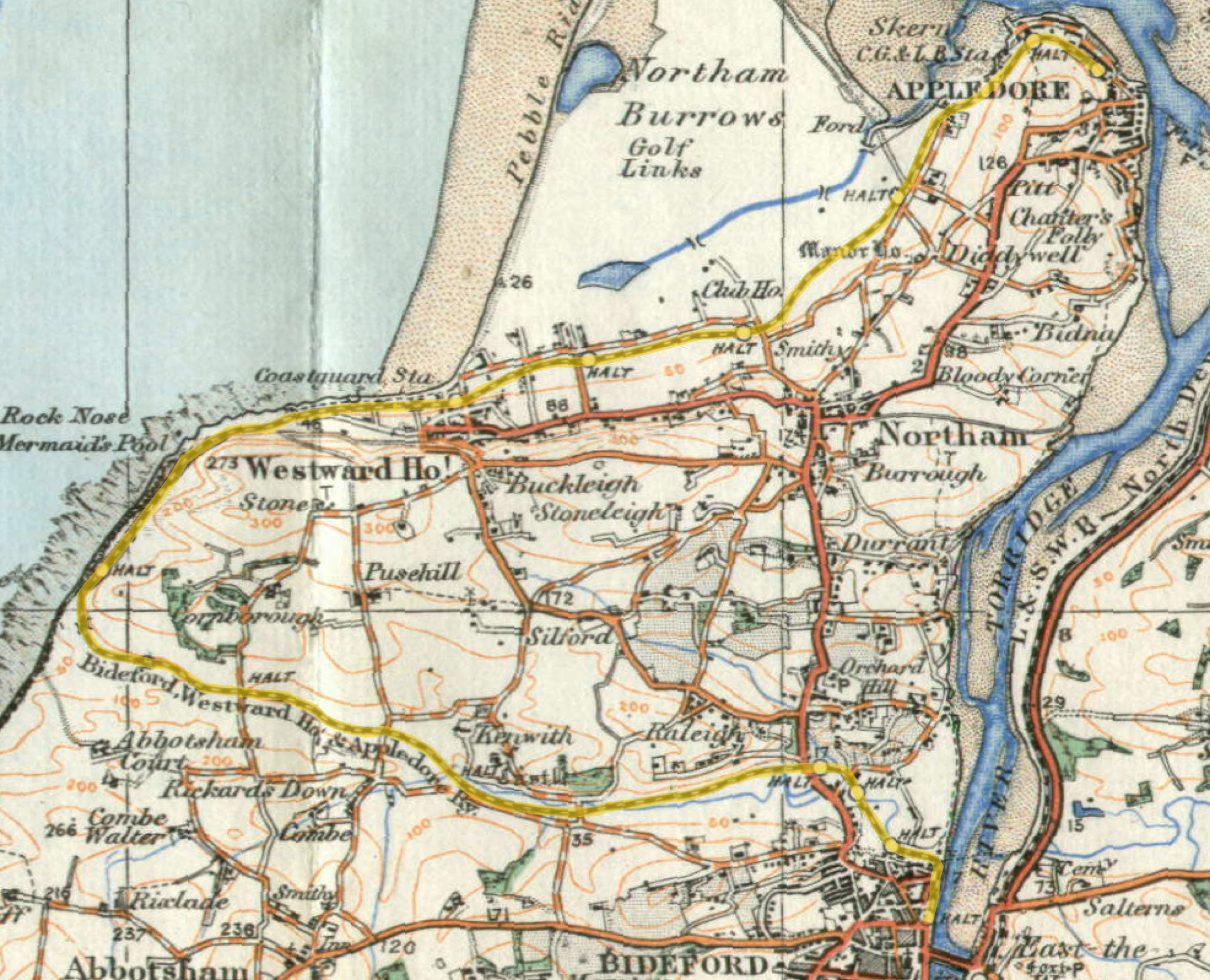
- Map showing the position of Causeway Crossing Halt

General information
- Location: Bideford, Torridge; England
- Coordinates: 51.027015°N 4.212526°W
- Grid reference: SS449273
- Platforms: 1

Other information
- Status: Disused

History
- Original company: Bideford, Westward Ho! and Appledore Railway
- Pre-grouping: British Electric Traction

Key dates
- 20 May 1901: Opened
- 28 March 1917: Closed
Location

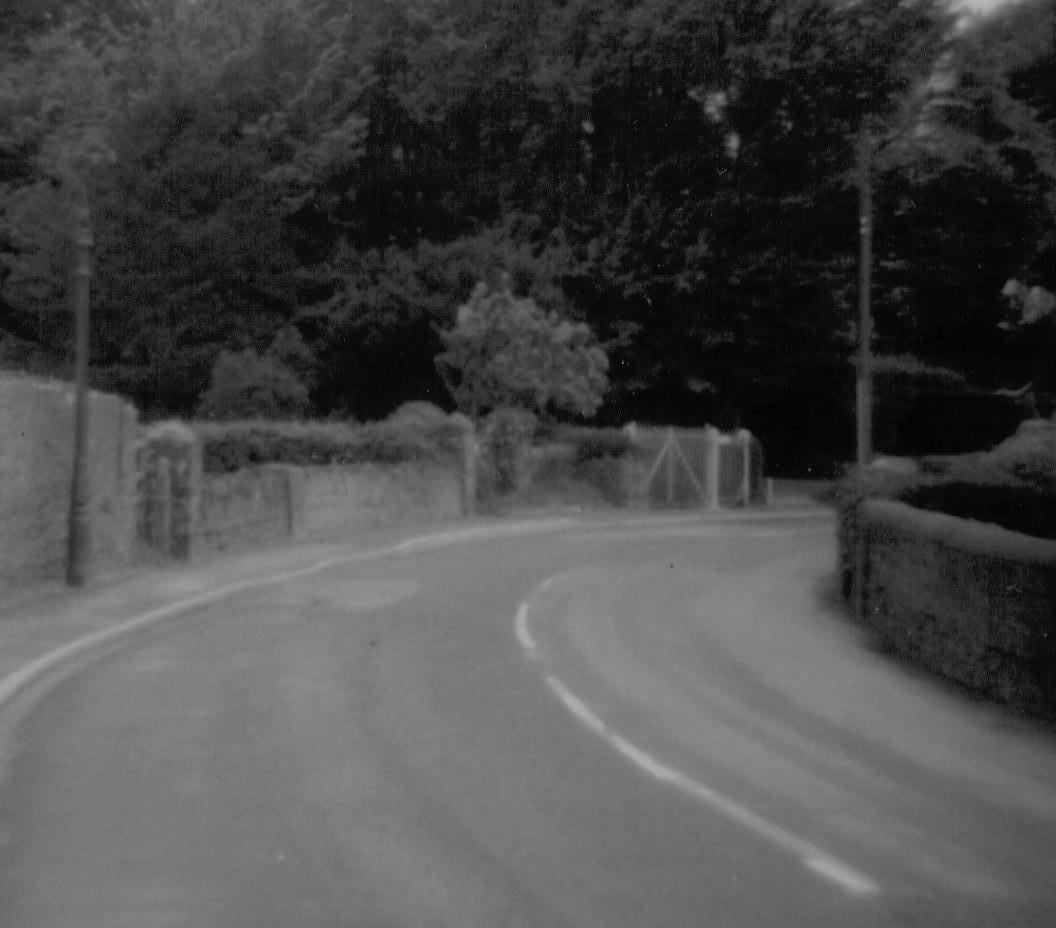
The Causeway site in the 1960s

Causeway railway station was a minor railway station or halt/request stop in north Devon, close to Bideford, on the Bideford, Westward Ho! and Appledore Railway, serving the outskirts of the town. It lay 0 mile and 66 chains from Bideford Quay. Passengers waiting to board had to give a hand signal for the train to stop.

== History ==
The Causeway Crossing was the most important halt on the railway being close to a number of residential developments. Mr. Fursey was the gatekeeper who lived in the crossing keeper's cottage and was locally known as "the station master".

== Infrastructure ==
The halt had no freight facilities. A platform 20 by 30 feet (6.1 by 9.1 m) was present on the down side, 6 inches (15 cm) high and fenced at the back with no shelter. A small crossing keeper's cottage was present with a window that may have been used for selling tickets.

A two and a half storey signal cabin was built on the down side of the line to control the busy road crossing, with sufficient height to see along the road and railway. It was the largest signal box on the line and was entered by a staircase situated at the rear. It was not a block post, but it had an internal wheel to operate the gates. It was probably connected by phone to the signal boxes at Bideford Yard and Abbotsham Road. The substantial crossing gates opened inwards to close off the line and pedestrian gates were also present. Oil lamps with a red light were present on the gates.

The level crossing was protected by up and down stop semaphore signals. The up home signal at the Causeway Crossing Halt carried a fish-tailed distant signal that worked in conjunction with Chanters Lane's (The Lane) crossing home signal.

== Micro history ==
In January 1901, the first train, with one carriage, ran from Bideford to Northam carrying a few friends of the Directors.

The crossing keeper's house in 1999 still existed as an enlarged private dwelling.

On closure, the Causeway Crossing box was purchased by a local farmer, Mr. Atkins. He tried to convert it into an extension to his house but failed and sold the box to a person in Westward Ho! who used it as a summer house. It still existed in 1968.

Preceding station	Disused railways	Following station
Kenwith Castle Halt; Line and station closed	Bideford, Westward Ho! and Appledore Railway	The Lane Halt; Line and station closed
