= Abbotsham Road railway station =

Disused railway station in Devon, England

Abbotsham Road
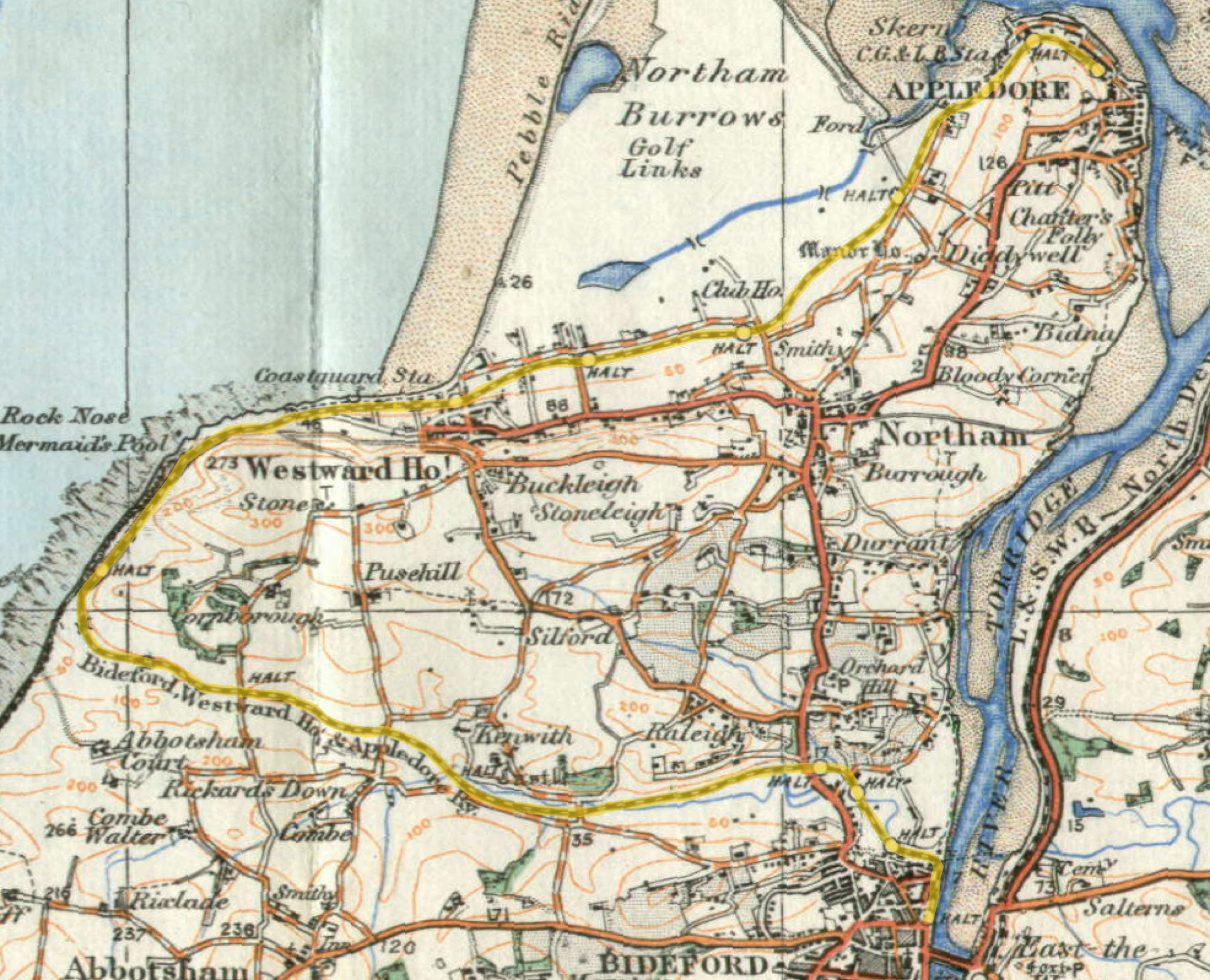
- The route and site of the station

General information
- Location: Bideford, Torridge; England
- Coordinates: 51.027333°N 4.252667°W
- Grid reference: SS421277
- Platforms: 2

Other information
- Status: Disused

History
- Opened: 20 May 1901
- Closed: 28 March 1917
- Original company: Bideford, Westward Ho! and Appledore Railway
Location

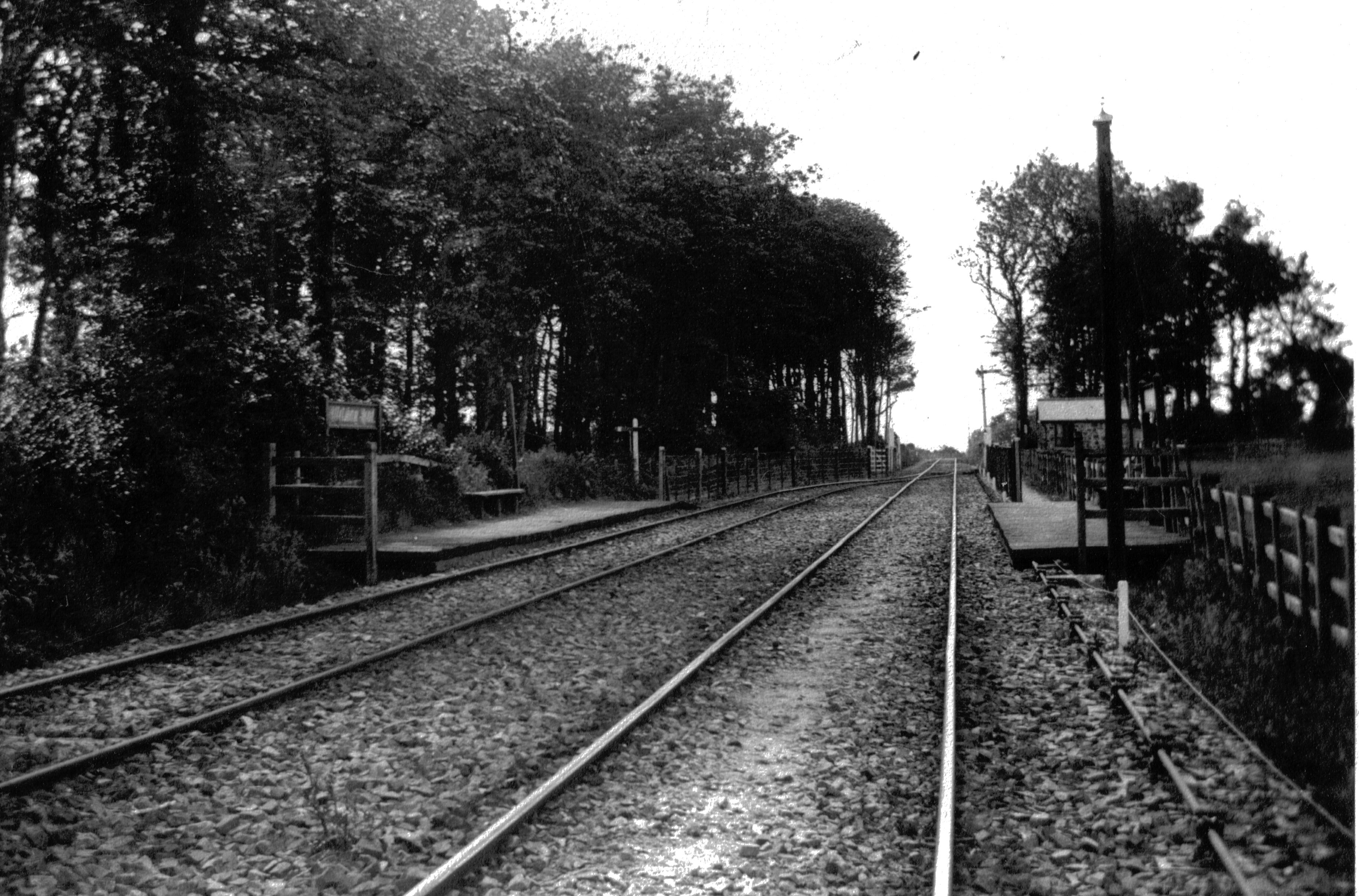
Abbotsham Road station, looking towards Westward Ho!, circa 1908

Abbotsham Road railway station was a small railway station on the independent Bideford, Westward Ho! and Appledore Railway in the English county of Devon. It lay 2 miles 50 chains (4.2 km) from Bideford Quay.

== History ==
Previously named Mudcott, the station was in open countryside at the Mudcott Road level crossing. It was known as Mudcott Passing Loop until the passenger platforms were brought into use.

=== Infrastructure ===
It had a passing loop, two wooden platforms and what appears to have been a ticket office-cum-signal box hut. No freight facilities were provided. The signal box was probably connected by phone to the signal boxes at Bideford Yard and The Causeway.

Christie records that the railway company had built a path to allow volunteers from the local militia in Bideford to walk to their nearby rifle range and that this was "a pretty station in the midst of trees."

== See also ==
- Appledore station
- Northam station
- Westward Ho! railway station

Preceding station	Disused railways	Following station
Cornborough; Line and station closed	Bideford, Westward Ho! and Appledore Railway; British Electric Traction	Kenwith Castle Halt; Line and station closed
