= Beach Road railway station =

Disused railway station in Torridge, England

Beach Road
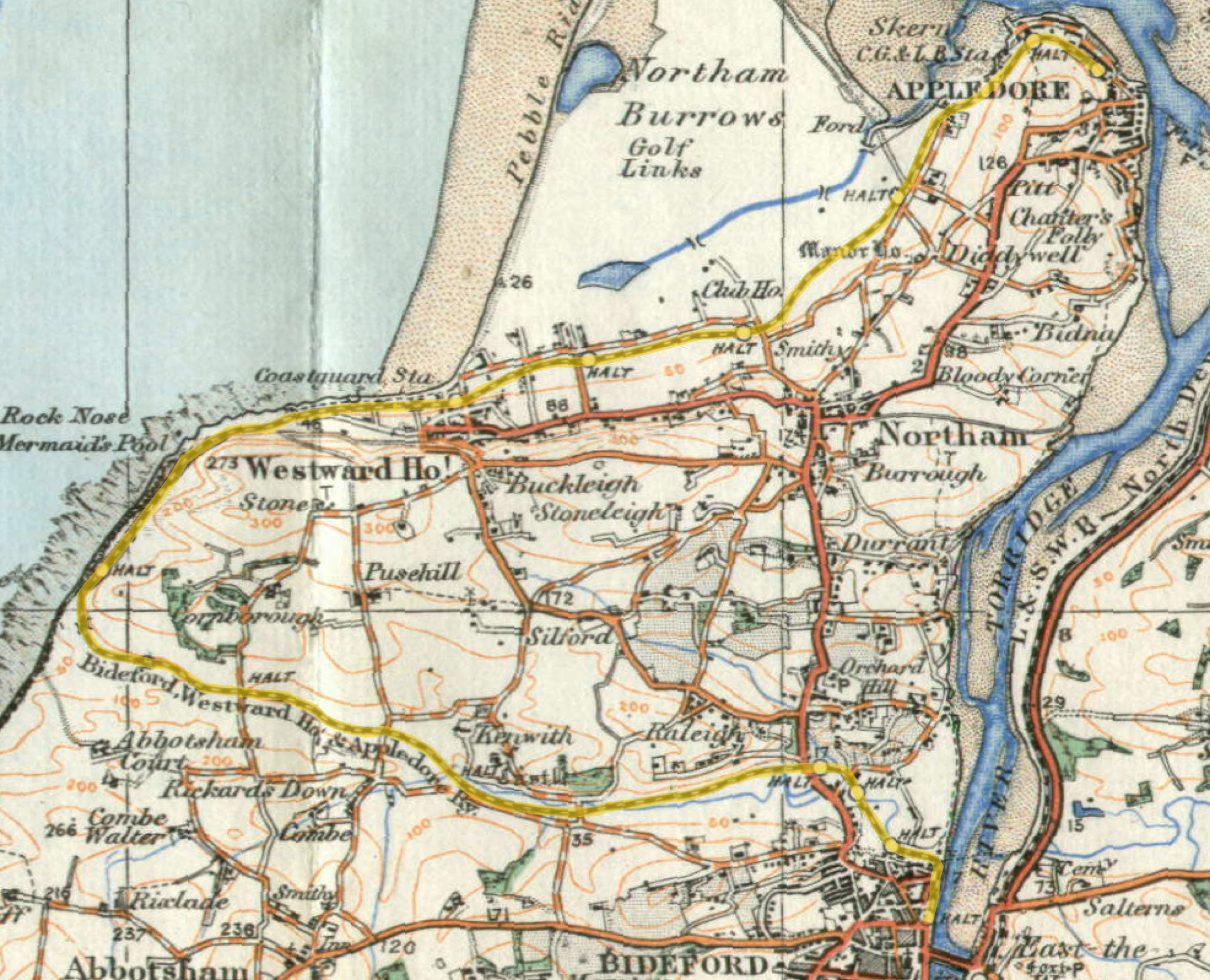
- Map showing the position of Beach Road Halt

General information
- Location: Westward Ho!, Torridge; England
- Coordinates: 51.0422°N 4.2288°W
- Grid reference: SS438293

Other information
- Status: Disused

History
- Original company: Bideford, Westward Ho! and Appledore Railway
- Pre-grouping: British Electric Traction

Key dates
- 20 May 1901: Opened
- 28 March 1917: Closed
Location

Beach Road railway station was a minor railway station or halt/request stop in north Devon, close to Westward Ho!, serving the residents of Eastboune Terrace and the outlying areas of Westward Ho!.

== History ==
This was the last stop before Northam that was the terminus station on the line in 1901 prior to the extension to Appledore of 1908.

=== Infrastructure ===
Beach Road Halt had no shelter or platform. A level crossing was located nearby, however the gates were removed in 1905. It had no freight facilities.

== Micro history ==
In January 1901, the first train, with one carriage, ran from Bideford to Northam carrying a few friends of the Directors.

Jack Shears, who lived at Northam, was one of the trackmen who worked to maintain the permanent way.

No photographs appear to exist of Beach Road Halt.

Preceding station	Disused railways	Following station
Northam; Line and station closed	Bideford, Westward Ho! and Appledore Railway	Westward Ho! Line and station closed
