= Cornborough =

Cornborough may refer to:

- Cornborough railway station, North Devon, England
- Vickii Cornborough (born 1990), English rugby union player
