= Bideford Quay railway station =

Disused railway station in Bideford, Torridge, England

Bideford Quay Station
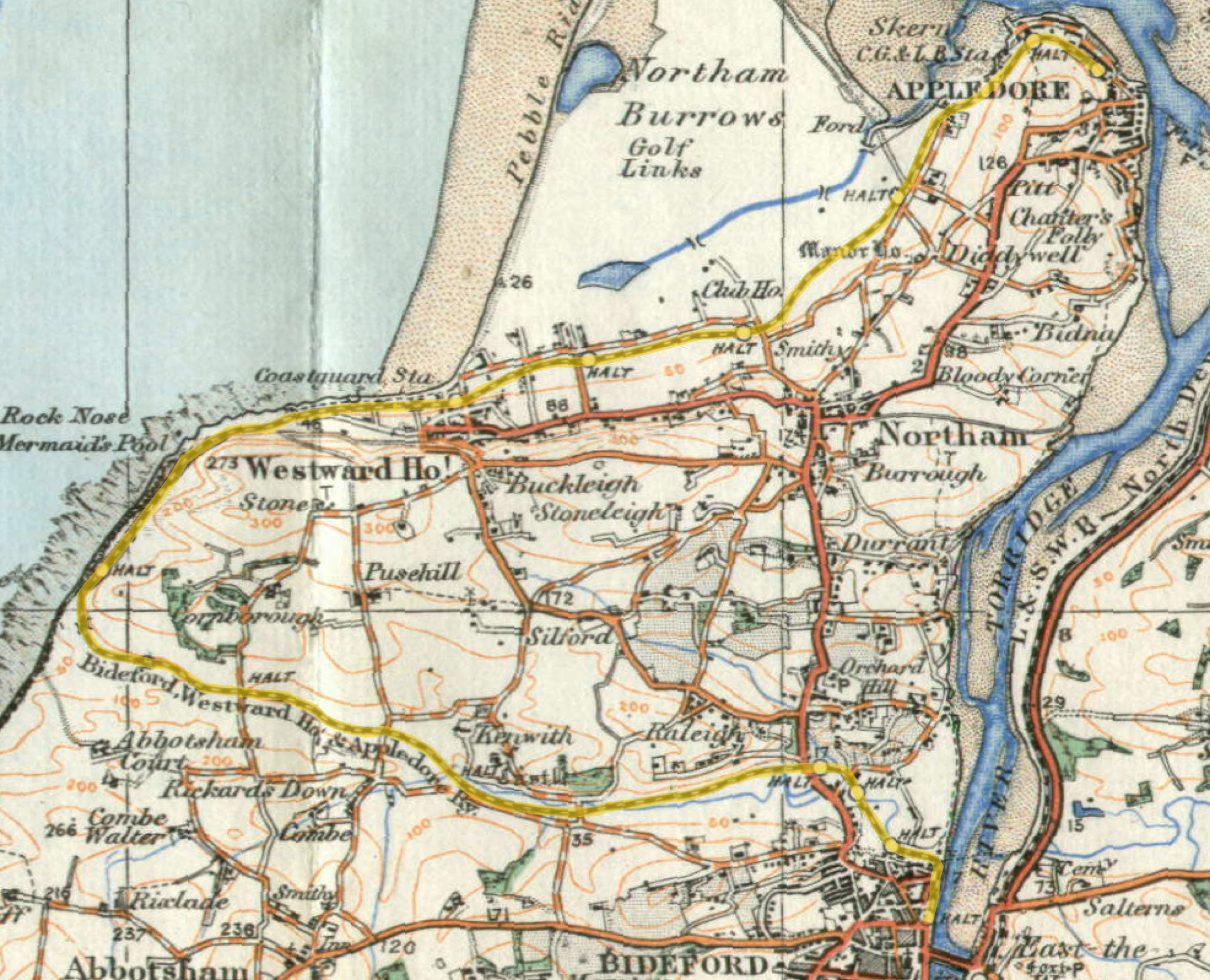
- Map showing the position of Causeway Crossing Halt

General information
- Location: Bideford, Torridge; England
- Coordinates: 51.019197°N 4.204331°W
- Grid reference: SS454267
- Platforms: No

Other information
- Status: Disused

History
- Original company: Bideford, Westward Ho! and Appledore Railway
- Pre-grouping: British Electric Traction

Key dates
- 20 May 1901: Opened
- 28 March 1917: Closed
Location

Bideford Quay Station was a railway station in Bideford, north Devon; the southern terminus on the Bideford, Westward Ho! and Appledore Railway, serving the town and passengers from Bideford railway station on the London and South Western Railway. It lay on Bideford Quay where the company offices were situated.

== History ==
The station lay on Bideford Quay and had a siding and after considerable opposition from the town council a run round loop. Situated on a public road the rails were not set on standard railway sleepers, running instead on sunken longitudinal timbers.

=== Infrastructure ===
The station had freight facilities consisting of a single siding and a parcels service. A platform was not provided and the first section running towards the Pill Road was a tramway. However, the run-round loop allowed for locomotives to run round the coaches.

== Micro history ==
In January 1901, the first train, with one carriage, ran from Bideford to Northam carrying a few friends of the Directors.

Preceding station	Disused railways	Following station
Strand Road; Line and station closed	Bideford, Westward Ho! and Appledore Railway	Terminus
