= Strand Road Halt railway station =

Disused railway station in Devon, England

Strand Road Halt
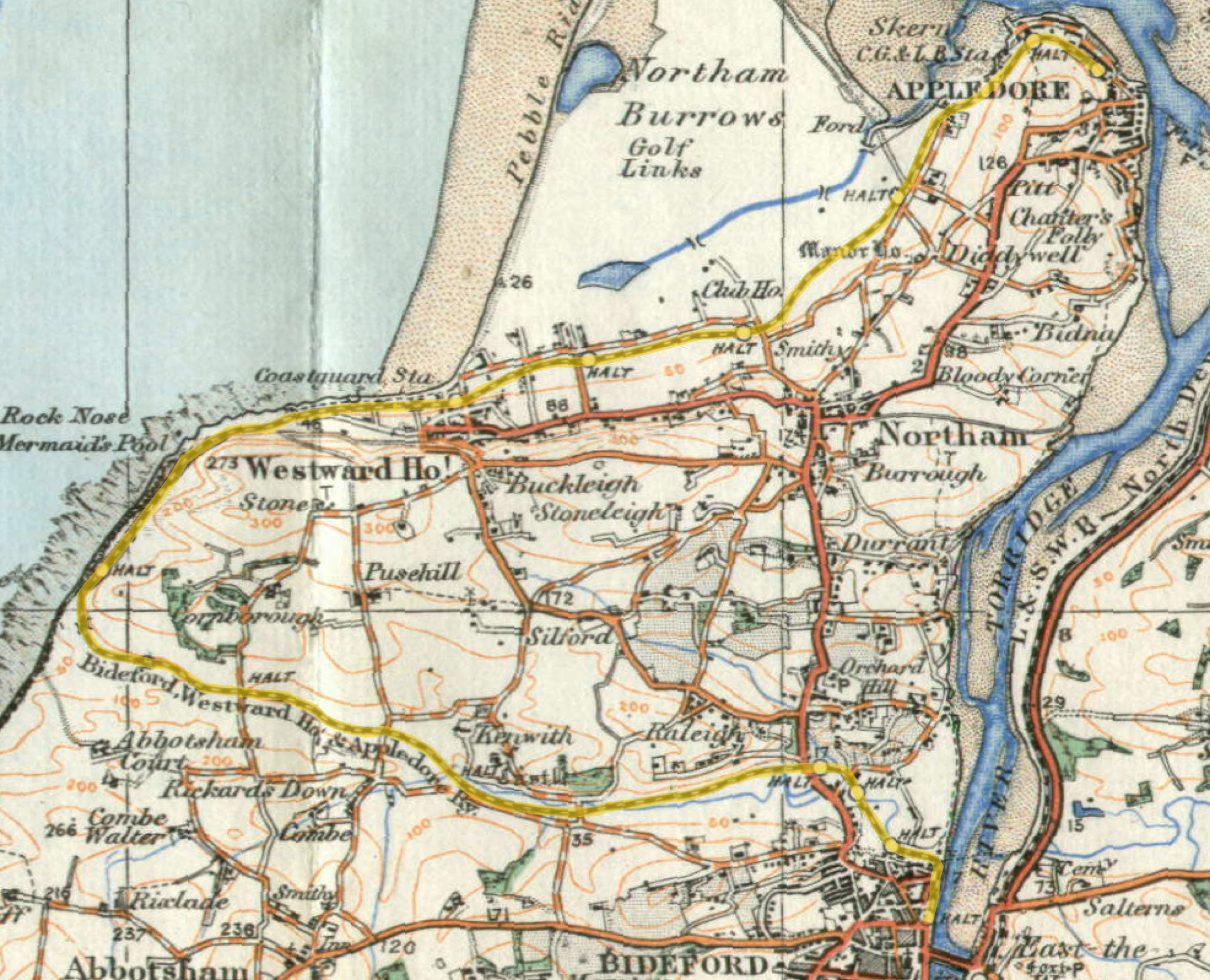
- Map showing the position of Causeway Crossing Halt

General information
- Location: Bideford, Torridge; England
- Coordinates: 51.020876°N 4.207313°W
- Grid reference: SS452269

Other information
- Status: Disused

History
- Original company: Bideford, Westward Ho! and Appledore Railway
- Pre-grouping: British Electric Traction

Key dates
- 20 May 1901: Opened
- 28 March 1917: Closed
Location

Strand Road Halt was a minor railway station or halt/request stop in north Devon, England, close to Bideford, on the Bideford, Westward Ho! and Appledore Railway, serving the outskirts of the town. It lay 0 mile and 32 chains from Bideford Quay.

== History ==
The halt lay close to the "Yard" with its sidings, carriage shed and engine shed. The name was often shortened to The Strand.

=== Infrastructure ===
The halt had no freight facilities. A platform does not appear to have been provided and as a request stop passengers had to clearly indicate that the train should halt. A single storey signal box was present with home semaphore signals.

== Micro history ==
In January 1901, the first train, with one carriage, ran from Bideford to Northam carrying a few friends of the Directors.

The fare from Bideford Quay to The Strand Halt was 1d.

Preceding station	Disused railways	Following station
The Lane; Line and station closed	Bideford, Westward Ho! and Appledore Railway	Bideford Quay; Line and station closed

== See also ==
- Bideford, Westward Ho! and Appledore Railway

== Bibliography ==
- Baxter, Julia; Baxter, Jonathan (1980). The Bideford, Westward Ho! and Appledore Railway 1901–1917. H J Chard & Sons. ISBN 0-9507330-1-6.
- Christie, Peter (1995). North Devon History. The Lazarus Press. ISBN 1-898546-08-8.
- Garner, Rod (2008). The Bideford, Westward Ho! & Appledore Railway. Pub. Kestrel Railway Books. ISBN 978-1-905505-09-8.
- Griffith, Roger (1969). The Bideford, Westward Ho! and Appledore Railway. School project and personal communications. Bideford Museum.
- Jenkins, Stanley C. (1993). The Bideford, Westward Ho! and Appledore Railway. Oxford: Oakwood Press. ISBN 0-85361-452-0.
- Stuckey, Douglas (1962). The Bideford, Westward Ho! and Appledore Railway 1901-1917. Pub. West Country Publications.
