= Kenwith Castle Halt railway station =

Disused railway station in Devon, England

Kenwith Castle Halt
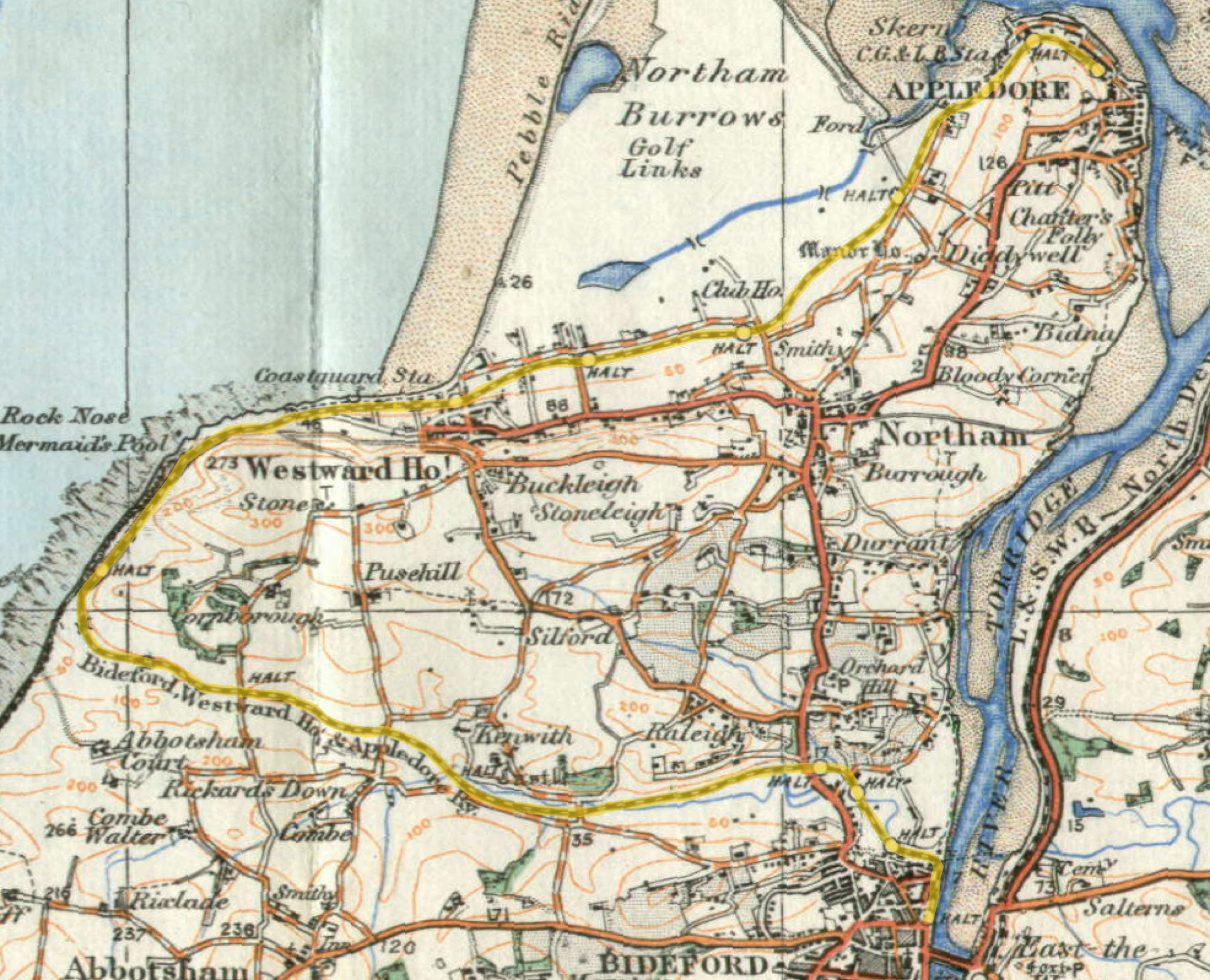
- Map showing the position of Kenwith Castle Halt

General information
- Location: Bideford, Torridge; England
- Coordinates: 51.0241°N 4.2379°W
- Grid reference: SS431273

Other information
- Status: Disused

History
- Original company: Bideford, Westward Ho! and Appledore Railway
- Pre-grouping: British Electric Traction

Key dates
- 20 May 1901: Opened
- 28 March 1917: Closed
Location

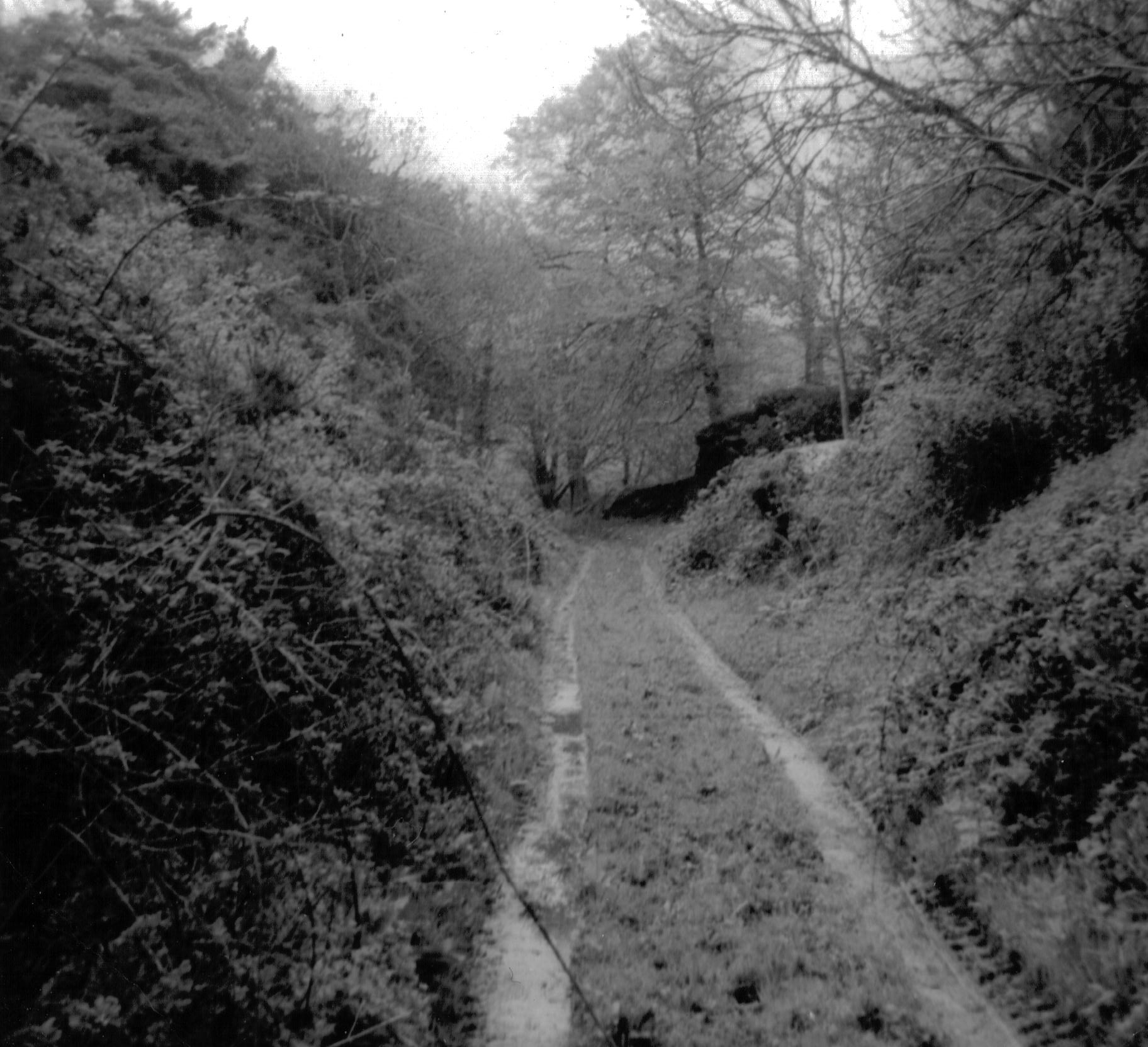
The old railway cutting from the site of the halt.

Kenwith Castle Halt was a minor railway station or halt/request stop in north Devon, close to Bideford, serving the nearby castle of that name. It lay 1 mile 75 chains (3.1 km) from Bideford Quay.

== History ==
This was to have been the site of the junction for a proposed line — the Bideford, Clovelly and Hartland Light Railway — running over ten miles to Clovelly.

=== Infrastructure ===
Kenwith Castle Halt had no platform or shelter and was sited at an ungated level crossing on the road to the castle; the gates had been removed in 1905. The line ran through a cutting at this point. No sidings or freight facilities were provided.

== Micro history ==
In January 1901, the first train, with one carriage, ran from Bideford to Northam carrying a few friends of the Directors.

Preceding station	Disused railways	Following station
Abbotsham Road; Line and station closed	Bideford, Westward Ho! and Appledore Railway	Causeway; Line and station closed
