= The Lane Halt railway station =

Disused railway station in Devon, England

The Lane Halt
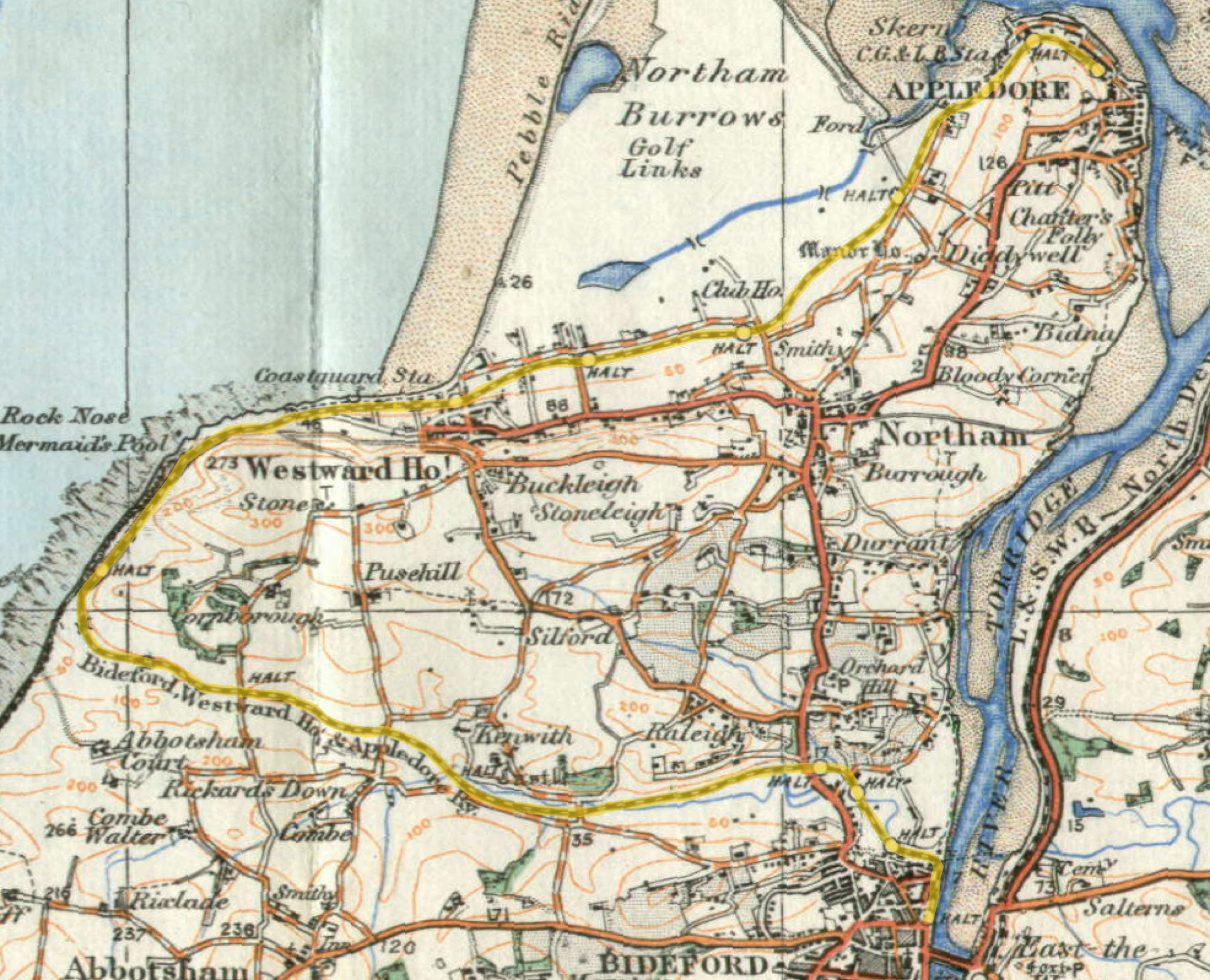
- Map showing the position of Causeway Crossing Halt

General information
- Location: Bideford, Torridge; England
- Coordinates: 51.024743°N 4.209023°W
- Grid reference: SS452272

Other information
- Status: Disused

History
- Original company: Bideford, Westward Ho! and Appledore Railway
- Pre-grouping: British Electric Traction

Key dates
- 20 May 1901: Opened
- 28 March 1917: Closed
Location

The Lane Halt or Chanters Lane was a minor railway station or halt/request stop in north Devon, close to Bideford, on the Bideford, Westward Ho! and Appledore Railway, serving the outskirts of the town. It lay 0 miles 55 chains (1.1 km) from Bideford Quay.

== History ==
The halt lay just beyond the "Yard" with its sidings, carriage shed and engine shed. The halt was only 13 chains (260 m) away from the Causeway Crossing Halt.

=== Infrastructure ===
The halt had no freight facilities. A platform 20 by 30 feet (6.1 m × 9.1 m) long was planned, 6 inches (15 cm) high and fenced at the back with no shelter. It is not clear if this facility was constructed. The level crossing was protected by semaphore signals. The up home signal at the Causeway Crossing Halt carried a fish-tailed distant signal that worked in conjunction with Chanters Lane's crossing home signal.

== Micro history ==
In January 1901, the first train, with one carriage, ran from Bideford to Northam carrying a few friends of the Directors.

Preceding station	Disused railways	Following station
Causeway Crossing; Line and station closed	Bideford, Westward Ho! and Appledore Railway	Strand Road; Line and station closed
