= Cornborough railway station =

Disused railway station in Devon, England

Cornborough
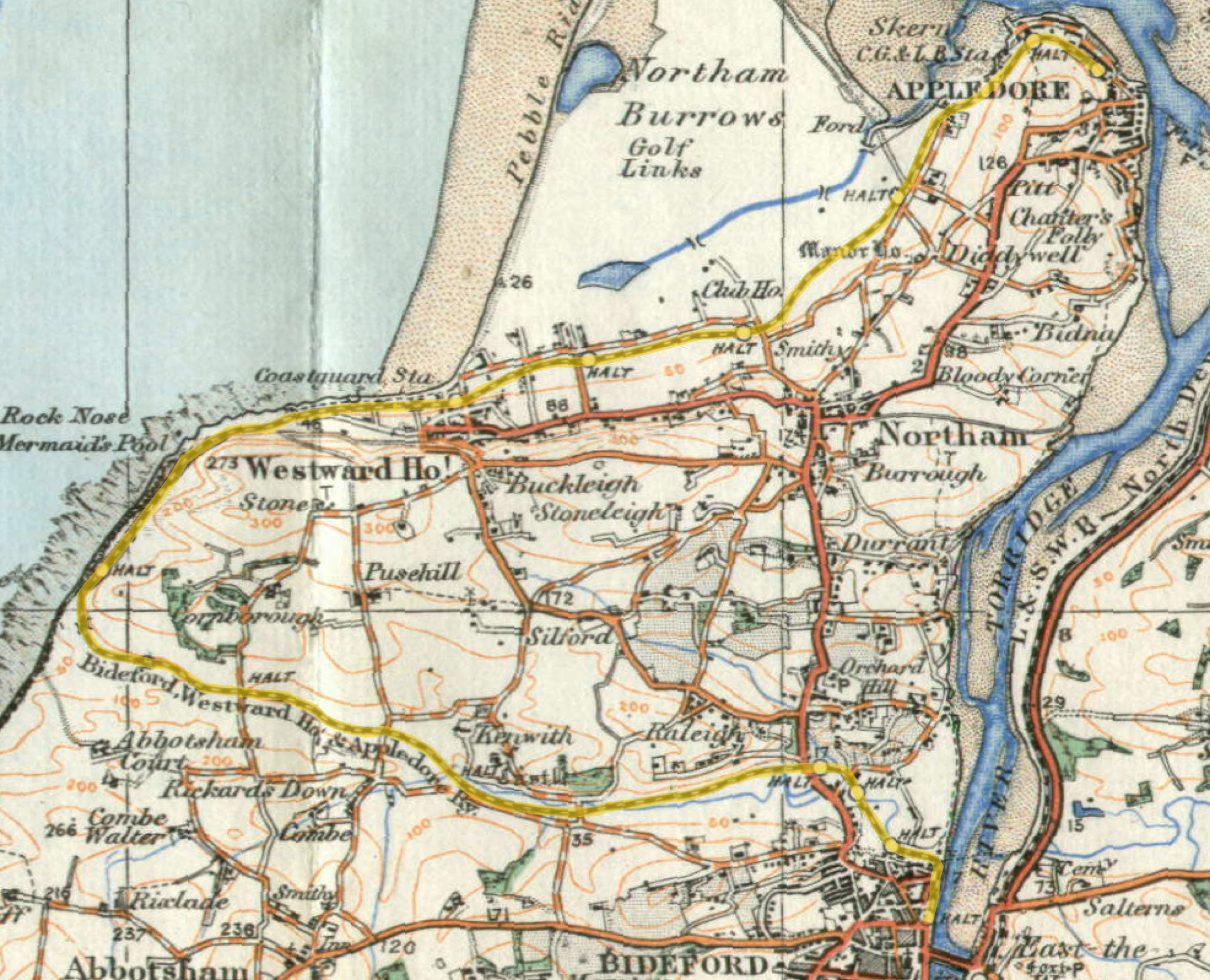
- Map showing the position of Cornborough

General information
- Location: Westward Ho!, Torridge; England
- Coordinates: 51.0326°N 4.2640°W
- Grid reference: SS413283
- Platforms: One

Other information
- Status: Disused

History
- Original company: Bideford, Westward Ho! and Appledore Railway
- Pre-grouping: British Electric Traction

Key dates
- 20 May 1901: Opened
- 28 March 1917: Closed
Location

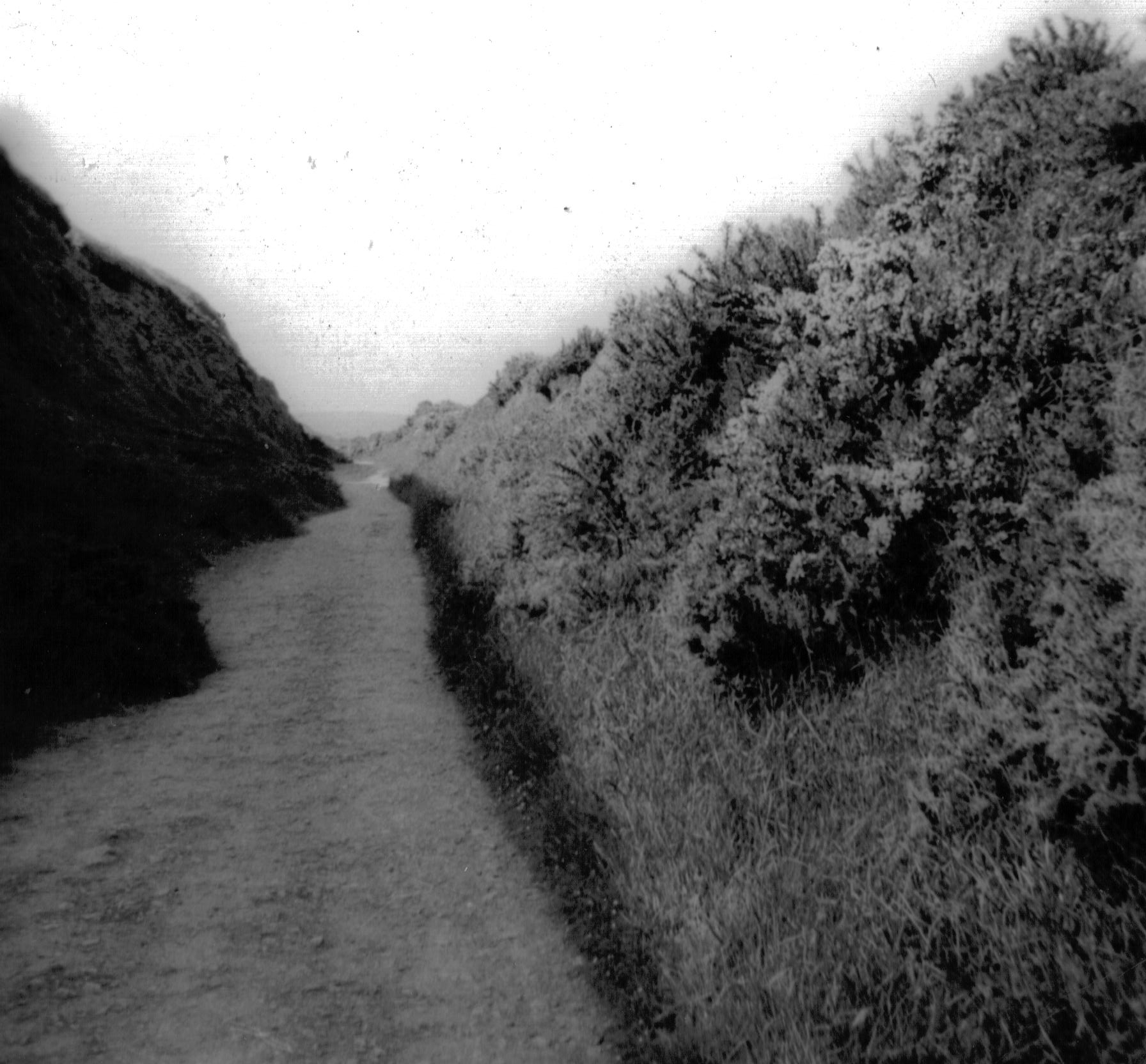
Old railway cutting near the site of the halt.

Cornborough railway station was a minor railway station or halt/request stop in north Devon, close to Westward Ho!, serving holiday makers visiting the cliff walks and nearby beach. It lay 3 miles 30 chains (5.4 km) from Bideford Quay.

== History ==
As stated, the halt was built to serve passengers aiming to walk on the Torrs, etc. It was in a very exposed area and trains were often reduced to a snail's pace due to high winds in winter.

=== Infrastructure ===
Cornborough Cliffs Halt had a platform, but no shelter and was sited on the up side of the line next to the footpath at the waters edge. The line ran through rock cut cuttings up to this point. No sidings or freight facilities were provided.

== Micro history ==
In January 1901, the first train, with one carriage, ran from Bideford to Northam carrying a few friends of the Directors.

Preceding station	Disused railways	Following station
Westward Ho! Line and station closed	Bideford, Westward Ho! and Appledore Railway	Abbotsham Road; Line and station closed
