= Westward Ho! railway station =

Disused railway station in Devon, England

Westward Ho!
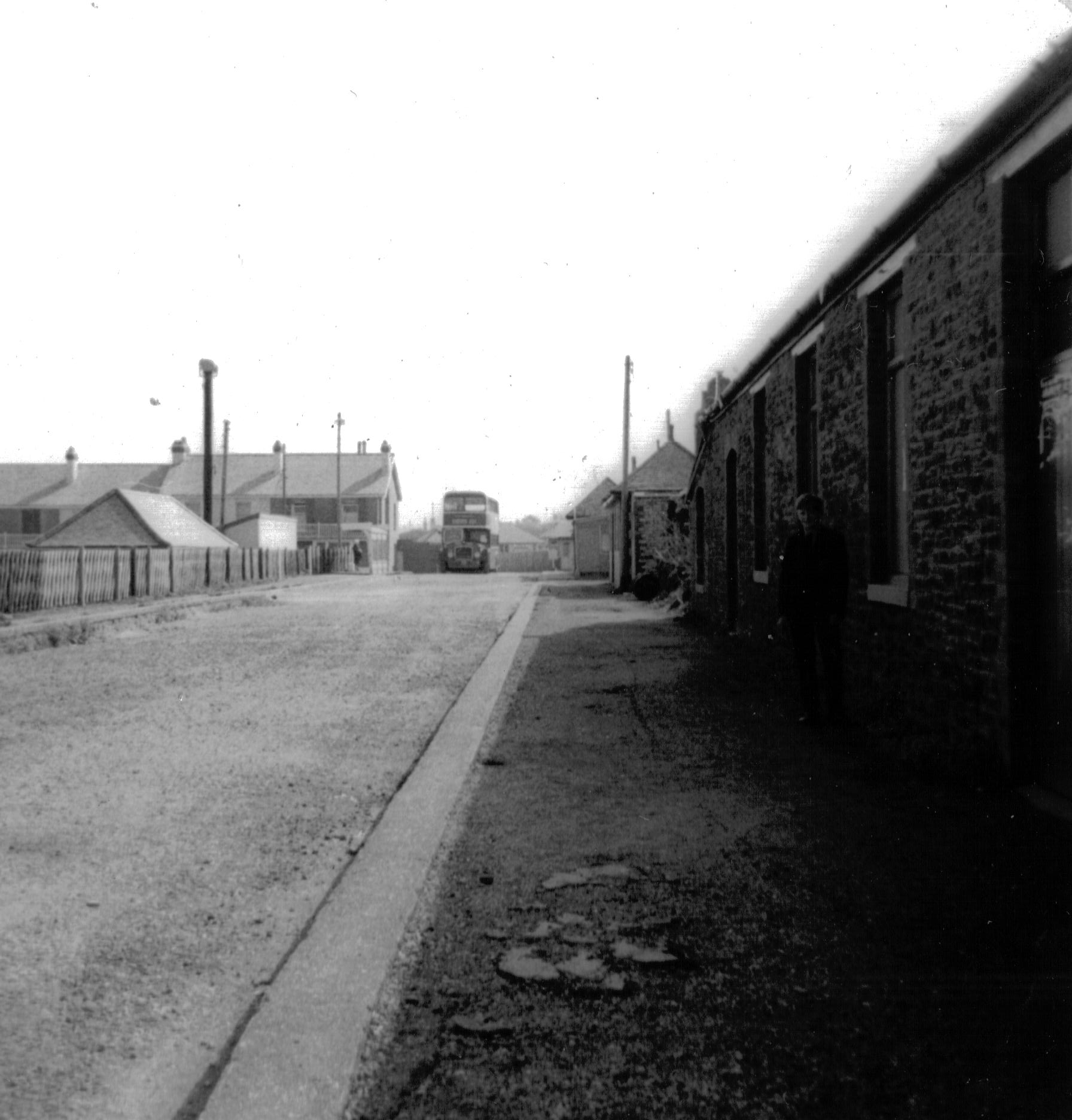
- The old station in 1969, used as a bus station

General information
- Location: Westward Ho!, Torridge; England
- Coordinates: 51.0402°N 4.2387°W
- Grid reference: SS431291
- Platforms: 2

Other information
- Status: Disused

History
- Original company: Bideford, Westward Ho! and Appledore Railway
- Pre-grouping: British Electric Traction

Key dates
- 20 May 1901: Opened
- 28 March 1917: Closed
Location

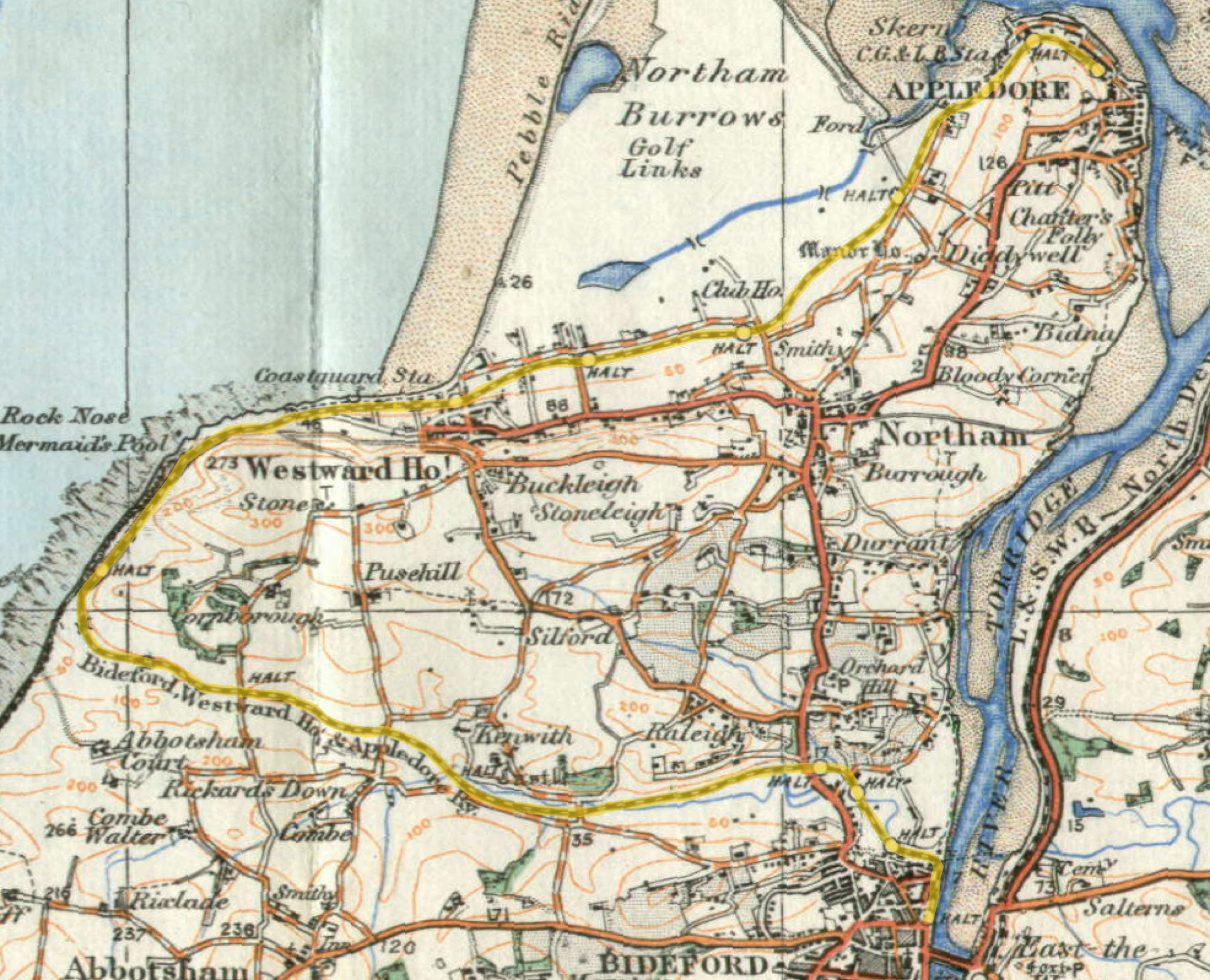
The route of the railway

Westward Ho! railway station was a railway station in north Devon, north-west of Bideford, serving the village of Westward Ho!; a tourist community within the parish of Bideford.

The village name comes from the title of Charles Kingsley's novel Westward Ho! (1855). The exclamation mark was therefore an intentional part of the station's name; the only station in the United Kingdom bearing an exclamation mark.

== History ==
This was the busiest station on the line and a Mr. John Loughlin was the station master; the signalman was a Mr.Spry. Mr. F.W.Galliford managed the refreshments room.

=== Infrastructure ===
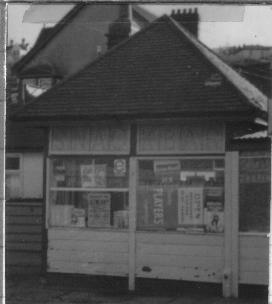
The old signal box in use as the Westward Ho! bus station snack bar

Westward Ho! had two platforms of 320 feet length and one foot above rail level, platform lighting, a passing loop of 8 chains allowing three coach trains to pass, a ticket office with waiting rooms and toilet, an 8-lever signal box and a 2-lever ground frame; a waiting room, refreshment room, bookstall, level crossing gates and a Concert Hall called the Station Hall. A siding ran to the Westward Ho! Gas Works. It was controlled by a two-lever ground frame, which was released by a key attached to the Westward Ho! to Appledore section of the train staff.

The loop was signalled with up home and down home, but no starters. At first only a signal box was present, with a long unbroken fence running along the back of the platforms and no other buildings or lighting. The other station buildings and facilities were probably added circa 1908. Crossing gates protected level crossings at both ends of the station.

The station was 4 miles 55 chains (7.5 km) from Bideford Quay.

In an effort to entice the public onto their trains and provide shelter during inclement weather, the company built a Concert or Reception Hall on the 'up' platform at Westward Ho! in 1901–02; it was called the Station Hall. Performers such as the 'Jolly Dutch' and Clog Dancers performed in Station Hall. It was an expensive undertaking, costing £17 9s 7d in 1906, under the heading of 'Services of Minstrels' in the traffic expenses log. The hall was built to attract local and tourist patronage and was fully licensed for music, dancing and the sale of alcohol. This hall was well built and still stood in 1980 as a 'Beer Garden'.

== Micro history ==
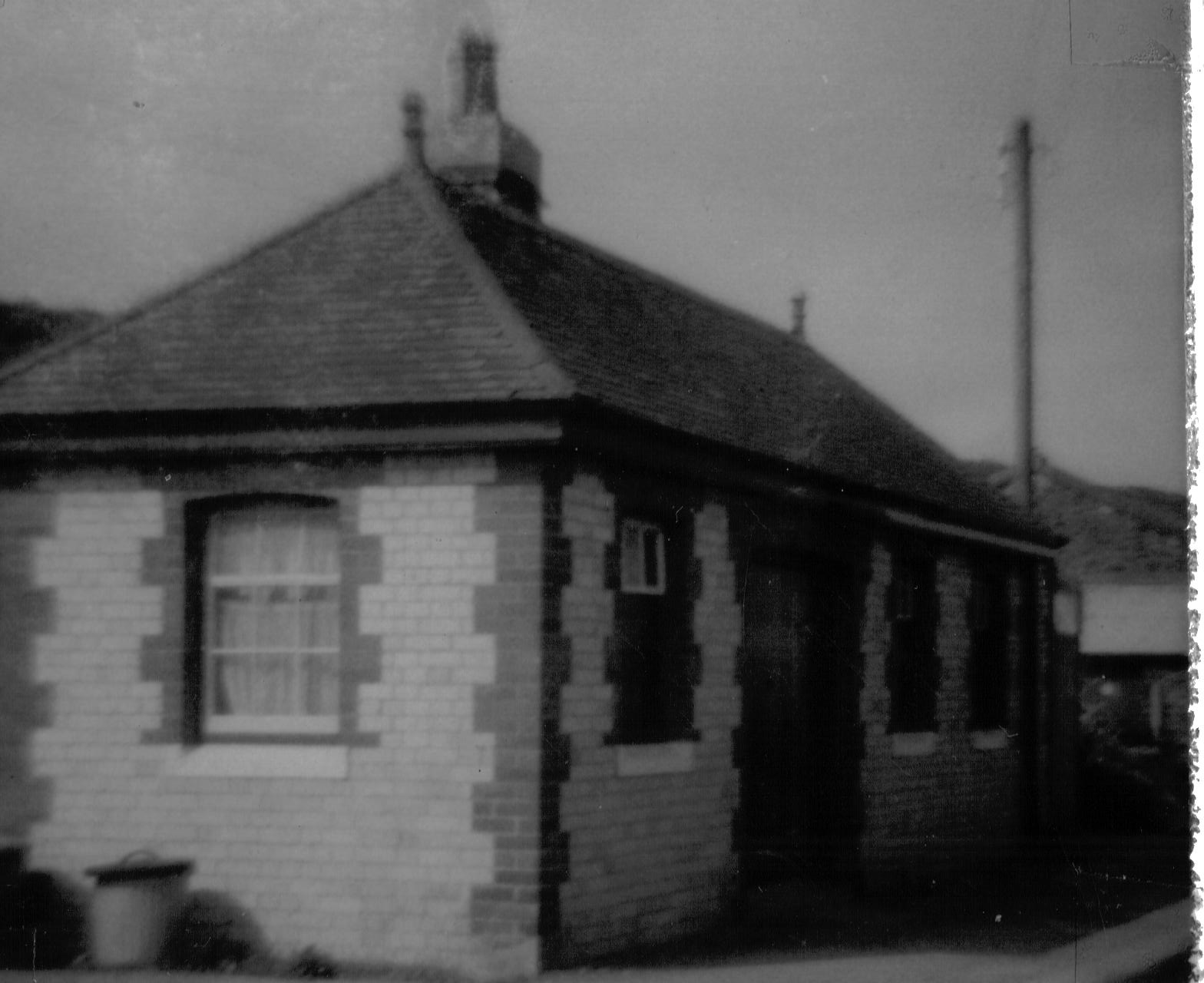
The old ticket office and waiting rooms.

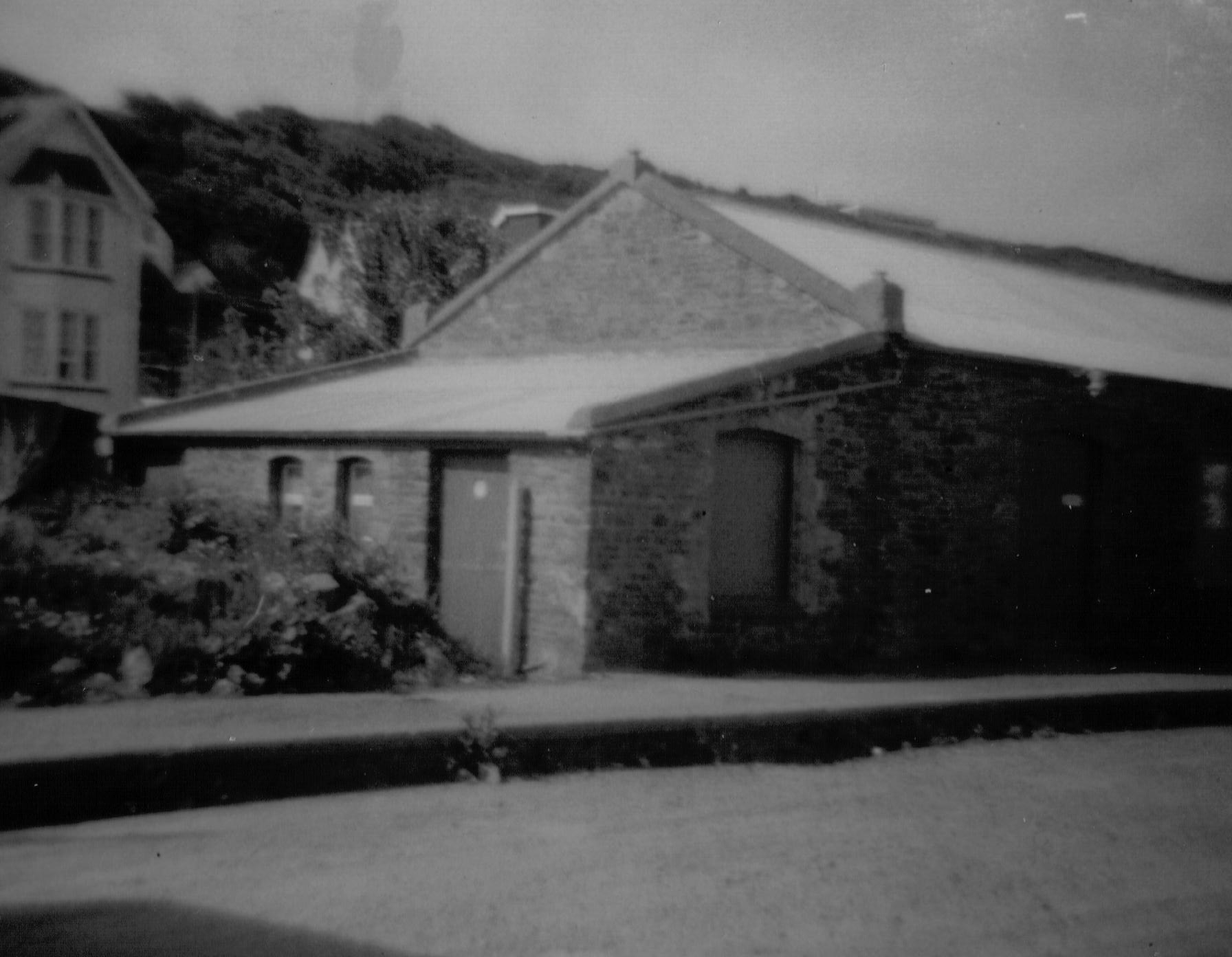
The old concert hall.

On 11 July 1901 a group of inmates from Bideford's local workhouse were carried free of charge to Westward Ho! for an outing.

Three young men were observed on Sunday, 4 August 1907 at Westward Ho! station, swearing and fighting. A train was due and Mr. Loughlin, stationmaster, asked them to desist and take care, upon which one of the men caught him round the neck and punched both of his cheeks. The man was fined by the Bideford Magistrates and told that he was lucky to get away with a fine of 10s and costs of 7s 6d.

The old trackbed is used as part of the South West Coast Path.

The old station trackbed was tarmaced and it was used in the 1960-80s as a bus station by Western National. The signal box became a snack bar; however by 2008 it had been demolished.

Preceding station	Disused railways	Following station
Beach Road; Line and station closed	Bideford, Westward Ho! and Appledore Railway	Cornborough; Line and station closed
