= The Rock Pool, Westward Ho! =

Tidal swimming pool in Devon, England

Coordinates: 51.0408°N 4.243104°W

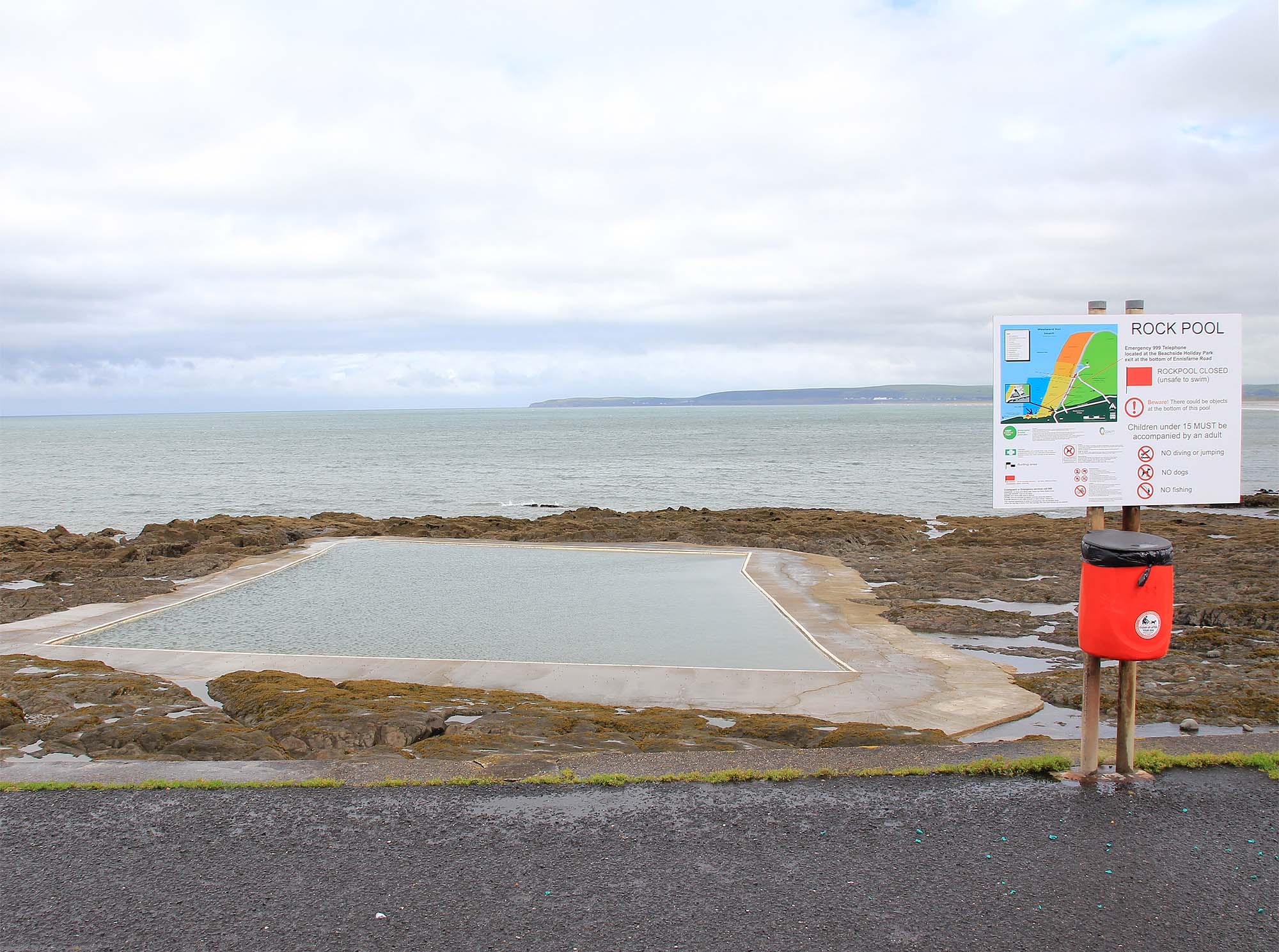
The Rock Pool

The Rock Pool at Westward Ho!, Bideford, Devon is a sea-water tidal swimming pool.

== History ==
Among the rocks on the southern end of Westward Ho! beach, this pool has been in existence for at least 120 years and was renovated in 2003. Depending on the tide, it can be murky.

== Description ==
The sea-pool is managed by Torridge District Council. The pool was closed in 2014 due to lack of funds to repair damage caused by storms, but re-opened in 2016 after receiving support from the Coastal Communities Fund. The 'Mermaids Pool' nearby, to the west, is a natural tidal pool which affords swimming at low tides.
