= Bideford, Westward Ho! and Appledore Railway =

Former railway in northwest Devon, England

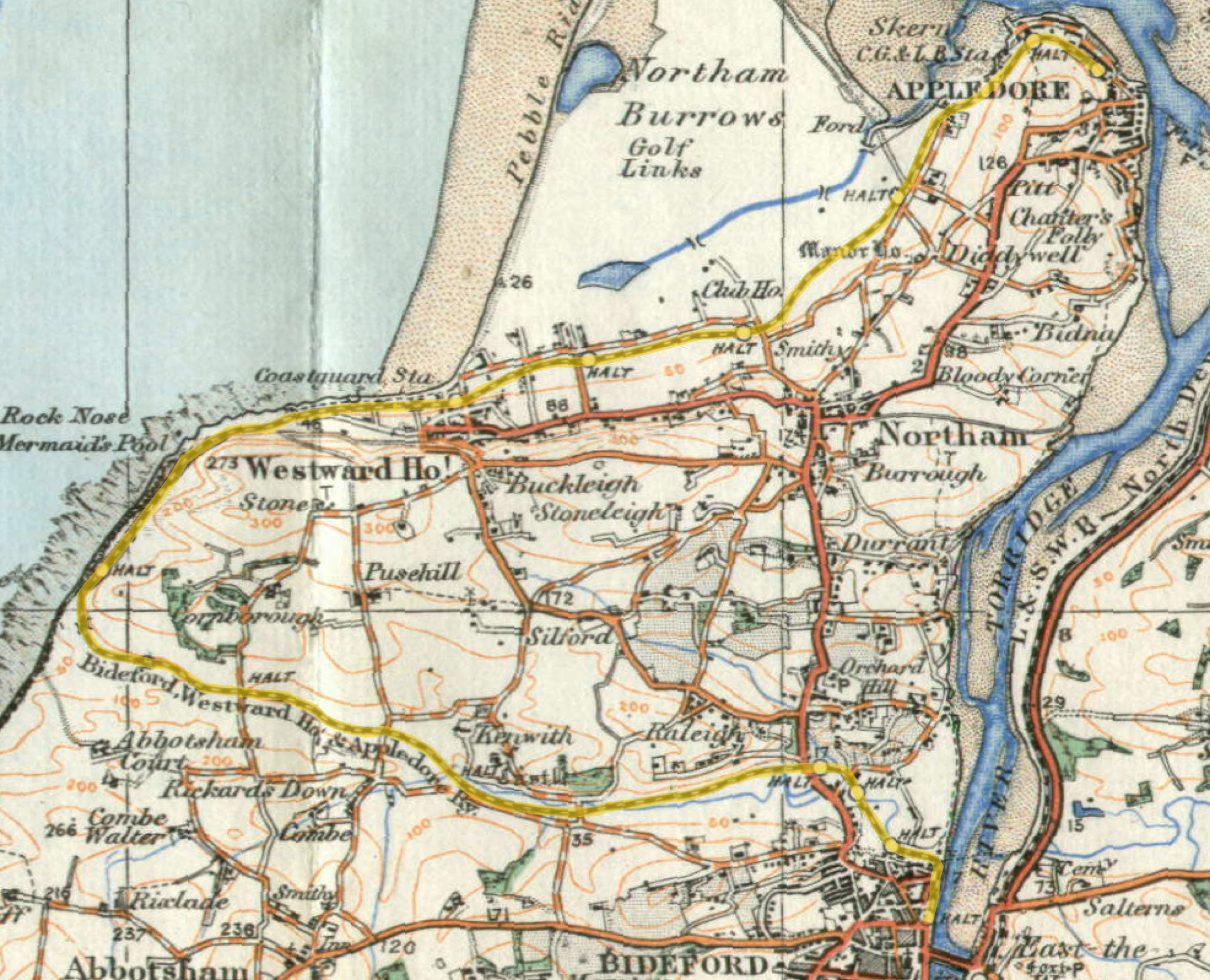
Map of the route, shown in yellow. Grid lines at two-mile (3 km) intervals, 50-foot (15 m) contours

The Bideford, Westward Ho! and Appledore Railway (BWH&AR) was a railway running in north west Devon, England. It is unusual in that although it was built as a standard gauge 4 ft 8 1/2 in (1,435 mm) line, it was not joined to the rest of the British railway network, despite the London and South Western Railway having a station at Bideford East-the-Water, just on the other side of the river Torridge from the main town. The line was wholly situated on the peninsula made up of Westward Ho!, Northam and Appledore with extensive sand dunes by the Torridge and Taw estuary.

The line opened in stages between 1901 and 1908, but closed in 1917, having been requisitioned by the War Office. Re-opening the line after World War I was considered, but dismissed as a viable option. The BWH&AR was the only railway company in the British Isles to have an exclamation mark in its company title.

Charles Kingsley wrote the novel Westward Ho!, which led to a tourist boom on the peninsula, followed by the construction of a new town called Westward Ho!. This is the only case of the publication of a novel that led to the construction of a town and then a railway to serve it. The Bideford Railway Heritage Centre at the old Bideford station has an interactive display covering the BWH&AR as well as some surviving artefacts.

== History ==
=== Construction and opening ===
A scheme for building this railway was suggested as early as 1860 with a bridge across the Torridge and stations at Northam, Appledore, Clovelly, Hartland and Bude. With the Bideford, Appledore, and Westward Ho' Railway Act 1866 (29 & 30 Vict. c. ccxxiv) a start was actually made on a line to run to Appledore with a branch to Westward Ho!, however soon after a full 'first sod cutting ceremony' by the Earl of Iddesleigh, the contractors went bankrupt and the project was abandoned. A project to create a 10 1/2 miles (16.9 km) branch from Abbotsham Road Station to Clovelly had been put forward by Messrs. Molesworth and Taylor.

Bideford, Westward Ho! and Appledore Railway Act 1896
- Act of Parliament
- Parliament of the United Kingdom
- Long title: An Act for incorporating the Bideford Westward Ho! and Appledore Railway Company and for other purposes.
- Citation: 59 & 60 Vict. c. xviii

Dates
- Royal assent: 21 May 1896

Text of statute as originally enacted

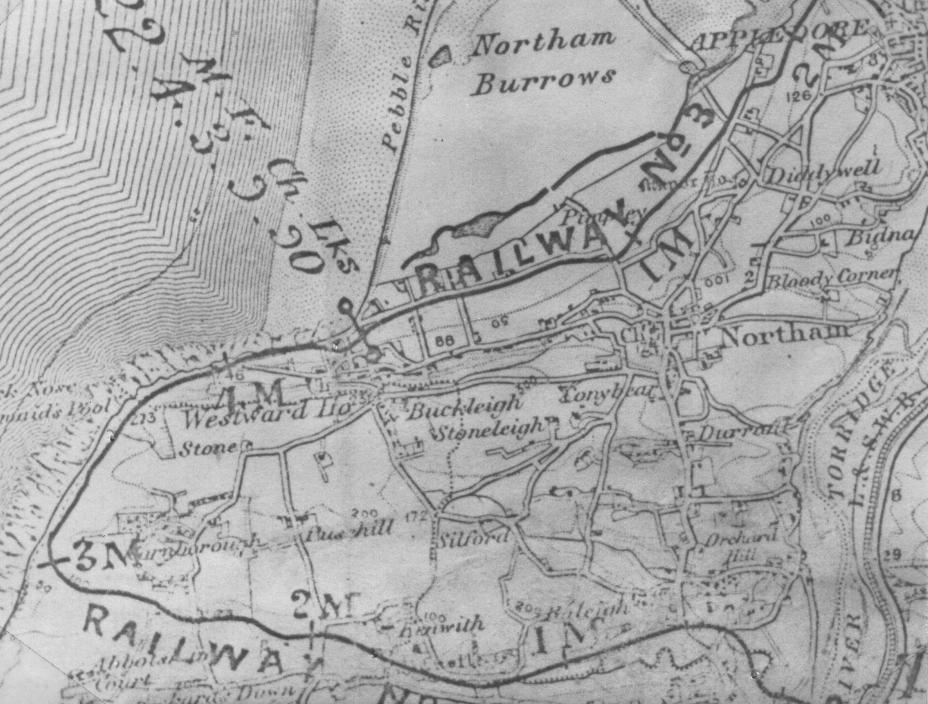
The route and construction sections

Finally the Bideford, Westward Ho! and Appledore Railway was incorporated on 21 May 1896 by the Bideford, Westward Ho! and Appledore Railway Act 1896 (59 & 60 Vict. c. xviii), with its head office address at the Electrical Federation Offices in Kingsway, London WC2. Soon after the line passed to the British Electric Traction Company (BET). It was not until 24 April 1901 that the single track line was opened as far as Northam, although the first trial train ran with a few friends of the directors in January 1901. The first train, pulled by Grenville was played off by Herr Groop's German Band which had been hired for the season and it reached speeds of 36 mph (58 km/h) on its inaugural run. The remaining extension to Appledore finally opened in 1908, on 1 May, costing £10,000.

The railway was built in three sections, with the first being from Bideford at 1 furlong, 9 chains and 50 links (0.39 km), the second from the termination of the first, being to Westward Ho!, length 4 miles (6.4 km), 3 furlongs, 9 chains and 50 links (7.23 km), and the third being from the termination of the second, to Appledore, length 2 miles (3.2 km), 3 furlongs and 4.2 chains (3.91 km). The contract for construction was awarded to Charles Shadwell of Blackburn and the estimate was for £50,000. The initial outlay was £87,208, but Shadwell was removed from his post on 13 December 1901. A subsequent court action proved that he did 'wilfully default' and judgment was given against him in 1905 for £7,500. Plans had been made for a 3 ft (0.91 m) gauge track, however as it was hoped to connect the line with the L&SWR by a bridge over the Torridge, the line was built to standard gauge. Gradients were severe in places, with a 1 in 47 (112 ft/mi) on the Kenwith Castle to Abbotsham Road section.

The rails were delivered by boat to Bideford Quay by the SS Snipe in May 1898 and the sleepers also arrived at the quay, coming from West Hartlepool in September. Wood blocks were used on the quay, flush with the road surface to deaden the noise, as was the practice on roads with heavy horse and cart traffic in many places. The wood became very slippery and caused accidents in wet weather, the company not always being as careful with the application of sand and gravel as it should have been.

The company filled in and culverted the stream coming down from Kenwith Castle, creating reclaimed land and preventing the high tides flowing up to the castle. The council had designs on this 'new land' and complained that the railway did not skirt the edge to release the land for other purposes.

== Operation of the railway ==
The coaches could each carry about 60 people, with two or three on each seat. The maximum speed was about 40 mph (64 km/h), however the streets section had a 4 mph (6.4 km/h) speed limit. Trains could run at around 30 mph (48 km/h) on many sections of the track, however winter storms could slow the trains to little more than a walking pace. Trains were usually two carriages length, except during the winter timetable when one was more than sufficient; however four carriage trains which could therefore carry as many as two hundred people were sometimes run. A large collar factory at the Strand, Bideford, was responsible for a lot of traffic in the mornings and evenings. In its first six months the line carried 8,552 passengers and in May 1901 consideration was given to purchasing more carriages. The total for 1901 had been 110,647. In August 1908, some of the trains were so well patronised that some passengers had to ride on the steps. Visits from the Devon Hussars Yeomanry to Westward Ho! for several weeks' encampment at Commons Farm added significantly to takings.

=== The passenger timetable ===
The company made it very clear that published timetables were only to indicate the times before which a train would not depart and the specified times for each stop were only given as a rough guide. Trains normally made three regular and eight conditional stops, but 'expresses' did run which did not stop between Bideford and Westward Ho!. With two engines in steam the frequency could be every half-hour, but a train every hour or so was the norm in summer, normally taking about 20 minutes from Bideford to Northam or 15 minutes for the 'express'. Fifteen trains ran in each direction in the July 1906 Bideford to Northam timetable and lighter service of four ran on Sundays. The 1910 Bradshaw's Timetable shows trains taking 30 minutes for the journey from Bideford to Appledore, 10 trains in each direction, with an extra run on market days (Tuesdays and Saturdays) and no trains on Sundays. The winter timetable for 1 November 1917 to 30 April 1918, which was destined never to be used, was down to seven trains in each direction and no Sunday service. Horse-drawn buses ran from Westward Ho! to Clovelly and through tickets were issued from Instow to cover the journey by ferry, railway and road transport. The bus service cost £51 18s 0d (£51.90) to run for the six months ending 31 December 1906.

=== Passenger, parcel and baggage fares ===
In 1905 the Bideford to Westward Ho! or Northam fare was 3d for first class single, 4d return and a third class single was 2d, 3d return. Dogs cost 3d each and bicycles 6d or 1s if not accompanied. Parcels were 1d up to 7 lb (3.2 kg), 3d up to 14 lb (6.4 kg) and 4d up to 28 lb (13 kg). A third class from Bideford to Appledore cost 8d. Market day tickets for Tuesdays and Saturdays were only 6d and an augmented train service ran. Bathing returns could be purchased and books of tickets for 10 journeys cost 3s 4d. Company regulations covered every conceivable type of carriage, such as 1s for a bitch or a litter of puppies in a hamper or 2s 6d for a harp in or out of a case. Return tickets admitted the holder to the Great Nassau Baths at Westward Ho! for only 4d. Tickets were made of paper, with a combination of the names of the boarding and alighting points printed in a double column on either side of the value.

== Stations, halts and track layout ==
Trains started from Bideford Quay on their scenic journey across the peninsula to the cliffs at Cornborough and Westward Ho!, then over the fields close to Northam Burrows, finally coming to the terminus at the port of Appledore, with its shipyards and maritime traditions.

The line was seven miles (11 km) in length when fully opened in 1908. There were 11 stations and halts which largely served visitors wishing to enjoy the bracing air along the coastline, or to swim in the clear waters.

After Bideford (Quay) was a halt at Bideford (Strand Road) Halt, which was close to the yard containing the principal engine, carriage, and maintenance sheds. Chanter's Lane Halt or The Lane Halt was next, followed by The Causeway Halt, which had a two-storey traditional signal box built by order of the Board of Trade which had inspected the line a month after it opened. Following on from these were Kenwith Castle Halt, Abbotsham Road Station, Cornborough Cliffs Halt with its wooden platform, Westward Ho! Station, Beach Road Halt, Northam Station (Pimpley Road) with a platform and waiting room, Richmond Road Halt with a level crossing, platform and shelter, Lovers Lane Halt with a platform and finally Appledore Station, which lay close to the Anglican church.

The railway seems to have lacked stock-proof fencing in places, clearly indicated in a postcard of a scene near Chanter's Lane. Presumably the light railway order, low speeds and cow catchers on the locomotives made this unnecessary on some parts of the line. On the same postcard the railway is mistakenly called the Bideford, Chanter's Lane, Westward Ho! and Appledore Railway. Substantial wood fencing is present at other sites in surviving photographs.

=== Bideford Quay Station and Strand Road Halt ===
Bideford Quay had a coal siding and eventually a loop, but no platforms and therefore carriages were fitted with steps that reached almost to ground level. It had benches on the quay side, the manager's office, a booking office and a waiting room, with an exterior clock saying "Train leaves for Westward Ho!, Northam and Appledore". Bideford (Strand Road) had a signal hut.

=== Abbotsham Road Station ===
Abbotsham Road, previously named Mudcott, was in open countryside with Mudcott Road having a level crossing across it. It had a passing loop, two wooden platforms and what appears to have been a combined ticket office and signal box hut. It was well equipped for its remote setting and lack of obvious patronage.

=== Westward Ho! Station ===
Westward Ho!, the busiest station, had its own station master, Mr. MacLaughlan; it had two platforms, platform lighting, a passing loop, ticket office, an eight-lever signal box and a two-lever ground frame operated by Mr. Spry; a waiting room, refreshment room, bookstall, level crossing gates and a concert hall called the Station Hall. A siding ran to the Westward Ho! gas works. An early photograph shows Westward Ho! with only the signal box and a long unbroken fence running along the back of the platforms with no other buildings or lighting. The similarity in appearance and construction between the Westward Ho! and Appledore platform buildings suggests that they were both built at the same time, circa 1908.

In an effort to entice the public onto their trains and provide shelter during inclement weather, the company built a concert or reception hall on the 'up' platform at Westward Ho! in 1901 / 02; it was called the Station Hall. Performers such as the Jolly Dutch and clog dancers performed there. It was an expensive undertaking, costing £17 9s 7d in 1906, under the heading of "Services of minstrels" in the traffic expenses log. The building was well built and still stood in 1980 as a beer garden.

=== Appledore Station ===
Appledore had its own station master, Mr. H R Moody; a run-round loop, one platform, platform lighting, a ticket office, signal box hut and a small engine shed, a water tower, footbridge and a fuel store siding.

== Locomotives ==
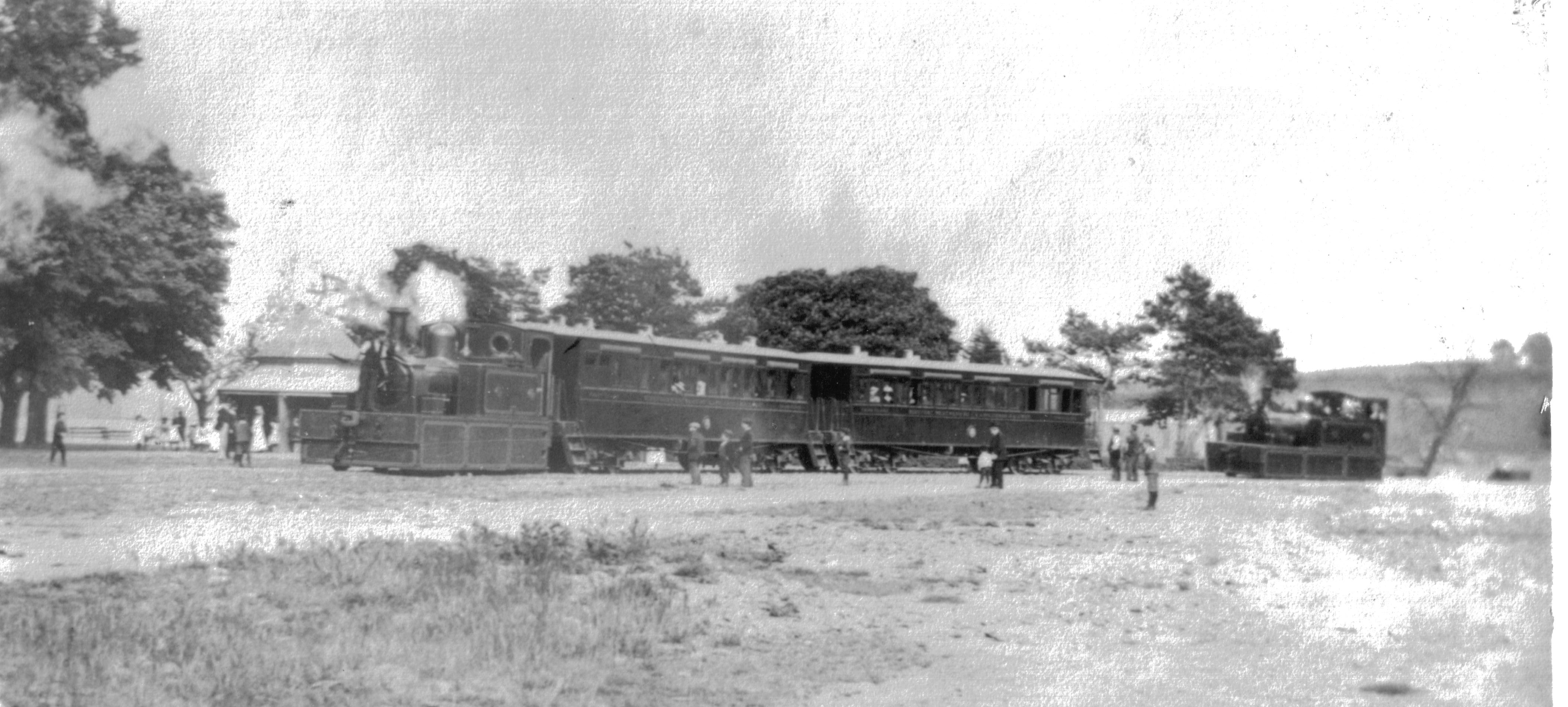
Two locomotives at Bideford quay, circa 1905.

Three 2-4-2 side tank engines built by Hunslet Engine Co. Ltd. of Leeds provided the motive power and they were named Grenville (works number 713), Kingsley (works number 714) and Torridge (works number 715). Protective plates or skirts were attached for safety whilst running through the streets section and a form of cow-catcher was fixed to the front at a later date. One engine, Torridge was put on the track facing Bideford and the other two, Kingsley and Grenville, faced Appledore. The line had no turntable.

The driving wheels were of 3 ft 3 in (990 mm) diameter and the locomotives weighed 27 long tons (27 t) in full working order, capable of pulling about 95 tons (97 t) on a minimum curve of 160 feet (49 m). The 12 inches (300 mm) diameter cylinders had a piston stroke of 18 inches (460 mm) at a working pressure of 140 pounds per square inch (965 kPa). Five hundred imperial gallons (2,270 litres) of water and 18 cwt (910 kg) of coal could be carried. The engine produced 6,978 pounds (31.04 kN) of tractive effort at 75% of maximum boiler pressure. The heating surface was 444 sq ft (41.2 m^{2}) and the engine and coaches had a single automatic vacuum brake. The total wheelbase was 16 ft 6 in (5.03 m), and the coupled wheelbase 5 ft 0 in (1.52 m).

The locomotives were originally black, then repainted green, then repainted cherry red and finally painted black again due to wartime regulations. The dome and safety valve were polished brass. The green livery had the chimney black and lining in yellow or off white applied to the side tanks, cab sides, cab rear and wheel skirting.

Coal was stored at a linhay (a lean-to shed with an open front) which stood opposite the company's engine and carriage sheds. It was originally carried across from Bideford L&SWR station on horse carts and tipped into railway wagons.

The locomotive shed was capable of holding four locomotives and held an inspection pit. Steam and smoke was carried away from the inside of the shed by a system of wooden troughs hanging suspended from the roof over the centre of the tracks and leading, sloping upwards, to wooden chimneys. The fumes would otherwise erode the iron roof supports.

== Rolling stock ==
=== Carriages ===
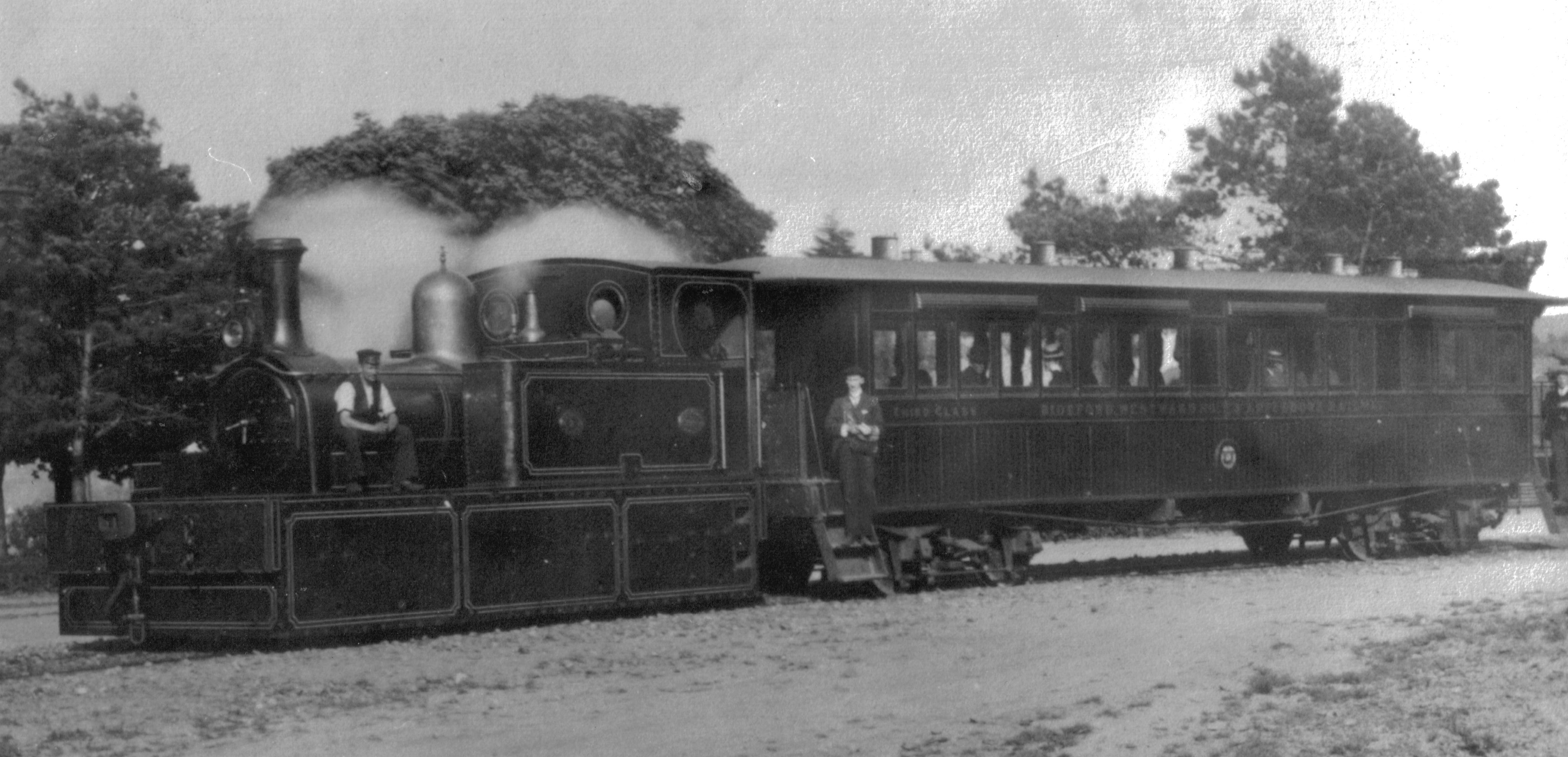
A train at Bideford Quay.

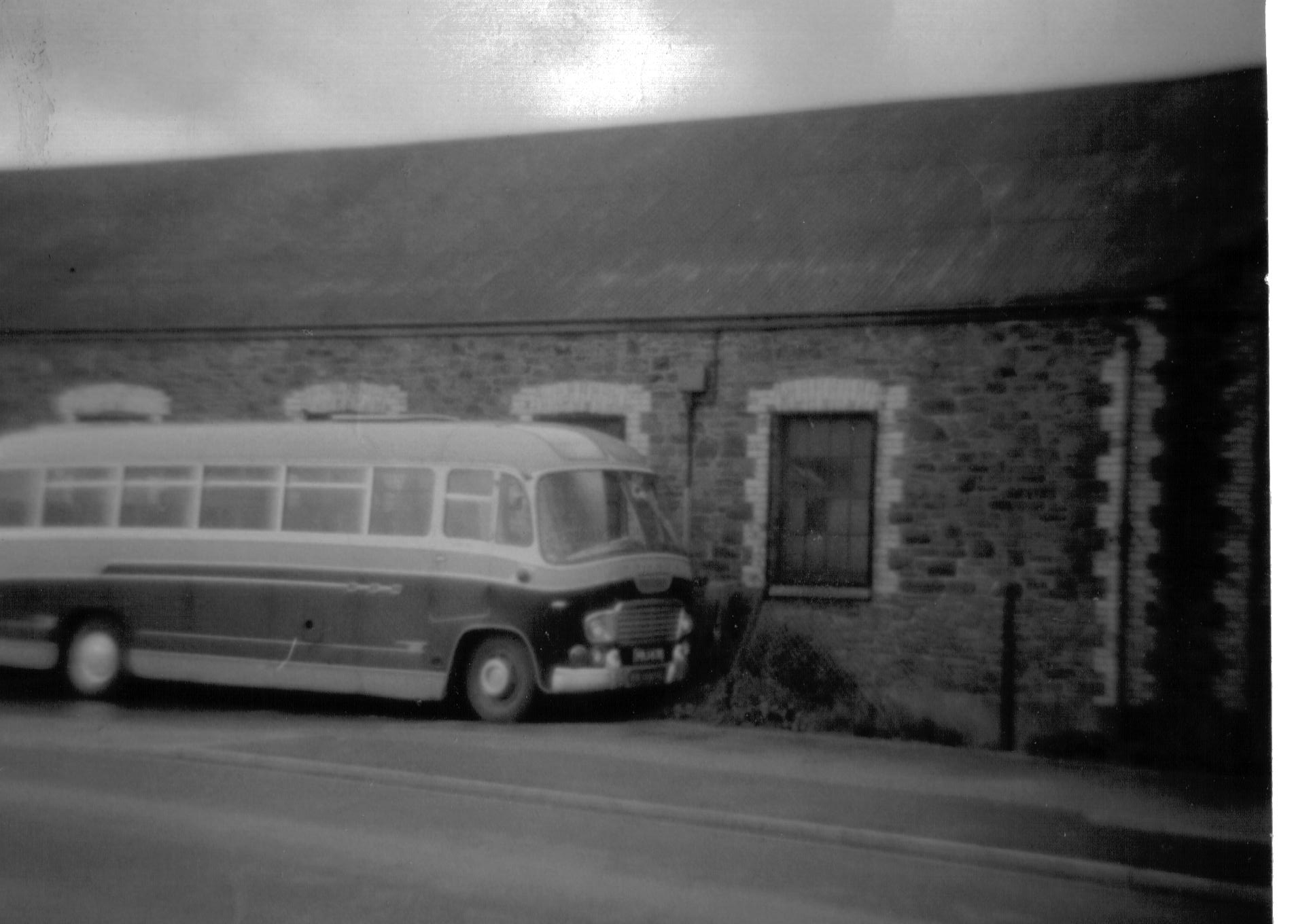
The old carriage shed at Bideford.

The bogie carriages were distinctive and American in style. The six were built by the Bristol Wagon & Carriage Works, two as 60-foot-long (18 m) third class (one also being a thirdbrake) and four as 40-foot-long (12 m) composites for 40 third and 10 first class passengers. The carriages were exceptionally wide compared with those used by major railway companies and this led to increased congestion for non-railway traffic when trains were at Bideford Quay. Entry was from either end by a metal fenced platform with steep steps. Later the open ends of these carriages were totally enclosed against the elements. Lighting was by acetylene gas, with ventilators above. Each carriage had its own clock. The seats could be turned around and the carriages had a central gangway. Third class seats were upholstered with 'rep' and first class with 'American' leather. They had a polished teak exterior with the name of the company in full beneath the windows, and the arms of Bideford as a medallion on the side. Buffer beams and shanks were bright red. Interiors were of polished oak, with teak mouldings and the ceilings of the first class sections were covered in pale green Lincrusta, picked out with gold leaf. In August 1900 the carriages had been delivered, crossing Bideford Bridge with wheels and springs being taken over first and the bodies after.

When bathing huts were being built in Westward Ho!, one of the old railway coaches which had been left there was purchased by a farmer called Mr. Beer, who used it as a grain store on his farm at Home Farm, Monkleigh and it was still being used by his sons in 1969. This carriage had at some point been cut in half and the whereabouts of the other half is unknown.

=== Other stock ===
All stock had a single buffer. The railway also had six open plank wagons with centrally placed drop-down doors on either side, four covered wagons and a brake van for passenger and goods use, which had sliding doors with the company initials on them. The goods wagons had BWH on one side and AR on the other, second plank from the top.

== Signalling ==
The railway came under a Light Railway Order once the Appledore section was opened and this simplified the requirements for the signaling, especially as five of the crossings were controlled by gatemen and did not have crossing gates. The signalling was installed by the company Saxby and Farmer. There were no ordinary 'starters' or 'distants', but what might be termed 'homes' of ordinary semaphore type, used at a number of places on the line. Commencing from the Bideford end, signals in both directions marked the point at which the line passed from open street sections onto the British Electric Traction Company property. A further signal with a side arm controlled entry to the yard and the road crossing beyond. Causeway and its level crossing were guarded by signals on both approaches. From The Causeway, guarded by Mr. Blackmore, the line ran onwards to the station and passing loop at Abbotsham Road, which had a miniature semaphore watching over the roadway and the level crossing north of the station, with a full-size semaphore controlling the passing loop and train entry. Appledore had a small arm on the semaphore signal covering the siding points. For a time a man with a red flag rode on the front of the locomotive whilst it passed through the streets of Bideford. Signal boxes were located at The Causeway Crossing, operated by Mr. Furzy and Westward Ho! operated by Mr. Spry, with signal box huts at The Strand, Abbotsham Road and Appledore.

== Railway employees ==
The company had around 21 staff, seven of whom served as gatemen at the level crossings.

In Irsha Street, Appledore, there was in 1965 a public house called The Rising Sun and beforehand it had been the residence of Mr. H. R. Moody, the station master at Appledore. Mr. Dicker, who lived in Bideford in 1968, was one of the company workmen, based at the locomotive sheds at Bideford. Mr. Henry Sowden was the railway company manager in 1917; he had been the superintendent from 1910 to 1914.

The train drivers were Mr. F. Palmer, Mr. Shephard and Mr. Hawkins. The latter two were retired Southern Railway Express engine drivers. One of the firemen was a Mr. Harris, who was also an engineer. Other firemen were Alfie Curtis and Mr. F. Bucker. Mr. Spry worked the Westward Ho! signal box. Mr. Blackmore was in charge of Chanter's Lane Halt and the signal box at The Causeway was worked by Mr. Furzy. Mr. MacLaughlan was the station master at Westward Ho!, the busiest station on the line. Track men were Jack Shears, who lived in Northam and Ned Kelly. Salaries and wages were high because of the need for gatekeepers, etc., coming to £256 4s 0d for a six months period in 1906.

== Decline, closure and disposal ==
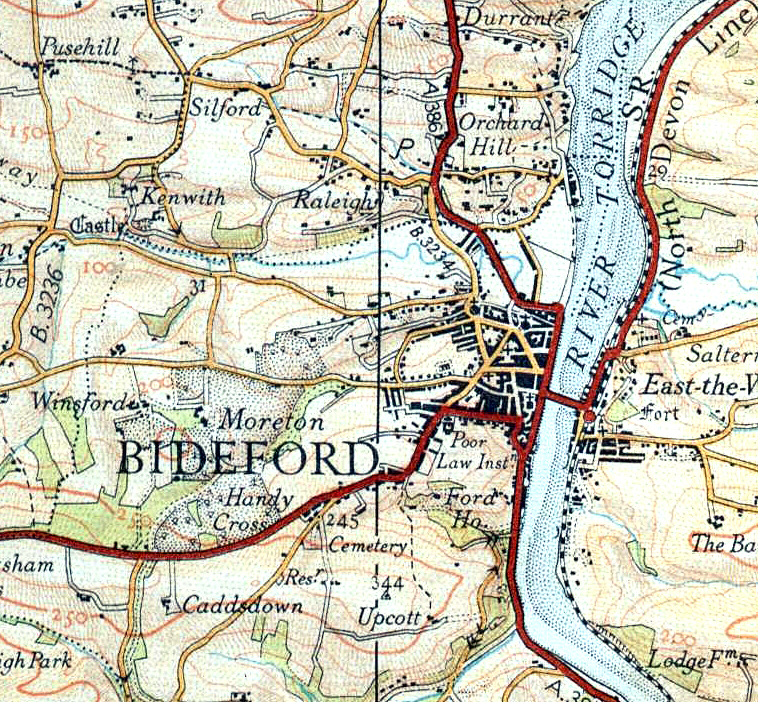
Bideford with the course of the old railway past Kenwith Castle

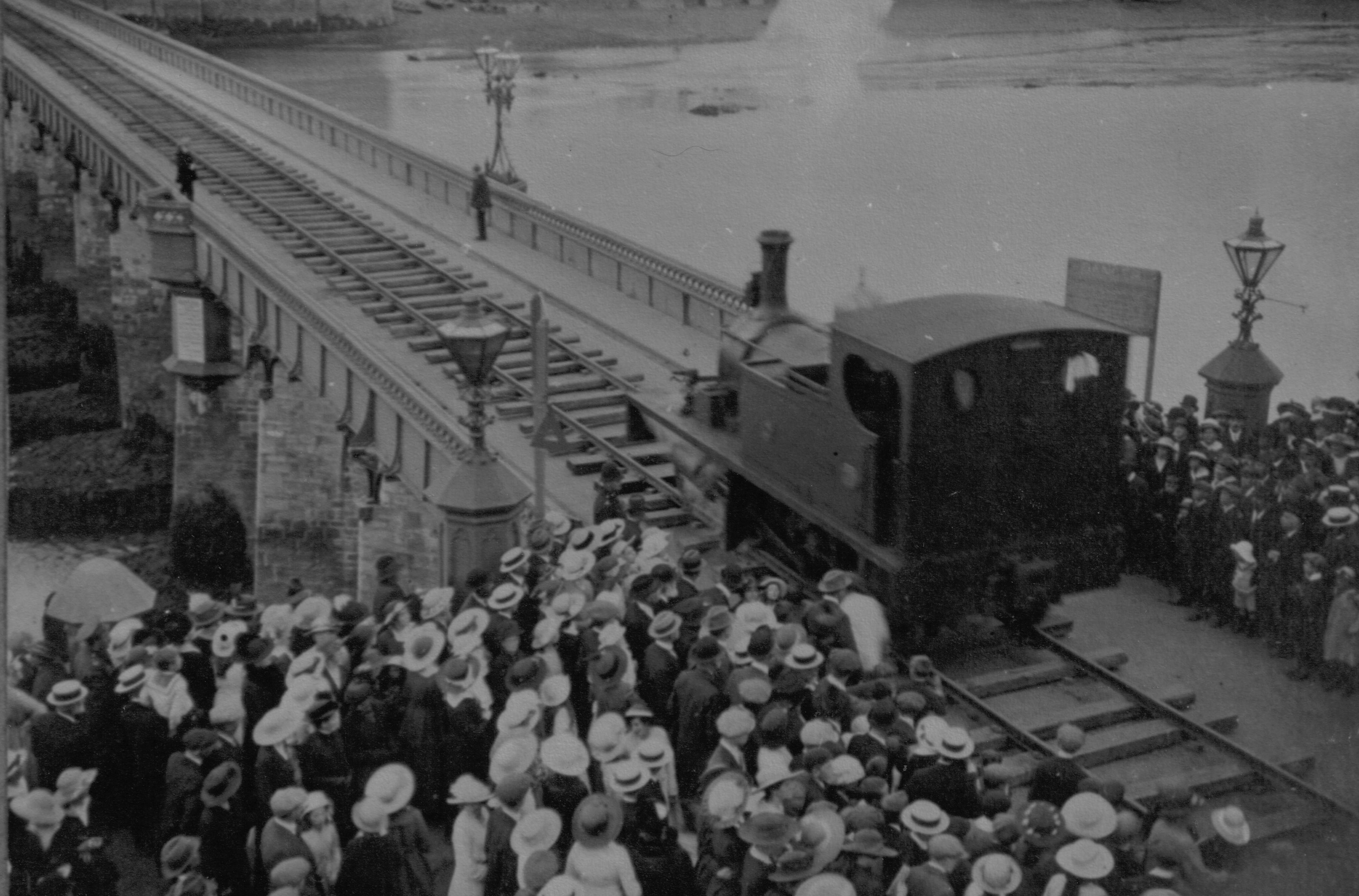
A BWH&R locomotive crossing Bideford Bridge in 1917.

The line was never on a firm financial footing and the situation worsened with the rising cost of coal and the effects of the First World War; additionally competition from Dymond's horse-drawn coach and later motor buses took much of the traffic off the line even in summer. Few passengers from Bideford Station at East-The-Water would trouble to change again for the BWH&AR at the quay when alternative transport would take them straight to their destination for less money. Trains did not run at times suitable for manual workers and freight, apart from Westward Ho! gasworks, had always been a minor consideration. The line could not even manage the 0.5% dividend of the Lynton & Barnstaple Railway and eventual closure was inevitable. In 1917, the Minister of Munitions requisitioned the line for war service and it duly closed on 28 March of that year. Grenville and Torridge were loaded onto the captured German freighter Gotterdammerung for duty in France, but the ship was torpedoed off the north Cornwall coast and sank. The wreck was discovered in 2001 and the locomotives may be recovered for restoration as static displays. Kingsley was scrapped in 1937 after having been sold by the Ministry of Munitions to the National Smelting Company. The locomotives, derailing several times, had to be run across the medieval Bideford Bridge on temporarily laid track, then running along Barnstaple Street joining up with the old L.& S.W.R.line at Bideford's goods yard. The operation took two days to complete. Their iron side protectors or skirts were removed to reduce the weight of the locomotives.

On 29 April 1921 Blackmore's held an auction at the works yard in Bideford and sold the six carriages and also possibly the trackbed in separate lots. One carriage was cut in half and used on the beach at Westward Ho! near Nassau Baths as beach huts, whilst the others were taken to the Midlands for scrap. Some of the line's equipment was purchased for further use by Colonel H. F. Stephens, through his company Associated Railways. The fate of the signal boxes is unclear (see Bits and Pieces), however the Westward Ho! box was still being used as sweet shop on its original site as late as 1970.

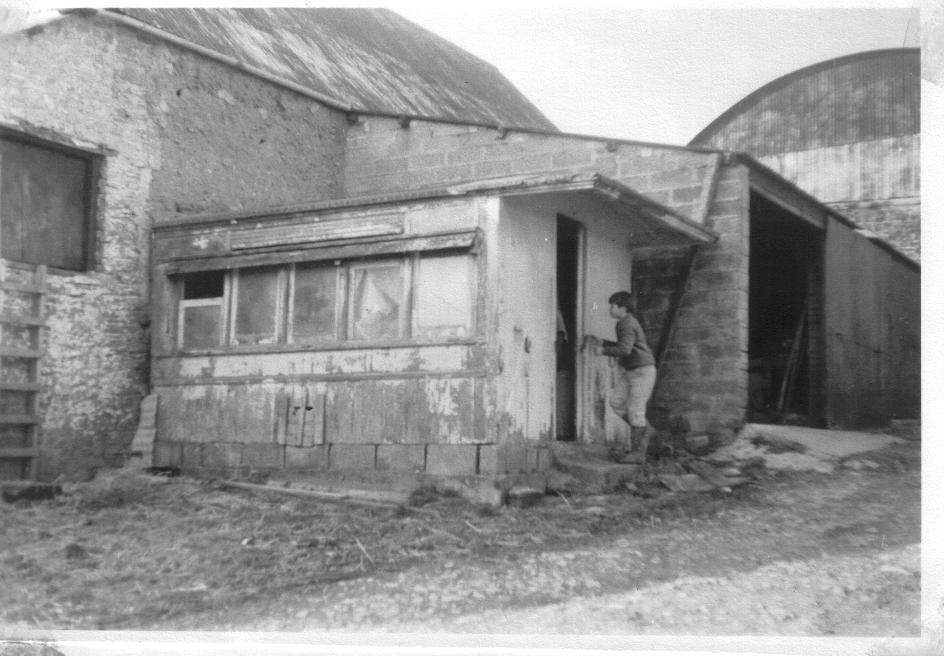
A section of a carriage which had been used as beach hut at Westward Ho!, close to the Nassau Baths being inspected by Roger Griffith from Grenville College in the 1960s

A set of crossing gates, believed to have originated from the BWH&AR, were in use at Pilton in the latter years of the Lynton and Barnstaple Railway (1898–1935). As the L&B was narrow gauge, and the trackbed very narrow at this point, the gates overlapped when open to road traffic. These gates are now owned by the L&B and in storage awaiting restoration.

Westward Ho! did not completely vanish from the railway scene as an ex-Southern Railway West Country class locomotive, number 34036, was named Westward Ho!.

== Walking the old trackbed in 1970 ==
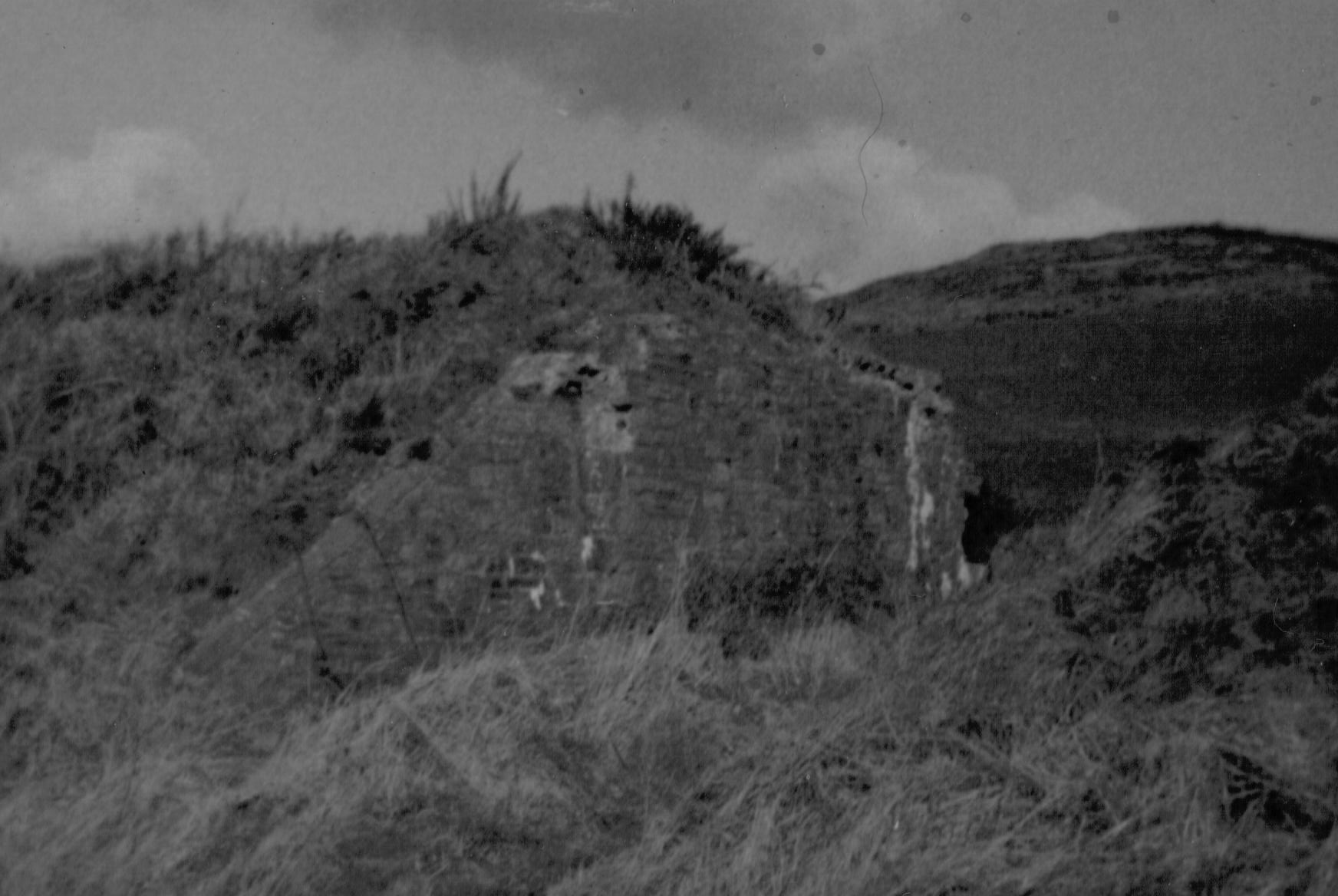
The abutment of an old bridge on the embankment at Cornborough Cliffs.

Substantial cuttings and embankments, together with railway buildings remained. The carriage shed at Bideford was modified for buses by the Southern Bus Company. The locomotive sheds were in use by a local dairy. By August 2008 the former locomotive sheds had been demolished although at that time they were still visible on Google Earth. The former carriage sheds however remain.

The gatekeeper's cottage at The Causeway was well maintained, but there was no sign of the existence of the signal box, although a piece of rail was in place as a gate stop and some railway sleepers were being used a gate posts which could possibly have come from the railway. A level crossing gate concrete post survived at Chanter's Lane. A bridge with brick sides and iron girders existed near Kenwith Castle, together with signs of a low embankment and a cutting running through solid rock.

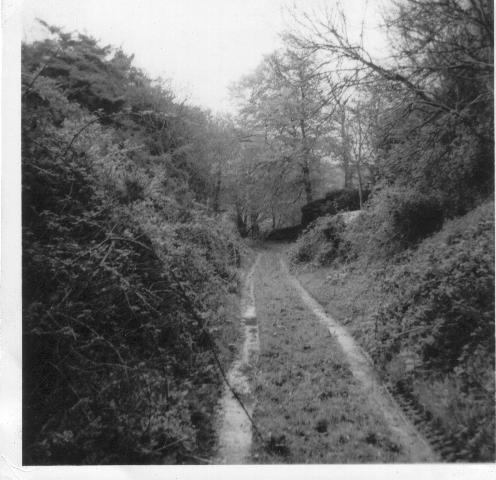
The old railway cutting at Kenwith Castle

Along Cornborough Cliffs the embankments and trackbed were very clear, as was the course of the line running down to Westward Ho! A bridge to create an underpass or right of way substantially survived as abutments, without the iron bridge itself however. The station at Westward Ho! remained 'almost' unaltered, apart from the missing track. The signal box was a sweet shop or snack bar. Almost all the railway buildings have now gone (2006), apart from the Station Hall.

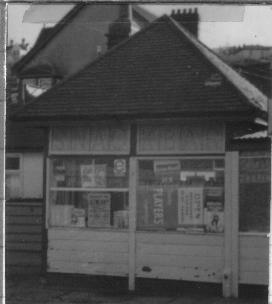
The old signal box, still at the station, in use as the Westward Ho! bus station snack bar

Very little was visible between Westward Ho! and Appledore, however near the Anglican church the back wall of the old station waiting rooms still stood with two chimney-breasts and fireplaces.

== Bideford Quay loop ==
The railway needed a loop to run its locomotives around the train on the quay. Without a loop the company had to go to the extra expense of having two locomotives in steam at one time, even with the winter load of a single coach. Bideford Town Council refused the construction and after much argument the railway company went ahead and built the loop in defiance of the council. A court injunction forced the railway company to remove it again. The railway appealed to the Board of Trade and by May 1903 permission had been secured to re-lay the loop. Later on a fine of 40 shillings was imposed on the company for allowing its trains to remain too long on the quay. In July 1901 a complaint was made that two loaded trucks had been left at the wharf and a week later the prosecution came to the Bideford Petty Sessions Court, together with matters relating to safety on the quay, no whistle or bell and no adequate driver's seat for the engine driver to see out, leading to a 10s fine.

The town council was always a thorn in the side of the company and the origins of the problem was the interruption to traffic which the trains on the quay caused, together with the effect that the rails and the wooden blocks had upon horse-drawn traffic and the decision to build the railway as a standard-gauge line. The carriages were unusually wide, increasing the problems of interference with road traffic.

== The fate of two signal boxes ==
Upon closure one box was purchased by a local farmer, Mr. Atkins. He tried to convert it into an extension to his house, however he failed and sold the box to a person in Westward Ho! who used it as a summer house. It still existed in 1968.

Another box, which was for many years used as a workshop in the garden at No.7, Springfield Terrace in Westward Ho! had no connection with the BWH&AR. The most likely origin is Maddaford Moor on the old North Cornwall LSWR line. This box was dismantled in January 2000 and removed for use on a garden railway near Newbury.

== Accidents and incidents ==
=== Incident in 1904 ===
A Bideford town councillor, Mr. William Bird, took a strong objection to having to stand on a train in August 1904 and swore at the passengers, despite women being present, calling them "a ---- set of national paupers and half pay officers." He went on to say that he could buy the ---- lot of them. He was fined 30s with 13s costs.

=== Accident ===
One day driver Shephard drove a train up to Westward Ho! and on arriving back at Bideford Quay it was found that the front of his locomotive, Kingsley, was splattered with blood. This caused a great deal of concern and no clue existed as to the origin of the blood, other than some blood stained fur. On the next journey to Westward Ho! the mangled remains of a donkey was found near Abbotsham Road station. The donkey belonged to Mrs. Videls of Abbotsham, who was paid the full price of replacing the donkey.

=== Motorcyclist's escape ===
In August 1910 a motorcyclist driving down the Pill decided to cut through a gateway onto the railway line, he did so, narrowly avoiding a pair of pedestrians, only to be confronted by the 4.35pm from Bideford to Appledore. The driver managed to stop the train in less than its own length and the motorcyclist hit the cowcatcher, suffering only minor injuries.

== See also ==
- Buckie and Portessie Branch – another line requisitioned in World War I and never re-opened.
