= June 1956 =

Month of 1956

<<	June 1956					>>
Su	Mo	Tu	We	Th	Fr	Sa
					1	2
3	4	5	6	7	8	9
10	11	12	13	14	15	16
17	18	19	20	21	22	23
24	25	26	27	28	29	30

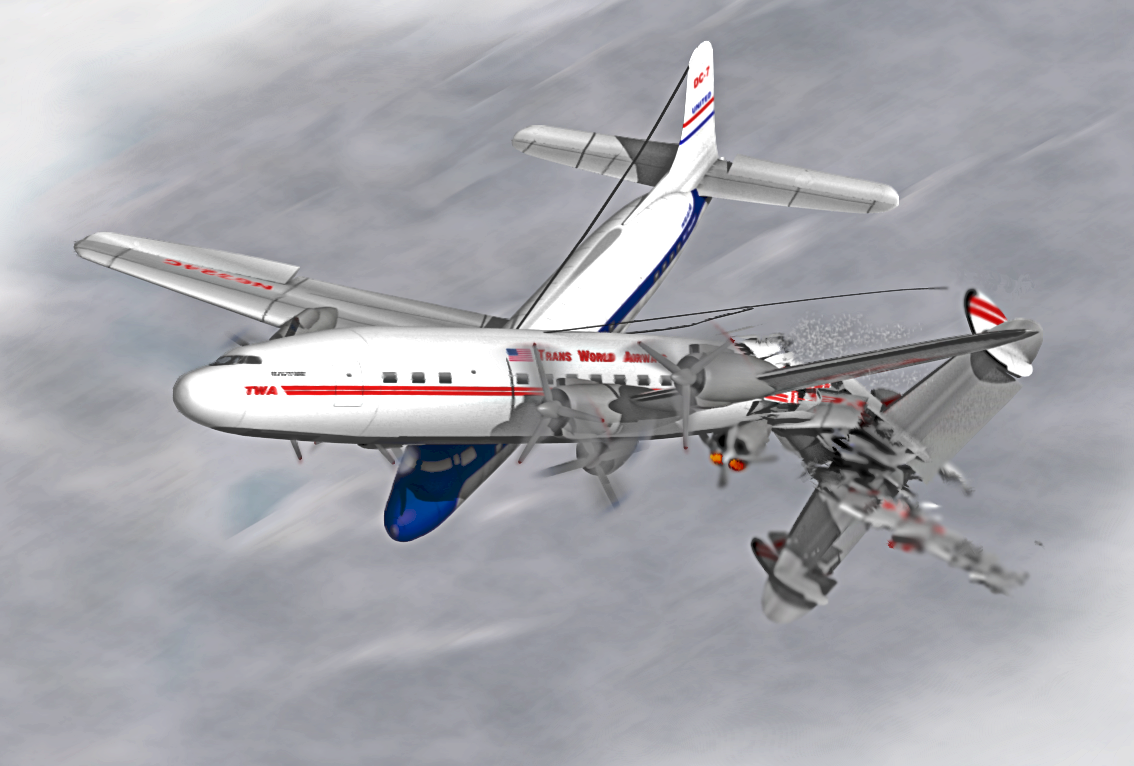
June 30, 1956: Two commercial airplanes, a TWA Super Constellation and a United Airlines DC-7, collided over the Grand Canyon. All 128 people on board both flights perished.

June 1956 was the sixth month of that leap year. The month which began on a Friday and ended after 30 days on a Saturday

The following events occurred in June 1956:

== June 1, 1956 (Friday) ==
- The Soviet Union's foreign minister, Vyacheslav Molotov, is removed from his position under the new regime of Nikita Khrushchev.
- Elsie Stephenson is the first director of the new Nurse Teaching Unit, University of Edinburgh, the first such unit to be set up in a British university.

== June 2, 1956 (Saturday) ==
- President Tito of Yugoslavia begins a three-week state visit to the Soviet Union, reinforcing a thaw in relations between the two countries after the death of Stalin.
- Died Jean Hersholt, Danish-American actor, in Los Angeles (b. 1886)

== June 3, 1956 (Sunday) ==
- British Railways, the UK's national rail service provider, abolishes second class accommodation (by now surviving only on Southern Region boat trains) on its trains and "Third" class is redesignated "Second" class.
- British submarine HMS Telemachus goes missing, presumed sunk, for several hours while conducting a hydrographic survey off the portion of Antarctica claimed by Australia. An air and sea search is conducted until a Douglas C-47 Skytrain spots the submarine and the "subsunk" order is cancelled.

== June 4, 1956 (Monday) ==
- Born: Keith David, American actor, in New York City

== June 5, 1956 (Tuesday) ==
- In Browder v. Gayle, a United States civil lawsuit resulting from the Montgomery bus boycott, the District Court rules that "the enforced segregation of black and white passengers on motor buses operating in the City of Montgomery [Alabama] violates the Constitution and laws of the United States".
- Elvis Presley appears on The Milton Berle Show on US television, singing "Hound Dog". It is the first time Presley has appeared on screen without a guitar, and the resulting performance attracts widespread criticism because of his "suggestive" movements.
- Born: Kenny G, US saxophonist, in Seattle, Washington

== June 6, 1956 (Wednesday) ==
- Singapore's Chief Minister David Marshall resigns just over a year into his chief ministership, after failing to negotiate full self-government for the colony at talks in London. He is replaced two days later by Lim Yew Hock.
- Tel Aviv University is founded in Israel.
- Born: Björn Borg, Swedish tennis player, in Stockholm
- Died: Hiram Bingham III, 80, US explorer, discoverer of Machu Picchu

== June 7, 1956 (Thursday) ==
- In the UK's Tonbridge by-election, brought about by the resignation of sitting MP, Gerald Wellington Williams, Richard Hornby retains the seat for the Conservatives.

== June 8, 1956 (Friday) ==
- General Electric/Telechron introduces model 7H241 "The Snooz Alarm", the first snooze alarm clock ever.
- The passenger ship Badora sinks in the Bay of Bengal with the loss of 196 out of the 202 people on board.
- A total solar eclipse takes place.
- Born: Aaron Freeman, American journalist, comedian, cartoonist and performer, in Chicago, Illinois

== June 9, 1956 (Saturday) ==
- Born: Patricia Cornwell, US crime novelist, in Miami, Florida

== June 10, 1956 (Sunday) ==
- The 1956 European Women's Basketball Championship, held in Prague, is won by the Soviet Union for the fourth time.
- Estádio José Alvalade opens in Lisbon, Portugal.

== June 11, 1956 (Monday) ==
- The equestrian events of the 1956 Summer Olympics open in Stockholm, Sweden, five months before the rest of the events in Melbourne, Australia; this was because of Australia's quarantine regulations.
- Died: Frank Brangwyn, 89, Belgian-born British artist and designer

== June 12, 1956 (Tuesday) ==
- Burma's leader U Nu relinquishes his role as Prime Minister of Burma and is replaced by Ba Swe.

== June 13, 1956 (Wednesday) ==
- A tropical storm makes landfall near Cocodrie, Louisiana, United States. By the time it dissipates, four people have been killed and damage is estimated at $50,000.
- Interpol becomes the common name of the International Criminal Police Commission.
- In the final of the 1955–56 European Cup football tournament, held at the Parc des Princes, Paris, Real Madrid C.F. defeat Stade Reims 4–3.

== June 14, 1956 (Thursday) ==
- Born: King Diamond, Danish musician, in Hvidovre, under the name Kim Bendix Petersen

== June 15, 1956 (Friday) ==
- The Natives (Prohibition of Interdicts) Act, 1956, receives Royal Assent, denying South Africa's natives the right to appeal to the courts against forced removals.

== June 16, 1956 (Saturday) ==
- The 1956 U.S. Open golf tournament is won by Cary Middlecoff.
- British poet Ted Hughes and US writer Sylvia Plath are married at the church of St George the Martyr, Holborn, London.

== June 17, 1956 (Sunday) ==
- In the Bolivian general election, Hernán Siles Zuazo of the Revolutionary Nationalist Movement (MNR) is elected president and his party wins 61 of the 68 seats in the chamber of deputies and all seats in the country's senate.
- The US-registered barge Danaco No. 5 sinks in the Kuskokwim River near Sleetmute, Alaska.

== June 18, 1956 (Monday) ==
- Born: Valentyna Lutayeva, Ukrainian handball player, in Zaporizhzhia (d. 2023)

== June 19, 1956 (Tuesday) ==
- Battle of Algiers: Two members of Algeria's National Liberation Front (the FLN) are guillotined at Barberousse Prison by the French authorities, resulting in immediate reprisals. In the next six days, 49 civilians are shot dead by the FLN in the city.
- Died: Thomas J. Watson, 82, US businessman

== June 20, 1956 (Wednesday) ==
- Linea Aeropostal Venezolana Flight 253, a Lockheed L-1049 Super Constellation travelling from New York to Caracas, catches fire while dumping fuel in order to return to Idlewild Airport after experiencing engine trouble. It crashes into the sea, killing all 74 people aboard; it was, to that date, the world's worst disaster involving a scheduled commercial flight.
- In the Quebec general election, the Union Nationale, under Maurice Duplessis, defeats the Quebec Liberal Party to win re-election.
- Former US President Harry S. Truman, during a tour of Europe, is presented with an honorary degree by the University of Oxford.
- The Canadian province of Saskatchewan holds a general election, resulting in the Co-operative Commonwealth Federation government of Tommy Douglas retaining its majority in the provincial legislature and winning a fourth term in office.

== June 21, 1956 (Thursday) ==
- US dramatist Arthur Miller is called before the House Un-American Activities Committee of the United States House of Representatives, but declines to name suspected Communists, resulting in his conviction for contempt of court.

== June 22, 1956 (Friday) ==
- Born: Shah Mehmood Qureshi, Pakistani agriculturist and politician, Minister of Foreign Affairs 2008–11, in Murree, Punjab
- Died: Walter de la Mare, 83, English poet

== June 23, 1956 (Saturday) ==
- A public referendum in Egypt leads to Gamal Abdel Nasser becoming the country's second president as a new constitution is adopted.
- The "Loi-cadre Defferre", a first step in the creation of the French Union, is passed by the French National Assembly, altering the relationship between France and its overseas possessions.
- Eindhoven University of Technology is established in Eindhoven, The Netherlands.
- Died: Reinhold Glière, 81, Russian composer

== June 24, 1956 (Sunday) ==
- 1956 Kano Airport BOAC Argonaut crash: A BOAC Canadair C-4 Argonaut G-ALHE bound for Libya hits a tree while taking off from Kano Airport in Nigeria, and crashes, killing 29 passengers and three crew members. Four crew members and nine passengers survive.
- The 1956 Copa del Generalísimo football tournament is won by Club Atlético de Bilbao, who defeat Atlético de Madrid 2–1 at the Estadio Chamartín in Madrid, Spain.

== June 25, 1956 (Monday) ==
- Born:
  - Boris Trajkovski, Macedonian politician and president 1999–2004, in Monospitovo, Strumica, Yugoslavia (died 2004)
  - Bob West, American voice actor, in Finleyville, Pennsylvania, United States

== June 26, 1956 (Tuesday) ==
- Australian collier ship Vicky sinks off Wilson's Promonotory, Victoria, Australia, with the loss of eight crew members.
- The 1956 Canada Cup golf competition, held at the Wentworth Club in Surrey, UK, is won by the US team of Ben Hogan and Sam Snead over the South African team of Bobby Locke and Gary Player, with Hogan also winning the individual prize.
- Born: Catherine Samba-Panza, president of the Central African Republic from 2014 to 2016, in Fort Lamy, French Equatorial Africa (now N'Djamena, Chad)
- Died: Clifford Brown, 25, US jazz trumpeter and Richie Powell, 24, US jazz pianist, in a car accident that also killed Powell's 19-year-old wife Nancy

== June 27, 1956 (Wednesday) ==
- A Commonwealth Prime Ministers' Conference opens in London, UK, chaired by British Prime Minister Anthony Eden.

== June 28, 1956 (Thursday) ==
- Poznań 1956 protests: A strike begins at the industrial complex of Joseph Stalin's (or 'Cegielski's) Metal Industries in Poznań, Poland. Soviet General Konstantin Rokossovsky sends in troops to break up the crowds of protesters, resulting in a number of fatalities.
- 20th Century Fox's film version of the Rodgers and Hammerstein 1951 stage musical The King and I, starring Deborah Kerr and Yul Brynner, is released in the US, becoming the most successful film version of any of their musicals up to that date.

== June 29, 1956 (Friday) ==
- The draw for the 1956–57 European Cup takes place in Paris, France, at the UEFA HQ.
- US film star Marilyn Monroe marries US dramatist Arthur Miller at Westchester County Court in White Plains, New York.
- US President Dwight D. Eisenhower signs the Federal Aid Highway Act of 1956 into law, authorizing the construction of 41,000 miles (66,000 km) of interstate highways.

== June 30, 1956 (Saturday) ==
- Dunmore King wins the final of the 1956 English Greyhound Derby at White City Stadium in London, receiving £1,500.
- Two planes collide over the Grand Canyon, killing 128 people—more than any previous accident in commercial aviation.
