= Tonks Fawcett =

British professor

Tonks Fawcett is a Professor of Student Learning in Nursing Studies at the University of Edinburgh and a Principal Fellow of the Higher Education Academy. Her research focuses on mainly around clinical support of learner nurses and clinical decision making.

== Early life and education ==
Fawcett graduated with a BSc Social Science from the City University London in 1974 and completed her nursing degree programme at St Bartholomew's Hospital. She went on to complete a MSc in Nursing Education from the University of Edinburgh in 1984 and has had a long career in nurse education.

== Career ==
Fawcett's clinical career ranged from surgical nursing to the hospital/community interface with general practice. Hence, her research includes cancer care and survivorship and also explores a range of interventions that could improve pain management. Currently, her research focus is on the role of the biosciences in nurse education and on the student nurse knowledge and skills required for care home nursing. Peer assisted learning is another area of pedagogical research that she examines to support students to learn when working in interdisciplinary practice in healthcare. She has also spent time in Malawi supporting nursing education in Africa, particularly examining how undergraduate nursing students learn in low-resource hospital and other clinical settings.

Fawcett has published widely as co-editor of the first three editions of the major nursing textbook Nursing Practice: Hospital and Home - The Adult and co-author of Altschul's Psychology for Nurses. She also is a co-author of Pathophysiology, Homeostasis and Nursing and co-editor of Perspectives on Cancer Care.

Fawcett is a friend of J.K. Rowling, author of the Harry Potter book series and her name has been used for characters in the books such as Nymphadora Tonks and S. Fawcett who appears in Harry Potter and the Goblet of Fire.
