= October 1956 =

Month of 1956

| << | October 1956 | | | | | >> |
| Su | Mo | Tu | We | Th | Fr | Sa |
| | 1 | 2 | 3 | 4 | 5 | 6 |
| 7 | 8 | 9 | 10 | 11 | 12 | 13 |
| 14 | 15 | 16 | 17 | 18 | 19 | 20 |
| 21 | 22 | 23 | 24 | 25 | 26 | 27 |
| 28 | 29 | 30 | 31 |

October 1956 was the tenth month of that leap year. The month which began on a Monday and ended after 31 days on a Wednesday

The following events occurred in October 1956:

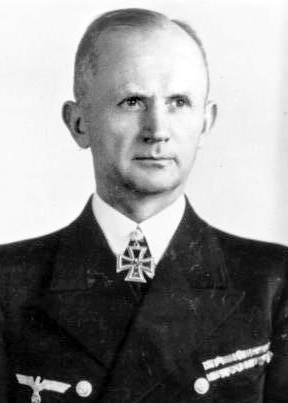
October 1: Former Grand Admiral Karl Doenitz is released from Spandau Prison

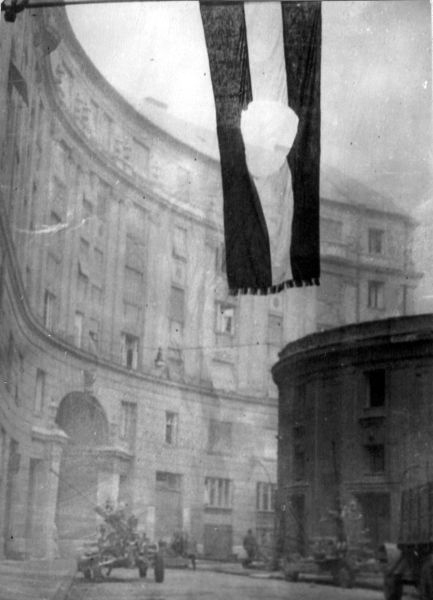
October 23: The Hungarian Revolution of 1956 breaks out in the capital Budapest

== October 1, 1956 (Monday) ==
- Federico Fellini ends the shooting of Nights of Cabiria.
- Former Großadmiral and Last Head of State of Nazi Germany, Karl Doenitz is released from Spandau Prison after completing his 10-year sentence for his War Crimes during The Second World War.
- Born:
  - Andrus Ansip, Estonian politician, 10th Prime Minister of Estonia, in Tartu
  - Theresa May, Prime Minister of the United Kingdom, in Eastbourne, Sussex
- Died: Albert Von Tilzer, US songwriter, 78

== October 2, 1956 (Tuesday) ==
- The end of voting in the Kenyan general election; elections for other constituencies would take place the following March.
- Douglas MacArthur rejects nomination as a candidate in the coming New York State election.

== October 3, 1956 (Wednesday) ==
- The opening game of the 1956 World Series of baseball is held at Ebbets Field, New York City, United States, where the Brooklyn Dodgers defeat the New York Yankees.

== October 4, 1956 (Thursday) ==
- In Italy, the United Action Pact between PCI and PSI, in force from 1934, becomes, by mutual agreement, a less binding Consultation Pact. In parallel, PSI and PSDI carry on the tractates for a future reunification of the two Italian Socialist parties.
- Negev desert road ambush: Palestinian Fedayeen militants attack two Israeli jeeps on the Sodom–Beer Sheva road (Highway 25), travelling near the southern part of the Dead Sea, 7 miles west of the Jordanian border with Israel. Four passengers are killed.
- Born: Christoph Waltz, Austrian actor, in Vienna

== October 5, 1956 (Friday) ==
- The Ten Commandments, starring Charlton Heston as Moses and directed by Cecil B. DeMille, is released in the United States. It becomes one of the highest-grossing films of all time.

== October 6, 1956 (Saturday) ==
- English footballer Bobby Charlton makes his first appearance for Manchester United F.C., aged 18, in a match against Charlton Athletic.
- Born: Bruno Nockler, Italian skier, in Predoi (died in 1982 in a car accident).

== October 7, 1956 (Sunday) ==
- The 50th Paris–Tours cycle race is won by Albert Bouvet.
- Born: Brian Sutter, Canadian ice hockey player and coach, in Viking, Alberta

== October 8, 1956 (Monday) ==
- Don Larsen's perfect game: Don Larsen, pitcher of the New York Yankees baseball team, throws the only perfect game in World Series history in Game 5 of the World Series against the Brooklyn Dodgers. The Yankees win the series in seven games and Larsen is named series MVP.

== October 9, 1956 (Tuesday) ==
- Born: Tran Dai Quang, President of Vietnam, in Ninh Bình. (d. 2018)

== October 10, 1956 (Wednesday) ==
- In Terrazzano (Milan) two lunatics, the brothers Arturo and Egidio Santato (the first just released by a criminal madhouse) take hostage, in a primary school, 97 children and three schoolmistresses, asking for a ransom. After a day of anguish, the situation is unlocked by two volunteers, the worker Sante Zennaro and the private eye Tom Ponzi, who enter in the school. All the hostages are saved, but, for a tragic mistake, Zennaro is killed by the policemen's fire.
- Finland is admitted as a member of UNESCO.
- "Operation Samaria" is carried out by the Israel Defense Forces in the West Bank. The action results in the deaths of 100 Jordanian soldiers and 17 IDF soldiers.

== October 11, 1956 (Thursday) ==
- The Lockheed L-1649 Starliner prototype makes its first flight.
- Born:
  - Nicanor Duarte, President of Paraguay 2003–2008, in Coronel Oviedo
  - Edoardo Albinati, Italian writer, Premio Strega by La scuola cattolica (The catholic school), in Rome,.

== October 12, 1956 (Friday) ==
- Born: Trần Đại Quang, President of Vietnam, in Ninh Bình Province (d. 2018)
- Died: Lorenzo Perosi, 83, Catholic priest and composer of religious music.

== October 13, 1956 (Saturday) ==
- In Australia, the Tasmanian state election results in the continuation of a 15-seat deadlock between the ALP and Liberal Party.

== October 14, 1956 (Sunday) ==
- In Trento, the sixth Congress of the DC, the first after the De Gasperi's death, begins; it sees the confirmation of the secretary, Amintore Fanfani, and of his statist line. The Fanfani's group, "Iniziativa democratica" (Democratic initiative) gets an almost complete grasp on the party.
- Indira Kala Sangeet University, Khairagarh, India, is inaugurated by Prime Minister Jawaharlal Nehru.
- Dalit Buddhist movement: B. R. Ambedkar carries out a mass religious conversion ceremony at Chandrapur, India.
- Typhoon Jean forms in the Pacific Ocean.

== October 15, 1956 (Monday) ==
- The sixth Miss World competition is held at the Lyceum Ballroom in London, UK, and is won by Petra Schürmann of Germany, after an administrative error results in US representative Betty Lane Cherry being given the winner's sash just before the ceremony; she was subsequently named first runner-up.

== October 16, 1956 (Tuesday) ==
- Died: Jules Rimet, 83, French football administrator

== October 17, 1956 (Wednesday) ==
- The world's first industrial-scale commercial nuclear power plant is opened by Queen Elizabeth II at Calder Hall in the UK.
- In chess's so-called "Game of the Century", 13-year-old Bobby Fischer defeats grandmaster Donald Byrne at the Rosenwald Memorial Tournament in New York City.

== October 18, 1956 (Thursday) ==
- "Great Train Wreck of 1956": A head-on collision between two Atlantic Coast Line Railroad freight trains occurs near Pineola, Florida, United States, killing five crew members.
- Born: Martina Navratilova, Czech-American tennis player, in Prague

== October 19, 1956 (Friday) ==
- The Soviet–Japanese Joint Declaration of 1956 is signed in Moscow, ending the legal state of war between the Soviet Union and Japan (with effect from December 12) and making possible the restoration of diplomatic relations between the two nations.
- Born: Carlo Urbani, Italian physician and microbiologist, discoverer of SARS, in Castelpiano (Ancona). (d. 2003)

== October 20, 1956 (Saturday) ==
- Born: Danny Boyle, English director, producer, screenwriter and theatre director, in Radcliffe, Greater Manchester

== October 21, 1956 (Sunday) ==
- "Polish October": After seven years in the political wilderness, Władysław Gomułka is returned to power as leader of Poland's Communist Party, marking the start of a "brief period of hope" in which the country distanced itself from the Soviet Union.
- During Typhoon Harriet, the Philippines cargo ship Lepus founders off Legaspi, with the loss of 25 of her 36 crew. The survivors are rescued by the US Navy.
- The 1956 Norwegian Football Cup Final is played in Oslo, and is won by Skeid, who defeat Larvik Turn 2–1.

== October 22, 1956 (Monday) ==
- Discussions open between the governments of the United Kingdom, France and Israel, leading to the Protocol of Sèvres, which sets out tactics for invading and occupying the Suez Canal.
- The airplane transporting Ahmed Ben Bella and four FLN exponents from Rabat to Tunis is forced to land in Algers and the five men are arrested by the French Army. The action, performed without the knowledge of the Prime Minister Guy Mollet, causes the retire from Paris of the Moroccan and Tunisian ambassadors, many protest in the French public opinion and an hardening of the Algerian war; more, it makes Ben Bella the moral leader of the revolution.
- A group of dissident Hungarian students draws up a list of sixteen demands for political reform, and declares their intent to hold a demonstration the next day in Budapest.
- Born: Marco Lodoli, Italian writer, in Rome.

== October 23, 1956 (Tuesday) ==
- The Hungarian Revolution begins, as over 20,000 protesters convene at the statue of national hero József Bem in Budapest. ÁVH secret police forces open fire on the crowd, and the demonstration escalates into a full-scale armed revolution.

== October 24, 1956 (Wednesday) ==
- Hungarian Revolution of 1956: A massive Soviet force invades Budapest at the request of the Stalinist regime of Ernő Gerő, facing stiff resistance from armed civilians. The reformist Communist Imre Nagy is reinstalled as Prime Minister by popular demand, but fighting continues.
- 1956 Nicaragua earthquake: An earthquake with a magnitude of 7.3, accompanied by a tsunami, causes damage in Managua, the capital of Nicaragua.
- The 1956 FA Charity Shield is won by Manchester United F.C., who defeat their local rivals Manchester City F.C. at Maine Road, Manchester, UK.

== October 25, 1956 (Thursday) ==
- Hungarian Revolution of 1956: ÁVH secret policemen open fire on a peaceful and unarmed crowd in front of the Hungarian Parliament Building in Budapest, provoking Soviet troops, who believe they are being fired on from the crowd, to also open fire. At least 100 civilians are killed. The massacre galvanizes support for the Revolution among the populace, and fighting continues to escalate between insurgents and Soviet forces. János Kádár replaces Ernő Gerő as Hungarian Party leader.
- In Germany, the Berchetsgarden Tribunal declares Adolf Hitler "officially dead", after a four-year enquiry and the hearing as witnesses of the dictator's attendants.
- Died: Risto Ryti, 67, Finnish politician, former Prime Minister (1939–1940) and President (1940–44)

== October 26, 1956 (Friday) ==
- Hungarian Revolution: In the towns of Mosonmagyaróvár and Esztergom, ÁVH secret police forces massacre unarmed civilians. As rebel strongholds in Budapest hold, fighting spreads throughout Hungary.
- Died: Walter Gieseking, 60, French-born German pianist and composer (pancreatitis)

== October 27, 1956 (Saturday) ==
- Hungarian Revolution: Imre Nagy announces the formation of a new government, to include members of previously banned non-Communist parties.
- In Italy, a statement of the leftist syndicate CGIL supports the Hungarian insurgents and censures the Soviet intervention. The Communist secretary of CGIL, Giuseppe Di Vittorio, a week later retracts the declaration under his party's pressure.
- The Scottish League Cup Final is played at Hampden Park, Glasgow, UK, between Celtic F.C. and Partick Thistle F.C. and ends in a goalless draw, necessitating a replay.

== October 28, 1956 (Sunday) ==
- Hungarian Revolution: A de facto ceasefire comes into effect between armed revolutionaries and Soviet troops, who begin to withdraw from Budapest. Communist officials and facilities begin to come under attack from the revolutionaries. Imre Nagy's faction gains full control of the Hungarian government, as many Stalinist hardliners leave the country for the Soviet Union.
- Twenty-one year old Elvis Presley is inoculated, before the world's press, and as originally suggested by the March of Dimes, with the third version of Dr Jonas Salk's anti-polio vaccine. Dr. Harold Fuerst, with assistance from the NY Health Commissioner Dr. Leona Baumgartner, are the physicians in charge, all of which leads to the exponential increase in the immunization level of all Americans from 0.6% to 80% in the next 6 months.
- Pope Pius XII, in the encyclical Luctuosissimi eventus, asks the bishops of the whole world for public prayers for the Hungarian people.

== October 29, 1956 (Monday) ==
- Hungarian Revolution: As Soviet troops continue to withdraw from Budapest, Imre Nagy moves his office from the Communist Party Headquarters to the Hungarian Parliament building.
- In Italy, 101 Communist intellectuals sign a manifest (Manifest of 101) redacted by Carlo Muscetta, that criticizes the Soviet interference on Hungary and the line of the PCI about the question; L'Unità, official organ of the PCI, refuses to publish the text. In front of the party's rigidity, some of the signers retract (Elio Petri, Paolo Spriano); others disown the communism (Renzo De Felice, Lucio Colletti, and Antonio Maccanico).
- Israel invades Egypt, beginning the Suez War.
- Born: Kazuyo Sejima, Japanese architect, in Mito, Ibaraki

== October 30, 1956 (Tuesday) ==
- Hungarian Revolution: The government recognizes the new workers' councils. Armed protesters attack the detachment of state security police guarding the Budapest Hungarian Working People's Party headquarters in Republic Square, believing that prisoners are held there. Over 20 security officers are killed, as is the head of the Budapest party committee, Imre Mező.
- In Rome, in the course of a manifestation supporting the Hungarian people, some militants of the Social Movement, headed by Pino Romualdi, attack the PCI's seat and the redaction of the communist newspaper L'Unità.
- Hurricane Greta begins to form near Jamaica.

== October 31, 1956 (Wednesday) ==
- Hungarian Revolution: A Revolutionary Headquarters is established in Hungary. Following Imre Nagy's announcement of October 30, banned non-Communist political parties are reformed, and the MDP is replaced by the MSZMP. József Mindszenty is released from prison. The Soviet Politburo makes the decision to crush the Revolution.
- Suez Crisis: As agreed by the Protocol of Sèvres, the United Kingdom and France begin attacking Egyptian targets to force the reopening of the Suez Canal. The light cruiser HMS Newfoundland and escorting destroyer HMS Diana sink the Egyptian frigate Domiat, with the loss of 38 of its crew.
- Operation Deep Freeze: A United States Navy team, led by Admiral George J. Dufek and travelling by air, becomes the third group of human beings to reach the South Pole, and commences construction of the first permanent Amundsen–Scott South Pole Station.
- A successful test launch of the R-11 Zemlya tactical ballistic missile is carried out by the Soviet Union in the White Sea.
- The Scottish League Cup Final is replayed at Hampden Park, Glasgow, UK, and is won by Celtic F.C.
