= Margaret Scott-Wright =

British nurse and academic

- Margaret Scott-Wright, from a 1984 yearbook.
- Born: 1923; Norwich, England
- Died: 11 March 2008 (aged 84–85)
- Other names: Margaret Scott Wright (no hyphen)
- Education: University of Edinburgh; St George's Hospital
- Occupation(s): Nursing educator, college administrator

Margaret Scott-Wright (1923 – 11 March 2008) was a Professor of Nursing at the University of Edinburgh, and later head of nursing schools in Canada. Her research related to public health and nursing education. In 1971, she became the first professor in Nursing Studies in the United Kingdom.

== Early life and education ==
Margaret Scott-Wright was from Norwich. She earned a degree in history at the University of Edinburgh in 1946. She also earned certification as a nurse and as a midwife at the St George's Hospital School of Nursing in London. In 1961, she completed doctoral work on public health at the University of Edinburgh. Her research considered the factors of success or failure in Scottish student nurses.

== Career ==
After training, Scott-Wright stayed at St George's Hospital as deputy matron, then worked as director of nursing at Middlesex Hospital. When Elsie Stephenson died in 1967, Scott-Wright succeeded her as director of the nursing studies program at Edinburgh, and in 1971 became the first chair of a nursing studies department in the United Kingdom. She was a member of the Briggs Committee on nursing education, and served a term as vice president of the International Council of Nurses (ICN).

Scott-Wright moved to Canada in 1976, where she served as director of the School of Nursing at Dalhousie University in Nova Scotia for three years, and as dean of the Faculty of Nursing at the University of Calgary from 1979 until her retirement in 1985, with one final stint as acting dean to cover a vacancy in 1989. Scott-Wright and others built a foundation for Canada's first doctoral program in nursing at Calgary.

== Personal life and legacy ==
Margaret Scott-Wright retired to Norwich, and died in 2008, aged 84 years. The Canadian Association of Schools of Nursing held an annual Margaret Scott Wright Research Day, to highlight student and faculty research in the field, until 2019, when it was renamed the Dr. Shirley Stinson Research Conference, after one of Scott-Wright's colleagues. The University of Calgary offered an annual Margaret Scott Wright Scholarship for nursing student.
