= March 1956 =

Month of 1956

<<	March 1956					>>
Su	Mo	Tu	We	Th	Fr	Sa
				1	2	3
4	5	6	7	8	9	10
11	12	13	14	15	16	17
18	19	20	21	22	23	24
25	26	27	28	29	30	31

The following events occurred in March 1956:

== March 1, 1956 (Thursday) ==
- The NATO phonetic alphabet (the International Radiotelephony Spelling Alphabet) was drafted by the International Air Transport Association for the International Civil Aviation Organization.
- In Washington, D.C., United States, a replica of the Discus Thrower was dedicated; it was a gift from the Italian government to acknowledge the return of art objects looted during World War II.
- The National People's Army of East Germany was formed.
- Born:
  - Tim Daly, US actor; in New York City
  - Dalia Grybauskaitė, Lithuanian politician, President (2009-2019); in Vilnius

== March 2, 1956 (Friday) ==
- Morocco reached agreement with France, ending the protectorate, to become the independent "Kingdom of Morocco".
- While rehearsing for a coming air show, four Canadair Sabre fighter planes of the Sky Lancers aerobatics team of No. 4 Wing, Royal Canadian Air Force, based in West Germany, crashed in the Upper Rhine Valley southwest of Strasbourg, France, while performing a loop in formation; all four pilots were killed, and RCAF aerobatic flying stopped.
- Born: Eduardo Rodríguez, Bolivian politician, President 2005–06; in Cochabamba
- Died: Fred Merkle, 67, American baseball player whose failure to touch second base on what should have been a game-winning hit in a September 1908 game against the Chicago Cubs cost the New York Giants the National League pennant that year.

== March 3, 1956 (Saturday) ==
- A state election in New South Wales, Australia, resulted in the Australian Labor Party, under incumbent Premier Joseph Cahill, retaining a majority over a coalition of the Liberal and Country parties.

== March 4, 1956 (Sunday) ==
- Popular demonstrations began in the Georgian Soviet Socialist Republic, protesting against Nikita Khrushchev's de-Stalinization policy.
- Elections to the National Constituent Assembly took place in South Vietnam. President Ngo Dinh Diem's party won 90 of the 123 seats.

== March 5, 1956 (Monday) ==
- The last steam locomotive to have been purchased new by Southern Pacific Railroad was retired from service.
- Born: Teena Marie, US singer-songwriter; in Santa Monica, under the name Mary Christine Brockert (died 2010)

== March 6, 1956 (Tuesday) ==
- West Germany's Bundestag approved 14 constitutional amendments which allowed for rearmament and civilian control over the armed forces, re-introducing conscription.

== March 7, 1956 (Wednesday) ==
- Avalanches in Norway's Nordland and Troms regions caused 21 deaths and heavy damage.
- Born: Bryan Cranston, US actor; in Hollywood, Los Angeles

== March 8, 1956 (Thursday) ==
- In the Hong Kong municipal election, the Reform Club of Hong Kong won four of the six seats, while the new Hong Kong Civic Association won the other two.

== March 9, 1956 (Friday) ==
- British security forces deported Archbishop Makarios III from Cyprus; he arrived in Mahe Island, Seychelles, as a "guest" of Governor Sir William Addis.
- In Tbilisi, where pro-Stalin protests continued, Soviet troops fired on a demonstrating crowd, resulting in at least 100 casualties.

== March 10, 1956 (Saturday) ==
- A Fairey Delta 2 research aircraft, developed by the Fairey Aviation Company, broke the World Air Speed Record, achieving a speed of 1,132 mph (1,822 km/h) as 300 mph (480 km/h) over the previous record. It became the first aircraft to exceed 1,000 mph (1,600 km/h) in level flight, with permission, but no active support, from the British government.
- A United States Air Force Boeing B-47 Stratojet and its 3-man crew disappeared over the Mediterranean Sea. The wreckage has to date not been located.

== March 11, 1956 (Sunday) ==
- The Belgian ship MV Prince de Liege caught fire off the coast of Spain and was abandoned by its crew. The ship was towed by a Spanish naval tug, then by the Swedish salvage ship Herakles to Gibraltar.

== March 12, 1956 (Monday) ==
- 101 members of the U.S. Senate and House of Representatives signed the Southern Manifesto, in protest against the 1954 Supreme Court ruling Brown v. Board of Education, opposing racial integration in public places.
- The Dow Jones Industrial Average closed above 500 for the first time, rising 2.40 points, or 0.48%, to 500.24.
- Born: Dale Murphy, American baseball player; in Portland, Oregon

== March 13, 1956 (Tuesday) ==
- In the United States New Hampshire Democratic Party primary, Estes Kefauver of Tennessee defeated Adlai Stevenson, the eventual winner of the Democratic nomination.
- Born: Motoharu Sano, Japanese musician and singer-songwriter; in Taitō, Tokyo
- Died: David Browning, 24, 1952 Olympic diving gold medalist from the United States, died in a jet fighter crash near Rantoul, Kansas during a training flight.

== March 14, 1956 (Wednesday) ==
- The French fishing trawler Vert Prairial was driven ashore at Wireless Point, Porthcurno, Cornwall, UK. All 17 on board died.
- Harry Pollitt, General Secretary of the Communist Party of Great Britain, unveiled a memorial to Karl Marx at Highgate Cemetery, London, UK, following the reburial of Marx and his family a few months earlier.

== March 15, 1956 (Thursday) ==
- A general election was held in Nyasaland (later Malawi) for the first time ever. The newly elected Legislative Council consisted of eleven officials (five indirectly-elected seats for Africans and six elected seats for non-Africans).
- The musical My Fair Lady received its Broadway première at the Mark Hellinger Theatre, with Rex Harrison in the role of Higgins and Julie Andrews as Eliza. It would run for a record 2,717 performances.

== March 16, 1956 (Friday) ==
- Mount Lebanon Governorate, Lebanon, was struck by a magnitude 5.3 earthquake, followed 11 minutes later by a magnitude 5.5 quake in Beqaa Governorate. Overall, 148 people were killed. The second quake was located under Lebanon at a depth of 15.0 kilometres (9.3 mi).
- The South African government passed the Riotous Assemblies Act no. 17, prohibiting any outside gathering that the Minister of Justice considered a threat to public peace. Nelson Mandela would later become one of many charged with offences under the Act.

== March 17, 1956 (Saturday) ==
- Died:
  - Fred Allen, 61, US comedian, died of a heart attack.
  - Irène Joliot-Curie, 58, French physicist, recipient of the Nobel Prize in Chemistry, died of leukaemia.

== March 18, 1956 (Sunday) ==
- The US navy destroyer USS Willis A. Lee (DD-929) was driven onto rocks at Jamestown, Rhode Island, in a storm. It would be repaired and returned to service later in the year.
- The Italian cargo ship SS Etrusco ran aground at Scituate, Massachusetts, United States. All 30 crew members were rescued by breeches buoy.

== March 19, 1956 (Monday) ==
- 48-year-old Dutch boxer Bep van Klaveren contested his last match in Rotterdam, losing to Werner Handtke.
- Born: Yegor Gaidar, Russian economist, politician and author; in Moscow (died 2009)

== March 20, 1956 (Tuesday) ==
- Tunisia gained independence from French rule as an independent kingdom under Muhammad VIII al-Amin, the country's last bey.
- A 2-day nor'easter, affecting the US Mid-Atlantic States and southern New England, came to an end, leaving an estimated 162 people dead.
- Died:
  - Fanny Durack, 66, Australian swimmer
  - Wilhelm Miklas, 83, 3rd President of Austria

== March 21, 1956 (Wednesday) ==
- At the 28th Academy Awards ceremony in Los Angeles, United States, Marty became the shortest film to win the Academy Award for Best Picture. Its star, Ernest Borgnine, won the Academy Award for Best Actor.
- Born: Ingrid Kristiansen, Norwegian athlete; in Trondheim

== March 22, 1956 (Thursday) ==
- In the early hours of the morning, US singer Carl Perkins was injured in a car accident near Wilmington, Delaware, on his way to New York City to make an appearance on The Perry Como Show. Perkins suffered three fractured vertebrae in his neck, a severe concussion, a broken collar bone, and multiple lacerations; he remained unconscious for an entire day.

== March 23, 1956 (Friday) ==
- Pakistan adopted a new constitution, becoming the world's first Islamic republic, although it would not adopt a state religion until 1973.
- In the UK's Grand National steeplechase, Devon Loch, a horse owned by Queen Elizabeth The Queen Mother and ridden by Dick Francis, inexplicably collapsed 50 yards (45 m) from the finish while leading the race. The jockey later suggested that the horse was distracted by the cheers of the crowd.

== March 24, 1956 (Saturday) ==
- Born: Steve Ballmer, US entrepreneur; in Detroit

== March 25, 1956 (Sunday) ==
- Died:
  - Robert Newton, 50, English actor, died of a heart attack.
  - Lou Moore, 51, American race car driver and team owner, died of a brain hemorrhage.

== March 26, 1956 (Monday) ==
- Colonel Tom Parker was formally appointed as Elvis Presley's manager.

== March 27, 1956 (Tuesday) ==
- The United States Internal Revenue Service raided the offices of the Communist newspaper The Daily Worker in New York and other locations, for non-payment of taxes. The editor claimed that the paper lost $200,000 in the previous year and therefore owed no taxes.

== March 28, 1956 (Wednesday) ==
- The UK cargo ship Changsha ran aground at Tokyo, Japan; it was later successfully refloated.

== March 29, 1956 (Thursday) ==
- Four Israeli soldiers captured by Syria in the Golan Heights in 1954 were returned to Israel, in exchange for forty Syrian soldiers captured during Operation Olive Leaves.
- US President Dwight D. Eisenhower declared the giant sequoia, General Grant, located in Kings Canyon National Park, United States, a "National Shrine".

== March 30, 1956 (Friday) ==
- Bezymianny, a volcano in Russia's Kamchatka Peninsula, erupted, destroying the summit and forming a horseshoe-shaped crater.

== March 31, 1956 (Saturday) ==
- Typhoon Sarah approached the Philippines but changed direction at the last moment and dissipated within a few days.
