= Pam Smith =

Professor of Nursing at the University of Edinburgh

Pam Smith MBE FRCN is a Professor of Nursing in the School of Health in Social Science at the University of Edinburgh. Her research relates to emotions and care within the nursing profession.

== Early life and education ==
Smith graduated from the Bachelor of Nursing programme at the University of Manchester. She gained a postgraduate certificate in adult education from Garnett College in 1973 and a MSc in Medical Sociology from Bedford College in 1982. Smith was awarded a Doctor of Philosophy (PhD) from King's College London in 1988 for a thesis entitled "The Quality of Nursing and the Ward as a Learning Environment for Student Nurses: A Multimethod Approach".

== Career ==
Smith was a nurse and teacher in Tanzania, Mozambique and Britain early in her career and later became a nurse researcher. On completion of her doctoral studies at King's College London, she was awarded a Florence Nightingale Travel Scholarship and Fulbright Fellowship to study US nursing and healthcare and spent a year as a post-doctoral research with Professor Arlie Russell Hochschild at the University of California Berkeley, developing the application of emotional labour to nursing. She continues this area of research exploring how nurses manage emotions in intensive care settings, how older peoples' voices can be heard and investigating the transitions experienced by professionals and parents caring for children with cancer. She went on to hold research leadership roles at Bloomsbury (later Camden and Islington) Health Authority from 1985 to 1992 and then at London South Bank University from 1997 to 2001. In 2012, Smith was appointed Professorial Fellow in Nursing Studies at the University of Edinburgh having previously held a secondment as Professor of Nurse Education at the University of Surrey from 2009 to 2012. She then became Head of Nursing Studies from August 2010 to December 2013.

Smith's more recent research has examined new forms of development and brokerage in maternal and child health service delivery in Nepal and Malawi, developed a UK taxonomy and framework for facilitating health policy deliberations on maximising secondary uses of healthcare data and explored how delivering maternal and child healthcare can be improved through educating clinical professionals in Malawi. Currently, she is a visiting professor at the Florence Nightingale Faculty of Nursing and Midwifery, King's College London and Honorary Professor, Faculty of Health Sciences, University of Maribor, Slovenia. Smith was appointed a Member of the Order of the British Empire (MBE) for services to nursing and nurse education in the 2016 Queen's Birthday Honours. In 2024 she was awarded Fellowship of the Royal College of Nursing.
