= Lisbeth Hockey =

Austrian-born British nurse and researcher

Lisbeth Hockey OBE FRCN
- Born: 1918
- Died: 2004 (aged 85–86)
- Occupation: nurse educator
- Employer: University of Edinburgh

Lisbeth Hockey OBE FRCN (17 October 1918 – 16 June 2004) was an Austrian-born British nurse and researcher. She was the first director of the Nursing Research Unit in Edinburgh. She was awarded a PhD for research in nursing, one of the first people to do so.

== Early life ==
Lisbeth Hochsinger was born on 17 October 1918 in Graz, Austria. In 1936 she began studying medicine at the University of Graz where she completed three years of the course before being sent away from the threatening political situation in Hitler's Germany. She was unaware that her family had some Jewish ancestry, but later both her parents were taken to concentration camps where they died. With assistance from the Society of Friends, Hochsinger arrived in England in 1938 and went to Devon to stay with a brigadier and his wife. She first worked as a governess for their children and learned sufficient English to start nursing training in London.

== Nursing career ==
In 1939 she was accepted to do her general nurse training at The London Hospital. She left the London Hospital on account of a new rule that stopped non-British subjects from nursing people who could be prisoners of war. She was allowed to train at Coppetts Wood Hospital in Muswell Hill and she qualified as a fever nurse in 1943. She then went to the Peace Memorial Hospital in Watford, completing her general nursing training in 1945. She changed her name to Hockey in 1949. She went to the North Middlesex Hospital, Edmonton and studied for her Midwifery Part 1. For the second part of her midwifery training she chose to go to Essex where she would spend time in the district. In 1950 she gained a health visitor qualification from Battersea Polytechnic.

In 1965, she began working at the Queen's Institute of District Nursing in London, first as a tutor and then as a research officer. In 1970 she gained a Bachelor of Science in Economics from the University of London.

In October 1971, Hockey was appointed the first director of the Nursing Research Unit in Edinburgh. It was the first nursing research unit at a British University. She completed a PhD in 1979, an uncommon achievement. Her PhD was awarded by City University, London. Her thesis, A Study of District Nursing: the development and progression of a long term research programme provided an early description of the responsibilities involved.

== Later life ==
Although retired, she remained active in the nursing world. The last year of her life was spent in a nursing home. She died in Edinburgh on 16 June 2004.

== Awards and honours ==
She was made an Officer of the Most Excellent Order of the British Empire (OBE) in the 1979 Birthday Honours.

The Royal College of Nursing (RCN) made her a fellow in 1980. She was made an honorary fellow by the Royal College of General Practitioners (RCGP) in 1982, the first nurse to be honoured this way. It would be more than twenty years before another nurse was given this same honour. She was proud of this honour, having always intended to care for the whole person. In 1987 she was made an Honorary Member of the Austrian Nursing Association.

In 2000 she received the Gold Medal of Honour from the Queen's Nursing Institute, only the fourth person to receive this honour.

She was bestowed with honorary degrees from the University of Alberta in 1980, University of Uppsala in 1985 and the Queen Margaret University College, Edinburgh in 1995.

== Bibliography ==
- Feeling the Pulse (1966)
- Care in the Balance (1968)
