= May 1956 =

Month of 1956

<<	May 1956					>>
Su	Mo	Tu	We	Th	Fr	Sa
		1	2	3	4	5
6	7	8	9	10	11	12
13	14	15	16	17	18	19
20	21	22	23	24	25	26
27	28	29	30	31

The following events occurred in May 1956:

== May 1, 1956 (Tuesday) ==
- Israel's Finance Minister, Levi Eshkol, approved the development of the new city of Ashdod on the Mediterranean coast.
- Born: Tim Sale, American comic book artist; in Ithaca, New York (d. 2022)

== May 2, 1956 (Wednesday) ==
- This was the first time in the history of Billboard magazine when five singles appeared in both the pop and R&B Top Ten charts. They were: "Heartbreak Hotel" by Elvis Presley, "Blue Suede Shoes" by Carl Perkins, "Long Tall Sally" by Little Richard, "Magic Touch" by The Platters, and "Why Do Fools Fall in Love?" by Frankie Lymon and the Teenagers.
- Died: Violet Gibson, 79, Irish would-be assassin of Benito Mussolini, after thirty years in a mental hospital.

== May 3, 1956 (Thursday) ==
- The first World Judo Championships were held at the Kuramae Kokugikan, Tokyo, Japan. The host country finished top of the medal table, with Shokichi Natsui taking the gold medal in open competition.
- In the UK, Granada Television began broadcasting, resulting in ITV's output becoming available in Northern England.
- The United States Air Force disclosed that a $41 million guided missile production facility would be built at Sorrento, California, for the Atlas launch vehicle. Convair was announced as the prime contractor.

== May 4, 1956 (Friday) ==
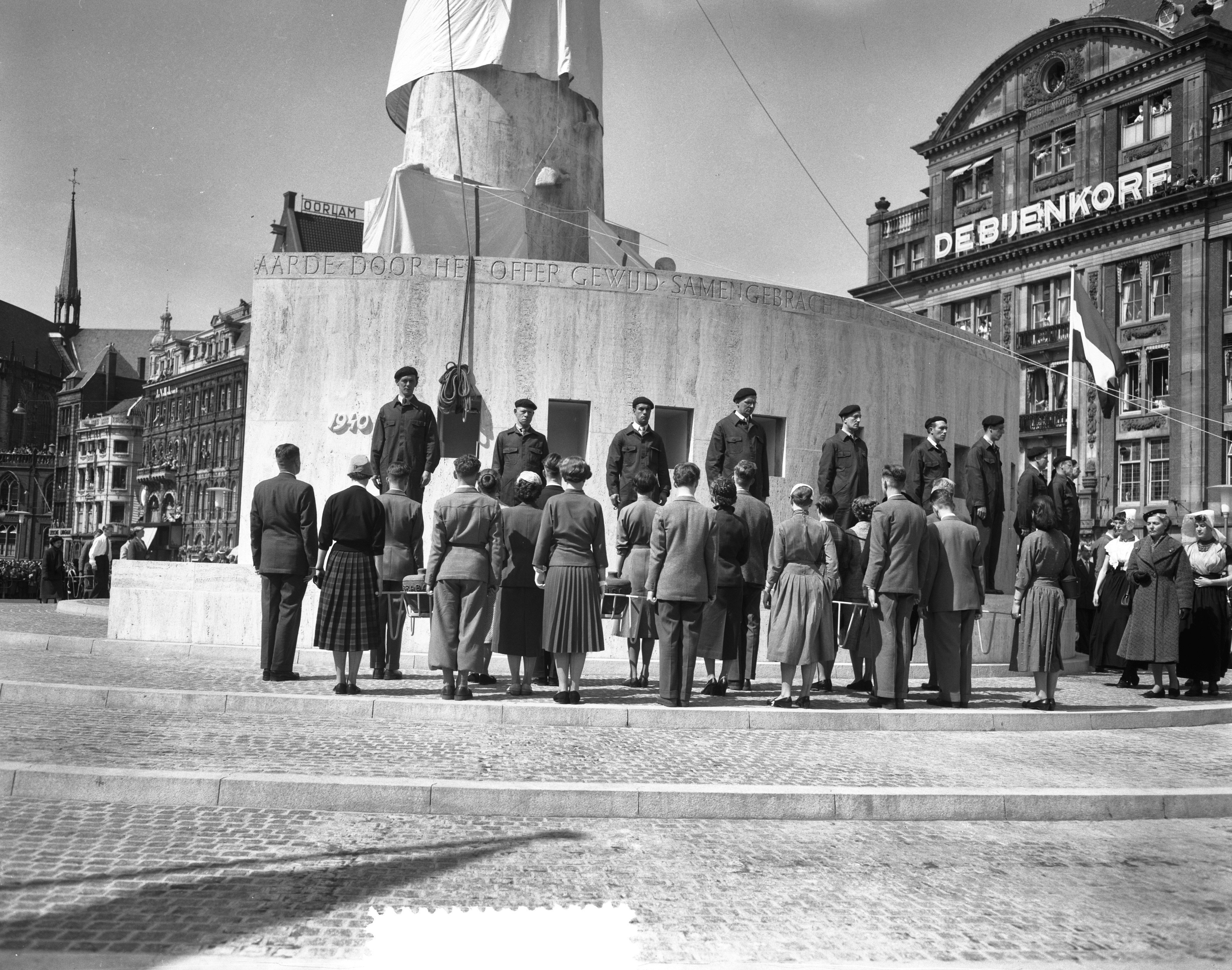
Unveiling of the National Monument

- The National Monument in Dam Square, Amsterdam, was unveiled by Queen Juliana of the Netherlands.

== May 5, 1956 (Saturday) ==
- In the final of the English FA Cup football competition, Manchester City F.C. defeated Birmingham City F.C. 3–1 at Wembley Stadium. It was later discovered that Manchester City's goalkeeper, Bert Trautmann, had broken a bone in his neck during the match, leaving him unable to play for most of the following season.
- The Norwegian cargo ship Erling Borthen collided with the Liberian-registered SS Santa Rosa in the English Channel, resulting in serious damage.

== May 6, 1956 (Sunday) ==
- The 54th Copa del Generalísimo (Spanish Cup) football competition opened.
- The 1956 All-Ireland Senior Football Championship opened with preliminary matches at O'Connor Park, Tullamore, and Geraldine Park, Athy.
- Died: Fergus Anderson, 47, British professional motorcycle racer, was killed in a race crash.

== May 7, 1956 (Monday) ==
- The UK's health minister, R. H. Turton, rejected a proposed government campaign against smoking, on the grounds that the theory that smoking caused lung cancer "has not been proved".

== May 8, 1956 (Tuesday) ==
- John Osborne's play Look Back in Anger received its première at the Royal Court Theatre in London, starring Kenneth Haigh as Jimmy Porter and Alan Bates in his first major role as Cliff. A press release described the dramatist as an "angry young man", a phrase that would come to describe a British working-class literary movement.

== May 9, 1956 (Wednesday) ==
- Toshio Imanishi (Japan) and Gyalzen Norbu (Sherpa) made the first ascent of the Nepalese mountain Manaslu, the eighth highest in the world.
- A referendum was held in British Togoland to decide the colony's future. The result was a majority in favour of integration with Gold Coast, soon to become independent Ghana.
- The Gower Peninsula in Wales became Britain's first designated Area of Outstanding Natural Beauty.
- British coaster Fred Everard collided with another British ship, SS Walstream, off Margate, Kent. Fred Everard sank with the loss of one crew member.
- British T-class submarine HMS Talent was damaged in a collision with an unknown vessel in the Solent.

== May 10, 1956 (Thursday) ==
- The French government sent 50,000 reservists to Algeria.
- Municipal elections in Leeds and Liverpool, UK, resulted in overall wins for the UK Labour Party.

== May 11, 1956 (Friday) ==
- Died: Walter Sydney Adams, 79, American astronomer

== May 12, 1956 (Saturday) ==
- Died: Louis Calhern, 61, American actor, died of a heart attack in Nara, Japan, while filming The Teahouse of the August Moon with Marlon Brando.

== May 13, 1956 (Sunday) ==
- The 1956 Monaco Grand Prix was won by Stirling Moss, driving for Maserati.
- The 1956 Vuelta a España cycle race ended in victory for Angelo Conterno of Italy.
- Born: Sri Sri Ravi Shankar, Indian spiritual leader; in Papanasam, Tamil Nadu

== May 14, 1956 (Monday) ==
- The U.S. steam schooner Howard Olson collided with another U.S. ship, SS Marine Leopard, 175 nautical miles (324 km) south of San Francisco, California. The Howard Olson sank, with the loss of six members of her 28 crew.
- Harry Pollitt resigned as General Secretary of the British Communist Party; Pollitt was suffering from poor health and was replaced by John Gollan.

== May 15, 1956 (Tuesday) ==
- Elections in El Salvador resulted in victory for the Revolutionary Party of Democratic Unification.
- In Orléans, Ontario, Canada, an Avro Canada CF-100 Canuck of the Royal Canadian Air Force crashed into a convent, killing fifteen people, including eleven members of the community of Grey Nuns.
- Six business executives from a firm in Chicago, United States, were killed, along with two crew members, when their company plane crashed near Jeffersonville, Indiana.

== May 16, 1956 (Wednesday) ==
- President Gamal Abdel Nasser of Egypt officially recognised the People's Republic of China; this caused a deterioration in relations with the United States, which continued to support the alternative regime in Taiwan.
- Fighting broke out between French troops and Algerian independence fighters, continuing until 22 May. At the end of the encounter, 24 French soldiers and 67 Algerian rebels were dead.
- Born: Mirek Topolánek, Czech politician (Prime Minister 2006–2009); in Vsetín

== May 17, 1956 (Thursday) ==
- Born:
  - Sugar Ray Leonard, American boxer; in Wilmington, North Carolina
  - Bob Saget, American comedian and actor; in Philadelphia, Pennsylvania (d. 2022, fall)

== May 18, 1956 (Friday) ==
- Lhotse, the world's fourth highest mountain, was successfully climbed for the first time, by Swiss mountaineers Ernst Reiss and Fritz Luchsinger.

== May 19, 1956 (Saturday) ==
- Elections were held in the Australian state of Queensland. The Australian Labor Party was re-elected and Vince Gair retained the premiership.
- The 1956 Giro d'Italia cycle race began in Milan, with 16 teams competing.

== May 20, 1956 (Sunday) ==
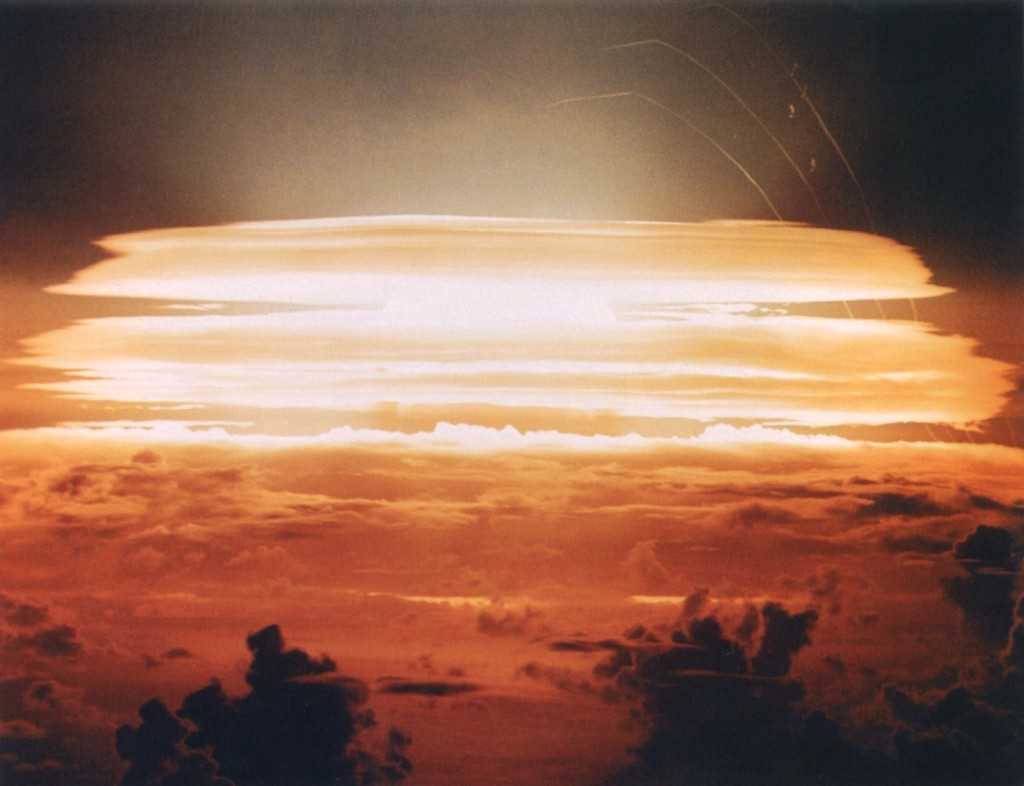
The Redwing Cherokee nuclear detonation

- Operation Redwing: The United States carried out the first air drop of a hydrogen bomb, when a U.S. Air Force B-52 Stratofortress dropped a 3.75-megaton bomb on Bikini Atoll in the Pacific Ocean.
- Died:
  - Max Beerbohm, 83, English essayist, parodist and caricaturist
  - Zoltán Halmay, 74, Hungarian Olympic champion swimmer

== May 21, 1956 (Monday) ==
- The first Cork Film Festival was officially opened in Ireland, by the country's president, Seán T. O'Kelly.
- Democrats Estes Kefauver and Adlai Stevenson II debate in the first televised presidential debate in history, during the 1956 United States Presidential Election.
- Died: Léo Valentin, 37, French adventurer and birdman, fell to his death during a failed stunt in Liverpool.

== May 22, 1956 (Tuesday) ==
- In the United States, the NBC television network used its peacock logo for the first time, to indicate the quality of its colour television broadcasting.
- Swedish teacher Gunnel Gummeson and her American boyfriend Peter Winant were reportedly seen for the last time in Shibarghan, Afghanistan, before going missing. In 1977, Gummeson would be declared presumed dead, probably murdered.

== May 23, 1956 (Wednesday) ==
- Pierre Mendès France resigned as France's Minister of State in protest of the Mollet government's policy on Algeria.

== May 24, 1956 (Thursday) ==
- The first Eurovision Song Contest was broadcast from Lugano, Switzerland, and was won by the host country. The winning song was "Refrain" by Géo Voumard and Émile Gardaz, sung by Lys Assia.
- A partial lunar eclipse took place.
- To celebrate Buddha's Birthday, the 14th Dalai Lama visited India, where he was received by Prime Minister Jawaharlal Nehru.
- Died: Guy Kibbee, 74, American actor

== May 25, 1956 (Friday) ==
- Elvis Presley made his first visit to Detroit, where he appeared at the Fox Theatre at the end of a U.S. tour.

== May 26, 1956 (Saturday) ==
- The French tennis championships, held at Stade Roland-Garros, Paris, ended with Lew Hoad winning the Men's Singles and Althea Gibson as the Women's Singles champion.
- Died: Al Simmons, 54, American baseball player and Hall of Fame member

== May 28, 1956 (Monday) ==
- A Gloster Meteor NF.Mk 11 overshot the runway while taking off from RAF Wahn, West Germany. The two-man crew were unhurt, but the plane was damaged beyond repair.

== May 29, 1956 (Tuesday) ==
- Born: La Toya Jackson, American singer; in Gary, Indiana
- Died: Sir Francis Joseph Edmund Beaurepaire, 65, Australian Olympic swimmer, politician and businessman, died of a heart attack.

== May 30, 1956 (Wednesday) ==
- Pat Flaherty won the 1956 Indianapolis 500 motor race. It was the first event in the 1956 USAC Championship Car season.
- The Dutch coaster Prins Bernhard collided with the West German ship SS Tanger off Folkestone, Kent, and sank. All on board were rescued by the Dover lifeboat.
- The Hong Kong-registered tanker Lucky Carrier, on a voyage from Chalna to Akyab, ran aground at Fakir Point, Burma. The ship was later towed to Singapore where she would be declared a constructive total loss and scrapped.
- Died: George Murray Levick, British Antarctic explorer and naval surgeon (b. 1876)

== May 31, 1956 (Thursday) ==
- The Cunard liner RMS Caronia ran aground at Messina, Sicily; it was refloated the following day.
