= September 1956 =

Month of 1956

<<	September 1956					>>
Su	Mo	Tu	We	Th	Fr	Sa
						1
2	3	4	5	6	7	8
9	10	11	12	13	14	15
16	17	18	19	20	21	22
23	24	25	26	27	28	29
30

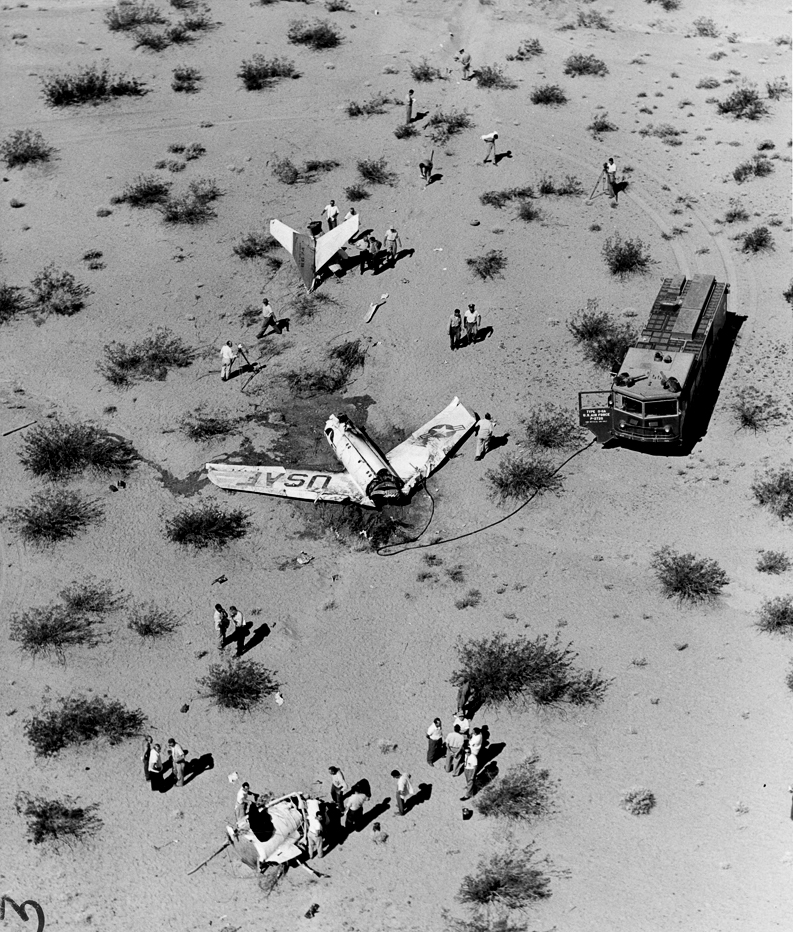
September 27, 1956: Wreckage of Bell X-2 aircraft after test pilot Milburn G. Apt's fatal crash

September 1956 was the ninth month of that leap year. The month which began on a Saturday and ended after 30 days on a Sunday

The following events occurred in September 1956:

== September 1, 1956 (Saturday) ==
- Steam locomotive operations take place for the last time on the Bessemer and Lake Erie Railroad.

== September 2, 1956 (Sunday) ==
- Stirling Moss of the UK wins the 1956 Italian Grand Prix at Monza, Italy, after championship leader Juan Manuel Fangio suffers a mechanical failure. Fangio's Ferrari teammate Peter Collins gives up his car to Fangio, who finishes second and wins the drivers' championship.

== September 3, 1956 (Monday) ==
- U.S. Presidential candidate Adlai Stevenson marches with 75,000 citizens in Detroit's annual Labor Day parade and addresses the crowd, outlining his "New America" plan for education and health.
- Suez Crisis: US President Dwight D. Eisenhower writes to UK Prime Minister Anthony Eden, mentioning the possibility of a threat of armed response. Two days later the contents of the letter are leaked, possibly by Walter Monckton, resulting in Eisenhower calling a press conference.

== September 4, 1956 (Tuesday) ==
- Sweden's television service officially begins with transmissions by Radiotjänst TV.

== September 5, 1956 (Wednesday) ==
- The De Soto County-class tank landing ship USS Suffolk County (LST-1173), built for the US Navy, is launched at the Boston Naval Shipyard, by Mrs Thomas P. O'Neill Jr.

== September 6, 1956 (Thursday) ==
- US poet Richard Eberhart, reporting for The New York Times from San Francisco, publishes an article in the New York Times Book Review identifying Allen Ginsberg's Howl as "the most remarkable poem of the young group" of poets becoming known as the leaders of the Beat Generation.
- Died: Michael Ventris, 34, English philologist who first deciphered the Linear B script, killed in a car accident

== September 7, 1956 (Friday) ==
- Iven C. Kincheloe flies the Bell X-2 to a peak altitude of 126,200 ft (38,466 m), the first time a pilot has exceeded 100,000 ft (30,500 m).
- Liberian cargo ship Seagate runs aground on the Sonora Reef, off the coast of Washington, United States, and the vessel breaks in two.
- Born: Michael Feinstein, American singer and pianist, in Columbus, Ohio

== September 9, 1956 (Sunday) ==
- Elvis Presley appears for the first time on The Ed Sullivan Show, watched by a record audience of approximately 60 million viewers.

== September 10, 1956 (Monday) ==
- On a visit to the UK at the height of the Suez crisis, France's Prime Minister Guy Mollet proposes a merger of France and the United Kingdom. Britain's Prime Minister Anthony Eden rejects the idea.
- Sir Ivone Kirkpatrick, Permanent Under-Secretary at the UK's Foreign Office, writes to the British Ambassador in Egypt, warning that allowing President Gamal Abdel Nasser to consolidate his position will cause the flow of Middle Eastern oil to the UK to dry up, ruining the British economy.
- The gubernatorial election for the US state of Maine is won by the incumbent, Democrat Edmund Muskie, with a majority of 55,859 votes.

== September 11, 1956 (Tuesday) ==
- Typhoon Emma dissipates, after causing extensive damage and loss of life in Japanese and South Korean territory. The number of deaths was estimated at 77, and estimated damage over $8 million.
- In the United States, a blanket primary for the election of Washington's state governor, Albert D. Rosellini (Democrat) and Emmett T. Anderson (Republican) are selected to advance to the general election.
- Born: Tony Gilroy, American screenwriter, director and film producer, in New York City
- Died: Billy Bishop, 62, Canadian World War I flying ace; Lucien Febvre, 78, French historian

== September 12, 1956 (Wednesday) ==
- The Men's and Women's World Volleyball Championships conclude in Paris, France. The Men's championship is won by Czechoslovakia and the Women's by the Soviet Union.
- Born: Leslie Cheung, Hong Kong actor, in Kowloon (died 2003)

== September 13, 1956 (Thursday) ==
- First hard disk drive, IBM 350, part of IBM 305 RAMAC, is shipped. It was invented by an IBM team led by Reynold B. Johnson.

== September 14, 1956 (Friday) ==
- British playwright Harold Pinter marries actress Vivien Merchant in a civil ceremony at Bournemouth, UK.
- Born: Kostas Karamanlis, Greek politician (Prime Minister 2004–2009), in Athens

== September 15, 1956 (Saturday) ==
- The Tupolev Tu-104 jet airliner is introduced into service by Aeroflot on a domestic flight in the Soviet Union from Vnukovo Airport, Moscow, to Omsk and then on to Irkutsk. It replaces the piston-engined Ilyushin Il-14.
- The final tournament of the inaugural AFC Asian Cup football competition ends in victory for South Korea.
- The UK's commercial TV station, ITV, begins broadcasting The Adventures of Sir Lancelot, starring William Russell. It would later be the first British TV series to be produced in colour; this was done to meet the needs of US audiences, and the series was subsequently aired on NBC.
- In Australia, Melbourne wins the 60th Victorian Football League Premiership, beating Collingwood 17.19 (121) to 6.12 (48) in the Grand Final.
- The Liberian-registered Pelagia breaks in two and sinks off the Lofoten Islands, Norway.

== September 16, 1956 (Sunday) ==
- Television broadcasting in Australia begins, with the launch of the country's first TV station TCN-9, transmitting in the Sydney area after two months of tests.
- In the United States, the Chicago South Shore and South Bend Railroad begins operating on a new route, reducing travel time between Gary, Indiana, and Chicago.
- In Sweden's general election, the Swedish Social Democratic Party retains 106 of the 231 seats in the Second Chamber of the Riksdag. The party's leader, incumbent Prime Minister Tage Erlander, forms a majority government in coalition with the Farmers' League.
- The Greek coaster Irene founders south-east of Crete. All ten crew members are rescued by the UK ship Norman Prince.
- Born: David Copperfield, US magician and illusionist, in Metuchen, New Jersey

== September 17, 1956 (Monday) ==
- A Lockheed U-2A, delivered to the CIA on 13 January 1956, crashes while taking off from Wiesbaden Air Base, Germany, when the aircraft stalls at 35,000 feet (11,000 m); Agency pilot Howard Carey is killed.
- An F1 tornado touches down near East Donegal Township, Pennsylvania, damaging small buildings, corn and tobacco and tearing down trees. A 4-year-old on Manheim R1 in East Petersburg is running to his trailer when aluminum sheeting is torn off and strikes the child, rupturing his spleen. His older brother is injured by another piece of metal. The Snavely and Sons roof in Landisville is ripped to pieces. A piece of the roof is wrapped around a telephone pole 50 yards (46 m) away. A Hess farm 2 miles (3.2 km) north-east of Landisville is damaged. A person in the barn of the Hess Farm reports that the tornado sounded like an express train. The farm has a chicken house blown off, and the porch crushed by a tree. A tree falls on an unoccupied cottage at the Landisville Campmeeting Grounds. Near Mount Joy, The Hostetter Farm has a filled tobacco shed lifted from its foundation and dumped 15 feet (4.6 m) away. A shed is blown over at the Lindenuth farm on Donegal Springs Road. Radio and TV aerials are twisted like bales of wire. Basketball hoops on metal poles at the Mount Joy Playground are bent around so they face in the opposite direction. A tree falls onto a truck on Route 230. It is occupied, but the man inside is not injured. Tombstones are blown over in the Mount Joy cemetery.
- A Boeing B-52B Stratofortress of the United States Air Force 93d Bomb Wing crashes after an in-flight fire while returning to Castle AFB, California, having lost a wing. It lands near Highway 99, 9 miles (14 km) SE of Madera, California, resulting in the deaths of five crew members, the other two having bailed out safely.
- Born: Almazbek Atambayev, Kyrgyzstani politician, 3-Time Prime Minister of Kyrgyzstan and 4th President of Kyrgyzstan, in Arashan, Kirghiz SSR

== September 18, 1956 (Tuesday) ==
- The WWE Women's Championship in professional wrestling is established, with The Fabulous Moolah becoming the first champion by defeating Judy Grable in a 13-woman battle royal.
- Died: Adélard Godbout, 63, Canadian politician, Premier of Quebec 1936

== September 20, 1956 (Thursday) ==
- The Jupiter-C research and development vehicle, carrying a modified Redstone ballistic missile, is launched from Cape Canaveral by the U.S. Army Ballistic Missile Agency (ABMA). It carries an 86.5-lb (39.2 kg) payload (including a 30-lb (14 kg) dummy satellite) to an altitude of 680 mi (1,100 km), a speed of 16,000 mph (7 km/s), and a range of 3,300 mi (5,300 km)
- Died: Tom Gastall, 24, US baseball player, killed when the plane he is piloting crashes into Chesapeake Bay as a result of engine problems.

== September 21, 1956 (Friday) ==
- Rigoberto López Pérez, 27, Nicaraguan poet, killed by security forces after shooting the country's dictator, Anastasio Somoza García, in the city of León. In 1981, he would be declared a national hero.

== September 22, 1956 (Saturday) ==
- Born:
  - Debby Boone, US singer, in Hackensack, New Jersey, daughter of singer Pat Boone and his wife Shirley
  - Fritz Fischer, German biathlete, in Kelheim
- Died: Frederick Soddy, 79, English chemist and Nobel Prize laureate

== September 23, 1956 (Sunday) ==
- A tropical storm in the Atlantic develops into Hurricane Flossy, which eventually makes landfall in Florida, United States. Total damage caused by the hurricane in the United States is estimated at $24.8 million (1956 USD).
- Ramat Rachel shooting attack: Soldiers of the Jordanian Legion fire on a group of Israeli archaeologists working inside Israeli territory near Kibbutz Ramat Rachel. Four people are killed and 16 others injured. Jordan officially apologises and blames the incident on a single individual.
- The 1956 All-Ireland Senior Hurling Championship ends with Wexford retaining their title by defeating Cork.
- Born: Paolo Rossi, Italian footballer, in Prato (d. 2020)

== September 24, 1956 (Monday) ==
- The Trinidad and Tobago general election results in a majority for the People's National Movement, led by Eric Williams. Former West Indies cricketer Learie Constantine, representing the PNM, defeats Radio Trinidad announcer Surujpat Mathura to take the seat of Tunapuna, thus embarking on his political career.

== September 25, 1956 (Tuesday) ==
- The submarine transatlantic telephone cable between the United States and the United Kingdom is put into operation.
- Kenya's general election begins; it will last a week to enable those in more remote areas to participate.
- Born: Jamie Hyneman, American special effects technician and television host (MythBusters), in Marshall, Michigan

== September 26, 1956 (Wednesday) ==
- Born: Linda Hamilton, US actress, in Salisbury, Maryland
- Died: Faith Bacon, American burlesque dancer, in Chicago, Cook County, Illinois

== September 27, 1956 (Thursday) ==
- The Bell X-2, piloted by Milburn G. Apt, 32, becomes the first manned aircraft to reach Mach 3. However, Apt experiences "inertia coupling", goes into a spin, fails to eject and is killed.
- Died: Gerald Finzi, 55, British composer ("severe brain inflammation")

== September 28, 1956 (Friday) ==
- The Douglas X-3 Stiletto airplane is retired by the U.S. National Advisory Committee for Aeronautics (NACA) and the United States Air Force.
- Died: William E. Boeing, American aviation pioneer, founder of Boeing (b. 1881)

== September 29, 1956 (Saturday) ==
- Port Adelaide defeat West Adelaide to win their third successive South Australian National Football League premiership, scoring 12.9 (81) to 9.11 (65).
- It is confirmed that Australian rules football will be included as a demonstration sport at the forthcoming Melbourne Olympics.
- Born: Sebastian Coe, English athlete and politician, in London
- Died: Anastasio Somoza García, 60, President of Nicaragua, from gunshot wounds received in an assassination attempt a week earlier.

== September 30, 1956 (Sunday) ==
- Battle of Algiers: Three female members of Algeria's National Liberation Front (FLN), Djamila Bouhired, Zohra Drif and Samia Lakhdari, carry out a series of bombings on civilian targets in European Algiers: bombs planted at a Milk Bar on Place Bugeaud and a Cafeteria on Rue Michelet kill 3 people and injure 50, but a third bomb, at the Air France terminus, fails to explode.
- The Republican Party of India is established; it was the brainchild of Dr B. R. Ambedkar, and the movement would collapse following his death three months later.
- In the United States, Chicago White Sox pitcher Jim Derrington becomes the youngest pitcher in modern baseball history to start a game, at the age of 16 years and 10 months.
