= Kath M. Melia =

Academic with interest in ethics in nursing and healthcare

Professor Kath M. Melia
- Born: Cheshire
- Died: 22 October 2022; Edinburgh
- Occupation(s): sociologist, professor of nursing, researcher, academic author and campaigner for ethics in healthcare
- Employer: University of Edinburgh

Kath M. Melia (died 25 October 2022) was a sociologist, professor of nursing, researcher, academic author and campaigner for ethics in healthcare.

== Career ==
Melia was born in Cheshire, the middle of three sisters. She undertook her undergraduate studies to obtain a BA (Hons) in nursing at Manchester University. She worked in intensive and coronary care. In 1975, she moved to take a PhD at the University of Edinburgh Nursing Research Unit, where she later became lecturer and eventually in 1996 a professor of Nursing Studies. She was the first head of the School of Nursing and Social science for five years, and retired when she had served for 40 years as a lecturer, researcher and then professor. Melia won research funding at a time when few grants were made to nurses, and this included Leverhulme Trust researching nursing ethics in the USA (New York and San Francisco) and an ESRC programme studying 'Nursing in the new NHS'. As Head of the School, Melia led a £2.5m joint bid with Queen Margaret University and Edinburgh Napier University to create a centre for integrated healthcare research which in turn developed into UK-wide Clinical Academic Careers for Nurses, Midwives and Allied Health Professionals.

Melia was visiting scholar to numerous universities including; University of Alberta, University of Vancouver, UCSF (School of Nursing), International Scholar – Hastings Center, New York, Centre for Biomedical Ethics, National University of Singapore, King Edward Memorial Hospital and University of Western Australia, Perth, Institute of Bioethics, University of Monash, Melbourne, University of Navarra Pamplona, Spain, Visiting Professor University College Dublin, and the Swedish School of Nursing, Helsinki, University of Turku, Finland. She was an External Examiner to the Universities of Manchester, Nottingham, Liverpool, King's College London, University of Wales, City University London, University of Tromsø. She supervised in excess of 30 PhD students and was a member of Editorial Boards of the Journal of Sociology of Health and Illness (1985–1989), Qualitative Health Research (1990–1994), Social Sciences in Health: International Journal of Research and Practice (1994–1997).

== Writing ==
Melia's writing about nursing and ethics including in an intensive care context became a part of the nurse education curriculum. She also had identified the stages in the socialisation of nurse students as 'fitting in; learning the rules; getting the work done; and passing through'. She questioned the merits of qualitative research interviews, and the ongoing 'paternalistic' relationship between doctors and nurses, and dissonance between theory and practice.

Her work continued the thinking of Glaser and Strauss on Grounded Theory (1987) which challenged received wisdom in the scientific community. Her own research on 'Learning and Working' was published during that time, when there were serious nurse staff resource shortages in the UK, and the changes of nurse education from hospital based (student as worker) into a tertiary education and academic pathway was being progressed, when routine care may have been seen as menial work. She also studied drop-out from nurse education in China, later.

Her approach to practical ethics for nurse education is now in its 5th edition. Melia attracted criticism from some, for example when she wrote in the Journal of Sociology of Health and Illness, a Review Essay: Imperialism, paternalism and the writing of introductory texts in Medical Sociology.

Her introductory text book on nursing and ethics is still regarded as relevant to UK, German and Irish nursing and healthcare education.

Melia retired in 2015, and became professor emerita.

== Death and legacy ==
She died on 22 October 2022 in Edinburgh, leaving a legacy to the Institute for Regeneration and Repair (IRR) which is interdisciplinary across stem cell biology, tissue and inflammation research. She said in 2019, 'the work of IRR will revolutionise the nature of the treatment of patients with injured hearts.
