= August 1956 =

Month of 1956

<<	August 1956					>>
Su	Mo	Tu	We	Th	Fr	Sa
			1	2	3	4
5	6	7	8	9	10	11
12	13	14	15	16	17	18
19	20	21	22	23	24	25
26	27	28	29	30	31

The following events occurred in August 1956:

== August 1, 1956 (Wednesday) ==
- The UK's Foreign Secretary Selwyn Lloyd, U.S. Ambassador Robert D. Murphy and French Foreign Affairs Minister Christian Pineau meet at 10 Downing Street to discuss the Suez Crisis.

== August 2, 1956 (Thursday) ==
- UK Opposition leader Hugh Gaitskell, says of the nationalisation of the Suez Canal by Egypt: "It is all very familiar. It is exactly the same that we encountered from Mussolini and Hitler in those years before the war."
- Died: Albert Woolson, 106, U.S. centenarian, last surviving Union veteran of the American Civil War

== August 3, 1956 (Friday) ==
- The U.S. athlete Willie Williams breaks the world record for the Men's 100 metres, finishing in 10.1 seconds in an event at Berlin, Germany.

== August 4, 1956 (Saturday) ==
- Columbia Pictures releases its 57th and last film serial, Blazing the Overland Trail, starring Lee Roberts.
- Ira Murchison of the U.S. equals the 100 metres world record set the day before by his compatriot Willie Williams in Berlin.

== August 5, 1956 (Sunday) ==
- The 1956 German Grand Prix is held at Nürburgring and is won by Juan Manuel Fangio. The event was attended by future King of Spain Juan Carlos, who was supporting his relative Alfonso de Portago.

== August 6, 1956 (Monday) ==
- "Columbus Geneva Steel" #35, the last major diesel locomotive constructed by Baldwin-Lima-Hamilton at Eddystone, Pennsylvania, United States, is shipped to its purchaser.
- In the UK, a severe hailstorm in Arundel, Sussex, causes a blockage of the A27 trunk road.

== August 7, 1956 (Tuesday) ==
- U.S. baseball player Ted Williams spits at a mocking fan during a game. He would be fined $5,000 for his conduct.
- Maurice Bourgès-Maunoury, France's Defence Minister, obtains support from Israel for a joint attack on Suez.
- An explosion occurs in Cali, Colombia, caused by the explosion of seven ammunition trucks loaded with 1053 boxes of dynamite, parked in Cali overnight. The country's president, General Gustavo Rojas Pinilla, blames the opposition. Death estimates range from 1,300 to 10,000, in a city that at the time had merely 120,000 inhabitants.

== August 8, 1956 (Wednesday) ==
- Fire breaks out at the Bois du Cazier mine in Marcinelle, Belgium. 262 miners are killed, workers of twelve different nationalities; more than half are Italian.

== August 9, 1956 (Thursday) ==
- About 20,000 women join a protest march in Pretoria, South Africa, directed against the country's pass laws.
- The exhibition This Is Tomorrow, featuring the ICA Independent Group of artists and inspired by the theories of Marshall McLuhan, opens at Whitechapel Art Gallery in London. The collaborators include Richard Hamilton, John Voelcker, John McHale and Magda Cordell.

== August 10, 1956 (Friday) ==
- Russian composer Igor Stravinsky obtains an audience with Giuseppe Cardinal Roncalli, who, as Archbishop of Venice, gives permission for the performance of Stravinsky's Canticum Sacrum in St Mark's Cathedral. The piece was dedicated by Stravinsky "To the City of Venice, in praise of its Patron Saint, the Blessed Mark, Apostle". He conducted the performance himself, a month later.
- Born : Michel Vigné, French voice actor

== August 11, 1956 (Saturday) ==
- 1956 Murray River flood: Following higher than average rainfall in Western Queensland and three months of heavy rain in the Murray-Darling basin, flood waters move down the Murray and Darling and peak at Merbein in Victoria and 12.3 metres (40 ft) at Morgan in South Australia.
- Died:
  - Jackson Pollock, 44, U.S. artist, killed in a car crash, along with a passenger, while driving under the influence of alcohol

== August 12, 1956 (Sunday) ==
- Hurricane Betsy makes landfall in Puerto Rico, the first Atlantic hurricane to strike the island for 24 years. Extensive damage is caused in Aibonito, Comerío and Jayuya; the worst damage is in Yabucoa. Sixteen people are killed.
- Around 5,000 members of the banned Romanian Greek-Catholic Church protest outside Cluj-Napoca Piarists' Church to demonstrate that despite the regime's claims their church survives. Fr. Vasile Chindriș preaches a sermon criticizing the Communist leadership, and all priests involved in the protest are later arrested and imprisoned.
- The All-Ireland Senior Hurling Championship and All-Ireland Football Championship finals are postponed because of an outbreak of polio which has already affected 90 people in Cork.

== August 13, 1956 (Monday) ==
- Lakenheath-Bentwaters incident: Air bases in eastern England, UK, belonging to Britain's RAF and the U.S. Air Force, experience a number of suspected UFO sightings.
- British swimmer Brenda Fisher swims Lake Ontario in a record time of 18 hours 51 minutes.

== August 14, 1956 (Tuesday) ==
- The Dutch coaster Hondsrug sinks 10 nautical miles (19 km) north of Fyn, Denmark; five of the seven people on board are killed.
- Irish novelist Iris Murdoch marries English academic John Bayley at Oxford register office.
- Died: Bertolt Brecht, 58, German playwright (heart attack)

== August 15, 1956 (Wednesday) ==
- Born: Lorraine Desmarais, Canadian jazz pianist, in Montreal

== August 16, 1956 (Thursday) ==
- Representatives of the major countries that use the Suez Canal meet in London to discuss the future ownership and operation of the canal. Egypt does not attend the talks, which last until 23 August.
- Died: Bela Lugosi, 73, Hungarian actor best known for playing Dracula

== August 17, 1956 (Friday) ==
- At the close of the 1956 Democratic National Convention at Chicago in the United States, Adlai Stevenson II is nominated as presidential candidate, with 65.9% of the vote. Estes Kefauver is selected as vice-presidential candidate.
- The Communist Party of Germany is banned by the Federal Constitutional Court of West Germany because of its methods.
- Ho Chi Minh and other officials make a public apology for problems with North Vietnam's land reform program. The estimated number of "landlords" killed since 1954 is between 3,000 and 50,000; 12,000 are released from prisons after the government's apology.
- The Metropolitan Police Murder Squad takes over the investigation of the activities of British doctor John Bodkin Adams, "probably the wealthiest GP in England". Adams was later tried and acquitted, and would return to medical practice within five years.

== August 18, 1956 (Saturday) ==
- A touring English cricket team, under the name "Free Foresters", begins a 2-day match against The Netherlands; it ends in a draw.

== August 19, 1956 (Sunday) ==
- The British coaster Traquair sinks 36 nautical miles (67 km) off Aldeburgh, Suffolk, UK. All eleven crew members are rescued.
- Fire breaks out on the U.S. fishing vessel Argus at Ketchikan, Territory of Alaska, destroying the vessel.

== August 20, 1956 (Monday) ==
- After his appearance at the Newport Jazz Festival in the United States, musician Duke Ellington appears on the cover of Time magazine.
- Born: Joan Allen, American actress, in Rochelle, Illinois

== August 21, 1956 (Tuesday) ==
- Born: Kim Cattrall, English-born Canadian actress, in Liverpool, UK

== August 22, 1956 (Wednesday) ==
- Fighter planes from the People's Republic of China shoot down a Japan-based U.S. Navy aircraft as it flies a night reconnaissance mission over the Taiwan Strait; all 16 aboard are killed.
- The Martin JRM Mars flying boat makes its final passenger flight, piloted by U.S. Navy Lieutenant Commander Virgil Solomon, lands the Marianas Mars at Alameda, California, United States, at the end of a flight from Honolulu, Hawaii.

== August 23, 1956 (Thursday) ==
- At the close of the 1956 Republican National Convention in San Francisco, United States, incumbent President Dwight D. Eisenhower is nominated for re-election, with incumbent vice-president, Richard M. Nixon as his running mate. Nat King Cole is among the speakers at the convention.

== August 24, 1956 (Friday) ==
- A United States Army Shawnee helicopter makes the first non-stop helicopter flight across the United States mainland, having flown 2,610 miles (4,203 km) from San Diego, California, to Washington, D.C.
- A five-stage, solid-fuel rocket test vehicle, the world's first, is launched to a speed of Mach 15 by the NACA Langley Aeronautical Laboratory's Pilotless Aircraft Research Division.
- Died: Kenji Mizoguchi, 58, Japanese film director (leukemia)

== August 25, 1956 (Saturday) ==
- At Jasna Góra Monastery, an estimated million pilgrims take the Jasna Góra "Oaths of the Polish Nation", interpreted as an anti-Communist protest.
- Died: Alfred Kinsey, 62, U.S. sex researcher (heart ailment and pneumonia)

== August 26, 1956 (Sunday) ==
- The Wisconsin 250 motor race is held at Wisconsin State Fair Park Speedway, United States, and is won by Jimmy Bryan, who would end the 1956 USAC Championship Car season as National Champion.
- CS Dinamo București becomes the first Romanian team to participate in the European Cup football tournament, defeating Galatasaray Istanbul at the National Stadium in Bucharest.

== August 27, 1956 (Monday) ==
- The "Clinton Twelve" (Jo Ann Allen, Bobby Cain, Theresser Caswell, Minnie Ann Dickey, Gail Ann Epps, Ronald Hayden, William Latham, Alvah J. McSwain, Maurice Soles, Robert Thacker, Regina Turner and Alfred Williams) attend classes at Clinton High School, Clinton, Tennessee, becoming the first African-American students to desegregate a state-supported public school in the Southeast United States.
- In Egypt, British diplomat John-McGlashan, businessman James Swinburn, and a Maltese citizen, James Zarb, are detained by the authorities and accused of spying.

== August 28, 1956 (Tuesday) ==
- Born: Luis Guzmán, Puerto Rican-American actor and producer

== August 29, 1956 (Wednesday) ==
- Born GG Allin, controversial American punk musician, in Lancaster, New Hampshire (died 1993)

== August 30, 1956 (Thursday) ==
- Mansfield school desegregation incident: The mayor and police chief of Mansfield, Texas, join a crowd of about 300 white protesters in front of Mansfield High School, in an attempt was to prevent the enrollment of the three black students.

== August 31, 1956 (Friday) ==
- Born:
  - Masashi Tashiro, Japanese entertainer, in Saga Prefecture
  - Tsai Ing-wen, President of Taiwan, in Zhongshan District, Taipei
