= April 1956 =

Month of 1956

<<	April 1956					>>
Su	Mo	Tu	We	Th	Fr	Sa
1	2	3	4	5	6	7
8	9	10	11	12	13	14
15	16	17	18	19	20	21
22	23	24	25	26	27	28
29	30

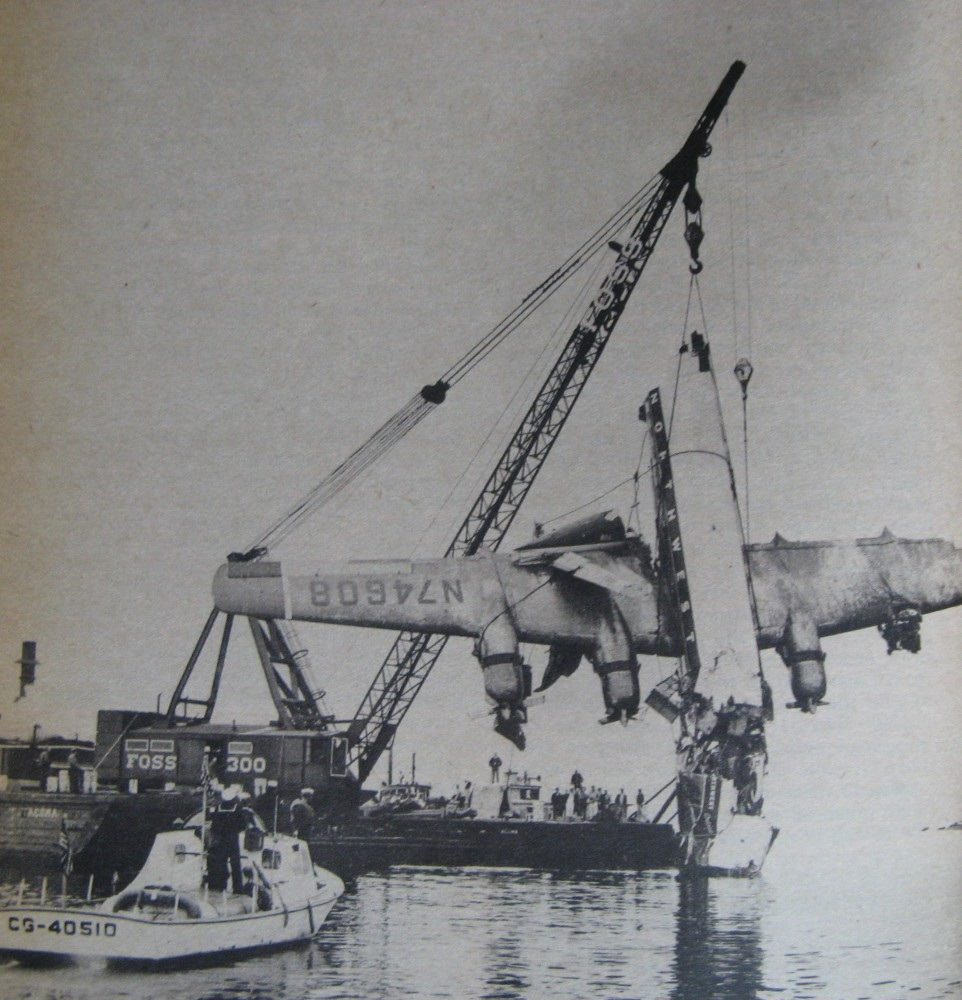
Recovery of Northwest Orient Airlines Flight 2

April 1956 was the fourth month of that leap year. The month began on a Sunday and ended after 30 days on a Monday.

The following events occurred in April 1956:

== April 1, 1956 (Sunday) ==
- Trans World Airlines Flight 400, a Martin 4-0-4, crashed on takeoff from Greater Pittsburgh International Airport in Pennsylvania, United States; 22 of the 36 people on board were killed, including one crew member.

== April 2, 1956 (Monday) ==
- Northwest Orient Airlines Flight 2 was ditched in Puget Sound shortly after takeoff from Seattle-Tacoma International Airport, United States. All 38 people aboard managed to leave the plane, but four passengers and one crew member could not be saved by rescuers.
- The first episode of long-running US TV soap As the World Turns was broadcast on the CBS television network.
- Born: Phillip Journey, American jurist, politician and member of the Kansas Senate from 2003 until 2008; in Kansas City, Kansas

== April 3, 1956 (Tuesday) ==
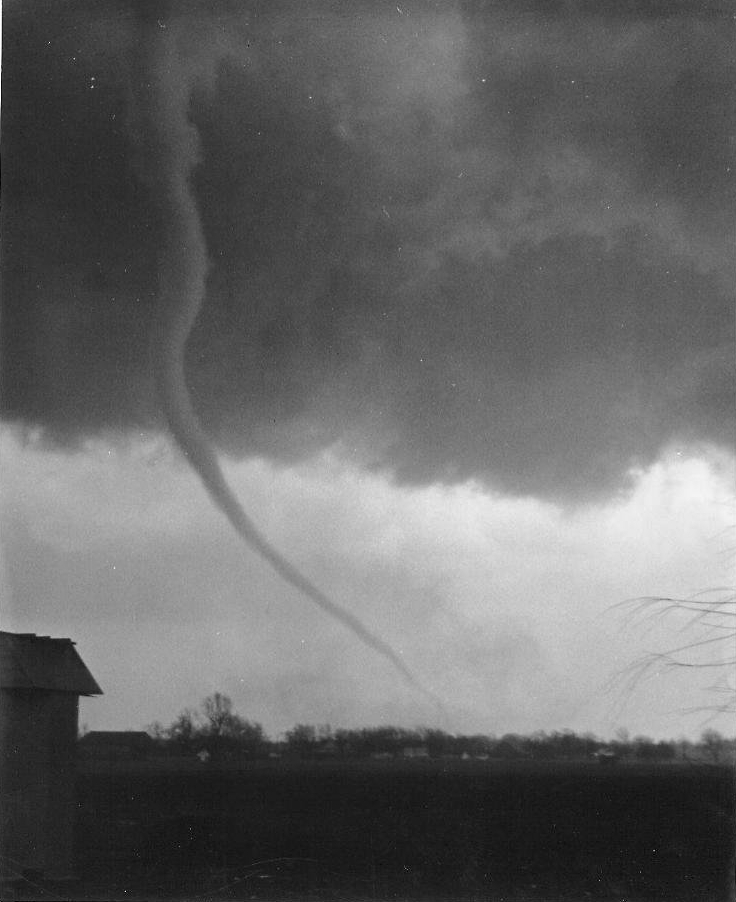
April 3, 1956: Dissipation of the F4 Saugatuck, Michigan, tornado

- At the end of an outbreak that produced 47 tornadoes, including an F5 tornado that devastated the Hudsonville and Standale, Michigan, areas of the United States, 18 people were left dead and 340 injured, and the historic lighthouse at Saugatuck destroyed.

== April 4, 1956 (Wednesday) ==
- Senator Strom Thurmond resigned, keeping a campaign pledge he had made in the United States Senate election in South Carolina, 1954. Thurmond would be unopposed in his bid to complete the remaining four years of the term, thus avoiding a primary election.

== April 5, 1956 (Thursday) ==
- A 120 mm mortar attack on Gaza City by the Israel Defense Forces killed 58 civilians, including 10 children, as a retribution for the killing of three Israeli soldiers by Egyptian forces on the previous day. (→ Death and eulogy of Roi Rotberg).

== April 6, 1956 (Friday) ==
- Elvis Presley signed a three-picture contract with Paramount Pictures.
- Born: Dilip Vengsarkar, Indian cricketer; in Rajapur Maharashtra

== April 7, 1956 (Saturday) ==
- Following the country's independence from France, Spain discontinued the Spanish protectorate in Morocco, ceding its territory to the newly established kingdom.

== April 8, 1956 (Sunday) ==
- The Seyhan Dam and hydroelectric plant was opened in Turkey.
- The National Constituent Assembly of the newly independent Kingdom of Tunisia held its opening session. Habib Bourguiba was elected President of the National Constituent Assembly.
- In the Ribbon Creek incident, six members of U.S. Marine Platoon 71 drowned during a night march at Marine Corps Recruit Depot Parris Island.

== April 9, 1956 (Monday) ==
- The Norwegian Humanist Association was founded.
- Swedish ore carrier MV Akka sank in the Firth of Clyde, Scotland, with the loss of six of her 33 crew.

== April 10, 1956 (Tuesday) ==
- A Nat King Cole concert in Birmingham, Alabama, United States, was interrupted by three Ku Klux Klan members, who pushed Cole from his piano stool; all were later tried and convicted, but Cole would never again perform in his home state.

== April 11, 1956 (Wednesday) ==
- The 1956 World Table Tennis Championships came to an end in Tokyo, Japan. The host country finished with four of the seven available gold medals, Romania with two, and the United States with one.

== April 12, 1956 (Thursday) ==
- Born:
  - Andy García, Cuban actor; in Havana, under the name Andrés Arturo García Menéndez
  - Yasuo Tanaka, Japanese novelist and politician; in Tokyo
- Died: Samuel J. Seymour, 96, last surviving witness of the Assassination of Abraham Lincoln

== April 13, 1956 (Friday) ==
- Vietnamese rebel leader Ba Cụt was arrested by a South Vietnam government patrol, following the defeat of his forces.
- Born: David W. Brown, entrepreneur, AOL founder, created AIM

== April 14, 1956 (Saturday) ==
- Ampex demonstrated the VR-1000, the first of its line of 2 inch Quadruplex videotape recorders, at the 1956 NARTB (now NAB) convention in Chicago, United States. Later the same year, the first television network programme to use the new Ampex Quadruplex recording system would be shown on CBS.
- Born: Barbara Bonney, US soprano; in Montclair, New Jersey

== April 15, 1956 (Sunday) ==
- The 1956 Syracuse Grand Prix was held in Sicily and was won by Juan Manuel Fangio.
- The 65th Argentine Primera División football season began.
- A tornado struck the Greater Birmingham area of Jefferson County, Alabama, United States. Twenty-five people were killed and 400 homes damaged.
- Died: Kathleen Howard, 71, Canadian singer and actress

== April 16, 1956 (Monday) ==
- Born: David M. Brown, US astronaut; in Arlington County, Virginia (died 2003 on the Space Shuttle Columbia)

== April 17, 1956 (Tuesday) ==
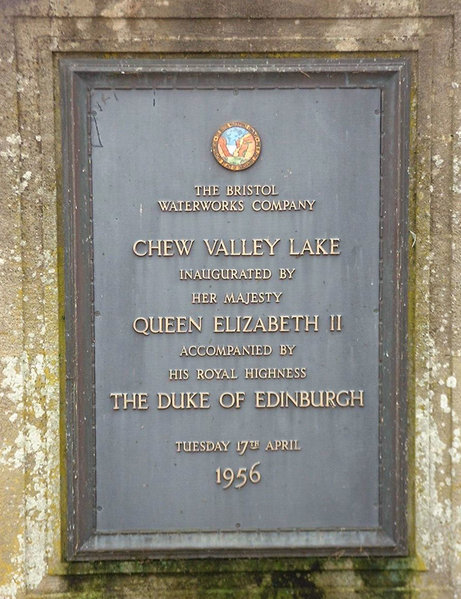
Plaque unveiled by Queen Elizabeth II on April 17, 1956

- The 4.9 km^{2} Chew Valley Lake in Somerset, UK, a new reservoir built by Bristol Water, was officially opened by Queen Elizabeth II of the United Kingdom.
- The UK Chancellor of the Exchequer, Harold Macmillan, announced the launch of Premium Bonds in the United Kingdom.
- Dutch cargo ship MV Altair struck a rock off Borborema, Brazil, and sank. All crew members were rescued.
- Luis Aparicio replaced fellow Venezuelan baseball player Chico Carrasquel as the Chicago White Sox regular shortstop.

== April 18, 1956 (Wednesday) ==
- Maria Desylla-Kapodistria became Greece's first elected female mayor when she was elected in Corfu.

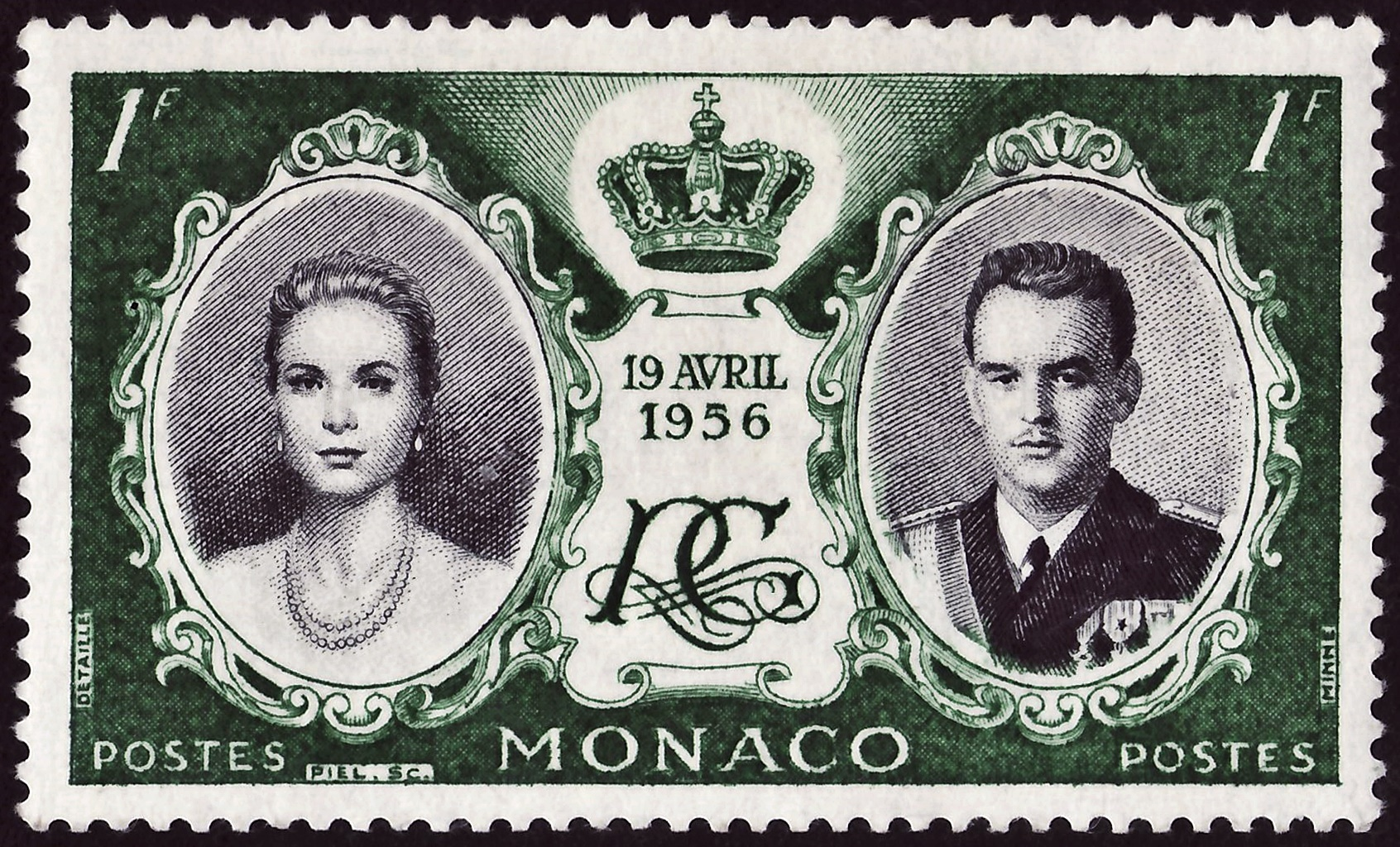
Commemorative stamp for wedding of Rainier III, Prince of Monaco, and Grace Kelly

- American actress Grace Kelly married Rainier III, Prince of Monaco, in a civil ceremony at the Prince's Palace of Monaco.

== April 19, 1956 (Thursday) ==
- British MI6 diver Lionel "Buster" Crabb was sent into Portsmouth harbour to investigate the visiting Soviet cruiser Ordzhonikidze. After diving in, he was never seen again. The UK government declined to give any further information.
- Born: Sue Barker, tennis player and television presenter; in Paignton, Devon, England
- Died: Ernst Robert Curtius, 70, German philologist

== April 20, 1956 (Friday) ==
- Born: Beatrice Ask, Swedish politician; in Sveg

== April 21, 1956 (Saturday) ==
- Typhoon Thelma hit the Philippine Islands.
- Margaret Truman, daughter and later biographer of former US President Harry S. Truman, married journalist Clifton Daniel at Trinity Episcopal Church in Independence, Missouri.
- Died: Charles MacArthur, 60, US playwright and screenwriter

== April 22, 1956 (Sunday) ==
- The 1956 All-Ireland Senior Hurling Championship began with the quarter-finals of the Leinster Senior Hurling Championship.

== April 23, 1956 (Monday) ==
- British writer C. S. Lewis married US poet Joy Gresham in a civil ceremony at the Oxford register office, UK; as a divorcee, Gresham could not marry in an Anglican church.

== April 24, 1956 (Tuesday) ==
- The Australian Navy's new aircraft carrier HMAS Melbourne docked at Fremantle after her six-week maiden voyage from Glasgow, UK, to Australia.

== April 25, 1956 (Wednesday) ==
- The Board of Inquiry into the 1956 Hawker Hunter multiple aircraft accident reported that the primary cause of the accident was a sudden deterioration in the weather, but that it had been an error of judgement to divert the aircraft on the assumption that they could perform a visual landing.
- Born: Dominique Blanc, French actress; in Lyon

== April 26, 1956 (Thursday) ==
- The first-ever ship to use the modern cargo container, named the Ideal X, set sail from New Jersey to Texas, marking the start of a new era of worldwide economics.
- Died: Edward Arnold, 66, US actor, died of a cerebral hemorrhage.

== April 27, 1956 (Friday) ==
- The first round of voting in the Burmese general election took place, resulting in a majority for the Anti-Fascist People's Freedom League, led by U Nu, in the Burmese Chamber of Deputies.
- Portuguese cargo ship SS Luabo sank off the coast of Mozambique, with the loss of fourteen of her 57 crew.
- World heavyweight champion Rocky Marciano announced his retirement, aged 32, from professional boxing without having lost any of his 49 bouts.

== April 28, 1956 (Saturday) ==
- France completed its military withdrawal from Vietnam with the last of the French Expeditionary Force leaving the country.
- The Canadian Pacific Railway discontinued its Imperial Limited passenger service, its premier passenger train between Montreal and Vancouver, which had been running since 1899, because of the loss of its contract with Royal Mail.

== April 29, 1956 (Sunday) ==
- The 13th season of Germany's DFB-Pokal football competition began with a qualifying match between Spandauer SV and FK Pirmasens.

== April 30, 1956 (Monday) ==
- Israeli Chief of Staff Moshe Dayan gave a eulogy for Ro'i Rothberg, a kibbutz security officer killed the previous day near the Gaza Strip.
- The 10th annual draft of the United States National Basketball Association was held in New York City.
- Born: Lars von Trier, Danish film director and screenwriter; in Kongens Lyngby
- Died: Alben W. Barkley, 78, US politician, 35th Vice President of the United States
