= School of Health in Social Science, University of Edinburgh =

Coordinates: 55°56′42″N 3°11′25″W

The School of Health in Social Science is a department within the College of Arts, Humanities and Social Sciences at the University of Edinburgh in Scotland.

The school offers postgraduate degrees in clinical psychology, counselling and psychotherapy, dementia, health and social care and nursing studies, together with an undergraduate honours degree in nursing (Bachelor of Nursing with Honours).
