= July 1956 =

Month of 1956

<<	July 1956					>>
Su	Mo	Tu	We	Th	Fr	Sa
1	2	3	4	5	6	7
8	9	10	11	12	13	14
15	16	17	18	19	20	21
22	23	24	25	26	27	28
29	30	31

July 1956 was the seventh month of that leap year. The month, which began on a Sunday, ended after 31 days on a Tuesday.

The following events occurred in July 1956:

== July 1, 1956 (Sunday) ==
- The government of the Rhodesia commissions an airport at Salisbury; it would later become Harare International Airport when the name of the capital city changed. The airport would be officially opened in February 1957.
- The Federal Land Development Authority is established by the Malaysian government.
- The 1956 French Grand Prix is held at Reims and is won by Peter Collins.

== July 2, 1956 (Monday) ==
- Sylvania Electric Products explosion: A laboratory experiment at Sylvania Electric Products in Bayside, New York, United States, results in an explosion, injuring nine workers, one of whom later dies of thorium poisoning.
- Born: Jerry Hall, US model, in Gonzales, Texas

== July 3, 1956 (Tuesday) ==
- Born: Montel Williams, US media personality, talk show host and actor, in Baltimore, Maryland

== July 4, 1956 (Wednesday) ==
- Hurricane Anna forms in the Gulf of Mexico. In the course of a week, it causes damage in the US states of Florida and Alabama, but there are no associated fatalities.
- The first flight of the U-2 spy plane over the Soviet Union are made by the US Central Intelligence Agency from Wiesbaden in West Germany.

== July 5, 1956 (Thursday) ==
- A wave of strikes is called in Algeria as a protest against French domination.
- The United States launches an Aerobee rocket Aerobee RTV-N-10c from White Sands Missile Range on a sub-orbital aeronomy mission.

== July 6, 1956 (Friday) ==
- Vice President Richard Nixon visits South Vietnam, where he addresses the Vietnamese constituent assembly, saying that "the march of Communism has been halted".
- The British Open golf championship concludes at Royal Liverpool Golf Club, with Australia's Peter Thomson winning the tournament for the third consecutive time.
- The first episode of the televised version of Hancock's Half Hour is broadcast by the BBC in the UK.

== July 7, 1956 (Saturday) ==
- Austrian climbers Fritz Moravec, Josef Larch and Hans Willenpart make the first successful ascent of Gasherbrum II, using the Southwest Ridge.
- Died: Gottfried Benn, 70, German poet

== July 8, 1956 (Sunday) ==
- The Japanese House of Councillors election results in a win for the Liberal Democratic Party won the most seats, but without a majority.
- The British steamship Yewcroft is stranded in dense fog on the rocks of Trevean Cove, Cornwall, UK, while carrying cement from Kent to Bristol.
- French cargo ship Dione collides with Liberian-registered SS Michael off the Goodwin Sands, Kent, UK.
- British cross-channel ferry Lord Warden collides with a French ship, SS Tamba off Cap Gris Nez, Pas de Calais, France.
- French fishing boat collides with the British ship Kenuta off the Eddystone Lighthouse in the English Channel and sinks. The crew members are rescued by Kenuta.
- Died: Giovanni Papini, 75, Italian journalist, essayist, literary critic, poet, and novelist

== July 9, 1956 (Monday) ==
- 1956 Amorgos earthquake: An earthquake of magnitude 7.7 strikes the easternmost island of the Cyclades in the Aegean Sea, also affecting neighbouring Santorini. The earthquake and resultant tsunami kill 53 people.
- 1956 Trans-Canada Air Lines accident: The No. 4 propeller of a Trans-Canada Air Lines Vickers Viscount comes loose over Flat Rock, Michigan, United States and hits the plane's passenger cabin, killing one and injuring five of the 35 people aboard. The airliner lands safely at Windsor, Ontario, Canada. It is the first such accident involving either a turboprop aircraft or a Viscount.
- Born: Tom Hanks, US actor and director, in Concord, California

== July 10, 1956 (Tuesday) ==
- Australia's prime minister, Robert Menzies, speaking in London, states that the Commonwealth Prime Ministers are unanimously in favour of Japan being admitted to the United Nations.

== July 11, 1956 (Wednesday) ==
- Born: Sela Ward, American actress, in Meridian, Mississippi,

== July 12, 1956 (Thursday) ==
- Heitor Villa-Lobos's ballet Emperor Jones, based on Eugene O’Neill's play, The Emperor Jones, is premièred in Ellenville, New York, with the composer conducting.
- Born: Didi Petet, Indonesian actor and producer, in Surabaya (died 2015)

== July 13, 1956 (Friday) ==
- Malev Hungarian Airlines Lisunov Li-2T (registration HA-LIG) on a domestic flight within Hungary is hijacked and forced to fly to Ingolstadt Air Base in Manching, West Germany. The hijackers overcame a KGB agent to gain control of the plane, and were allowed to settle in the United States.
- Died: Ba Cụt, 33, North Vietnamese military commander, publicly guillotined at Cần Thơ.

== July 14, 1956 (Saturday) ==
- The 1956 British Grand Prix is held at Silverstone and is won by Juan Manuel Fangio.

== July 15, 1956 (Sunday) ==
- The United States Air Force establishes the Sixteenth Air Force, to operate from air bases in Spain.
- Born: Ian Curtis, English singer, in Stretford (died 1980)

== July 16, 1956 (Monday) ==
- Ringling Bros. and Barnum & Bailey Circus closes its "Big Tent" show in Pittsburgh, for economic reasons.
- The government of the Republic of China (Taiwan) formally moves the Fujian Provincial Government to Taiwan Province, after losing control of mainland China to the Chinese Communist Party.

== July 17, 1956 (Tuesday) ==
- Elections to the Legislative Assembly of Gold Coast (later Ghana) result in a win for Kwame Nkrumah's Convention People's Party, which takes 71 of the 104 seats.

== July 18, 1956 (Wednesday) ==
- The UK completes the withdrawal of its troops from the Suez Canal, following Egypt's repudiation of the Anglo-Egyptian treaty of 1936.
- Mátyás Rákosi is deposed as General Secretary of the Hungarian Working People's Party and replaced by his close associate Ernő Gerő.

== July 19, 1956 (Thursday) ==
- US President Dwight D. Eisenhower withdraws all American financial aid to Egypt for the building of the Aswan Dam.
- Born: Tomás Hirsch, Chilean politician, in Santiago

== July 20, 1956 (Friday) ==
- Carol Morris, Miss USA, wins the Miss Universe 1956 pageant at Long Beach, California, United States.

== July 21, 1956 (Saturday) ==
- 1956 Anjar earthquake: A magnitude 6.1 earthquake strikes the town of Anjar in Kutch, Gujarat, India, killing a reported 115 people.
- In Australian Rules Football, Melbourne's run of nineteen consecutive wins is ended with a defeat by Footscray Football Club.

== July 22, 1956 (Sunday) ==
- The first UK Albums Chart is published in Record Mirror; Frank Sinatra's Songs for Swingin' Lovers! is the first album to top the chart.

== July 24, 1956 (Tuesday) ==
- After ten years as partners, Dean Martin and Jerry Lewis perform their last comedy show together at the Copacabana nightclub in New York, United States.

== July 25, 1956 (Wednesday) ==
- Italian ocean liner SS Andrea Doria sinks during an Atlantic crossing from Genoa after colliding with the Swedish icebreaker SS Stockholm in heavy fog 72 kilometers (45 mi) south of Nantucket island, United States, killing 46 people, including five crew.
- In baseball, Pittsburgh Pirates outfielder Roberto Clemente becomes the first (and to date only) player to hit a walk-off inside-the-park grand slam, at Pittsburgh's Forbes Field.

== July 26, 1956 (Thursday) ==
- Egypt's President Gamal Abdel Nasser nationalizes the Suez Canal and transfers ownership to the Suez Canal Authority
- Born: Dorothy Hamill, US figure skater, in Chicago
- Died: Louis Raemaekers, 87, Dutch painter and cartoonist

== July 27, 1956 (Friday) ==
- The first Berni Inn restaurant opens, at a pub called The Rummer in Bristol, UK.

== July 28, 1956 (Saturday) ==
- The UK government, under prime minister Anthony Eden, freezes Egypt's financial assets in British banks as a result of the Suez Crisis.

== July 29, 1956 (Sunday) ==
- Ninian Sanderson and Ron Flockhart win the 1956 24 Hours of Le Mans race for the Ecurie Ecosse motor racing team.
- The British ketch Moyana flounders in strong gales off The Lizard, Cornwall, UK. All crew members are rescued by SS Clan Maclean. In the same storm, the cargo ship Teeswood capsizes off Dungeness, Kent, losing one of her sixteen crew, and sinks.
- McKee refinery fire: A fire at a refinery near Sunray, Texas, US, results in the deaths of 19 firefighters.
- Australian prime minister Robert Menzies begins a two-day tour of the United States.
- "Youth Hostel accident": Nineteen teenage climbers, roped together, fall into the crater of Mount Hood, Oregon, United States; one is killed.

== July 30, 1956 (Monday) ==
- President Dwight D. Eisenhower approves a Joint Resolution by the 84th Congress, adopting "In God We Trust" as the official motto of the United States.

== July 31, 1956 (Tuesday) ==
- England cricketer Jim Laker sets a record by taking 19 wickets in a first class match (the previous best was 17) in the fourth Test against Australia at Old Trafford Cricket Ground in Manchester, UK.
- Luzhniki Stadium in Moscow, Russia, is officially opened.
- Parliament resumes in Queensland, Australia, following elections.
- Born: Michael Biehn, US actor, in Anniston, Alabama
