= Gladys Beaumont Carter =

Leading UK nurse and writer (1887–1959)

- Born: 21 April 1887; Stamford, Lincolnshire
- Died: 8 December 1959 (aged 72); London
- Education: London School of Economics
- Occupations: economist, nurse, writer
- Employer: University of Edinburgh
- Known for: redesigning the education of nurses

Gladys Beaumont Carter (21 April 1887 – 8 December 1959) was an English midwife, academic nurse, economist and writer. Her research led to the first academic university department for nursing in Europe at the University of Edinburgh.

== Life ==
Carter was born in Stamford, Lincolnshire in 1887. Her parents were Edith Cecilia Carter (née Beaumont) and Thomas Edward Carter, a general practitioner. She had a younger brother and a sister. She was educated in private schools in England and Brussels, Belgium before attending the North London Collegiate School. From 1917 to 1918, she studied social sciences at the University of Bristol. She made sociology her specialist subject when she studied economics at the London School of Economics from 1918 to 1922, graduating with a BSc (Econ). She then studied midwifery and at the end of 1923 went to work as a midwife and health visitor for the City of Westminster Health Society. In 1925, she trained in nursing at London's King's College Hospital, and in 1928 became a state registered nurse.

By 1930, she was teaching midwifery and had started campaigning for higher educational standards in nursing. She was unusual in being both a graduate and a nurse, and she believed this combination was the future. She apologised in the Nursing Times for applying economics to nursing but said that this was necessary beyond "vocation" and "self sacrifice". Nurses were learning how to cope and not how to assist in a better medical service.

In 1934, she became the Organising Secretary of the Royal College of Midwives, then called the Midwife's Institute. She was the Education Officer and revised and published The Midwife's Dictionary and Encyclopaedia in 1934 and again in 1939.

In 1938, she published A New Deal for Nurses. She wrote about the effect of rigid hierarchies and outdated discipline which encouraged bullying and created barriers to progress and recruitment of nurses. She wrote about the ceremonies and forms created by matrons and ward sisters that created mental health issues for their subordinates.

Carter began work with the University of Edinburgh in 1953. She had been teaching at the University of Toronto but returned to do research funded by the Boots company. She was the first nurse to receive a research grant and her work was supported by the Scottish branch of the Royal College of Nursing and the University of Edinburgh. From 1952, she reviewed the existing course for tutors of nursing in Edinburgh and compared it with three alternative courses in England. In 1956, the University opened the first department of nursing in Europe for academic study. The new course was two years long and all students were required to meet the entrance requirements of the University. The course and department were inspired by Carter's work, a University working party and a 1955 grant from the Rockefeller Foundation.

Carter joined the University of Edinburgh's Medical faculty.

== Death and legacy ==
Carter became ill in 1956 and died at King's College Hospital, London, on 8 December 1959.

Elsie Stephenson, who did not have an academic nursing background, became the first director of the Nursing Studies Unit at the University.

In 1954, Carter compiled, in collaboration with Gladys H. Dodds, A Dictionary of Midwifery and Public Health. A second edition was published posthumously in 1963.
