= Annie Altschul =

British mental health nurse and professor (1919–2001)

Annie Altschul CBE
- Born: 18 February 1919; Vienna, Austria
- Died: 24 December 2001 (aged 82); Edinburgh, Scotland
- Education: BA, MSc, RGN, RMN, RNT
- Occupation: Professor of Nursing
- Known for: mental health nursing research, education and advocacy
- Notable work: Psychiatric Nursing (1957); Psychology for Nurses (1962)
- Honours: CBE:Commander of the British Empire (1983) Fellow of the Royal College of Nursing (1978)

Annie Therese Altschul, CBE, BA, MSc, RGN, RMN, RNT, FRCN (18 February 1919 – 24 December 2001) was Britain's first mental health nurse pioneer; a midwife, researcher, educator, author and a patient advocate, emeritus professor of nursing.

== Early years and interests ==
She was born in Vienna, Austria, on 18 February 1919 to Ludwig and Marie Altschul. She was five years old when her father was killed in a railway accident. Altschul was studying mathematics at the University of Vienna when she had to leave Austria in March 1939, then coming under Nazi rule.

Altschul came to London with her mother, sister and young nephew. Altschul worked first as a nanny to learn English before qualifying as a general nurse and midwife—initially in Ealing (which she described as "toffee-nosed"), later in Epsom County Hospital (where "a tutor treated students as idiots"). Altschul's career then took off after she trained as a nurse for the mentally ill in the early 1940s at the Army Mental Hospital which had been set up at Mill Hill school in London, where she found staff and students were more motivated.

Altschul later said that psychiatric nurses "recruit themselves" and that "people who take to psychiatric nursing are different from those who want to be general nurses". Altschul believed that psychiatric nurses have an "affinity for the underdog". Altschul's thinking was influenced by John Bowlby and she continued her own lifelong learning and also encouraged education for all.

Later in life she suffered mental health issues herself and was nursed back to health, in Edinburgh. Altschul used that experience to educate others as well, writing in a 1985 collection titled Wounded Healers: Mental Health Workers' Experiences of Depression. To relax, Altschul enjoyed music, especially opera, cooking and playing bridge.

== Career ==
Altschul's formal training as a nurse and midwife began at Epsom County Hospital. She was entered on the register of nurses on 23 June 1943. In 1946, she became a staff nurse at the Maudsley Hospital, a psychiatric centre, later promoted to sister and then nurse tutor, completing her tutor's diploma at Battersea College of Technology (now Surrey University) and proud of being an alumna (an 'Old Bat'), and also took a degree in psychology at Birkbeck College. Altschul took to teaching nurse students outdoors at Mill Hill where the Maudsley and Bedlam psychiatric hospitals were evacuated to and remained into the 50's.

In 1957, Altschul published her perceptions of what mental health nursing should be in her first book Psychiatric Nursing, and in 1962 Psychology for Nurses, both of which were among the most frequently cited even at the time of her death in 2001. Altschul produced 35 editions and versions, translated into 3 languages, based on the latest research thinking, with co-authors, publishing in 1994, Altschul's psychiatric and mental nursing.

From 1962 to 1964, Altschul served on the Platt Committee on Nursing Education, for the Royal College of Nursing (RCN),. Led by Harry Platt it investigated the loss of trained nurses or the failure to attract new candidates, resulting in the influential Platt Report 1964 andadopted by RCN for the Reform of Nurse Education (1964). Altschul had taken a sabbatical in 1961–62, visiting the United States, funded by a British Commonwealth for Nurses Scholarship Fund to explore psychiatric nurse education and practices, which influenced her thinking.

In 1964, Altschul left the Maudsley to be a World Health Organisation funded lecturer in the Department of Nursing Studies at the University of Edinburgh, where she became a senior lecturer then professor and head of unit, a leader in (then 'ground breaking') integration of degree level nursing education and practical studies, and research leadership, which met some resistance from the medical establishment.

Altschul's own MSc. thesis, entitled 'Measurement of patient-nurse interaction in relation to in-patient psychiatric treatment', was supervised by Elsie Stephenson in 1967. In 1972, Altschul wrote a book Patient-Nurse Interaction, and in 1976 she became Professor and Chair of Nursing Studies. Altschul was appointed to the Mental Health Commission in Scotland as patient advocate and in the same year (1978) was made one of the first Fellows of the Royal College of Nursing. Altschul remained at the University of Edinburgh until her retirement in 1983, developing nurse education further into post-graduate Masters in Nursing Administration, Nurse Education and Health Education, and expanded research portfolios up to higher levels in nursing and affiliated professions.

Altschul also did a mathematics degree at the Open University, was involved in assessing the joint education of architects and engineers, and was a volunteer teacher of mathematics at a local primary school (for under 11 year olds).

== Observations ==
Professor Altschul observed the effects when patients were moved to smaller accommodations during the redecoration of the large wards at Dingleton Hospital in the Scottish Borders. Altschul observed that the closer interaction between nurses and patients resulted in less hyperactivity and less need for certain types of medications. Throughout her career and research work, Altschul emphasised the critical role of the patient-nurse relationship in the therapeutic environment to support improvements in health and wellbeing. Perhaps in advance of her day she debated patient-advocacy, a 'consumer's voice', in the role nursing staff play in psychiatric care in 1983.

== Honours/legacy ==
Altschul was one of the first Fellows of the Royal College of Nursing in 1978. Altschul was appointed Commander of the Order of the British Empire (CBE) in the 1984 New Year Honours. She established the Professor Annie Altschul Publication Prize.

Five weeks before she died, the University of Edinburgh and the Royal College of Nursing UK Centre for the History of Nursing held a 'festschrift' celebration of writings, where Altschul joined in lively debates with current nurse researchers and professors, based on her 1961-62 papers.

Altschul's "social inclusion and user involvement" in psychiatric treatment is still cited (2009).

Altschul died on Christmas Eve (24 December) 2001 aged 82, and an obituary remarked that she had "gained academic acclaim for mental health nursing" and "inspired general as well as psychiatric nurses". Another obituary noted that Altschul's "contribution and intellect" was held as being "of the highest order" also "by eminent psychologists and psychiatrists".

Altschul and a few other key nurses who fled the Holocaust were considered as making a "defining impact" on Britain's health service.

Altschul played a part in the history of mental health nursing and was described as "one of the most outstanding mental health nurses of the 20th century".
