= Nursing Studies, University of Edinburgh =

Academic department

Coordinates: 55°56′43″N 3°11′26″W

Nursing Studies is an academic unit within the School of Health in Social Science at University of Edinburgh. A teaching unit was established in 1956, the first to be part of a British university. The unit's initial focus was on education for nursing teachers and leaders. In 1960 it offered the first degree courses in nursing in the UK. It became a department of the university in 1965 and six years later gained a Chair of Nursing Studies, which was the first to be established in Europe. The unit also had a Nursing Research Unit, which opened in 1971 and ran for more than twenty years. The unit continues to offer nurse education at undergraduate, postgraduate and research levels.

== History ==
By the early 20th century nursing education in North America had seen links develop between universities and hospitals but these sorts of arrangements didn't emerge in Europe until decades later. From 1946 the Scottish Board of the Royal College of Nursing had organised post-registration teaching for nurses that led to a sister-tutor certificate. The teachers for this course were from the University of Edinburgh, who also ran the examinations and were the body that awarded the certificates. Goddard's Work of Nurses in Hospital Wards report, published in 1953 by the Nuffield Provincial Hospitals Trust, had led to some activity in Scotland to improve the training of nurses. Gladys Beaumont Carter who was an economist, a nurse and published writer returned from teaching in Canada to be the first nurse to receive a research grant and her work was supported by the Scottish branch of the Royal College of Nursing, the Boots company and Edinburgh University. From 1952 and for three years she reviewed the existing course for tutors of nursing in Edinburgh and compared that with three alternative courses in England to create new recommendations for the teaching of nursing.

In July 1955 it was reported at a meeting at the University of Edinburgh that the Rockefeller Foundation was to provide a grant of £30,000 over a five-year period with the aim of setting up a new unit to support the education of nurses. In November 1955, a World Health Organization (WHO) study group on the education of nurses met in Brussels and made several recommendations, including that "At least one experimental school of nursing be set up in each country."

The Nurse Teaching Unit (NTU) was established in 1956 within the Faculty of Arts at the University of Edinburgh. This was the first nurse teaching unit within a British university. Support also came from the WHO and the Royal College of Nursing. Elsie Stephenson took up her appointment of Nurse Director on 1 June 1956. The following year it was renamed the Nursing Studies Unit. The first courses were for qualified nurses, aimed at producing teachers and leaders. The first diplomas were awarded to thirteen nurses in 1958.

In 1960 the department announced they had been preparing an integrated degree course that would take students five years to complete. This integrated degree differed from other qualifications available at the time, by combining a nursing qualification and a social science degree. Although other British universities were also beginning to couple qualifications with registration, Edinburgh were the first in the UK to offer a nursing degree course. To enhance motivation, a short 4-week period of patient contact took place before university started, to enable students to participate in basic nursing tasks.

In 1962 an international school of advanced nursing studies was established at the unit, with support from the WHO.

In 1963 Nursing studies was brought into the new Faculty of Social Sciences, together with ten other departments. In 1965 it became a department. By 1968 several hospital-based nursing schools in England and Wales were collaborating with universities, but Edinburgh was still the only department of nursing at a UK university, with 63 students enrolled in the various programmes. By 1972, Margaret Scott-Wright had become the first professor of nursing and eight of the department's nine staff were registered nurses. In the mid-nineties various organisations looked at the standards around masters-level education in nursing and the department made changes to the courses that were offered.

In 2002 the University of Edinburgh began some significant restructuring, with many departments being dissolved. Nursing Studies became part of the School of Health in Social Science, and provides nurse education in both undergraduate and postgraduate studies. The current undergraduate degree, Bachelor of Nursing with honours, is a 4-year programme which leads to eligibility for registration as an Adult Nurse with the Nursing and Midwifery Council (NMC).

In 2012 author Nicola White became a Writer in Residence with the Nursing Studies department. As of 2013 the course has an intake of 35 people a year.

2016 was also the 60th year of the departments history. In April 2016, to coincide with Nursing Studies’ Diamond Jubilee year, Nursing Studies supported the International RCN Research Society Conference to be hosted in Edinburgh. Pam Smith, Professorial Fellow in Nursing Studies held the keynote speech on Day 1; 'Nursing @ the Extremes: Navigating the Emotions of Care'. This important anniversary was also celebrated within the university. The Princess Royal and University of Edinburgh Chancellor, visited Nursing Studies to unveil a plaque to commemorate the Diamond Jubilee and view a poster exhibition demonstrating how the Department has contributed to nursing excellence over the last 60 years.

== Nursing research unit ==
In October 1971 the Nursing Research Unit opened, in two converted flats in Buccleuch Place in Edinburgh. The Scottish Home and Health department had agreed to the unit for an initial period of seven years. It was the first nursing research unit at a British University and Lisbeth Hockey was appointed as director. Penny Prophit was the director from 1983 to 1989. After her resignation a research award was reviewed. With the Scottish Office moving funding to the Nursing Research Initiative for Scotland, the Nursing Research Unit closed in 1994 although the Nursing Studies department continue to have active research programmes.

== Chair of Nursing Studies ==
The Chair of Nursing Studies was created in 1971, the first of its kind in Europe. Scott-Wright, who had been the director at the department since 1968 was appointed to this chair and held the position until 1976. Annie Altschul had been a lecturer, then senior lecturer before holding the position of Chair of Nursing Studies from 1976 until she retired in 1983.

List of Professors of Nursing Studies

- 1971–1976: Margaret Scott-Wright; first incumbent
- 1976–1983: Annie Altschul
- 1996–2015: Kath Melia
- 2017–present: Aisha Holloway

== Ranking ==
In The Guardian's University guide for 2017, Nursing Studies at Edinburgh was top of the league table for nursing & midwifery. Over the previous decade it consistently topped that guide.
