= Protocol of Sèvres =

1956 international conspiracy against Egypt

The Protocol of Sèvres (French, Protocole de Sèvres) was a secret agreement reached between the governments of Israel, France, and the United Kingdom during discussions held between 22 and 24 October 1956 in Sèvres, France. The protocol concerns their joint political and military collusion to topple the Egyptian leader Colonel Gamal Abdel Nasser, by invading and occupying the Suez Canal zone in response to President Nasser's nationalization of the Suez Canal on 26 July. The planning for and the agreements contained in the protocol began the Suez Crisis on 29 October 1956.

== Sèvres meeting ==
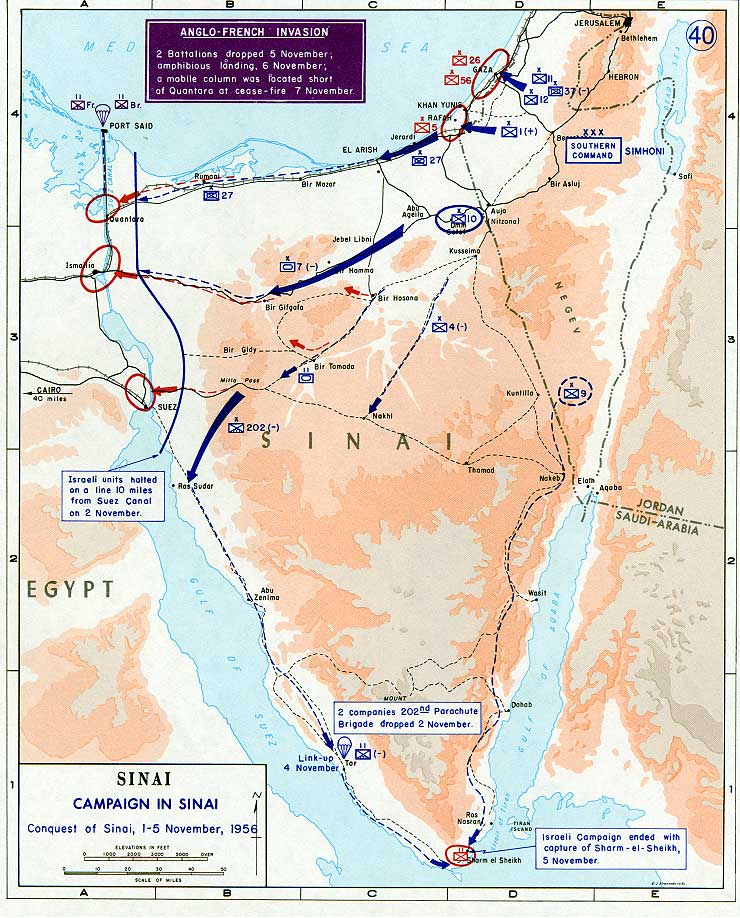
Anglo-French invasion map.

On 22 October 1956, Israeli Prime Minister David Ben-Gurion, Director General of the Ministry of Defense Shimon Peres, and Chief of Staff of the Israel Defense Forces Moshe Dayan secretly travelled from Israel to an isolated house in Sèvres to meet with the French Minister of Defence Maurice Bourgès-Maunoury, Minister of Foreign Affairs Christian Pineau, and Chief of Staff of the French Armed Forces General Maurice Challe, and British Foreign Secretary Selwyn Lloyd and his assistant Sir Patrick Dean.

Together, they and their aides secretly planned a two-step invasion of Egypt, including the cover story. Israel would first attack Egypt in the Sinai, and Britain and France would then invade on the pretext of "separating the combatants" and protecting the canal under the terms of a 1954 Anglo-Egyptian agreement to withdraw all British forces from Egypt. One of the most painstaking aspects was formulating a plan to which both Britain and Israel could agree. The Israelis distrusted the British, but the French were not prepared to act without their British allies and so Israel was forced to deal with Britain. The British maintained strong links with a number of Arab countries and did not want any involvement with Israel that might damage them.

After 48 hours of negotiations and compromise, the seven-point agreement was signed by Ben-Gurion, Pineau and Dean. At the insistence of the Israeli diplomats, who wanted to prevent being abandoned in the middle of the invasion, each group left Sèvres with a signed copy, written in French.

Although they were not part of the protocol, the occasion allowed Israel to secure French commitments to constructing the Negev Nuclear Research Center and to supplying natural uranium.

== Lead-up discussions, motivations and proposals ==
According to the Israeli historian Avi Shlaim,

“Rumours and accusations of collusion started flying around as soon as the Suez War broke out but no hard evidence was produced at the time, let alone a smoking gun.... A number of participants have written about the meeting in their memoirs.... But the principal, most prolific, and most reliable chronicler of the proceedings of the Sèvres conference is Colonel Mordechai Bar-On, chief of bureau of the IDF chief of staff, who served as the secretary of the Israeli delegation and took copious notes throughout. In 1957, at Dayan’s request, Bar-On, who had a degree in History, wrote a detailed account of the events that led to the Suez War with access to all the official documents”.

On 14 October 1956, General Maurice Challe, the deputy chief of staff of the French armed forces, made the suggestion that "Israel would be invited to attack the Egyptian army in Sinai and pose a threat to the Suez Canal and this would provide Britain and France with the pretext to activate their military plans and occupy the Suez Canal Zone, ostensibly in order to separate the combatants and protect the canal."

”The only aspect of the Challe scenario that Eden did not like was the idea of Britain inviting Israel to move against Egypt. He preferred Israel to move of her own accord; he did not want Britain to be implicated in anything that might be construed as collusion in an alliance with Israel against an Arab country.... Ben-Gurion was greatly excited by the prospect of a military partnership with the great powers against Egypt but extremely suspicious of the British in general and of Sir Anthony Eden in particular.... Although he knew that the plan to attack Egypt originated with General Challe, he repeatedly referred to it as ‘the English plan’.... Moreover, he greatly resented the suggestion that Israel should be used as a prostitute in providing services for the great powers. What he deeply longed for was a partnership between equals and an explicit co-ordination of military plans, preferably at a face-to-face meeting with Eden.”

On 22 October 1956 David Ben-Gurion, Prime Minister of Israel, gave the most detailed explanation ever to foreign dignitaries, of Israel's overall strategy for the Middle East. Shlaim called this Ben-Gurion's "grand design". His main objection to the ‘English plan’ was that Israel would be branded as the aggressor while Britain and France would pose as peace-makers.

”Instead he presented a comprehensive plan, which he himself called ‘fantastic’, for the reorganization of the Middle East. Jordan, he observed, was not viable as an independent state and should therefore be divided. Iraq would get the East Bank in return for a promise to settle the Palestinian refugees there and to make peace with Israel while the West Bank would be attached to Israel as a semi-autonomous region. Lebanon suffered from having a large Muslim population which was concentrated in the south. The problem could be solved by Israel’s expansion up to the Litani River, thereby helping to turn Lebanon into a more compact Christian state. The Suez Canal area should be given an international status while the Straits of Tiran in the Gulf of Aqaba should come under Israeli control to ensure freedom of navigation. A prior condition for realizing this plan was the elimination of Nasser and the replacement of his regime with a pro-Western government which would also be prepared to make peace with Israel. Ben-Gurion argued that his plan would serve the interests of all the Western powers as well as those of Israel by destroying Nasser and the forces of Arab nationalism that he had unleashed. The Suez Canal would revert to being an international waterway. Britain would restore her hegemony in Iraq and Jordan and secure her access to the oil of the Middle East. France would consolidate her influence in the Middle East through Lebanon and Israel while her problems in Algeria would come to an end with the fall of Nasser. Even America might be persuaded to support the plan for it would promote stable, pro-Western regimes and help to check Soviet advances in the Middle East.”

Particularly noteworthy is the last point for it was included at Ben-Gurion's specific request, and it defined Israel's territorial aims, which were only tenuously related to the Suez Canal crisis:

”Israel declares its intention to keep her forces for the purpose of permanent annexation of the entire area east of the El Arish-Abu Ageila, Nakhl-Sharm el-Sheikh, in order to maintain for the long term the freedom of navigation in the Straits of Eilat and in order to free herself from the scourge of the infiltrators and from the danger posed by the Egyptian army bases in Sinai. Britain and France are required to support or at least to commit themselves not to show opposition to these plans. This is what Israel demands as her share in the fruits of victory.

October 24 was the third and last day of the conference. Ben-Gurion finally made up his mind to commit the IDF to the battle. In his diary, he summarised the main considerations that led to that fateful decision. He thought that the operation had to be undertaken if Israel's skies could be effectively defended in the day or two that would elapse until the French and the British started bombing Egypt's airfields. The aim of destroying Nasser had pervaded the entire conference and was uppermost in Ben-Gurion's mind. "This is a unique opportunity," he wrote, "that two not so small powers will try to topple Nasser, and we shall not stand alone against him while he becomes stronger and conquers all the Arab countries.... and maybe the whole situation in the Middle East will change according to my plan."

"France and Britain have a vital interest in the Suez Canal," he said forcefully. ‘"The Straits of Tiran are the State of Israel’s Suez Canal.... We intend to capture the Straits of Tiran and we intend to stay there and thus ensure freedom of navigation to Eilat."

The British officials then asked a number of questions about Israel's operational plans, which were evidently inspired by the fear that the Israeli operation would not amount to a real act of war and that Britain would thus not have a credible casus belli for military intervention. Would Israel issue a formal declaration of war? Ben-Gurion replied that Egypt's repeated violations of the armistice agreement made a declaration of war superfluous. Dayan retorted more bluntly: "We will not declare – we will simply strike!"

In his diary, Ben-Gurion recorded the next day: "I told him about the discovery of oil in southern and western Sinai, and that it would be good to tear this peninsula from Egypt because it did not belong to her, rather it was the English who stole it from the Turks when they believed that Egypt was in their pocket. I suggested laying down a pipeline from Sinai to Haifa to refine the oil and Mollet showed interest in this suggestion."

Ilan Troen, director of the Ben-Gurion Research Institute and Archives, omits the plan, codenamed "Fantastic" by Ben-Gurion, from his account of Sèvres and instead offers as the Israeli motivation for the invasion of Egypt:

"Conventional scholarship and the testimony of Israeli leaders, particularly Ben-Gurion, was that the large-scale Egyptian arms deal in September 1955 with the Soviet ally, Czechoslovakia, was the catalyst that confirmed that the anticipated 'second round' of war with Egypt was inevitable and probably in the offing. Israel, fearing that the balance of power with the Arab states would turn against her, began to prepare for conflict, including the possibility of a preemptive strike. Nasser’s decision to limit the rights of passage through the Straits of Tiran and continuing border problems provided justification for action."

== Text ==
An English translation of the Protocol includes the following:

The results of the conversations which took place at Sèvres from 22–24 October 1956 between the representatives of the Governments of the United Kingdom, the State of Israel and of France are the following:

1. The Israeli forces launch in the evening of 29 October 1956 a large scale attack on the Egyptian forces with the aim of reaching the Canal Zone the following day.
2. On being apprised of these events, the British and French Governments during the day of 30 October 1956 respectively and simultaneously make two appeals to the Egyptian Government and the Israeli Government on the following lines:
  1. To the Egyptian Government
    1. halt all acts of war.
    2. withdraw all its troops ten miles from the Canal.
    3. accept temporary occupation of key positions on the Canal by the Anglo-French forces to guarantee freedom of passage through the Canal by vessels of all nations until a final settlement.
  2. To the Israeli Government
    1. halt all acts of war.
    2. withdraw all its troops ten miles to the east of the Canal.
  In addition, the Israeli Government will be notified that the French and British Governments have demanded of the Egyptian Government to accept temporary occupation of key positions along the Canal by Anglo-French forces.
  It is agreed that if one of the Governments refused, or did not give its consent, within twelve hours the Anglo-French forces would intervene with the means necessary to ensure that their demands are accepted.
  3. The representatives of the three Governments agree that the Israeli Government will not be required to meet the conditions in the appeal addressed to it, in the event that the Egyptian Government does not accept those in the appeal addressed to it for their part.
3. In the event that the Egyptian Government should fail to agree within the stipulated time to the conditions of the appeal addressed to it, the Anglo-French forces will launch military operations against the Egyptian forces in the early hours of the morning of 31 October.
4. The Israeli Government will send forces to occupy the western shore of the Gulf of Aqaba and the group of islands Tirane and Sanafir to ensure freedom of navigation in the Gulf of Aqaba.
5. Israel undertakes not to attack Jordan during the period of operations against Egypt. But in the event that during the same period Jordan should attack Israel, the British Government undertakes not to come to the aid of Jordan.
6. The arrangements of the present protocol must remain strictly secret.
7. They will enter into force after the agreement of the three Governments.

(signed)

David Ben-Gurion Patrick Dean Christian Pineau

== British denial ==
Although reports of the arrangement had leaked out within days, British Prime Minister Anthony Eden later denied the existence of such an agreement. When the existence of signed copies of the secret protocol was leaked, Eden sent Dean back to France on 25 October to collect all copies and to leave no trace of the agreements. Christian Pineau at the Quai d'Orsay refused to comply since the Israeli diplomats had already left France. "For Eden, the existence of the Protocol was a catastrophe – a smoking gun that exposed the full extent of collusion between Britain, France and Israel." He was concerned that revelation of the agreement would be a threat to all three governments.

The original Israeli copy of the Protocol is said to be kept within the Ben-Gurion Archives, in Sde Boker.

A photocopy of the three pages of the Protocol in French was found in 2002 by the widow of Christian Pineau after his death, and images of the pages were published in 2010.

== In action ==
Four days after the Protocol, Israeli forces invaded Egypt. At the UN Security Council, the British and the French vetoed an American-sponsored resolution, which called for an end to the Israeli invasion. They then issued their own call for both Israel and Egypt to withdraw from within 16 km of the Suez Canal. When Egypt refused, the British and the French launched their own invasion to secure the canal zone under the guise of separating Egyptian and Israeli forces.

== Significance ==
In addition to the key role of this agreement in the overall Suez Crisis, the Protocol of Sèvres “marked the end of the estrangement between Britain and the Zionist movement that went back to the White Paper of 1939."

== See also ==
- Suez Crisis
