= Elsie Stephenson =

British nurse and relief worker

- Born: 22 January 1916; Bishop Auckland, England
- Died: 16 July 1967 (aged 51); Edinburgh, Scotland
- Other names: Elsie Gardner
- Occupations: nurse, academic
- Employer(s): British Red Cross, National Health Service, University of Edinburgh
- Known for: first Director of the Nursing Studies Unit, University of Edinburgh
- Spouse: William Gardner

Elsie Stephenson (22 January 1916 – 16 July 1967) was an English nurse and the first Director of the Nursing Studies Unit at the University of Edinburgh. The Unit was founded in 1956 and was the first university department of nursing in the UK.

== Early life ==
Stephenson was the only daughter, and the youngest of the four children, of Ethel (née Watson) and Henry Walker Stephenson, a farmer. She was born at Crawleas Farm, Merrington, in Bishop Auckland, County Durham. Her father's death in 1918 in the influenza pandemic has been cited as her motivation for becoming a nurse.

From 1926 to 1933, Stephenson attended Newmarket Grammar School. Stephenson failed her final school examinations and did not graduate from university.

On leaving school, Stephenson became a member of the Newmarket branch of the Red Cross. She began her General Nurse training at West Suffolk Hospital in Bury St Edmunds.

== Career ==
When she had completed her nursing training with the British Red Cross, Stephenson worked overseas with the Red Cross before and after World War II. This included working with Yugoslavian refugees in Egypt, in Italian refugee camps, in a mobile hospital for displaced Yugoslavian refugees in Germany and on an advisory board for child welfare in post-war Berlin.

From 1947 to 1948, Stephenson held a Florence Nightingale Scholarship for the study of public health administration at the University of Toronto.

Stephenson also worked in the American zone in Germany for the Red Cross and went on to work in Singapore, North Borneo, Brunei and Sarawak. The Glasgow Herald reported that, here, she was the first white woman to have been seen in one community and she delivered a baby to a 'headhunter' in another.

After leaving the Red Cross, she assumed the position of County Nursing Officer for East Suffolk in 1948; this was at the beginnings of the NHS. This was followed by a position in community nursing in Newcastle upon Tyne in 1950. Here, Stephenson participated in a research project which was published in 1956 as the Jameson Report, "An Enquiry into Health Visiting" - the report led to reform within health visiting. The Jameson Report had a particular focus on maternal mental health.

Her appointment as founding Director of the Nursing Studies Unit at the University of Edinburgh in June 1956 shocked members of the Scottish nursing community due to her lack of university education and teaching experience. Gladys Beaumont Carter who had an academic and nursing background had undertaken the research that led to the creation of the unit but she had become ill that year.

In her post as Director, Stephenson oversaw a new training scheme that expected students to graduate in an arts or humanities discipline before taking their nursing qualification. In 1964, a degree programme in Nursing was established, as well as a school for overseas students, which was supported by the World Health Organization.

Stephenson supervised nursing students including Annie Altschul (co-supervised with Henry Walton), whose MSc thesis was completed in 1967, and her influence was acknowledged by Audrey John.

== Family life ==
On 14 November 1964, Stephenson married William Henry Gardner, son of the printer, William John Gardner. Stephenson and Gardner met at the Stockholm Red Cross conference in August 1948.

== Death ==
Stephenson died of lung cancer on 16 July 1967, in City Hospital, Edinburgh. Her body was donated to medical research and her remains were buried at Walthamstow.

== Legacy ==
Stephenson has been described as having 'established nursing as a serious academic subject in one of our oldest and most distinguished universities'.

Within days of Stephenson's death in 1967, the University of Edinburgh set up the Special (Elsie Stephenson) Nursing Studies Fund, with the aim of developing the work of the Department of Nursing Studies at the university. The University of Edinburgh hosts an annual Elsie Stephenson Memorial Lecture, which celebrates the work of Stephenson.

Eight years after Stephenson's death a launch called 'The Elsie Stephenson' was blessed in Kuching.
