= January 1956 =

Month of 1956

<<	January 1956					>>
Su	Mo	Tu	We	Th	Fr	Sa
1	2	3	4	5	6	7
8	9	10	11	12	13	14
15	16	17	18	19	20	21
22	23	24	25	26	27	28
29	30	31

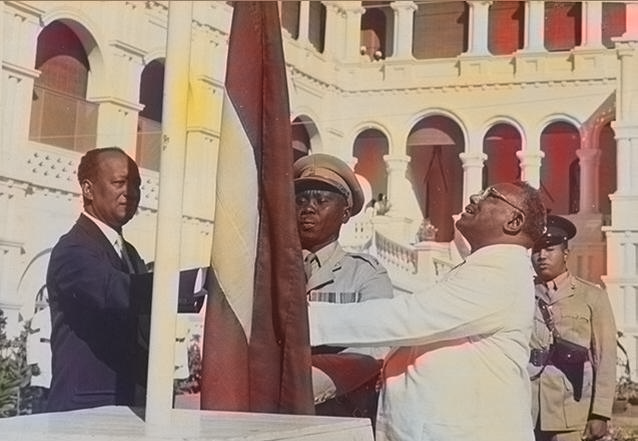
January 1, 1956: Sudan gains independence from the United Kingdom as Prime Minister Ismail al-Aazhari and opposition leader Mohamed Ahmed al-Mahjoub raise the flag.

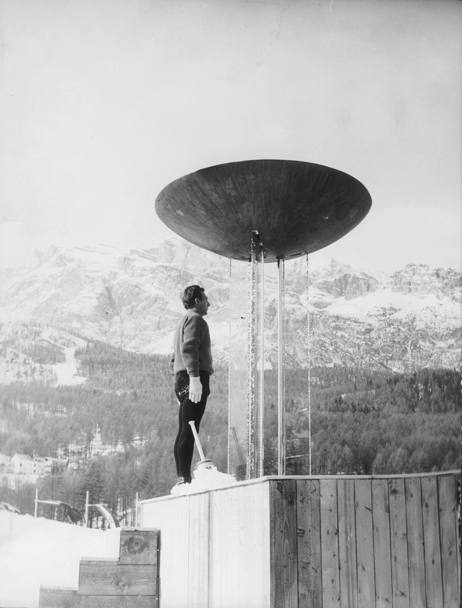
The 1956 Winter Olympics open in Italy as Guido Caroli lights the Olympic flame.

Flag of the Republic of Sudan

The following events occurred in January 1956:

== January 1, 1956 (Sunday) ==
- The Anglo-Egyptian Condominium ended, with the Republic of Sudan becoming an independent nation after nearly 136 years of union with Egypt and 56 years of British occupation.
- Carl Perkins's record "Blue Suede Shoes" was released in the United States and would rise to the top of the charts within weeks.
- A stampede during a New Year's event at the Yahiko Shrine in Niigata Prefecture, Japan, resulted in 124 deaths and 77 people injured.
- Possession of heroin became a criminal offence in the United Kingdom.
- Born:
  - Christine Lagarde, French lawyer, politician and managing director of the International Monetary Fund; in Paris
  - Kōji Yakusho, Japanese actor; in Nagasaki

== January 2, 1956 (Monday) ==
- The French legislative election, brought forward from June by Edgar Faure using a constitutional sanction, resulted in a coalition government led by Guy Mollet.
- The British collier ship Citrine sank off The Lizard, Cornwall. One crew member died; the rest were rescued by lifeboat.
- Liberian-registered tanker SS Melody ran aground at Vlissingen in the Netherlands.
- In the United States, the 1956 Rose Bowl college football game was won by the Michigan State Spartans, who defeated the UCLA Bruins by 17–14, with Walt Kowalczyk being given the award for best player.
- Bill Hartack, future Hall of Fame jockey who won 417 races in 1955, started 1956 by riding four winners at Tropical Park.

== January 3, 1956 (Tuesday) ==
- Fire broke out in the television transmitter at the top of the Eiffel Tower, causing damage that would take a year to repair.
- By popular demand, Peter Pan, starring Mary Martin, was restaged live by Producers' Showcase on NBC-TV.
- Born: Mel Gibson, American actor; in Peekskill, New York
- Died: Joseph Wirth, 76, German politician, Chancellor of Germany 1921–1922

== January 5, 1956 (Thursday) ==
- Warren John Nutter, an 18-year-old parolee from Freeport, Illinois, shoots and kills Police Officer Harold Pearce during an escape attempt at the police station in Independence, Iowa. Following a manhunt and his eventual conviction, Nutter would go on to become the longest-serving inmate in Iowa state history, serving more than 65 years in the Iowa State Penitentiary until his death in 2021.
- A Piasecki YH-16A Turbo Transporter helicopter prototype, 50-1270, broke up and crashed near Swedesboro, New Jersey, near the Delaware River, United States, during a test flight. The cause of the crash was later determined to be the aft slip ring, which led to a failure of the rotor shaft. The two test pilots, Harold Peterson and George Callaghan, were killed, and the YH-16 was later cancelled.
- The Dutch coaster SS Hartel collided with French ship SS Penhir in the River Thames at Gravesend, Kent, England. All nine people on board were rescued.
- The British cargo ship SS Gem collided with Norwegian ship SS Kallgeir at Poortershaven in the Netherlands and was beached.

== January 6, 1956 (Friday) ==
- Ismail al-Azhari took office as the first Prime Minister of an independent Sudan.
- British tanker SS Esso Appalachee caused significant damage when it hit a jetty at Immingham, Lincolnshire, UK.
- In the UK, Independent Television's weekly current affairs programme This Week, made by Associated-Rediffusion (later Thames Television), began its 23-year run.

== January 7, 1956 (Saturday) ==
- The 1956 New Zealand Grand Prix motor race was held at the Ardmore Circuit and was won by Stirling Moss.
- Panama-registered cargo ship SS Alvi struck a mine and sank in the North Sea, west of Hvide Sande, Denmark.
- Born: David Caruso, American actor (NYPD Blue, CSI: Miami), in New York City

== January 8, 1956 (Sunday) ==
- Operation Auca: Five evangelical Christian missionaries from the United States (Nate Saint, Roger Youderian, Ed McCully, Jim Elliot and Pete Fleming) were speared to death by members of the Huaorani people of Ecuador after attempting to introduce Christianity to them.
- An earthquake of magnitude 6.6 struck the Arica and Parinacota Region of Chile, resulting in at least one death.
- In the United States, Jim Tatum resigned as coach of the Maryland Terrapins football team for a job with the North Carolina Tar Heels.

== January 9, 1956 (Monday) ==
- The 1956 World Professional Match-play Championship opened in Belfast, Northern Ireland, with a match between John Pulman and Jackie Rea.

== January 10, 1956 (Tuesday) ==
- Norwegian coaster Sirabuen collided with Brazilian ship Loide Venezuela and sank near Kijkduin, Netherlands; only one of her eight crew survived.
- At Edwards Air Force Base, California, U.S. Air Force 1st Lt. Barty R. Brooks died in the crash of a North American F-100 Super Sabre. The accident was caught on film and became one of the most notorious instances of the aerodynamic phenomenon known as the "Sabre dance".
- Born: Shawn Colvin, American singer and songwriter; in Vermillion, South Dakota

== January 11, 1956 (Wednesday) ==
- President Ngô Đình Diệm of South Vietnam issued Ordinance Number 6, giving his government "almost unchecked power to deal with the opposition".
- The Soviet Union approved technical specifications for the R-13 submarine-launched ballistic missile.
- The Chicago, Indianapolis and Louisville Railway is officially renamed the Monon Railroad, formerly its nickname.

== January 12, 1956 (Thursday) ==
- An earthquake of magnitude 5.8 struck Budapest, Hungary, resulting in two deaths and major damage.

== January 13, 1956 (Friday) ==
- A six-day ice storm that had "lashed" Mount Washington in the United States since January 8 came to an end.

== January 14, 1956 (Saturday) ==
- Wetzcon 1956, the first science fiction convention ever held in Germany, opened in Wetzlar.

== January 15, 1956 (Sunday) ==
- Born: Mayawati, Indian politician; in New Delhi

== January 16, 1956 (Monday) ==
- Egyptian leader Gamal Abdel Nasser vowed to reconquer Palestine.

== January 17, 1956 (Tuesday) ==
- U.S. T2 tanker Salem Maritime exploded, caught fire and sank in Lake Charles, Louisiana. The ship was later refloated but declared a constructive total loss.

== January 18, 1956 (Wednesday) ==
- The final rounds of the United States National Football League draft were held at the Ambassador Hotel in Los Angeles, California.
- Died: Konstantin Päts, 81, Estonian politician, President of Estonia 1938–1940

== January 19, 1956 (Thursday) ==
- Born: Carman, American Christian singer; in Trenton, New Jersey (d. 2021)

== January 20, 1956 (Friday) ==
- West Germany's Chancellor Konrad Adenauer addressed the first volunteers of the recently formed army of the Federal Republic.
- A Gloster Meteor NF 12 WS661 of Britain's Royal Air Force hit a tree and crashed into buildings at Wadhurst, East Sussex, killing both crew members and two bystanders.

== January 21, 1956 (Saturday) ==
- Italian cargo ship Maria Pompei ran aground at Aberavon beach in Wales.
- Born: Geena Davis, American actress; in Wareham, Massachusetts

== January 22, 1956 (Sunday) ==
- Redondo Junction train wreck: The Atchison, Topeka, and Santa Fe Railway's San Diegan passenger train derailed just outside Los Angeles Union Passenger Terminal, resulting in 30 deaths, making it the worst rail accident in the city's history.
- The 1956 Formula One season opened with the Argentine Grand Prix. The race was won by Juan Manuel Fangio, who co-drove with Luigi Musso and would go on to take the Drivers' Championship.

== January 23, 1956 (Monday) ==
- British cargo ship SS Baltrover ran aground at the mouth of the Elbe river in West Germany.
- Died: Sir Alexander Korda, 62, Hungarian-born British film producer and director, died of a heart attack.

== January 25, 1956 (Wednesday) ==
- Born: Bill Turnbull, British presenter and journalist; in Guildford, England (d. 2022)
- Died: Lyons Kelliher, 52, Chicago Police Department detective and former National Football League guard who played one game with the Chicago Cardinals in 1928, was shot and killed on duty by a 17-year-old AWOL soldier.

== January 26, 1956 (Thursday) ==
- Finnish troops reoccupied Porkkala after Soviet troops vacated its military base. Civilians could return on February 4.
- The 1956 Winter Olympics opened in Cortina d'Ampezzo, Italy. While speed skater Guido Caroli was entering the Stadio Olimpico Del Ghiaccio, carrying the Olympic flame, in the presence of Italy's president, Giovanni Gronchi, he tripped on a television cable, but regained his feet to light the cauldron successfully.

== January 27, 1956 (Friday) ==
- Gustavo Rojas Pinilla, Supreme General in Chief of Colombia, issued "Decree 133 of 1956", transforming the General Secretariat into the Administrative Department of the Presidency of the Republic.
- Died: Erich Kleiber, 65, Austrian conductor and composer, died of a heart attack.

== January 28, 1956 (Saturday) ==
- Elvis Presley made his first appearance on U.S. national television on The Dorsey Brothers Stage Show.
- American test pilot and future astronaut Neil Armstrong married Janet Elizabeth Shearon at the Congregational Church in Wilmette, Illinois. They would spend their honeymoon in Acapulco.

== January 29, 1956 (Sunday) ==
- West German cargo ship MV Gertrud sank in the North Sea 150 nautical miles (280 km) east of Peterhead, Aberdeenshire, Scotland. All nine crew were rescued by the local trawlers Junella and York City.
- The 1956 World Sportscar Championship season opened with the 1000km of Buenos Aires, which was won by Stirling Moss and Carlos Menditeguy.
- Olga Fernánda Fiallo Oliva de los Rosario won the Miss Dominican Republic 1956 title.
- Born: Jan Jakub Kolski, Polish cinematographer; in Wrocław
- Died: H. L. Mencken, 75, American journalist, satirist and scholar

== January 30, 1956 (Monday) ==
- The 1956 Australian Championships tennis tournament concluded in Brisbane, with Lew Hoad as the Men's Singles champion and Mary Carter as the Women's Singles champion.

== January 31, 1956 (Tuesday) ==
- A U.S. Air Force North American TB-25N Mitchell, 44-29125, on a cross-country flight from Nellis AFB, Nevada, to Olmsted AFB, Pennsylvania, was diverted to Greater Pittsburgh AFB but ditched in the Monongahela River. Four of the six crew evacuated successfully but two drowned. The aircraft wreckage was never recovered.
- Born: John Lydon ("Johnny Rotten"), English singer; in London
- Died: A. A. Milne, 74, English children's writer and dramatist
