= Yahiko =

Yahiko (弥彦) is a Japanese name, and may refer to:

== Real people ==
- Yahiko Mishima (三島 弥彦, 1886 – 1954), a Japanese track and field athlete.

== Fictional characters ==
- Myōjin Yahiko (明神 弥彦), a character in the Rurouni Kenshin series.
- Yahiko (弥彦), a character in the Naruto series.

== Places ==
- Yahiko, Niigata, a village in Japan
- Yahiko Station, a train station in Yahiko, Niigata
- Yahiko Line, a Japanese rail line
- Yahiko Velodrome, a velodrome in Yahiko, Niigata
