= 1956 Yahiko Shrine stampede =

1956 human stampede in Japan

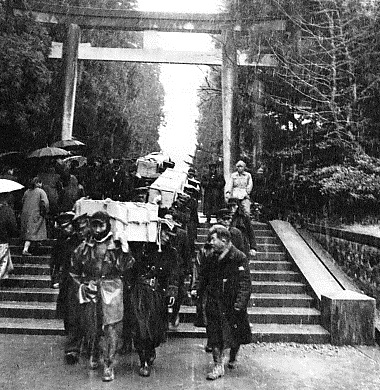
- The coffin of a victim being carried out from Yahiko Shrine
- Date: 1 January 1956
- Location: Yahiko Shrine, Yahiko, Japan; 37°42′23″N 138°49′36″E
- Participants: 35000–40000
- Deaths: 124
- Injuries: 75
- Property damage: collapsed shrine stone walls

Just after midnight in the morning of 1 January 1956 a human crowd crush and stampede at the Yahiko Shrine in Yahiko, Japan, resulted in the death of 124 individuals and 75 others were injured.

== Stampede ==
Around midnight of 1 January 1956, 35,000 to 40,000 people visited the Yahiko Shrine to pay the traditional honors on the occasion of the new year. Just after midnight a stampede occurred on the steep steps leading to the shrine at the moment the priest started throwing down rice cookies, according to the tradition. The two-metres high stone walls on the sides of the stair collapsed due to the pushing by crowd. People were buried under the stones or fell down.

Initial reports listed 112 deaths and 50 injured people. These numbers later increased to 124 deaths and 75 injured people.
