= Osdorf =

Osdorf may refer to places in Germany:

- Osdorf, Schleswig-Holstein, a municipality in the district of Rendsburg-Eckernförde
- Osdorf, Hamburg, a quarter of the Free and Hanseatic city of Hamburg
- Osdorfer Straße, a railway station in Berlin

See also

FV Osdorf, a pre- and post-war fishing trawler, which served during the war as the vorpostenboot V 311 Osdorf
