= Yahikoyama Ropeway =

Aerial lift in Japan

Coordinates: 37°42′33.4″N 138°48′59.5″E

Sanroku Station, September 2026

Yahikoyama Ropeway

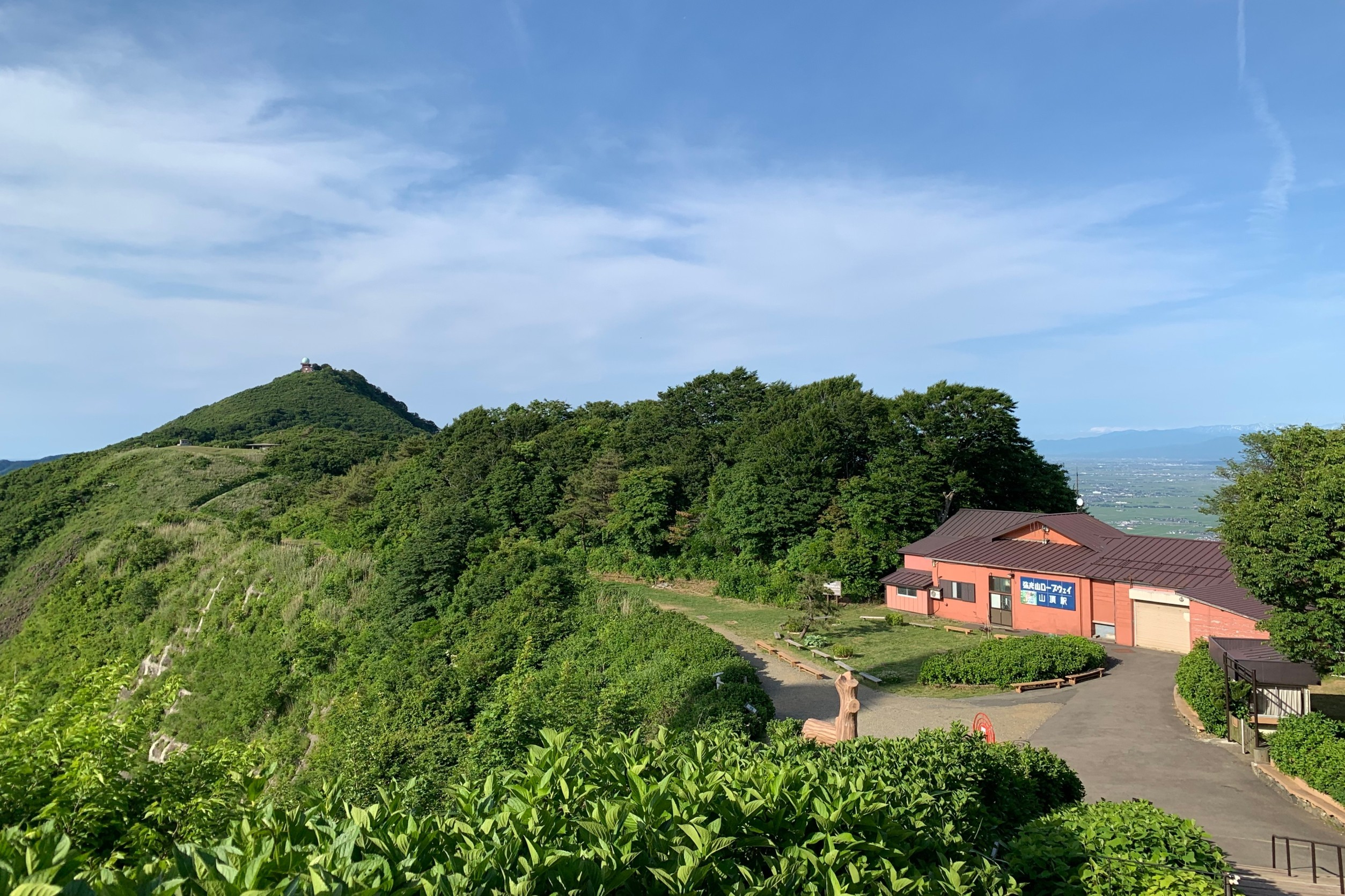
Sancho Station, June 2020

The Yahikoyama Ropeway (弥彦山ロープウェイ, Yahikoyama Rōpuwei) is a Japanese aerial lift line in Yahiko, Niigata. This is the only line Yahiko Kankō Ropeway (弥彦観光索道, Yahiko Kankō Sakudō; "Yahiko Sightseeing Ropeway") operates. The company is a subsidiary of Juraku, which operates hotels and restaurants. Opened in 1958, the line climbs Mount Yahiko (弥彦山) of Yahiko Shrine (弥彦神社). There is Panorama Tower at the summit, a tower with the observatory that moves like a rotating elevator. The observatory has a view of Sado Island on a clear day.

== Basic data ==
- System: Aerial tramway, 3 cables
- Cable length: 981 m (3,219 ft)
- Vertical interval: 419 m (1,375 ft)
- Operational speed: 3.7 m/s
- Passenger capacity per a cabin: 35
- Cabins: 2
- Stations: 2
- Duration of one-way trip: 5 minutes

== See also ==
- List of aerial lifts in Japan
