= December 1955 =

Month of 1955

<<	December 1955					>>
Su	Mo	Tu	We	Th	Fr	Sa
				1	2	3
4	5	6	7	8	9	10
11	12	13	14	15	16	17
18	19	20	21	22	23	24
25	26	27	28	29	30	31

The following events occurred in December 1955:

== December 1, 1955 (Thursday) ==
- In Montgomery, Alabama, USA, Rosa Parks refuses to obey bus driver James F. Blake's order that she give up her seat to make room for a white passenger and is arrested, leading to the Montgomery bus boycott.

== December 2, 1955 (Friday) ==
- Edgar Faure dissolves France's National Assembly under Article 51 of the country's Constitution.
- Barnes rail crash: After a collision at Barnes, London, UK, caused by a signal error, fire breaks out. Thirteen people are killed and 35 injured.

== December 3, 1955 (Saturday) ==
- Resistance fighter Osvald Harjo returns to Norway after 13 years in Soviet prison camps.
- KTVE TV channel 10 in Monroe-El Dorado, LA (NBC) begins broadcasting.

== December 4, 1955 (Sunday) ==
- The International Federation of Blood Donor Organizations is founded in Luxembourg.

== December 5, 1955 (Monday) ==
- The American Federation of Labor and the Congress of Industrial Organizations merge to become the AFL–CIO.
- The Montgomery Improvement Association is formed in Montgomery, Alabama, by Rev. Martin Luther King Jr., and other Black ministers to coordinate a Black people's boycott of all city buses.
- Died: Glenn L. Martin, 69, US aviation pioneer

== December 6, 1955 (Tuesday) ==
- Austria's neutrality is recognised by the USA, Soviet Union, UK and France.
- The Bensen B-8M autogyro makes its maiden flight.
- NY psychologist Joyce Brothers won "The $64,000 Question" on boxing
- Died: Honus Wagner, 81, American baseball player

== December 7, 1955 (Wednesday) ==
- A U.S. Navy Martin P6M SeaMaster airplane explodes over Naval Air Station Patuxent River with the loss of all four crew members.
- The role of Deputy Premier of Western Australia is formally established by the Government of Western Australia.
- Clement Attlee resigns as leader of the UK Labour Party after twenty years.

== December 8, 1955 (Thursday) ==
- France's Republican Front coalition is formed by Guy Mollet, Pierre Mendès France, François Mitterrand and Jacques Chaban-Delmas.
- The Council of Europe adopts a new flag.
- British conductor Sir Thomas Beecham is presented with the Order of the White Rose of Finland.

== December 9, 1955 (Friday) ==
- Adnan Menderes of the Democrat Party forms the new government of Turkey (22nd government).
- The UK cargo ship Darton runs aground off Gedser, Denmark, but is refloated.

== December 10, 1955 (Saturday) ==
- In the Australian federal election, the incumbent Liberal Party, led by Prime Minister Robert Menzies with coalition partner the Country Party, led by Arthur Fadden, defeats the Labor Party, led by H. V. Evatt. Future PM Malcolm Fraser enters Parliament for the first time as Liberal member for Wannon.
- The first Saturday morning cartoon series is shown on U.S. television: The Mighty Mouse Playhouse is broadcast by CBS.

== December 11, 1955 (Sunday) ==
- Operation Olive Leaves, an Israeli reprisal operation against Syria, ends with the destruction of Syrian emplacements, and fifty-four Syrians killed in action, with another thirty taken prisoner. Six IDF fatalities are reported.
- Italy's Radical Party is founded by a splinter group of the Italian Liberal Party.

== December 12, 1955 (Monday) ==
- The hundred-year-old Cork Opera House at Emmet Place is destroyed by fire.
- Christopher Cockerell patents his design of the hovercraft.

== December 13, 1955 (Tuesday) ==
- The de Havilland Comet 3, the world's first jet airliner, visits an American airport for the first time when it stops at Honolulu International Airport in Honolulu, Hawaii, during an around-the-world flight. It then flies to Vancouver, British Columbia, Canada, in 5 hours 39 minutes.
- Club Sporting Cristal is founded in Peru; it will become one of South America's most successful football teams.
- Born: Manohar Parrikar (d. 2019), Indian politician and Chief Minister of Goa, in Mapusa.

== December 14, 1955 (Wednesday) ==
- An annular solar eclipse took place.
- The Tappan Zee Bridge over the Hudson River in New York State opens to traffic.
- Albania, Austria, Bulgaria, Cambodia, Finland, Hungary, Ireland, Italy, Jordan, Laos, Libya, Nepal, Portugal, Romania, Spain, and Sri Lanka join the United Nations simultaneously, after several years of a moratorium on admitting new members that began during the Korean War.
- UK cargo ship Victoria City collides with Italian ship SS Valentina Bibolini off Ameland, Netherlands, and sinks.
- Hugh Gaitskell becomes leader of the UK Labour Party, having been Chancellor of the Exchequer during the final year of the previous Labour government.
- Born: Hervé Guibert, French writer and photographer, in Saint-Cloud (died 1991)

== December 15, 1955 (Thursday) ==
- The de Havilland Mosquito flies its final operational sortie with the Royal Air Force.

== December 16, 1955 (Friday) ==
- The title of Earl Attlee in the British peerage is created for ex-Prime Minister Clement Attlee.
- Queen Elizabeth II of the United Kingdom opens a new terminal at London Airport.

== December 17, 1955 (Saturday) ==
- The African National Congress' 44th Annual Conference opens in Bloemfontein, South Africa.

== December 18, 1955 (Sunday) ==
- In the Guatemalan parliamentary election, the National Democratic Movement wins 58 of the 66 seats in Congress.
- In the Saarland, the Deutsche Heimatbund (German Patriotic Front, including the three parties favorable to the reunification with West Germany) wins the election, with 65% of votes.
- In North Korea, Pak Hon Yong, former minister of Foreign affairs, is sentenced to death, under the false charge of espionage.
- Born: Vijay Mallia (Bantwal), controversial Indian businessman and politician

== December 19, 1955 (Monday) ==
- Under the leadership of Ismail al-Azhari, Sudan adopts a declaration of independence from Egypt, to take effect on 1 January 1956 with the agreement of Egypt and the UK.
- The Representative of Portugal to the United Nations makes a Declaration of Acceptance, on behalf of the Government of Portugal, of the jurisdiction of the International Court of Justice in a dispute with India, resulting in further legal controversy.
- In Jordan, King Hussein declares the state of siege, after the riots and the attacks to the foreign embassies because the announced adherence of the country to the Baghdad Pact. The Hazza' al-Majali government, in charge for less than a week, resigns.
- Dame Edna Everage makes her first stage appearance, in Melbourne, Australia.

== December 20, 1955 (Tuesday) ==
- Cardiff is declared the capital of Wales by the British Government.
- In the Jordan sector of Jerusalem, the crowd assaults the embassies of USA and France; the American diplomatic staff takes refuge in the Israeli sector.
- Reshuffle in the Eden cabinet: Selwyn Lloyd goes to the Foreign Office in the place of Harold Macmillan, who becomes Chancellor of the Exchequer.
- Born: Martin Schulz (Herlath), German politician.

== December 21, 1955 (Wednesday) ==
- Ibrahim Hashem becomes acting Prime Minister of Jordan, thus beginning his third term in the post.
- Khrushchev and Bulganin come back in Moscow, warmly welcomed by the crowd, after an official trip in Burma, India and Afghanistan lasting over a month.
- In France, the Prime Minister Edgar Faure convenes an extraordinary cabinet meeting because the troubles in Algeria, where the guerrilla has caused an hundred victims only in the last 24 hours.

== December 22, 1955 (Thursday) ==
- Javanese-born US cytogeneticist Joe Hin Tjio discovers the correct number of human chromosomes, forty-six.
- In Paraguay, the president Alfredo Stroessner quells an attempted coup d’état by the followers of Epifanio Mendez Fleitas, director of the Central Bank.

== December 23, 1955 (Friday) ==
- The countess Pia Bellentani is released from the Pozzuoli penal psychiatric hospital. The woman, sentenced to ten years in 1952 for the killing of her lover Carlo Sacchi, had been pardoned by the Italian president Gronchi.
- In Chateau-Chinon, a Francois Mitterrand’s election rally is interrupted by the raid of 500 UDCA militants, headed by Pierre Poujade himself. In the following harsh debate between the two politicians, however, the young socialist clearly outclasses his adversary.
- Otto John, former head of the German secret service (BfV) is arrested in Wiesbaden. After a clamorous defection to East the last year, he had returned in West Germany the 12th of December.
- In Paris, Marina Vlady marries Robert Hossein.
- Born:
  - Carol Ann Duffy, Scottish poet, in Glasgow
  - Şivan Perwer, Turkish-Kurdish poet and singer, in Viransehir (official birth date)

== December 24, 1955 (Saturday) ==
- The Fifth Amendment of the Constitution of India receives assent from President Rajendra Prasad.
- In his Christmas radio message, aired by Vatican radio, Pope Pius XII asks for the abolition of nuclear weapons. The speech is relayed also by Radio Moscow (except for the part where the pope confirms the condemnation of communism).
- A flood devastates North California, Nevada and Oregon, making 22 victims; also the Reno town hall is awash.
- Daniel Havas, a forty-year-old confectioner with mental troubles, puts a home-made time bomb in the Sacré-Cœur of Montmartre to protest against the atomic threat (another device was destined for Notre Dame). The bomb, unexploded, is discovered on Christmas Day, following reports by Havas himself.
- Born: David Rothkopf, political scientist, in Urbana, Illinois.

== December 25, 1955 (Sunday) ==
- After being on radio since 1932, the Royal Christmas Message is broadcast on British television for the first time, in sound only, at 3.00pm.
- Encyclical Musicae sacrae by Pope Pius XII on sacred music.

== December 26, 1955 (Monday) ==
- The eleventh Sydney to Hobart Yacht Race starts at noon in Sydney Harbour, with a fleet of 17 competitors.
- In Milan, the theatre Piccola Scala (on the back of La Scala) is inaugurated with Domenico Cimarosa’s Il matrimonio segreto (direction by Giorgio Strehler).

== December 27, 1955 (Tuesday) ==
- Japanese cargo ship SS Tanda Maru is driven ashore in a typhoon on Honshu and breaks in two. Fourteen of her 24 crew are rescued by a US helicopter.
- Dead: Ely Culbertson, 64, American bridge player.

== December 28, 1955 (Wednesday) ==
- Meeting in Cairo between Tito and Nasser.
- 44th Davis Cup: Australia beats USA in New York (5-0).
- Born: Liu Xiaobo (刘晓波), Chinese critic, writer and activist, in Changchun (d. 2017)

== December 29, 1955 (Thursday) ==
- Turkey's Liberty Party is formed by a group of disaffected MPs.
- Bulganin and Khrushchev relate to the Supreme Soviet about their diplomatic tour in Asia. On this occasion, Bulganin reveals that Soviet Union owns intercontinental ballistic missiles.
- L’Express publishes some frames, shot by the cameraman Georges Chassagne for Fox-Movietone, showing the summary execution of an Algerian rebel by a gendarme, after the battle of Philippeville. The French government first charges Chassagne to have staged the scene and even to have paid the gendarme for carrying out the killing, then has to admit the truth of the images.

== December 30, 1955 (Friday) ==
- Died: Neal Macrossan, 66, Australian lawyer, Chief Justice of the Supreme Court of Queensland.

== December 31, 1955 (Saturday) ==
- General Motors becomes the first American corporation to make a profit of over one billion dollars in one year.
- Harrison Dillard, a two-time Olympic Champion was named the James E. Sullivan Memorial Trophy winner as the United States' Amateur Athlete of 1955.
- Born: Erminia Giuliano, in Naples, female boss of the Giuliano clan.
