= November 1955 =

Month of 1955

<<	November 1955					>>
Su	Mo	Tu	We	Th	Fr	Sa
		1	2	3	4	5
6	7	8	9	10	11	12
13	14	15	16	17	18	19
20	21	22	23	24	25	26
27	28	29	30

The following events occurred in November 1955:

== November 1, 1955 (Tuesday) ==
- "Official" date of the beginning of the Vietnam War between the South Vietnam Army and the North Vietnam Army in which the latter is allied with the Viet Cong.
- A Douglas DC-6B Mainliner Denver, operating as United Airlines Flight 629, is destroyed over Longmont, Colorado, by a time bomb planted in the cargo hold by Jack Gilbert Graham, who is attempting to cash in his mother's life insurance policies. All 44 on board, his mother among them, are killed. Graham would be executed for the crime on January 11, 1957.
- Ishizuchi Quasi-National Park is founded in Ehime Prefecture and Kōchi Prefecture, Japan.

== November 2, 1955 (Wednesday) ==
- The first Suribachi-class ammunition ship is launched at Sparrows Point, Maryland, USA.

== November 3, 1955 (Thursday) ==
- New Zealand Government Railways replaces Rimutaka Incline by opening of the Rimutaka Tunnel on the Wairarapa Line, at 8.79 km (5.46 mi) the longest in the Southern Hemisphere at this time. The line becomes the first in New Zealand to be wholly dieselised.
- Café Filho is forced to give up the presidency of Brazil on health grounds. President-elect Juscelino Kubitschek does not take office until the following year.

== November 4, 1955 (Friday) ==
- Born: Matti Vanhanen, Prime Minister of Finland, in Jyväskylä, Finland
- Died: Cy Young, 88, American baseball player

== November 5, 1955 (Saturday) ==
- Racial segregation is outlawed on trains and buses in interstate commerce in the United States.
- Died: Maurice Utrillo, 71, French painter

== November 6, 1955 (Sunday) ==
- The 1955 Ryder Cup golf competition, held at Thunderbird Country Club in Rancho Mirage, California, United States, ends in a seventh consecutive win for the home team.
- Born: Maria Shriver, US TV journalist, in Chicago, to Eunice Kennedy Shriver and Sargent Shriver.

== November 7, 1955 (Monday) ==
- In the Australian government, Sir Josiah Francis is replaced as Minister for the Army and Navy by Sir Eric Harrison.

== November 8, 1955 (Tuesday) ==
- In the Philippine Senate election, supporters of President Ramon Magsaysay's Nacionalista Party top the poll.
- Died: Musa Ghiatuddin Riayat Shah of Selangor, 61, former Sultan of Selangor, Malaysia

== November 9, 1955 (Wednesday) ==
- André Louis Dubois becomes the French resident-general in Morocco.
- The US fishing vessel Last Chance is destroyed by fire in Anderson Bay, Alaska, United States.

== November 10, 1955 (Thursday) ==
- The UK merchant vessel Joyvita is found adrift in the Pacific Ocean, with no one on board, seven days after leaving Suva, Fiji, on its way to Funafuti in the Ellice islands.
- The US 7-ton fishing vessel Alice G II sinks in Young Bay, Admiralty Island, in the Alexander Archipelago, Southeast Alaska.
- Ownership of the UK minesweeper HMS Pineham is transferred to France.

== November 11, 1955 (Friday) ==
- Born:
  - Dave Alvin, American musician (The Blasters), in Los Angeles County, California)
  - Friedrich Merz, German politician, Chancellor of Germany (2025-present), in Brilon, West Germany
  - Jigme Singye Wangchuck, King of Bhutan, at Dechenchholing Palace, Thimphu, the son of Jigme Dorji Wangchuck and Ashi Kesang Choden Wangchuck

== November 12, 1955 (Saturday) ==
- The New Zealand national rugby league team, in the course of its tour of Great Britain and France, loses 12–27 to a Great Britain team at Odsal Stadium, Bradford.

== November 13, 1955 (Sunday) ==
- Constitutional Assembly elections are held in the Dominican Republic.
- Born: Whoopi Goldberg, US actress and comedian, in Manhattan, New York, as Caryn Elaine Johnson

== November 14, 1955 (Monday) ==
- Died: Ruby M. Ayres, 74, English romantic novelist

== November 15, 1955 (Tuesday) ==
- The Leningrad Metro (now the Saint Petersburg Metro) opens in Russia. The new stations include Avtovo, designed by Ye.A. Levinson.
- The Irish coaster City of Ghent sinks 3 kilometres (1.9 mi) off the Lizard Lighthouse, Cornwall, UK. All seventeen crew members are rescued by the Cadgwith lifeboat.

== November 16, 1955 (Wednesday) ==
- 1955 South West African parliamentary election: A whites-only election ends in victory for the National Party of South-West Africa.

== November 17, 1955 (Thursday) ==
- The parish of Nuestra Señora del Perpetuo Socorro y San Alfonso, Montevideo, Uruguay, is established.
- Born: Yolanda King, African-American activist and oldest child of Martin Luther King Jr., in Montgomery, Alabama (d. 2007)

== November 18, 1955 (Friday) ==
- Empresas Públicas de Medellín is established as a residential public utilities company serving the inhabitants of Medellin, Colombia.

== November 19, 1955 (Saturday) ==
- C. Northcote Parkinson first propounds 'Parkinson's law', in The Economist.
- The first round proper of the 1955–56 FA Cup competition in the UK is played; replays take place on Monday, 28 November.
- In the final of the 1954–55 Israel State Cup football competition, Maccabi Tel Aviv F.C. defeat Hapoel Nes Tziona to win their 8th title.
- Born: Clara Bohitile, Namibian politician, in Windhoek

== November 20, 1955 (Sunday) ==
- Milton rail crash: a passenger train, carrying 293 passengers from south Wales to Paddington, takes a crossover faster than the recommended limit. The automatic train control system fails to stop the train, which is derailed at Milton, near Didcot, UK. Eleven people are killed and 157 injured.
- Bo Diddley makes his television debut on Ed Sullivan's Toast Of The Town show for the CBS-TV network.

== November 21, 1955 (Monday) ==
- The British Olympic Association holds its Annual Dinner, chaired by the 10th Duke of Beaufort, at Grosvenor House in London.

== November 22, 1955 (Tuesday) ==
- A Soviet Tupolev Tu-16 (NATO reporting name "Badger") drops the first Soviet thermo-nuclear bomb, RDS-37, in Siberia.
- "Colonel" Tom Parker signs US singer Elvis Presley to RCA Records.
- Ichirō Hatoyama begins his third term as Prime Minister of Japan.
- Died: Shemp Howard, 60, The Three Stooges member (heart attack)

== November 23, 1955 (Wednesday) ==
- The Cocos Islands in the Indian Ocean are transferred from British to Australian control.
- The Thai cargo ship Nang Suang Nawa and the Philippines-registered tug Albacore are lost at sea between Thailand and Hong Kong.
- Born: Ludovico Einaudi, Italian pianist and composer, in Turin

== November 24, 1955 (Thursday) ==
- The first match of the New Zealand cricket tour of India ends in a draw at the Lal Bahadur Shastri Stadium, Hyderabad.
- Born: Sir Ian Botham, English cricketer, in Heswall, Cheshire

== November 25, 1955 (Friday) ==
- Born: Bruno Tonioli, Italian dancer and choreographer, in Ferrara

== November 26, 1955 (Saturday) ==
- Sir John Harding, the British Governor of Cyprus, declares a state of emergency on the island as a result of the EOKA campaign.

== November 27, 1955 (Sunday) ==
- The Liberian-registered cargo ship Kismet runs aground at Cape St. Lawrence, Nova Scotia, Canada, and is wrecked. The 22 crew members are rescued by a Royal Canadian Navy helicopter.
- Born:
  - Andreas, Prince of Leiningen, German prince, son of Prince Emich Kyrill, in Frankfurt
  - Bill Nye, American television show host, in Washington, D.C.
- Died: Arthur Honegger, 63, French-born Swiss composer (heart attack)

== November 28, 1955 (Monday) ==
- Ray Lawler's Summer of the Seventeenth Doll receives its stage première by the Union Theatre Repertory Company in Melbourne with the playwright in a leading rôle; this is influential as the first authentically naturalistic modern drama in the theatre of Australia.
- The US NCAA Men's Cross Country Championships are held in East Lansing, Michigan, and are won by the hosts, Michigan State Spartans cross country team.
- Born: Alessandro Altobelli, Italian Serie A football player (Inter Milan, Brescia Calcio, Latina Calcio 1932 and Juventus FC), in Sonnino, Province of Latina.

== November 29, 1955 (Tuesday) ==
- A partial meltdown of the nuclear reactor core of Experimental Breeder Reactor I near Arco, Idaho, United States, takes place during a coolant flow test.
- A partial lunar eclipse takes place.
- The UK première of Carlos Chávez's Symphony No. 3 takes place at the Maida Vale Studios, with Juan José Castro conducting the London Symphony Orchestra.
- Born: Howie Mandel, Canadian comedian, actor and host, in Toronto

== November 30, 1955 (Wednesday) ==
- The 1st Soviet Antarctic Expedition, led by Mikhail Somov, begins; it would last two years.
- Born: Billy Idol, English musician, in Stanmore
