= September 1955 =

Month of 1955

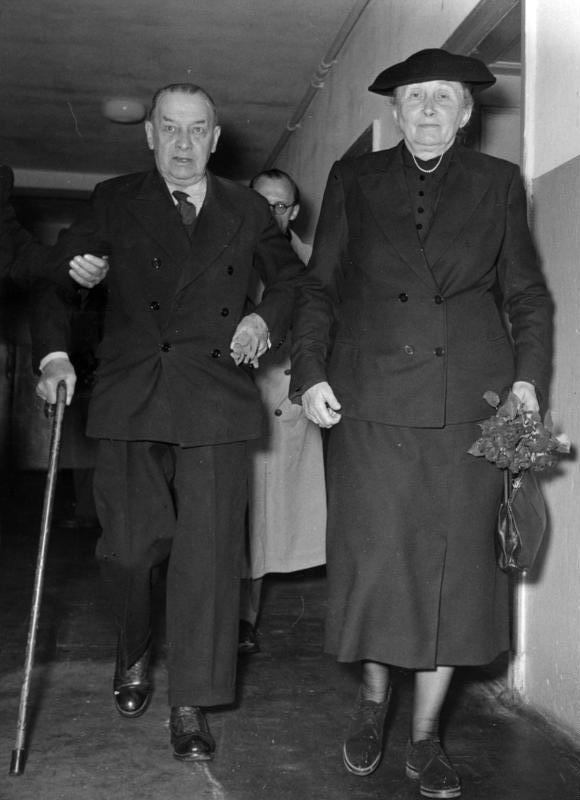
September 26, 1955: Former Grand Admiral Erich Raeder is released from Spandau Prison

<<	September 1955					>>
Su	Mo	Tu	We	Th	Fr	Sa
				1	2	3
4	5	6	7	8	9	10
11	12	13	14	15	16	17
18	19	20	21	22	23	24
25	26	27	28	29	30

The following events occurred in September 1955

== September 1, 1955 (Thursday) ==
- Born: Bruce Foxton, English bassist, singer and songwriter, in Woking, Surrey

== September 2, 1955 (Friday) ==
- Under the guidance of Dr. Humphry Osmond, TV presenter Christopher Mayhew ingests 400 mg of mescaline hydrochloride and allows himself to be filmed as part of a Panorama special for BBC TV that is never broadcast.

== September 3, 1955 (Saturday) ==
- The first Estadio Ramón de Carranza football stadium is inaugurated, in Cádiz, Spain.
- Died: Duchess Elisabeth Alexandrine of Mecklenburg-Schwerin, 86, German royal consort

== September 4, 1955 (Sunday) ==
- The French tug Ambes capsizes and sinks in the Gironde Estuary following a collision with US ship SS Lipari, with the loss of three crew.
- The first ever European Cup (now UEFA Champions League) game is played, between Sporting CP of Portugal and Partizan of Yugoslavia.

== September 5, 1955 (Monday) ==
- The 1955 UCI Track Cycling World Championships reach their conclusion, in Milan, Italy.

== September 6, 1955 (Tuesday) ==
- Istanbul pogrom: Istanbul's Greek minority is the target of a government-sponsored pogrom. Organized mob attacks continue until the following day.
- Hurricane Gladys makes landfall 140 mi (230 km) south of Brownsville as a Category 1 hurricane with winds of 85 mph (137 km/h). Vacationers evacuate Padre Island in preparation for the storm. Rainfall peaks at 17.02 in (43.2 cm) in Flour Bluff. In Oso Bay, storm surge is reported to have reached 4.5 ft (1.4 m) in height. Two ships off the Texas coast are feared to have been damaged during the storm: the shrimp boat Mary Ellen, thought to have been beached on Padre Island, and the Don II, missing off Port Aransas, Texas. The United States Coast Guard patrols the coast to rescue stranded people and respond to emergency calls, as well as search for the missing ships.
- The Bollywood film Shree 420 is released.

== September 7, 1955 (Wednesday) ==
- A secondary low-pressure area forms near Hurricane Gladys in the Gulf of Mexico. The circulation area is known as Glasscock, after an offshore oil platform that reports 83 mph (134 km/h) winds during the storm.

== September 8, 1955 (Thursday) ==
- The 1955 Individual Speedway World Championship (for motorcyclists) is decided at London's Wembley Stadium, with Peter Craven emerging as champion.

== September 9, 1955 (Friday) ==
- The 16th Venice International Film Festival ends, with Danish drama Ordet winning the Golden Lion award.
- Project Vanguard begins operations. On this date the United States Department of Defense writes a letter to the Department of the Navy authorizing the Naval Research Laboratory to proceed with the Vanguard proposal. The objective of the program is to place a satellite in orbit during the International Geophysical Year (IGY), and responsibility for carrying out the program is placed with the Office of Naval Research.
- The Department of Defense's Stewart Committee reviews the alternatives for an IGY satellite program: wait for the development of an Atlas launcher, use a modified Redstone, or develop a rocket derived from the Viking missile. The committee votes seven to two in favor of abandoning Project Orbiter (Redstone) and developing Vanguard (the Viking derivative). Secretary Donald A. Quarles rules with the committee majority in the Department of Defense Policy Committee, which approves the decision.

== September 10, 1955 (Saturday) ==
- Hurricane Ione forms in the North Atlantic. Arriving on the heels of Hurricanes Connie and Diane, it would compound problems already caused by the two earlier hurricanes.
- Long-running US TV series Gunsmoke is broadcast for the first time, on the CBS-TV network.

== September 11, 1955 (Sunday) ==
- The 1955 Italian Grand Prix is run at Autodromo Nazionale Monza, and is won by Juan Manuel Fangio of Argentina.

== September 12, 1955 (Monday) ==
- Martial law is declared in Turkey as a result of the demonstrations of 6–7 September.

== September 13, 1955 (Tuesday) ==
- Said al-Ghazzi begins his second term as Prime Minister of Syria.
- Roger Seydoux becomes France's last Resident-General in Tunisia.
- Died: Mehdi Qoli Hedayat, 81, Iranian politician and author, former prime minister.

== September 14, 1955 (Wednesday) ==
- Pope Pius XII elevates many of the apostolic vicariates in Africa to Metropolitan Archdioceses.
- Long-running UK children's TV series Crackerjack is broadcast for the first time, by the BBC, with Eamonn Andrews as presenter.
- United States Air Force Pilot 1st Lt. Koren Kolligian Jr., later the namesake for the highest safety award in the USAF, disappears off the coast of California in his Lockheed T-33.
- Born: Pope Leo XIV, Bishop of Rome, as Robert Francis Prevost in Chicago

== September 15, 1955 (Thursday) ==
- Vladimir Nabokov's controversial novel Lolita is published in Paris by Olympia Press.

== September 16, 1955 (Friday) ==
- The East German national airline Deutsche Lufthansa (DLH) makes its first flight, carrying East German prime minister Otto Grotewohl from East Germany to Moscow for a state visit to the Soviet Union.
- Gloster Meteor aircraft of the Argentine Air Force attack the Argentine Navy destroyers Cervantes and La Rioja in the River Plate during the Revolución Libertadora against Juan Perón, inflicting numerous casualties.

== September 17, 1955 (Saturday) ==
- In Venice, Spanish tourism developer Prince Alfonso of Hohenlohe-Langenburg marries 15-year-old Italian model Ira von Fürstenberg.
- The Victorian Football League Grand Final is contested by Melbourne Football Club and Collingwood Football Club at the Melbourne Cricket Ground. The match, attended by 88,053 spectators, gives Melbourne their seventh premiership victory.

== September 18, 1955 (Sunday) ==
- Argentine Naval Aviation aircraft attack an Argentine Army column during the Revolución Libertadora against Juan Perón, halting the column before it can capture a naval air base.
- The United Kingdom formally annexes the uninhabited island of Rockall.

== September 19, 1955 (Monday) ==
- Hurricane Hilda kills about 200 people in Mexico.

== September 20, 1955 (Tuesday) ==
- Pat Morton becomes Leader of the New South Wales Opposition, replacing Murray Robson.

== September 21, 1955 (Wednesday) ==
- The President of Argentina, Juan Perón, is ousted in a military coup.
- Undisputed Heavyweight Champion Rocky Marciano beats Undisputed Light Heavyweight champion Archie Moore by a knockout in round nine
- Born: Israel Katz, Israeli politician and military officer, Minister of Defense (2024-present) in Ashkelon

== September 22, 1955 (Thursday) ==
- Independent Commercial Television (ITV) begins broadcasting in the United Kingdom.
- Born: John Brennan, American intelligence officer, Director of the CIA, in North Bergen, New Jersey

== September 23, 1955 (Friday) ==
- Kyrenia Castle Escape: Sixteen EOKA prisoners escape from Kyrenia Castle in Cyprus by climbing down sheets tied to be a rope.
- In Sumner, Mississippi, an all-white jury acquits both defendants in a trial for the murder of black teenager Emmett Till, after a 67-minute deliberation; one juror says, "If we hadn't stopped to drink pop, it wouldn't have taken that long." J. W. Milam later admits to shooting Till, and says he and his half-brother Roy Bryant did not think that they had done anything wrong.
- A 6.8 earthquake shakes the Chinese county of Huili, leaving 728 dead and 1,547 injured.

== September 24, 1955 (Saturday) ==
- Dwight D. Eisenhower, President of the United States suffers a coronary thrombosis while on vacation in Denver, Colorado. Vice President Richard Nixon serves as Acting President while Eisenhower recovers.
- The body of Glycine Watch SA founder Eugène Meylan, age 64, found beaten and stoned to death.

== September 25, 1955 (Sunday) ==
- Canadian Pacific Railway introduces The Atlantic Limited as a limited stop express passenger service from Windsor Station in Montreal, Quebec to Union Station in Saint John, New Brunswick. The named train replaces previous numbered trains and uses a pool of equipment that includes new stainless steel Budd Company cars purchased for The Canadian. Despite running between two Canadian cities, this service is international, since this CPR route runs across the state of Maine (see: International Railway of Maine).
- The 1955 All-Ireland Senior Football Championship Final takes place at Croke Park, Dublin, and is won by Kerry.

== September 26, 1955 (Monday) ==
- "America's Sweethearts", showbiz couple Eddie Fisher and Debbie Reynolds, marry. They would divorce within four years, and meanwhile Carrie and Todd were born.
- German war criminal Erich Raeder is released from Spandau Prison because of poor health.

== September 27, 1955 (Tuesday) ==
- Operation Sandcastle: UK cargo ship Empire Claire is scuttled with a load of 16,000 German chemical bombs at 56°30′N 12°00′W.

== September 28, 1955 (Wednesday) ==
- The Yukon general election is held to elect the five members of the Yukon Territorial Council.
- The Jaguar Mark 1 2.4 Litre saloon is announced.
- Born: Geir Otto Pedersen, Norwegian diplomat, United Nations special envoy to Syria, in Oslo

== September 29, 1955 (Thursday) ==
- The Indonesian legislative election culminates in a major success for the NU, which sees its number of seats in the People's Representative Council increase from 8 to 45.
- Born: Ken Weatherwax, American actor, best known for his portrayal of Pugsley Addams in The Addams Family, in Los Angeles (d. 2014)

== September 30, 1955 (Friday) ==
- Thai yacht Lelonta II capsizes and sinks off Capraia, Italy. All twenty on board are rescued, including the owner of the yacht, Prince Biram of Siam.
- Died: James Dean, 24, US actor, killed when his automobile collides with another car at a highway junction near Cholame, California.
