= October 1955 =

Month of 1955

<<	October 1955					>>
Su	Mo	Tu	We	Th	Fr	Sa
						1
2	3	4	5	6	7	8
9	10	11	12	13	14	15
16	17	18	19	20	21	22
23	24	25	26	27	28	29
30	31

The following events occurred in October 1955:

== October 1, 1955 (Saturday) ==
- Chile's Finance minister Abraham Perez resigns as a result of disagreements with President Carlos Ibáñez del Campo.

== October 2, 1955 (Sunday) ==
- Xinjiang becomes an autonomous region of the People's Republic of China.
- The kibbutz of Nir Oz is founded in Israel, initially as a Nahal settlement.

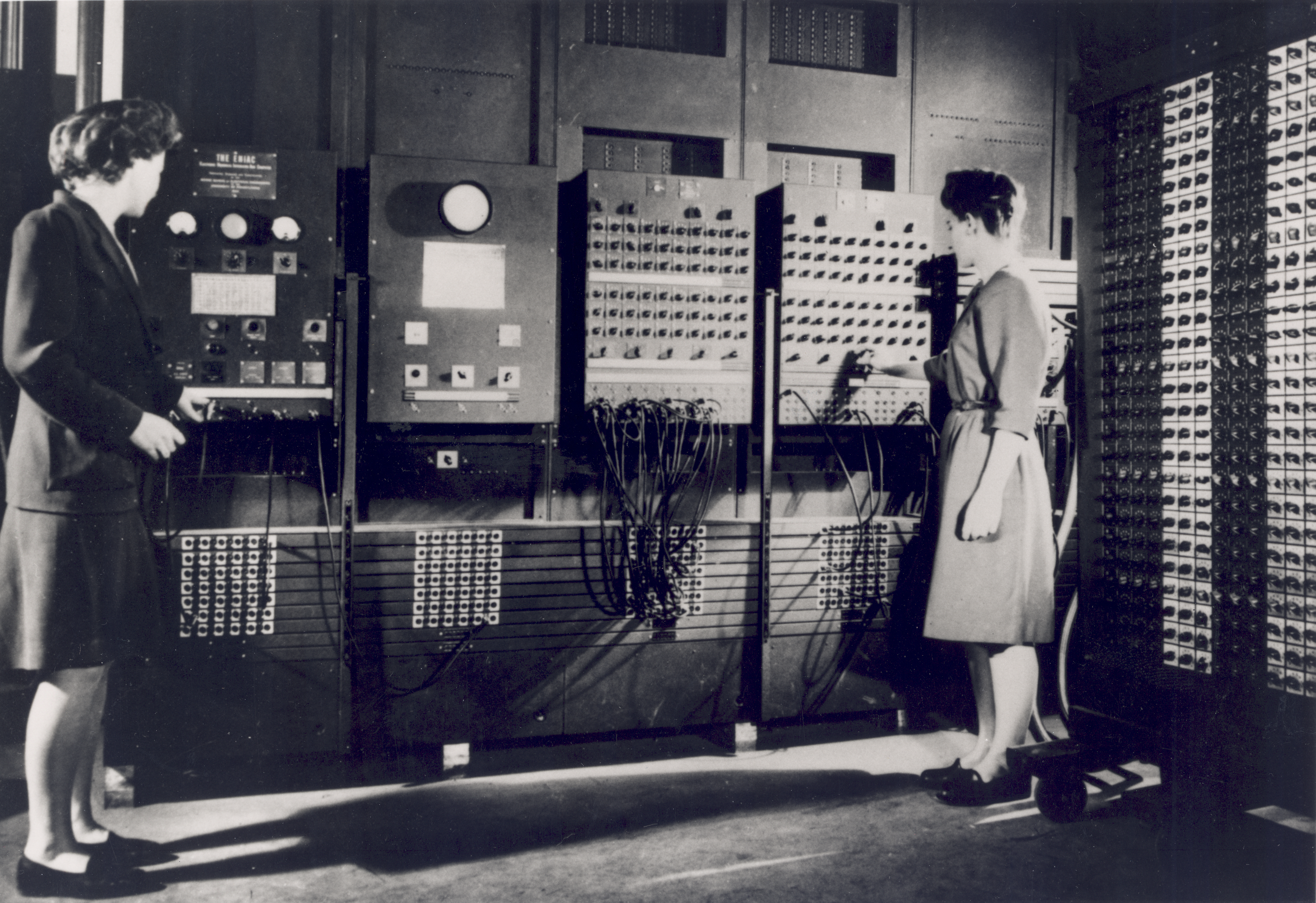
October 2: ENIAC deactivated

- The ENIAC computer is deactivated at Aberdeen Proving Ground, Maryland, USA, having been in continuous operation since 1947.
- The National Academy of Sciences establishes a Technical Panel for Earth Satellite Program, with Richard E. Porter serving as chairman.
- Alfred Hitchcock Presents is broadcast for the first time, on the CBS TV network in the United States.

== October 3, 1955 (Monday) ==
- Norodom Sihanouk, former King of Cambodia, takes office as the country's Prime Minister.

== October 4, 1955 (Tuesday) ==
- The Reverend Sun Myung Moon is released from prison in Seoul, South Korea.
- The Brooklyn Dodgers win the World Series baseball competition by 4 games to 3 over the New York Yankees for the franchise's first World Series championship. The Series MVP is pitcher Johnny Podres of Brooklyn.
- West German cargo ship Fechenheim runs aground at Oslo, Norway, and breaks in two. All 42 crew are rescued.

== October 5, 1955 (Wednesday) ==
- Under an agreement with Walt Disney, Jack Wrather opens the Disneyland Hotel, first hotel to officially bear the Disney name.

== October 6, 1955 (Thursday) ==
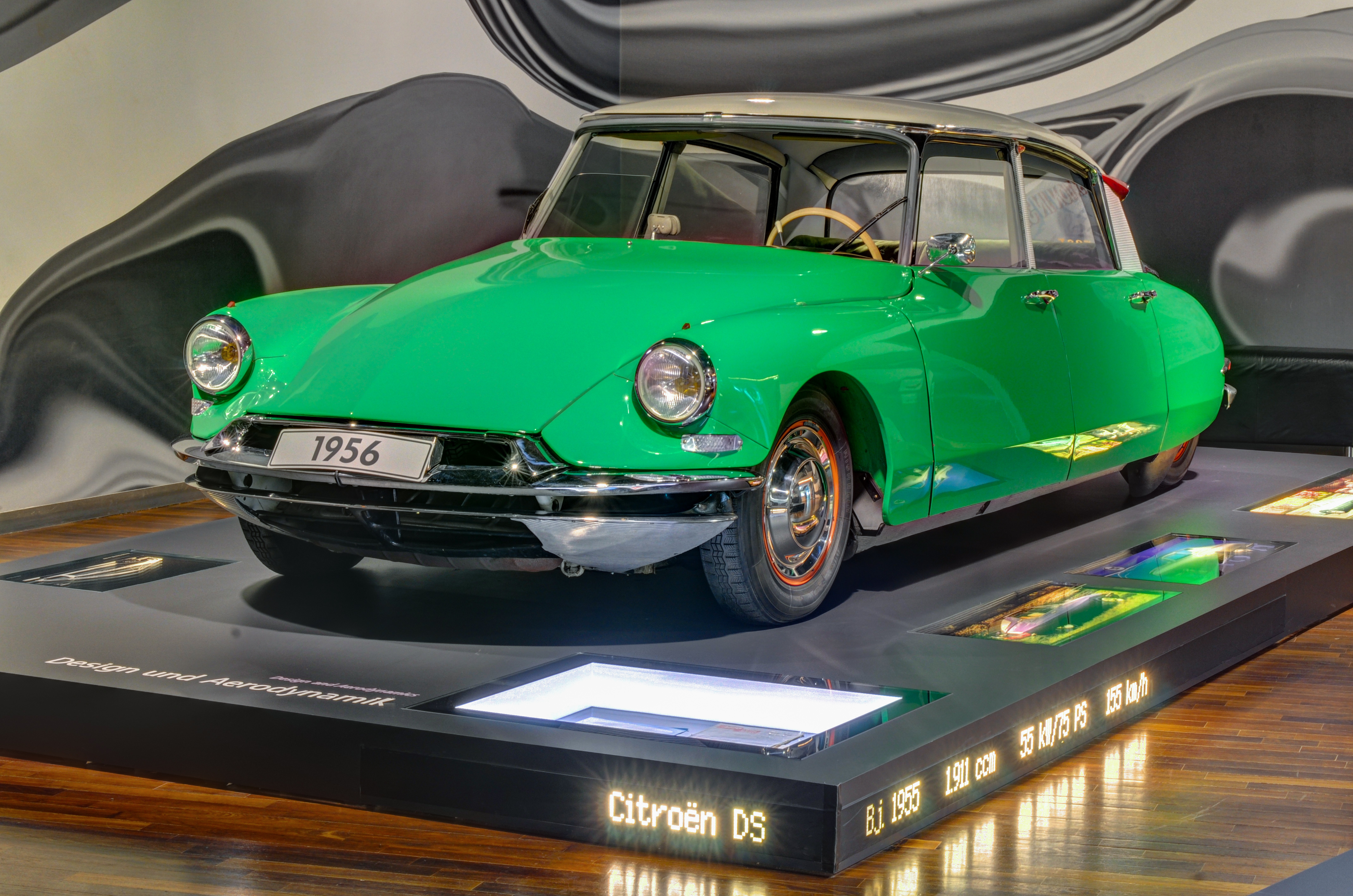
October 6: Citroen DS launched

- The Citroen DS saloon car is launched at the Paris Motor Show.
- A Douglas DC-4 operating as United Airlines Flight 409 crashes in the Medicine Bow Mountains near Centennial, Wyoming, killing all 66 on board. It will tie with the March 22 crash of a U.S. Navy Douglas R6D-1 Liftmaster in Hawaii and the August 11 mid-air collision of two United States Air Force C-119G Flying Boxcars over West Germany as the deadliest air accident of 1955.
- Norwegian cargo ship Thorodd founders in a storm south of Risør, Norway. The crew are rescued by the cutter Grant.

== October 7, 1955 (Friday) ==
- First reading by Allen Ginsberg of Howl at the Six Gallery Reading, San Francisco, California.
- Born: Yo-Yo Ma, American cellist to Chinese parents, in Paris, France

== October 8, 1955 (Saturday) ==
- In Australian rules football, Perth 11.11 (77) defeat East Fremantle 11.9 (75) for their first premiership since 1907 in champion ruckman Merv McIntosh’s final match.

== October 9, 1955 (Sunday) ==
- Died: Theodor Innitzer, 79, Austrian priest, Cardinal Archbishop of Vienna

== October 10, 1955 (Monday) ==
- Helicopters from the U.S. Navy aircraft carrier USS Saipan (CVL-48) play a key role in rescuing people stranded by flooding in Tampico, Mexico.

== October 11, 1955 (Tuesday) ==
- The Rodgers and Hammerstein musical film Oklahoma!, the first feature photographed in the Todd-AO 70 mm widescreen process, is released in the USA.
- British cargo ship Wallsend runs aground at Hook of Holland, Netherlands but is refloated by 13 October.

== October 12, 1955 (Wednesday) ==
- The Spanish coaster Conde de Barbate collides with the French ship Columbie and sinks off Vigo with the loss of all five crew.
- The 1955 World Weightlifting Championships open in Munich, West Germany.

== October 13, 1955 (Thursday) ==
- Mosaburō Suzuki becomes Chair of the unified Japanese Socialist Party/Social Democratic Party of Japan.
- Died: Manuel Ávila Camacho, 58, Mexican politician, President 1940-46; Blessed Alexandrina of Balazar, 51, Portuguese mystic

== October 14, 1955 (Friday) ==
- The North-West Frontier Province of British India is merged into the new province of West Pakistan. Other Indian states dissolved on this date included Makran and Kharan.

== October 15, 1955 (Saturday) ==
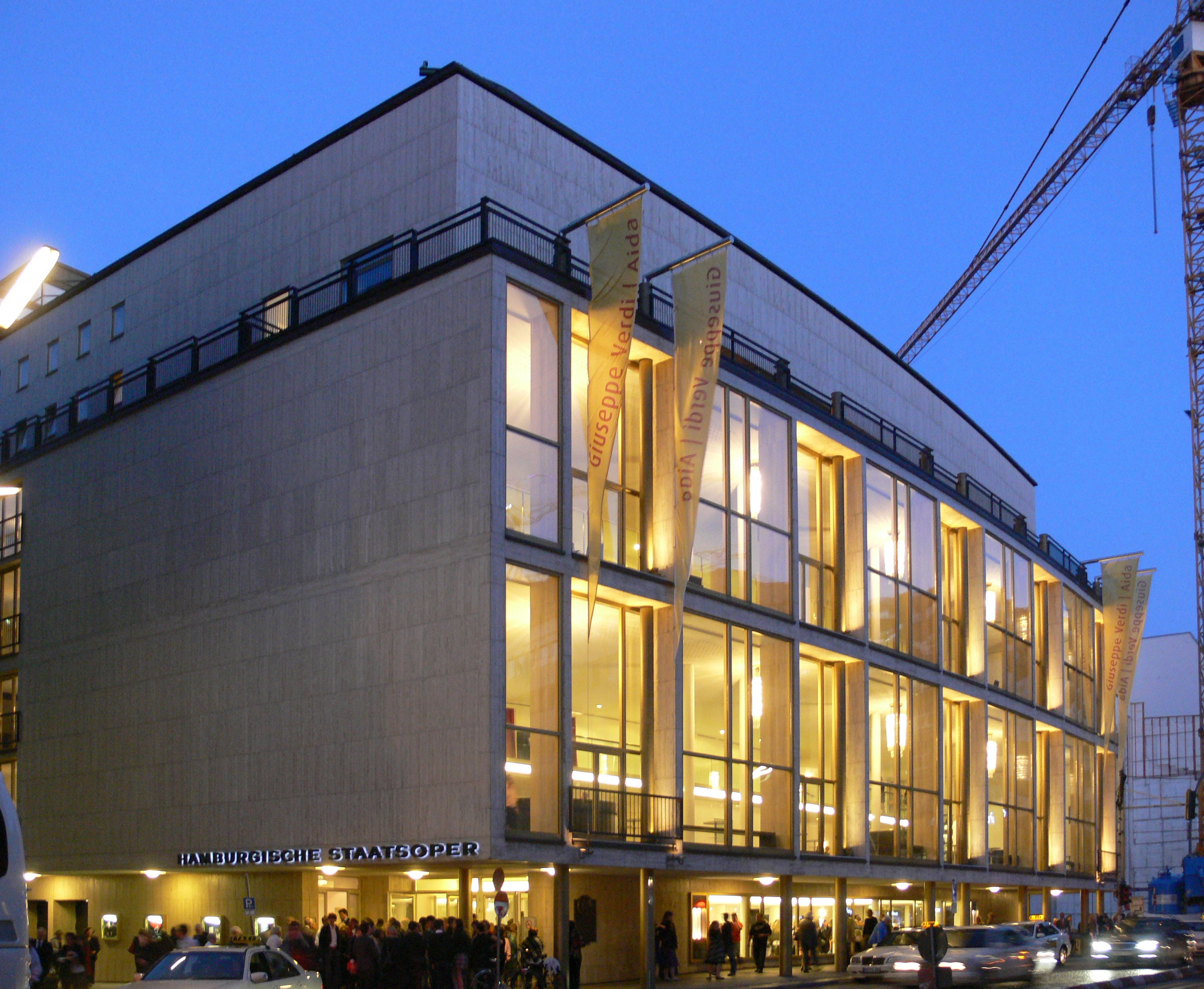
October 15: Opening of new Hamburg State Opera

- The new Hamburg State Opera opens with a performance of Mozart's Die Zauberflöte.

== October 16, 1955 (Sunday) ==
- The Boeing 367-80 (a Boeing 707 prototype) crosses the United States in a record time of 3 hours 58 minutes.
- British hydroplane Bluebird K7 sinks in Lake Mead, United States, but is later salvaged and returned to service.
- Ceremonial last day of steam locomotives on the Long Island Rail Road.

== October 17, 1955 (Monday) ==
- Died: Dimitrios Maximos, 82, Greek banker and politician, prime minister in 1947

== October 18, 1955 (Tuesday) ==
- A U.S. Navy Convair R3Y-1 Tradewind flying boat sets a speed record for a flight from Hawaii to the continental United States, flying from Honolulu, Hawaii, to Naval Air Station Alameda, California, in 6 hours 45 minutes at an average speed of 360 mph (579 km/h).
- Former emperor and head of state of Vietnam, Bảo Đại, formally dismisses his prime minister, Ngô Đình Diệm.

== October 19, 1955 (Wednesday) ==
- Died: Eugène Joseph Delporte, 73, Belgian astronomer; John Hodiak, 41, US actor (heart attack)

== October 20, 1955 (Thursday) ==
- In the United States, WERE (AM)-Cleveland disc jockey Bill Randle presents a concert at Brooklyn High School in Brooklyn, Ohio, opened by Elvis Presley and featuring Pat Boone and Bill Haley & His Comets. It is Presley's first performance north of the Mason–Dixon line and his first filmed performance, for a documentary on Randle titled The Pied Piper of Cleveland.
- The fifth Miss World contest is held at the Lyceum Ballroom in London, UK, and is won by Susana Duijm, representing Venezuela.

== October 21, 1955 (Friday) ==
- The Pro Arte Orchestra, conducted by Sir Malcolm Sargent, gives its first concert at the Royal Festival Hall.

== October 22, 1955 (Saturday) ==
- The Fort Macquarie Tram Depot in Sydney, Australia, is closed. Sydney Opera House would later be built on the site.
- In the Scottish League Cup Final at Hampden Park, Glasgow, Aberdeen defeat St Mirren 2-1.

== October 23, 1955 (Sunday) ==
- A referendum is held in South Vietnam to determine the future form of government of the State of Vietnam. Three days later, Ngô Đình Diệm proclaims the creation of the Republic of Vietnam, naming himself as its president.

== October 24, 1955 (Monday) ==
- The train ferry MV Essex Ferry is launched at Harwich, United Kingdom.

== October 25, 1955 (Tuesday) ==
- Sir Patrick Muir Renison replaces Sir Alfred Savage as Governor of British Guiana.
- Saab 35 Draken First flight

== October 26, 1955 (Wednesday) ==
- After the last Allied troops have left the country and following the provisions of the Austrian Independence Treaty, Austria declares its permanent neutrality.
- Ngô Đình Diệm proclaims Vietnam to be a republic with himself as its President (following the State of Vietnam referendum on October 23) and forms the Army of the Republic of Vietnam.
- Mexican coaster Antonio Sanchez Valdes sinks in the Caribbean off the coast of Mexico with the loss of all 25 crew.

== October 27, 1955 (Thursday) ==
- The Marriage Act 1955 (New Zealand) receives Royal Assent, repealing the Marriage Act 1908.

== October 28, 1955 (Friday) ==
- Swedish cargo ship Karmas runs aground at the mouth of the River Tees, Northumberland, United Kingdom; it is refloated on 10 November.
- The US ocean liner William Lykes runs aground in Table Bay, South Africa; it is refloated on 31 October.
- Born: Bill Gates, US software designer and entrepreneur, in Seattle, Washington

== October 29, 1955 (Saturday) ==
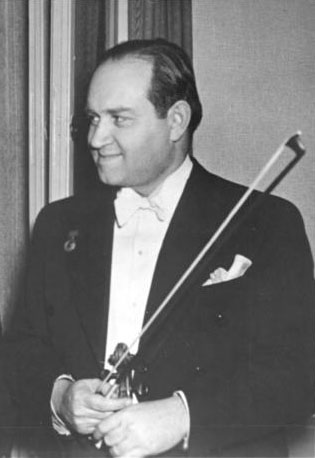
October 29: David Oistrakh premieres Shostakovich's first Violin Concerto

- An explosion, likely caused by a World War II–era naval mine, capsizes the Soviet battleship Novorossiysk at her moorings in the Crimean harbor of Sevastopol with the loss of 608 men.
- Dmitri Shostakovich's Violin Concerto No. 1, originally completed in 1948, is premiered by the Leningrad Philharmonic Orchestra with its dedicatee, David Oistrakh, as soloist.

== October 30, 1955 (Sunday) ==
- In the Swiss federal election, the Social Democratic Party emerges as the largest party in the National Council, winning 53 of the 196 seats.
- The Rimutaka Incline mountain railway in New Zealand closes, to be replaced by the Rimutaka Tunnel.
- In the US, The Union Pacific Railroad's Overland Route passenger trains shift from the Chicago and North Western Railway to the Chicago, Milwaukee, St. Paul and Pacific Railroad (the "Milwaukee Road") east of Council Bluffs, Iowa.
- The 1955 NASCAR Grand National Series ends, with Tim Flock winning the championship by a margin of 1508 points over Buck Baker.
- The moshav of Yad Rambam is founded in central Israel.
- Died: William Woodward, Jr., 35, US businessman and racehorse owner, shot dead by his wife Ann, who mistook him for a burglar

== October 31, 1955 (Monday) ==
- Princess Margaret, sister of Queen Elizabeth II of the United Kingdom, announces that she does not intend to marry Group Captain Peter Townsend, thus ending media speculation and controversy.
