= Mount Yahiko =

Mountain in Niigata Prefecture, Japan

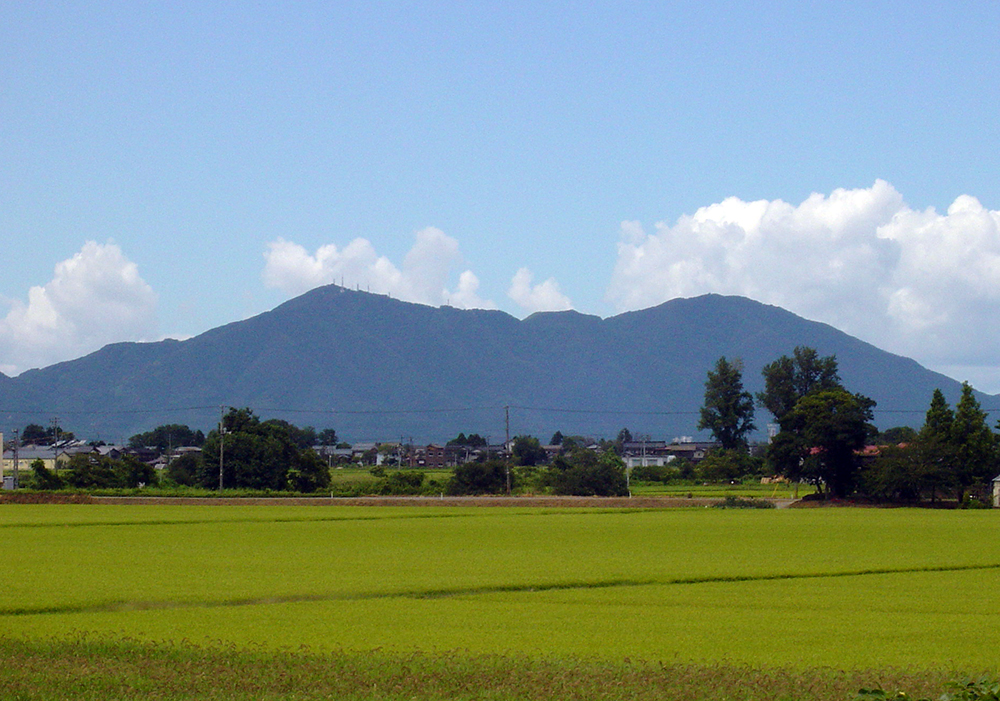
- Mount Yahiko (left) seen from Sakae PA

Highest point
- Elevation: 634 m (2,080 ft)
- Coordinates: 37°42′17″N 138°48′32″E

Geography
- Location within Japan Location within Niigata Prefecture
- Location: Niigata Prefecture, Japan

Mount Yahiko (弥彦山, Yahiko-yama) is a mountain located in Niigata Prefecture, Japan.

The Yahikoyama Ropeway runs between the base and summit of the mountain.

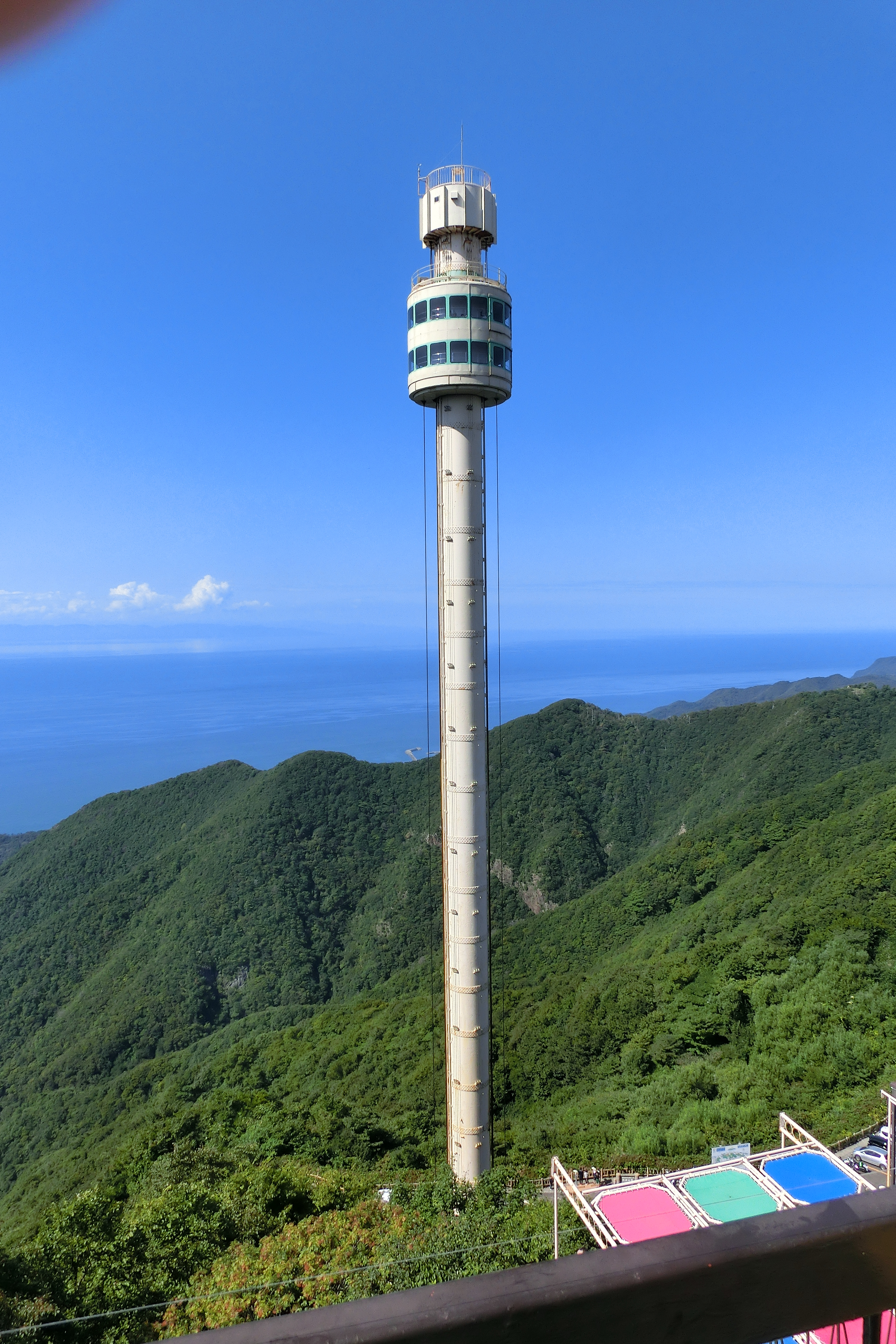
Panorama Tower

== Gallery ==
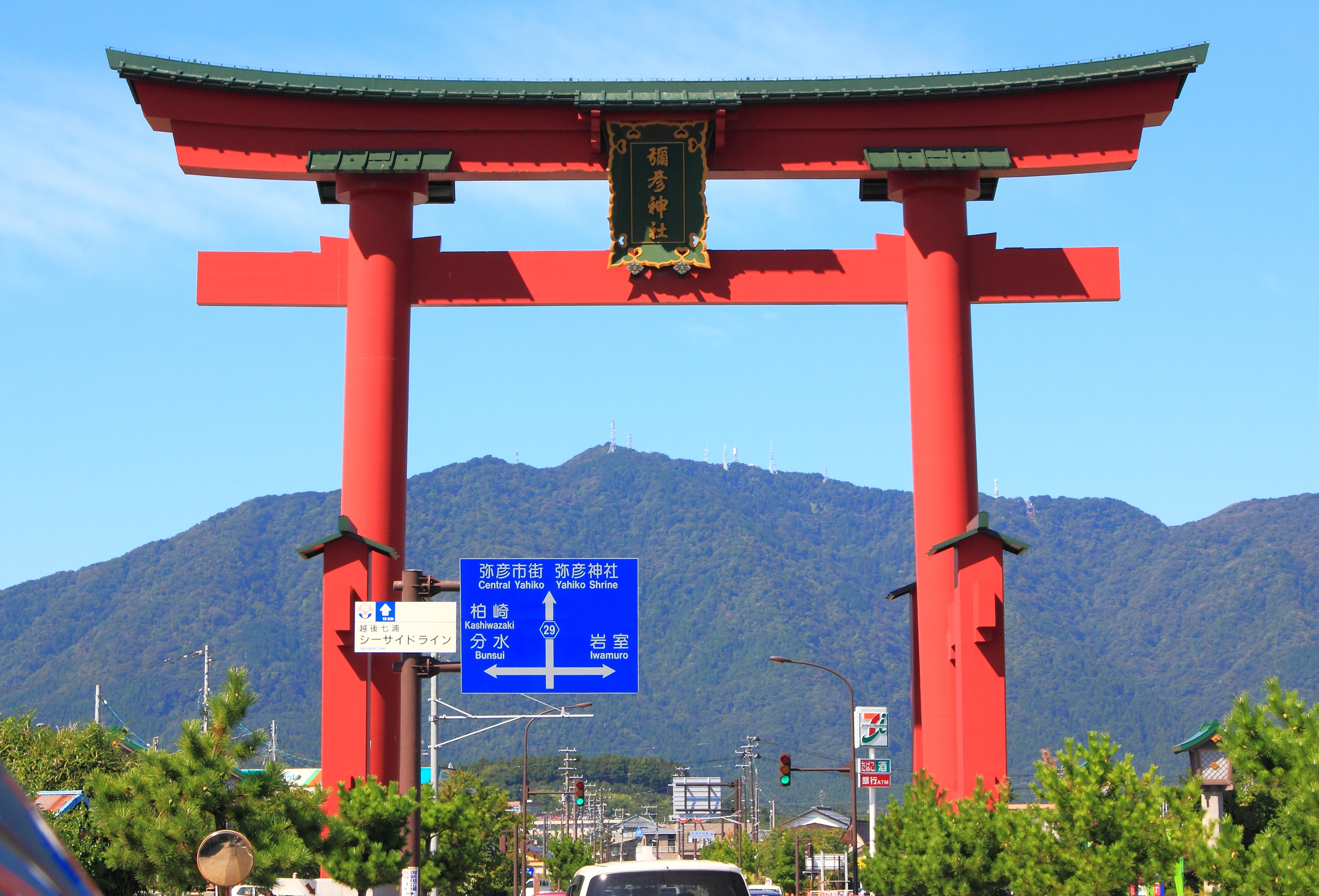
Huge Torii gate and Mount Yahiko, near Yahagi Station

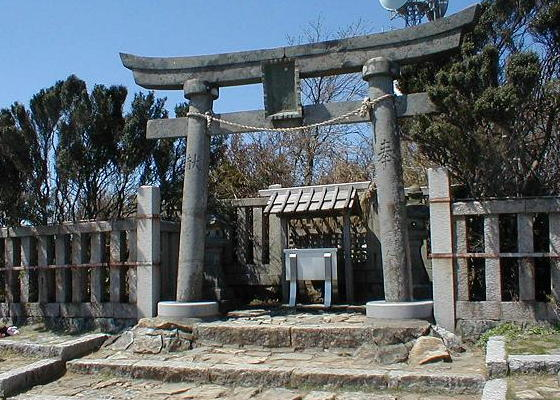
Peak of Mount Yahiko

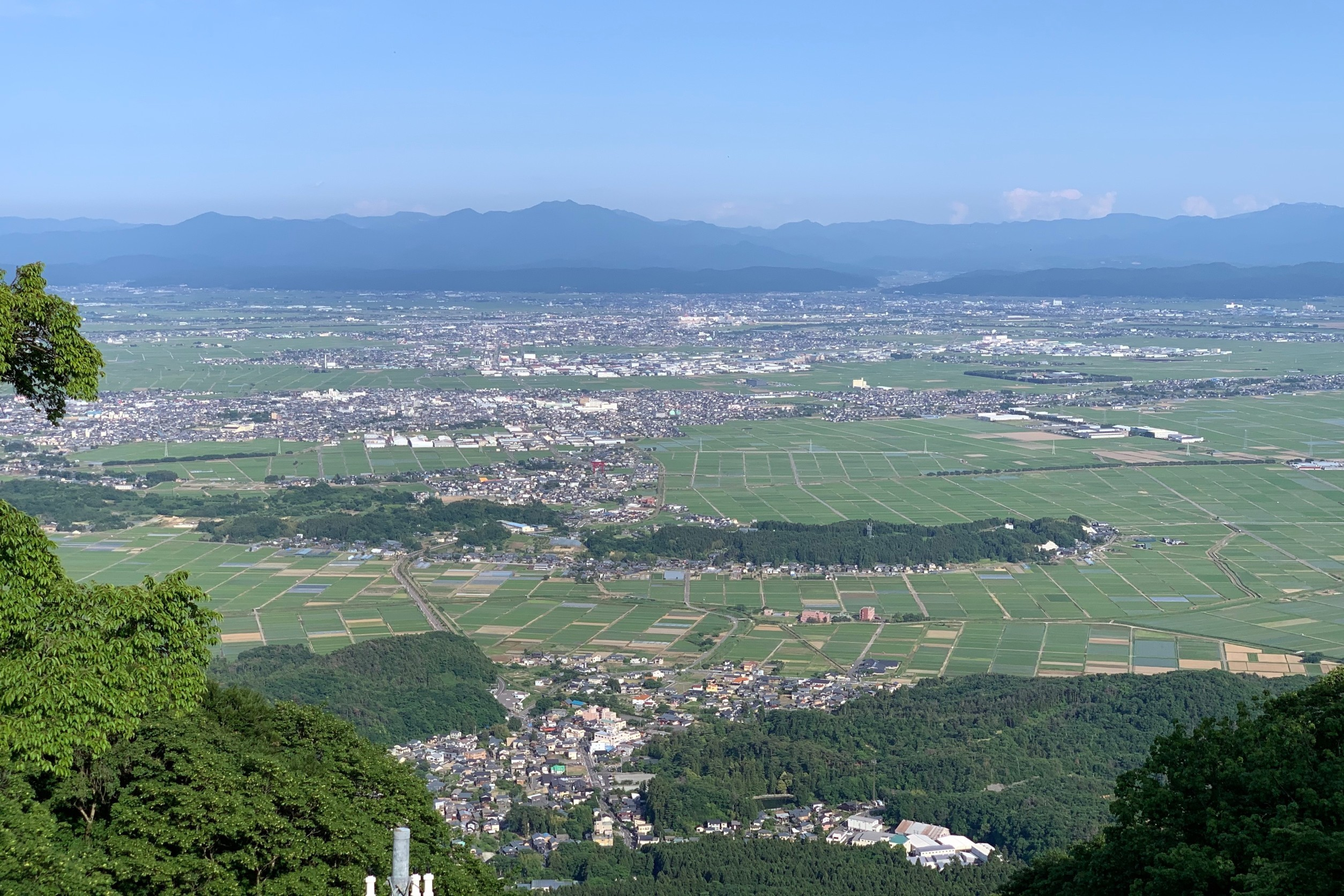
View from Mount Yahiko, June 2020

== See also ==
- Yahiko Shrine
- Yahiko, Niigata
