= February 1956 =

Month of 1956

<<	February 1956					>>
Su	Mo	Tu	We	Th	Fr	Sa
			1	2	3	4
5	6	7	8	9	10	11
12	13	14	15	16	17	18
19	20	21	22	23	24	25
26	27	28	29

February 1956 was the second month of that leap year. The month which began on a Wednesday and ended after 29 days on a Wednesday.

The following events occurred in February 1956:

== February 1, 1956 (Wednesday) ==
- France's Socialist leader, Guy Mollet, becomes prime minister, heading a centre-left coalition called the Republican Front.
- The Army Ballistic Missile Agency (ABMA) is activated at Redstone Arsenal, Huntsville, Alabama, to complete the development of the Redstone missile and to develop the Jupiter missile. The Redstone is later used in two Mercury crewed suborbital flights, and in other research and development flights.
- Born: Brahmanandam, Indian actor and comedian, in Sattenapalli

== February 2, 1956 (Thursday) ==
- The world première of Eugene O'Neill's semi-autobiographical play Long Day's Journey into Night (written in 1942) takes place at the Royal Dramatic Theatre, Stockholm, in a Swedish language production directed by Bengt Ekerot and starring Lars Hanson. It would not appear on Broadway until November of the same year.
- The Israeli Defence Force prevents an Egyptian delegation from attending a meeting of the Egypt-Israel Mixed Armistice Commission at Auja al-Hafir.
- The Austrian Government announced the establishment of diplomatic relations with Israel.

== February 3, 1956 (Friday) ==
- Panamanian cargo ship Rosalind sinks 120 nautical miles (220 km) south of Crete. All crew are rescued by the Italian ship San Carlo.
- Norwegian cargo ship Dovrefjell runs aground on the Pentland Skerries, Orkney Islands, Scotland. All 41 crew members are rescued by Royal Air Force and Royal Navy helicopters.
- Sonny Ramadhin takes 6 New Zealand wickets for West Indies cricket team in the first innings of the first Test Match of their tour at Dunedin.
- Died: Émile Borel, 85, French mathematician

== February 4, 1956 (Saturday) ==
- East Germany's national airline Deutsche Lufthansa (DLH), established in the previous year, begins scheduled passenger flights between East Berlin and Warsaw, Poland.

== February 5, 1956 (Sunday) ==
- The 1956 Winter Olympics conclude in Cortina d'Ampezzo, Italy, with a firework display.
- The Free Cinema movement begins in the UK by showing documentary films at the National Film Theatre, London.
- Born: Betty Ong, American flight attendant who was the first person to alert authorities to the hijacking of American Airlines Flight 11 during the September 11 attacks; in San Francisco (d. 2001)

== February 6, 1956 (Monday) ==
- Born: Natalia Linichuk, Russian ice dancer and coach, in Moscow

== February 7, 1956 (Tuesday) ==
- Born: John Nielsen, Danish racing driver

== February 8, 1956 (Wednesday) ==
- 1956 Hawker Hunter multiple aircraft accident: Eight aircraft from RAF West Raynham Hawker Hunter jet fighters are diverted to RAF Marham after completing a combat exercise. Only two manage to land successfully; the remaining six are lost as a result of a combination of poor visibility and fuel shortage. Four pilots eject, one survives a crash and the sixth is killed.
- The Treaty of London 1956 is signed, establishing the independent Federation of Malaya
- Died: Connie Mack (Cornelius Alexander McGillicuddy), 93, US baseball player and manager

== February 9, 1956 (Thursday) ==
- US Secretary of State John Foster Dulles, with the concurrence of the Joint Chiefs of Staff of the Department of Defense, authorizes an additional 350 US military personnel to go to South Vietnam to salvage an estimated $1 billion worth of military equipment abandoned by French troops.
- Samuel J. Seymour makes an appearance on the TV show I've Got a Secret and revealed that he had witnessed the assassination of President Abraham Lincoln on April 14, 1865, at Ford's Theatre in Washington, D.C.

== February 10, 1956 (Friday) ==
- The Brazilian cargo ship Loide-Honduras runs aground on Long Sand Bank, in the Thames Estuary, UK. A British ship, ST Rumania, is sent to assist but runs aground on the same sandbank and sinks.
- The British ship MV Conlea founders 15 nautical miles (28 km) off La Corbière, Jersey.
- In the first stage of an Australian government reshuffle, Howard Beale is replaced as Minister for Supply and Minister for Defence Production by Athol Townley. Shortly afterwards, Beale is appointed Australian Ambassador to the United States of America.
- An extreme cold wave hit many Central European countries, including Germany on that day, which caused many locations to record all time cold records, including Waldsassen at −36.3 °C (−33.3 °F).
- Died: Wilbert Coffin, 40, Canadian prospector and convicted murderer, executed after seven reprieves.

== February 11, 1956 (Saturday) ==
- British spies Guy Burgess and Donald Maclean appear in the Soviet Union, five years after vanishing from the UK.
- The Rock Island Line Aerotrain “Jet Rocket” begins service between Chicago and Peoria, Illinois.
- The 1956–57 Israel State Cup football competition opens.

== February 12, 1956 (Sunday) ==
- In Malta, a referendum on integration with the United Kingdom finds that 77% of voters are in favour of the proposals. Despite this, the plans are never implemented.

== February 13, 1956 (Monday) ==
- An "Exhibition of works of Soviet artists of 1917-1956" opens in Moscow, featuring Mikhail Avilov, Aleksandr Gerasimov, Aleksandr Deyneka, and other important Soviet artists.
- The Leningrad Institute of Painting, Sculpture and Architecture named after Ilya Repin graduated Engels Kozlov, Nikolai Pozdneev, Piotr Nazarov, Anatoli Nenartovich, and other famous artists of the future.

== February 14, 1956 (Tuesday) ==
- 1956 Santiago rail crash: Near the Chilean capital Santiago, on the branch line to Cartagena, a train runs into the back of another, killing 23 people and injuring a further 198.
- The 20th Congress of the Communist Party of the Soviet Union opens.
- Born: Dave Dravecky, baseball pitcher in Youngstown, Ohio. Broke his arm due to a malignant tumor while pitching for the San Francisco Giants in 1989.

== February 15, 1956 (Wednesday) ==
- Irish Senator Owen Sheehy-Skeffington introduces a parliamentary motion calling for the prohibition of all corporal punishment for girls in Irish national schools.

== February 16, 1956 (Thursday) ==
- British hopper barge No. 24 collides with SS Indus and sinks in the River Mersey. All eleven of her crew are rescued.
- The 1956 World Figure Skating Championships open in Garmisch, West Germany.
- Just over four months after the release of the Todd-AO 70 mm version of Oklahoma!, the screen version of Rodgers and Hammerstein's Carousel, featuring the same stars, Gordon MacRae and Shirley Jones, is released in CinemaScope 55.

== February 17, 1956 (Friday) ==
- At the World Figure Skating Championships in Garmisch, Pamela Weight and Paul Thomas of the UK win the Ice dance title. Ice dance will not be recognised as an Olympic sport until 1976.

== February 18, 1956 (Saturday) ==
- 1956 Scottish Airlines Malta air disaster: An engine fire breaks out on a Scottish Airlines Avro York just after takeoff from Malta International Airport. The aircraft stalls while the pilot is attempting to turn back, and crashes near Zurrieq, killing all fifty people on board.
- An earthquake of magnitude 7.3 strikes the Izu Islands of Japan.
- The 1955/1956 News of the World Snooker Tournament concludes in Manchester, UK, with a win for Joe Davis.
- Born: Bidzina Ivanishvili, Georgian-French billionaire oligarch and politician, in Chorvila, Georgian SSR
- Died: Gustave Charpentier, 95, French composer

== February 19, 1956 (Sunday) ==
- British collier ship Corchester collides with SS City of Sydney near the Haisborough Light Vessel, off the coast of Norfolk, UK, and sinks; eight of her 21 crew lose their lives.

== February 20, 1956 (Monday) ==
- An earthquake of magnitude 6.2 with a maximum Mercalli intensity of VIII (Severe), strikes the Eskişehir region of Turkey, causing four deaths.
- Tunku Abdul Rahman, Chief Minister of the Federation of Malaya announces in Malacca Town that Malaya will become independent on 31 August 1957.

== February 21, 1956 (Tuesday) ==
- Ett Dockhem, a Swedish-language film of Henrik Ibsen's play A Doll's House, starring Mai Zetterling, is premièred in Stockholm.

== February 22, 1956 (Wednesday) ==
- Elvis Presley enters the United States music charts for the first time, with "Heartbreak Hotel".

== February 23, 1956 (Thursday) ==
- Norma Jean Mortenson legally changes her name to Marilyn Monroe.
- Fire breaks out at Eastwood Mills, Keighley, Yorkshire, UK, killing eight employees.

== February 24, 1956 (Friday) ==
- The General Union of Algerian Workers (UGTA) is formed in Algeria.
- Doris Day records her best-known hit, "Que Sera, Sera (Whatever Will Be, Will Be)"; the song is performed by Day in Alfred Hitchcock's The Man Who Knew Too Much.
- Born: Judith Butler, US political philosopher, in Cleveland, Ohio

== February 25, 1956 (Saturday) ==
- Khrushchev Thaw: Nikita Khrushchev attacks the veneration of Josef Stalin in a speech "On the Cult of Personality and Its Consequences", in a closed session concluding the 20th Congress of the Communist Party of the Soviet Union. This is not officially made public in the Soviet Union at this time but becomes known in the West in June.

== February 26, 1956 (Sunday) ==
- Born: Michel Houellebecq, French author, in Réunion

== February 27, 1956 (Monday) ==
- Poets Ted Hughes and Sylvia Plath meet for the first time, in Cambridge, UK.

== February 28, 1956 (Tuesday) ==
- Born: Francis Hughes, Irish Republican activist, in Bellaghy, Northern Ireland (died 1981 while on hunger strike)

== February 29, 1956 (Wednesday) ==
- Abdullahi Issa Muhammad becomes Prime Minister of Somalia following the parliamentary elections.
- Turkish cargo ship Sapanca collides in the River Scheldt, Belgium, with Dutch ship SS Blommersdijk and sinks. All 35 crew members are rescued by Blommersdijk.
- Born: Aileen Wuornos, American serial killer, in Rochester, Michigan (executed 2002)
