= Yahiko Velodrome =

Velodrome in Yahiko, Niigata, Japan

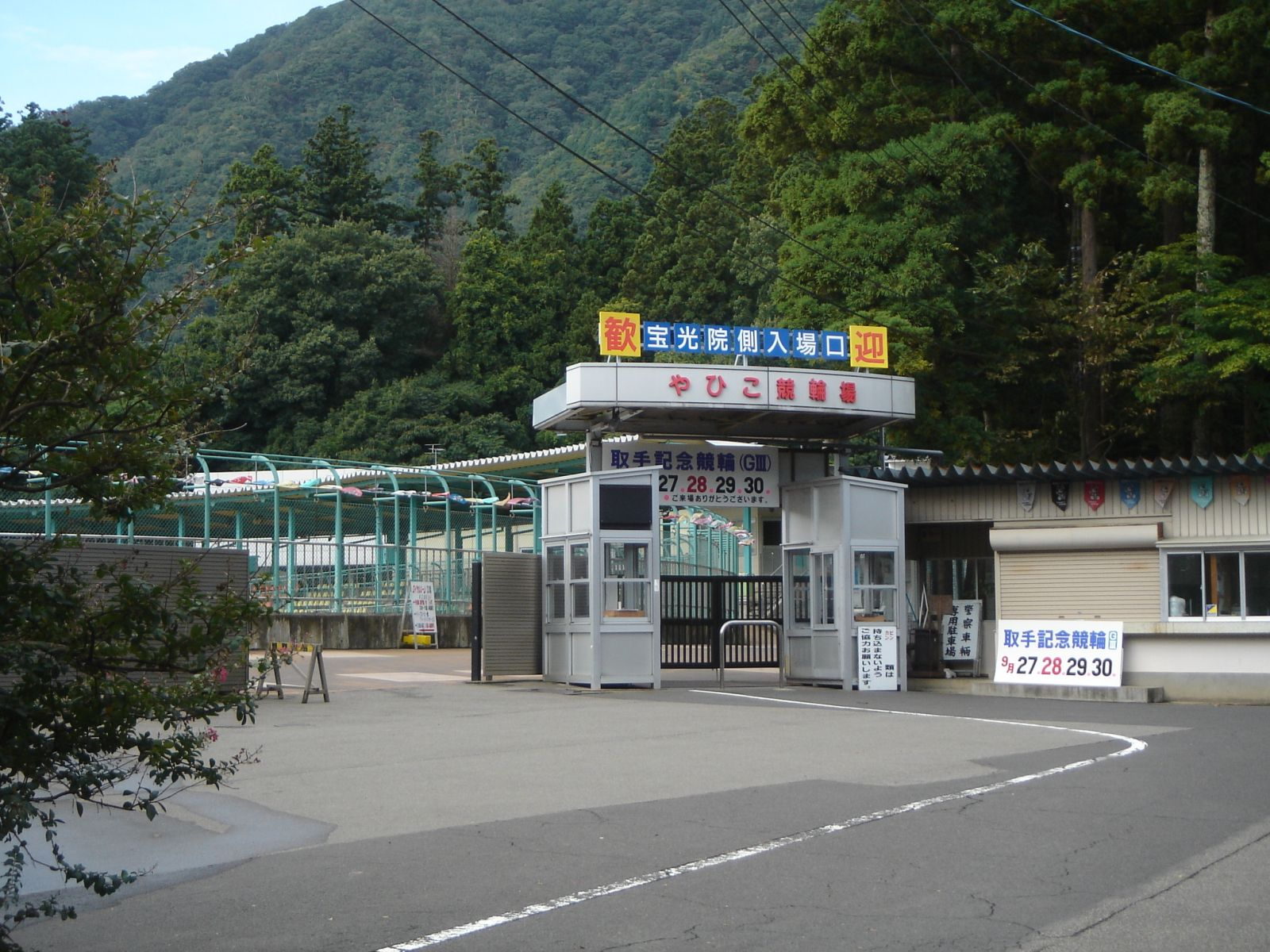
- Interactive map of Yahiko Velodrome
- Location: Yahiko, Niigata, Japan
- Coordinates: 37°42′26″N 138°49′41″E
- Owner: Yahiko village
- Operator: Yahiko village

Construction
- Opened: April 28, 1950

Website
- Official website

Yahiko Velodrome (弥彦競輪場, Yahiko Keirinjyō) is a velodrome located in Yahiko, Niigata that conducts pari-mutuel Keirin racing - one of Japan's four authorized "Public Sports" (公営競技, kōei kyōgi) where gambling is permitted. Its Keirin identification number for betting purposes is 21# (21 sharp).

Yahiko's oval is 400 meters in circumference. A typical keirin race of 2,025 meters consists of five laps around the course.

Because of its location in Niigata Prefecture near the Sea of Japan, races at Yahiko Velodrome are held during warm weather months, from April to November.

== See also ==
- List of cycling tracks and velodromes
