= 1955 Sydney to Hobart Yacht Race =

Annual yacht race in Australia

11th Sydney to Hobart Yacht Race
Date	26 December 1955 – 4 January 1955
Defender	Solveig
Number of yachts	17
Coordinates	33°51.35′S 151°12.40′E- 42°52.7′S 147°19.58′E
Winner	Even
Official website	https://web.archive.org/web/20091030152304/http://rolexsydneyhobart.com/default.asp

The 1955 Sydney to Hobart Yacht Race, was the eleventh annual running of the "blue water classic" Sydney to Hobart Yacht Race.

Hosted by the Cruising Yacht Club of Australia based in Sydney, New South Wales, the 1955 edition began on Sydney Harbour, at noon on Boxing Day (26 December 1955), before heading south for 630 nautical miles (1,170 km) through the Tasman Sea, past Bass Strait, into Storm Bay and up the River Derwent, to cross the finish line in Hobart, Tasmania.

The 1955 Sydney to Hobart Yacht Race comprised a fleet of 17 competitors, the same number as in the 1954 race. Line-honours were awarded to Even, which raced out of New South Wales and was owned and skippered by Frederick John Palmer.

== 1955 fleet ==
17 yachts registered to begin the 1953 Sydney to Hobart Yacht race. They are:

Yacht	Nation	Owner	Skipper	Launch year
Even	(Australia) (NSW)	F.J. Palmer	F.J. Palmer	
Kurrewa IV		F. & J. Livingston	F. & J. Livingston	
Nell Gwynn		R .Hickman	R. Hickman	
Solo		V. Meyer	V.'Meyer	
Cooroyba		C. Haselgrove	C. Haselgrove	
Moonbi		H.S. Evans	H.S. Evans	
Janzoon		W.R. Slade	W.R. Slade	
Southern Myth		N. Howard	N. Howard	
Carol J		J. Halliday	J. Halliday	
Winston Churchill		A.G. Warner	A.G. Warner	
Lass O'Luss		J. Colquhoun	J. Colquhoun	
Tam O'Shanter		RAN College	RAN College	
Defiance		N.D. Rundle	N.D. Rundle	
Trade Winds		M.E. Davey	M.E. Davey	
Fantasy		D. Burridge	D. Burridge	
Patience		A.B. Wilson	A.B. Wilson	
Wanderer		E. Massey	E. Massey	

== Results ==
Line Honours	LH (elapsed) time d:hh:mm:ss	Handicap Winner	HW (corrected) time d:hh:mm:ss
Even	4:18:13:14	Moonbi	3:09:21:05

== See also ==
- Sydney to Hobart Yacht Race
