= 1955 Dominican Republic Constitutional Assembly election =

Dominican elections

Constitutional Assembly elections were held in the Dominican Republic on 13 November 1955. The role of the Assembly was to review and amend certain articles of the constitution.
