= Wetzcon 1956 =

Wetzcon 1956, held on 14–15 January 1956, was the first science fiction convention held in Germany. Held in Wetzlar, it was organized by German science fiction fanzine publisher Anne Steul (who lived in Wetzlar); British fan Julian Parr, who worked for the British Consulate-General in Düsseldorf (Parr had helped found Science Fiction Club Deutschland in 1955, and held membership number 2 therein); and American twin teenagers Greg and Jim Benford, who were living in Giessen, where their father was serving with the United States Army

In 2015, Science Fiction Club Deutschland celebrated its 60th anniversary by holding Wetzcon II in Wetzlar.
