= Yahiko, Niigata =

Yahiko 弥彦村
- Village
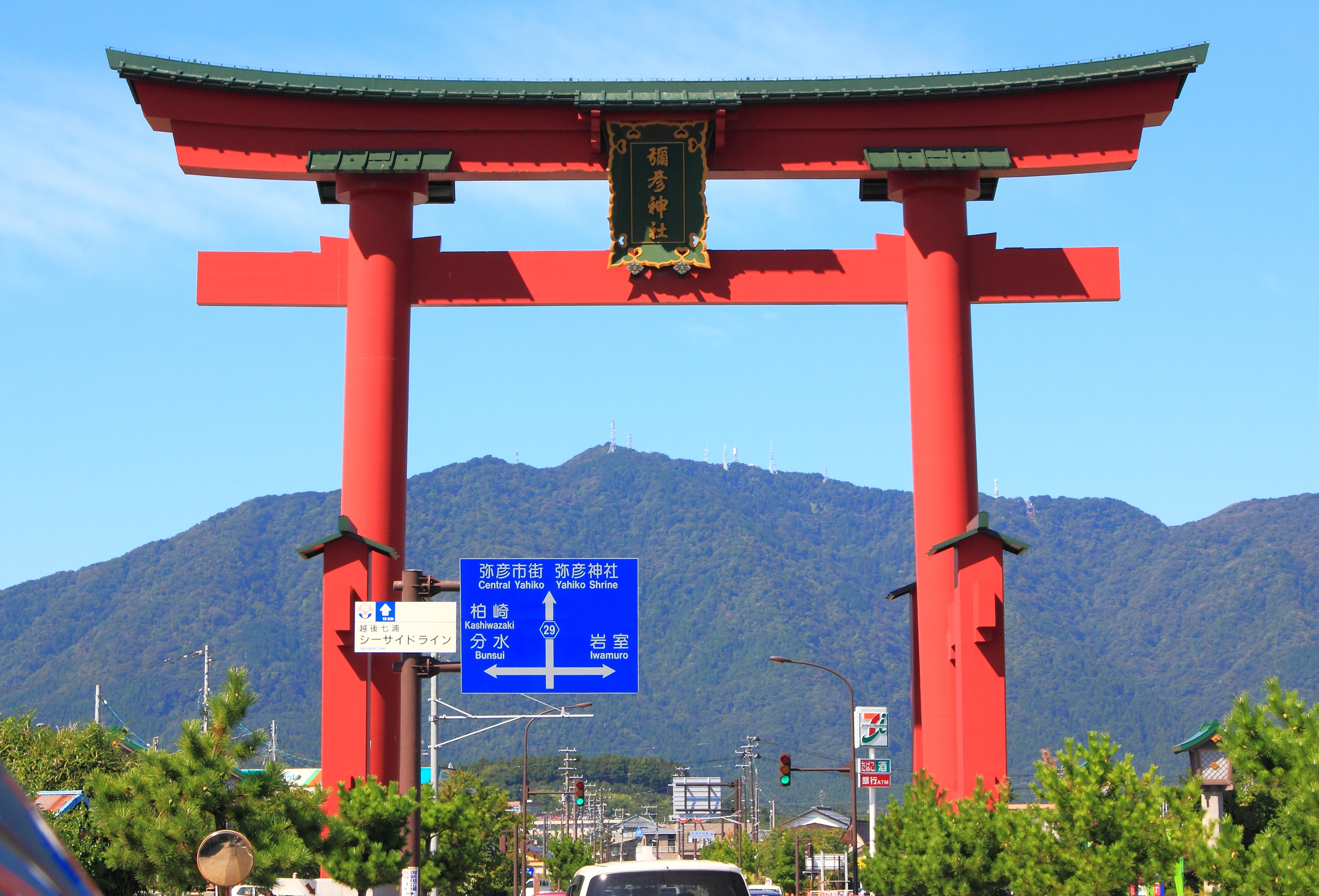
- Huge Torii gate and Mount Yahiko, built in 1981

- Flag Seal

- Location of Yahiko in Niigata Prefecture

- Coordinates: 37°41′28″N 138°51′19″E
- Country: Japan
- Region: Chūbu (Kōshin'etsu) (Hokuriku)
- Prefecture: Niigata
- District: Nishikanbara

Area
  - Total: 25.17 km^{2} (9.72 sq mi)

Population (July 1, 2019)
  - Total: 7,824
  - Density: 310.8/km^{2} (805.1/sq mi)
- Time zone: UTC+9 (Japan Standard Time)
- Symbols
  - Tree: Castanopsis
- Phone number: 0256-94-3131
- Address: 402 Yahagi, Yahiko-mura, Nishikambara-gun, Niigata-ken 959-0392
- Website: Official website

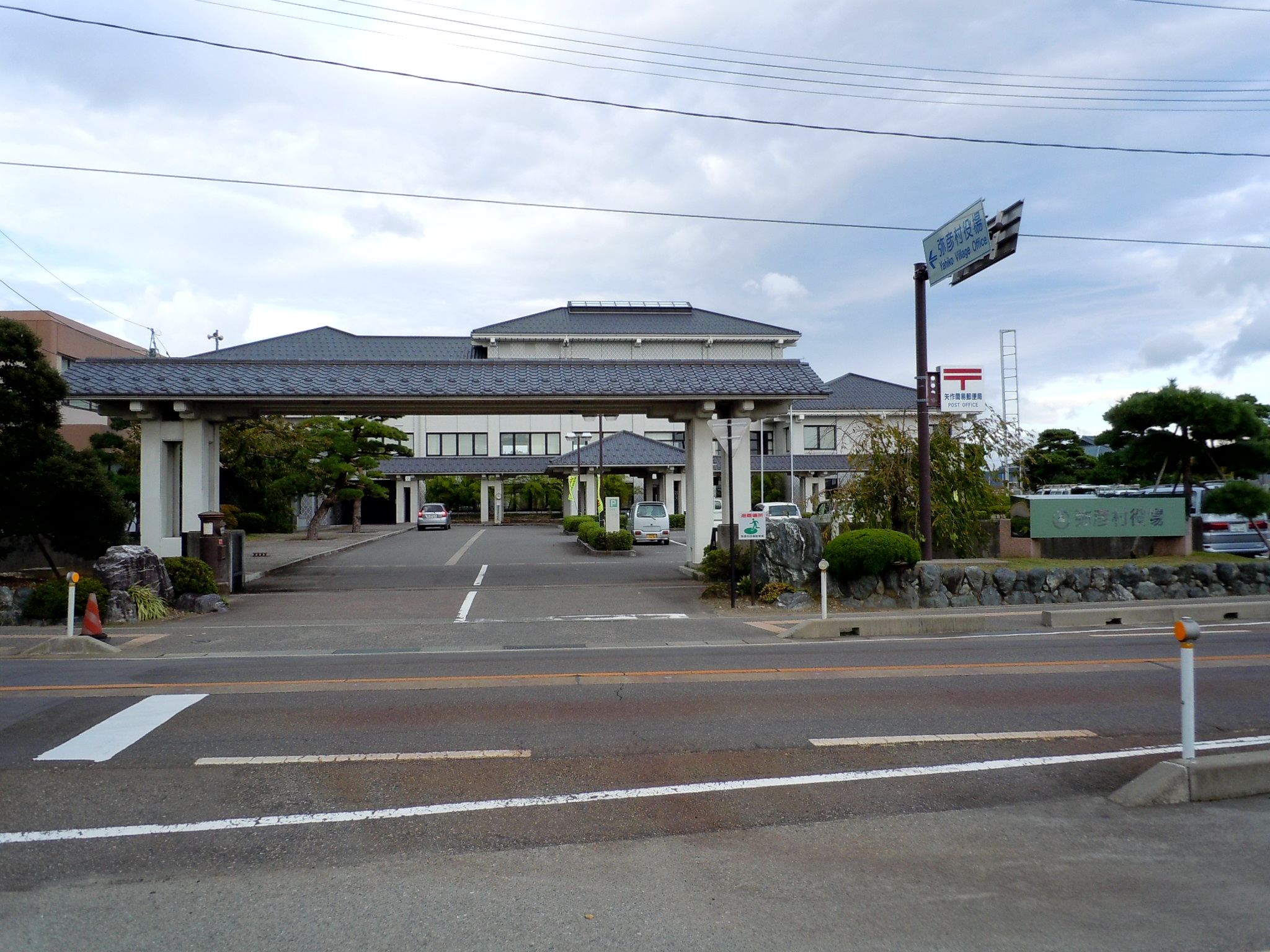
Yahiko village hall

Yahiko (弥彦村, Yahiko-mura) is a village located in Niigata Prefecture, Japan. As of 1 July 2019, the village had an estimated population of 7,824, and a population density of 311 persons per km^{2}. The total area of the village was 25.17 square kilometres (9.72 sq mi).

== Geography ==
Yahiko is located in a coastal region of central Niigata Prefecture, but is not on the coast. Yahiko lies on the south side of Mount Yahiko. This mountain and nearby Mount Kakuda, stand alone on the Sea of Japan coast not far from Niigata City. Yahiko has one of the oldest family owned hotels in Niigata prefecture called Yamamotokan.

=== Surrounding municipalities ===
- Niigata Prefecture
  - Nagaoka
  - Niigata
  - Tsubame

== Climate ==
Yahiko has a humid subtropical climate (Köppen Cfa) characterized by warm, wet summers and cold winters with heavy snowfall. The average annual temperature in Yahiko is 13.0 °C. The average annual rainfall is 2081 mm with September as the wettest month. The temperatures are highest on average in August, at around 26.1 °C, and lowest in January, at around 1.3 °C.

== Demographics ==
Per Japanese census data, the population of Yahiko has remained relatively steady over the past 50 years.

Historical population
Year	Pop.	±%
1970	7,398	—
1980	7,910	+6.9%
1990	8,171	+3.3%
2000	8,535	+4.5%
2010	8,582	+0.6%
2020	7,705	−10.2%

== History ==
The area of present-day Yahiko was part of ancient Echigo Province, and developed as a settlement around Yahiko-jinja, a Shinto shrine which was established in the 8th century. The modern village was established within Nishikanbara District, Niigata on April 1, 1889 with the creation of the municipalities system. The present shrine was rebuilt in 1916. The earlier shrine buildings were destroyed by a 1912 fire which started in the village. It is the only village left in its district after the two towns from the same district merged into the city of Tsubame on March 20, 2006.

== Education ==
Yahiko has one public elementary school and one public middle school operated by the village government, but no public high school.

== Transportation ==
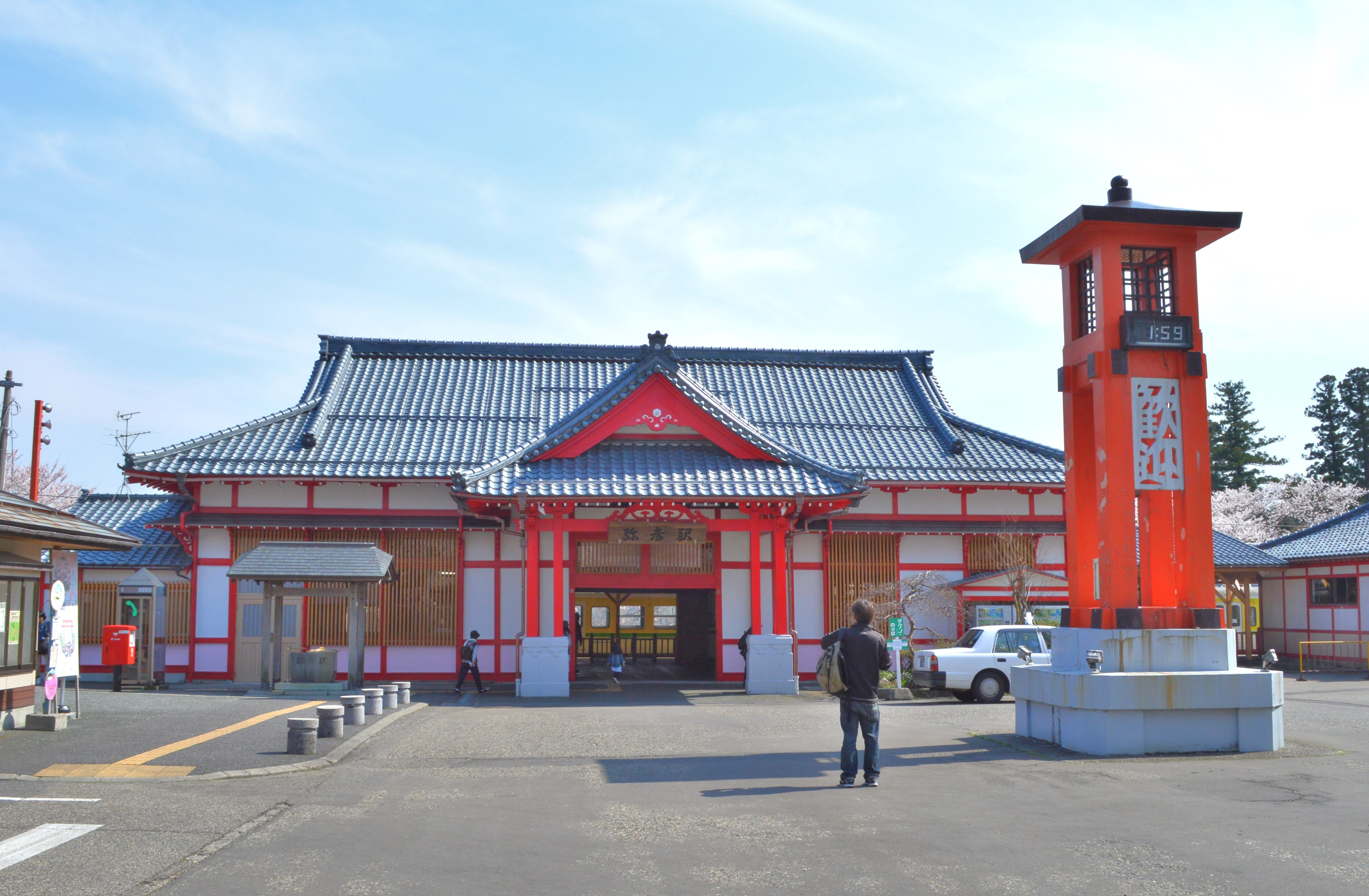
Yahiko Station

=== Railway ===
JR East - Yahiko Line

- Yahiko - Yahagi

=== Ropeway ===
- Yahikoyama Ropeway

=== Highway ===
- Yahiko is not on any national expressway or highway

== Sightseeing ==
=== Places ===
- Yahiko Shrine
- Yahiko Onsen (hot spring)
- Yahiko Velodrome
- Yahikoyama Ropeway and Skyline

=== Events ===
- Chrysanthemum Festival (in November)
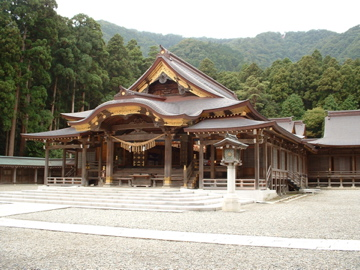
Yahiko Shrine beneath Yahiko Mountain

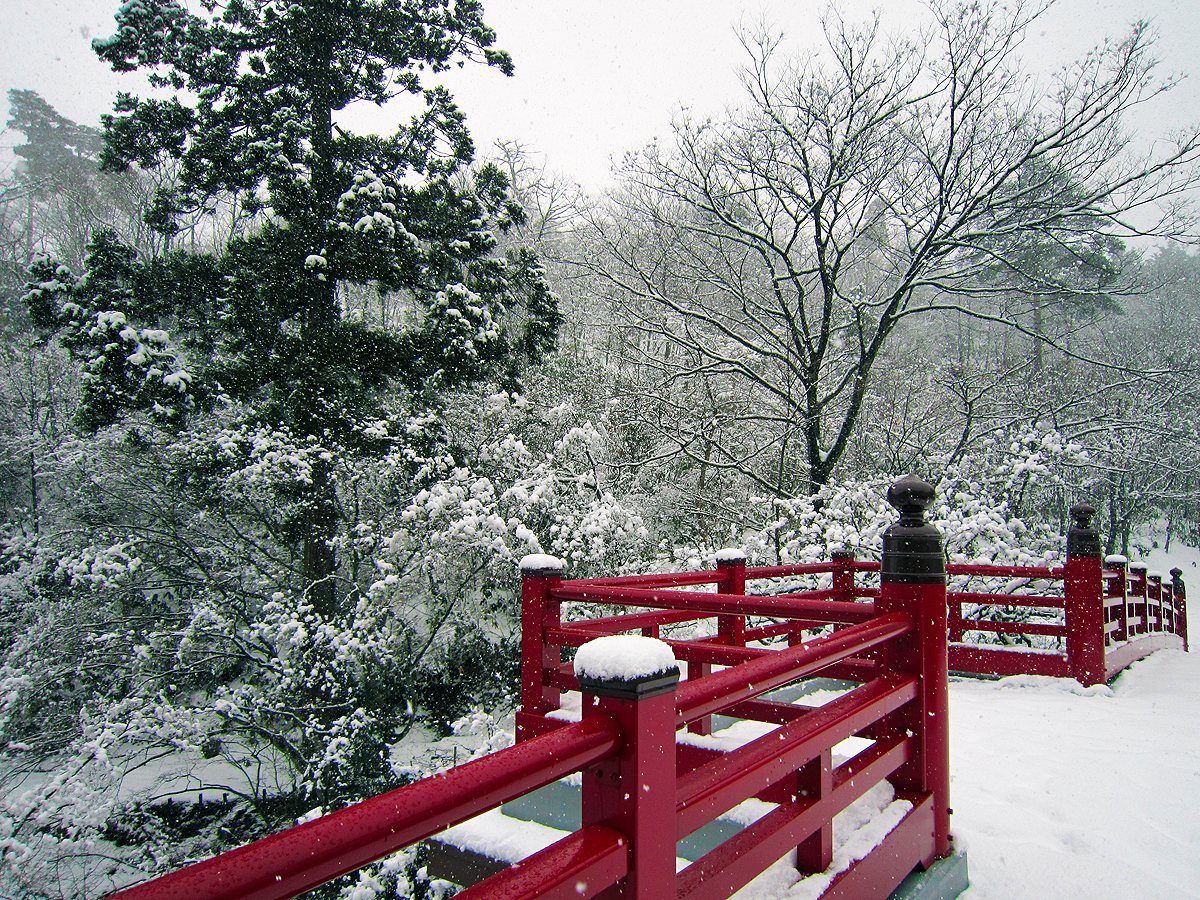
Yahiko Park in winter

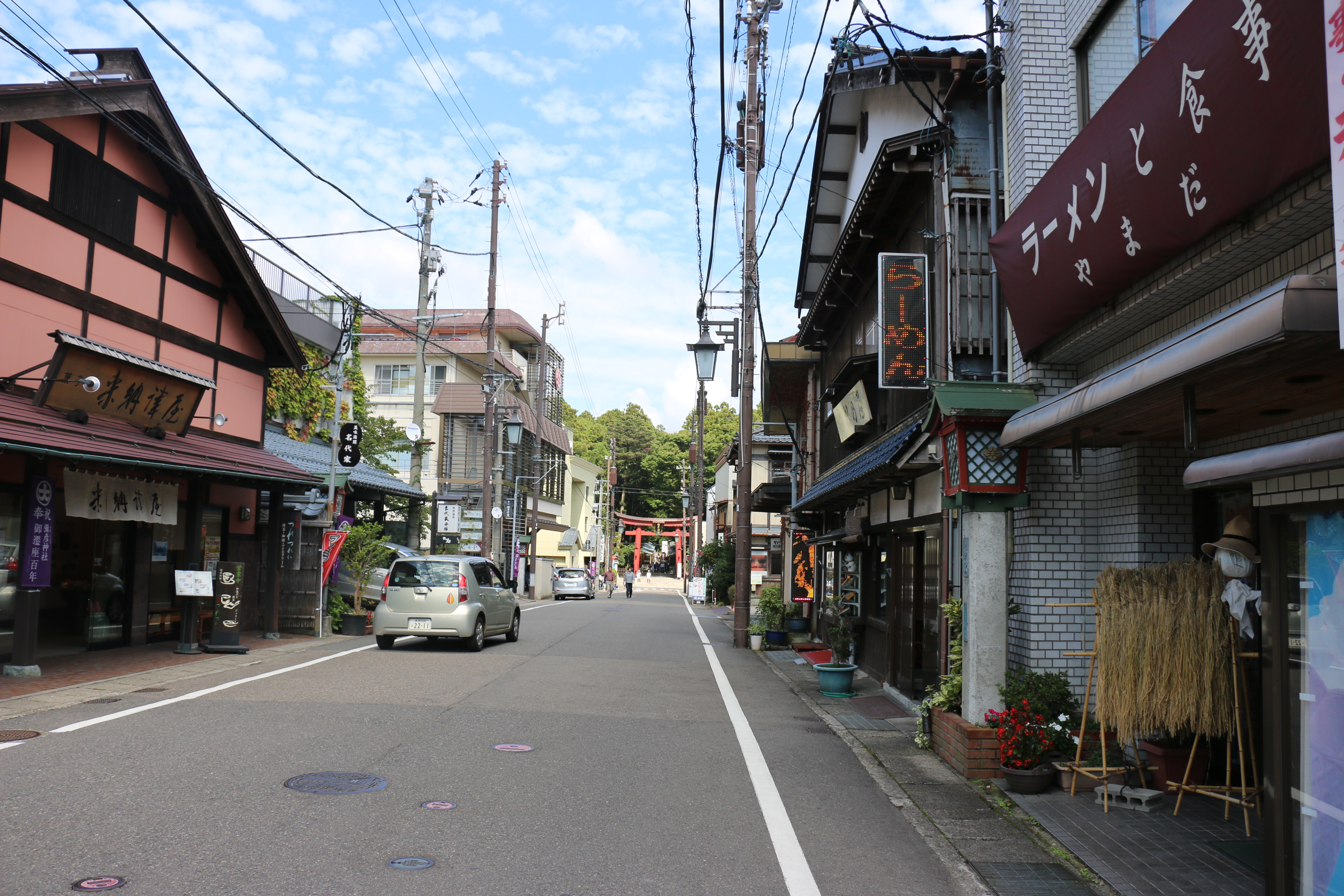
Jinja-dori Street
