= German trawler V 311 Osdorf =

History
- Name: Rendsburg (1921–39); Osdorf (1939–51); Vestland (1951–52); Sirabuen (1952–56)
- Owner: N. Ebeling (1921–39); Andersen & Co. (1939–41); Kriegsmarine (1941–45); Andersen & Co. (1945–51); Trygve Klonvig (1951–56)
- Port of registry: (Weimar Republic) Altona, Germany (1921–32); (Weimar Republic) Bremerhaven, Germany (1932–33); (Nazi Germany) Bremerhaven, Germany (1933-41); Kriegsmarine (1941–45); Bremerhaven, Allied-occupied Germany (1945–49); Bremerhaven, West Germany (1949-51); Haugesund, Norway (1951-56)
- Builder: H. C. Stülcken Sohn
- Yard number: 523
- Launched: 1 September 1921
- Completed: 11 November 1921
- Commissioned: 20 April 1941
- Decommissioned: May 1945
- Out of service: 10 January 1956
- Identification: Code Letters LDFS (1921-34); .; Fishing boat registration SD 112 (1921–32); Fishing boat registration BX 220 (1932–39); Code Letters DQPP (1934–51); Fishing boat registration HH 259 (1939–41); Pennant Number V 311 (1941–45); Fishing boat registration HH 259 (1945–51); Code Letters LAIG (1951–56)
- Fate: Sank after collision

General characteristics
- Type: Fishing trawler (1921–41, 1945-51); Vorpostenboot (1941–45); Coaster (1951–56)
- Tonnage: 250 GRT, 99 NRT (1921–51); 288 GRT, 125 NRT (1951–56)
- Length: 41.95 m (137 ft 8 in)
- Beam: 7.37 m (24 ft 2 in)
- Draught: 2.87 m (9 ft 5 in)
- Depth: 3.98 m (13 ft 1 in)
- Installed power: Triple expansion steam engine, 58nhp (1921–51); Diesel Engine (1951–56)
- Propulsion: Single screw propeller
- Speed: 10 knots (19 km/h) (1921–51)

Osdorf was a German fishing trawler that was built in 1921 as Rendsburg. Renamed in 1939, she was requisitioned by the Kriegsmarine in the Second World War for use as a Vorpostenboot, serving as V 311 Osdorf. Restored to her ownes post-war, she was sold to Norway in 1951 and converted to a cargo ship, renamed Vestland. She was renamed Sirabuen in 1952, serving until 1956 when she was lost in a collision.

== Description ==
As built, the ship 41.95 metres (137 ft 8 in) long, with a beam of 7.37 metres (24 ft 2 in). She had a depth of 3.98 metres (13 ft 1 in) and a draught of 2.87 metres (9 ft 5 in). She was assessed at 250 GRT, 99 NRT. She was powered by a triple expansion steam engine, which had cylinders of 32 centimetres (12 5/8 in), 53.8 centimetres (21 3/16 in) and 86 centimetres (33 7/8 in) diameter by 75 centimetres (29 1/2 in) stroke. The engine was built by H. C. Stülcken Sohn, Hamburg, Germany. It was rated at 58nhp. It drove a single screw propeller, and could propel the ship at 10 knots (19 km/h).

== History ==
Rendsburg was built as yard number 523 by H. C. Stülcken Sohn, Hamburg for N. Ebeling, Altona, Germany. She was launched on 1 September 1921 and completed on 11 November. The fishing boat registration SD 112 was allocated, as were the Code Letters LDFS. On 9 March 1932, her registration was changed to BX 220, and her port of registry was changed to Bremerhaven. In 1934, her Code Letters were changed to DQPP,

On 17 October 1939, she was sold to Andersen & Co, Hamburg and was renamed Osdorf. The registration HH 259 was allocated. She participated in Operation Weserübung in 1940. On 20 April 1941, Osdorf was requisitioned by the Kriegsmarine for use as a vorpostenboot. She was allocated to 3 Vorpostenflotille as V 311 Osdorf. She was returned to her owners post-war.

On 4 July 1951, she was sold to Trygve Klonvig, Haugesund, Norway. Re-engined with a diesel engine, she was renamed Vestland. The engine was a 4-stroke single cycle single action diesel engine, It had eight cylinders of 12 inches (30 cm) diameter by 15 inches (38 cm) stroke. The engine was built by the National Supply Co., Springfield, Ohio, United. States. She was now assessed at 288 GRT, 125 NRT. Her port of registry was Haugesund and the Code Letters LAIG were allocated. In 1952, she was renamed Sirabuen. On 10 January 1956, she collided with the Brazilian steamship Loide Venezuela 15 nautical miles (28 km) off Kijkduin, South Holland, Netherlands and sank with the loss of seven of her eight crew. Her captain was rescued by Loide Venezuela.

== Sources ==
- Gröner, Erich (1993). Die deutschen Kriegsschiffe 1815-1945 (in German). Vol. 8/I: Flußfahrzeuge, Ujäger, Vorpostenboote, Hilfsminensucher, Küstenschutzverbände (Teil 1). Koblenz: Bernard & Graefe. ISBN 3-7637-4807-5.
