= Yahiko Shrine =

Shinto shrines in Niigata Prefecture, Japan

- 弥彦神社
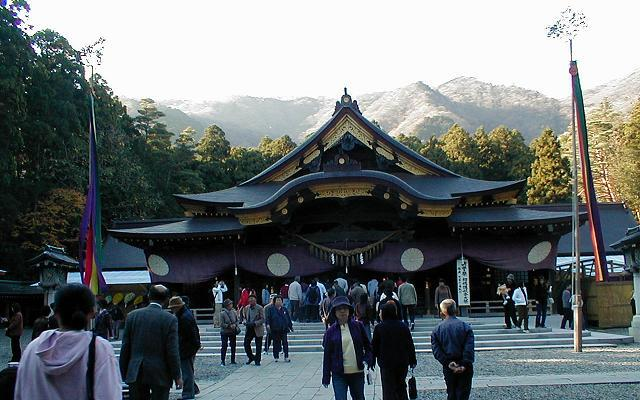
- Haiden of Yahiko Jinja

- Yahiko Jinja Yahiko Shrine (Japan)

Religion
- Affiliation: Shinto
- Deity: Ame-no-Kaguyama-no-Mikoto
- Festival: February 2
- Type: Ichinomiya

Location
- Location: Yahiko, Niigata, Japan
- Interactive map of Yahiko Shrine
- Coordinates: 37°42′23.7″N 138°49′33.9″E

Website
- Official website

Yahiko jinja (弥彦神社), also known as Iyahiko-jinja, is a Shinto shrine in the Yahiko neighborhood of the village of Yahiko, Nishikanbara District, Niigata Prefecture, Japan. It is one of the three shrines which claim the title of ichinomiya of former Echigo Province. The shrine's annual festival is held on February 2. This shrine standing at the foot of a mountain is popularly and traditionally known as a power spot for love and good fortune.

The shrine is located within Sado-Yahiko-Yoneyama Quasi-National Park and is on the eastern base of Mount Yahiko, a 634-meter sacred mountain which forms the shintai of the shrine.

== Enshrined kami ==
The kami enshrined at Yahiko Jinja is:

- Ame-no-Kaguyama-no-mikoto (天香山命)

== History ==
The foundation date of Yahiko Shrine is unknown, but the shrine dates to prehistoric times as it is referred to as "ancient" in a poem even in the Nara period Man'yōshū. Per the shrine's legend, Ame-no-Kaguyama-no-mikoto landed from the heavens at Nozumihama (in what is now the city of Nagaoka) and taught local people about industries such as fishing, salt production, rice cultivation, and sericulture. He was later enshrined on Mount Yahiko as the kami who founded Echigo. He also was recorded in the Kojiki as having performed a bugaku dance at the coronation of Emperor Jimmu. Ame-no-Kaguyama-no-mikoto is also claimed to be the ancestor of the Owari Kuni no miyatsuko and it is more than likely that the shrine legend and tradition confuses this kami with Prince Ohiko (大彦命), the ancestor of the Hokuriku Kuni no miyatsuko.

The shrine is mentioned in and entry for 833 AD in Shoku Nihon Kōki and per the same source, the shrine was awarded the rank of Junior 5th Rank, Lower Grade (従五位下) in 842 AD. Per the Nihon Sandai Jitsuroku, it was promoted to Junior 4th Rank, Lower Grade in 861 AD and its name appears in the Engishiki records compiled in 927 AD. The subsequent history of the shrine is uncertain and often contradictory, as most old records have been lost in fires and other disasters over the years. The shrine was well patronised by the military samurai class, and the shrine treasury has a Muromachi period Ōdachi Japanese sword which is an Important Cultural Property of Japan as well as amor and swords donated by Minamoto no Yoriie, Minamoto no Yoshitsune and Uesugi Kenshin.

During the Edo period, the daimyō of Takada Domain, Matsudaira Tadateru granted the shrine estates with a kokudaka of 500 koku for its upkeep/ During the Edo Period, the kokugaku scholar Hirata Atsutane claimed that the shrine had preserved in Jindai moji, predating the introduction of Chinese-based kanji, but that these records had been lost in a fire.

After the Meiji restoration and the establishment of State Shinto, the shrine was designated a National shrine, 2nd rank (国幣中社, kokuhei-chūsha) under the Modern system of ranked Shinto Shrines in 1871. The present shrine structures were rebuilt in 1916. The earlier shrine buildings were destroyed by a 1912 fire which started in the village.

The shrine is located a 15-minute walk from Yahiko Station on the JR East Yahiko Line.

== Gallery ==
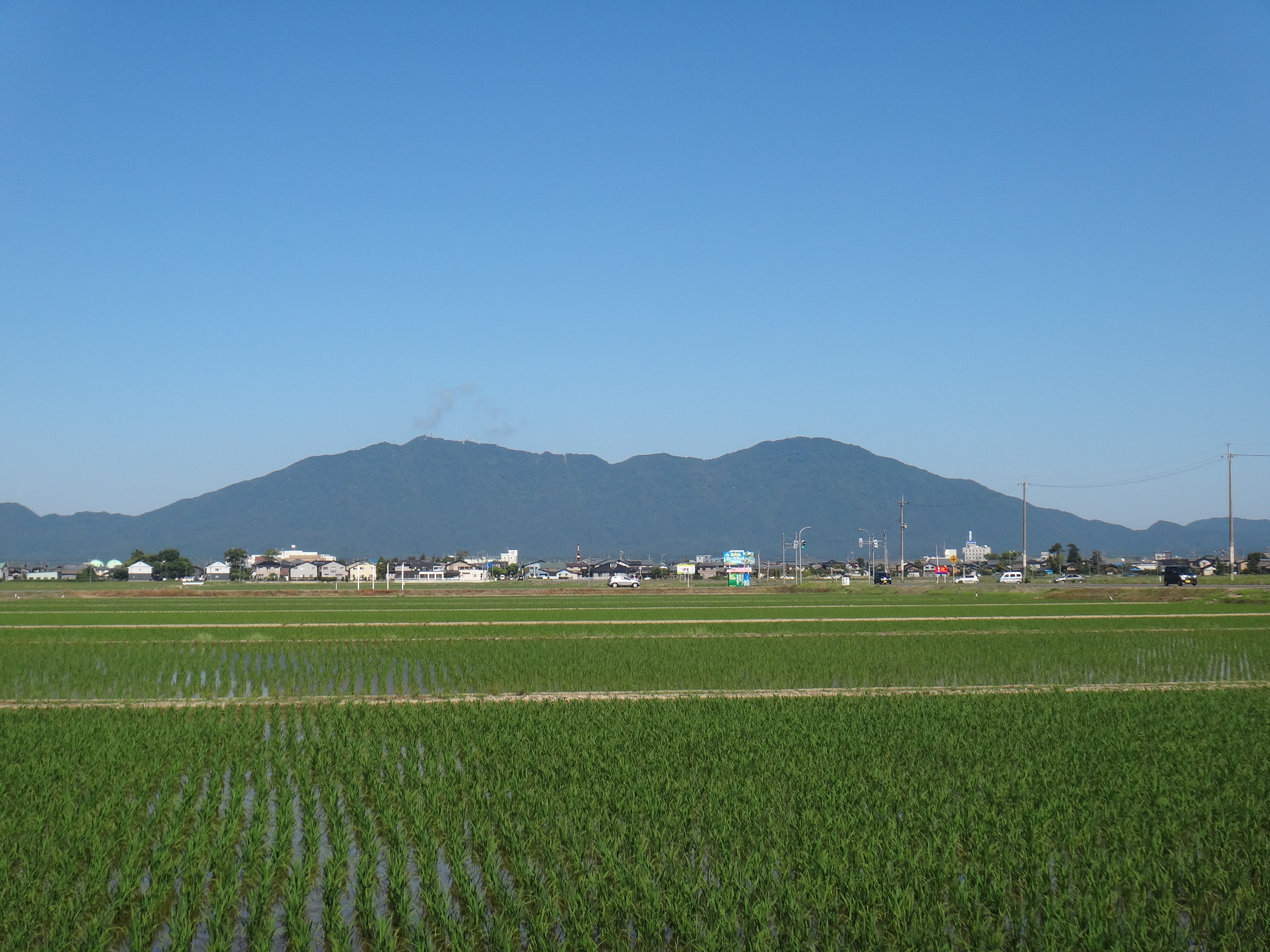
Mount Yahiko

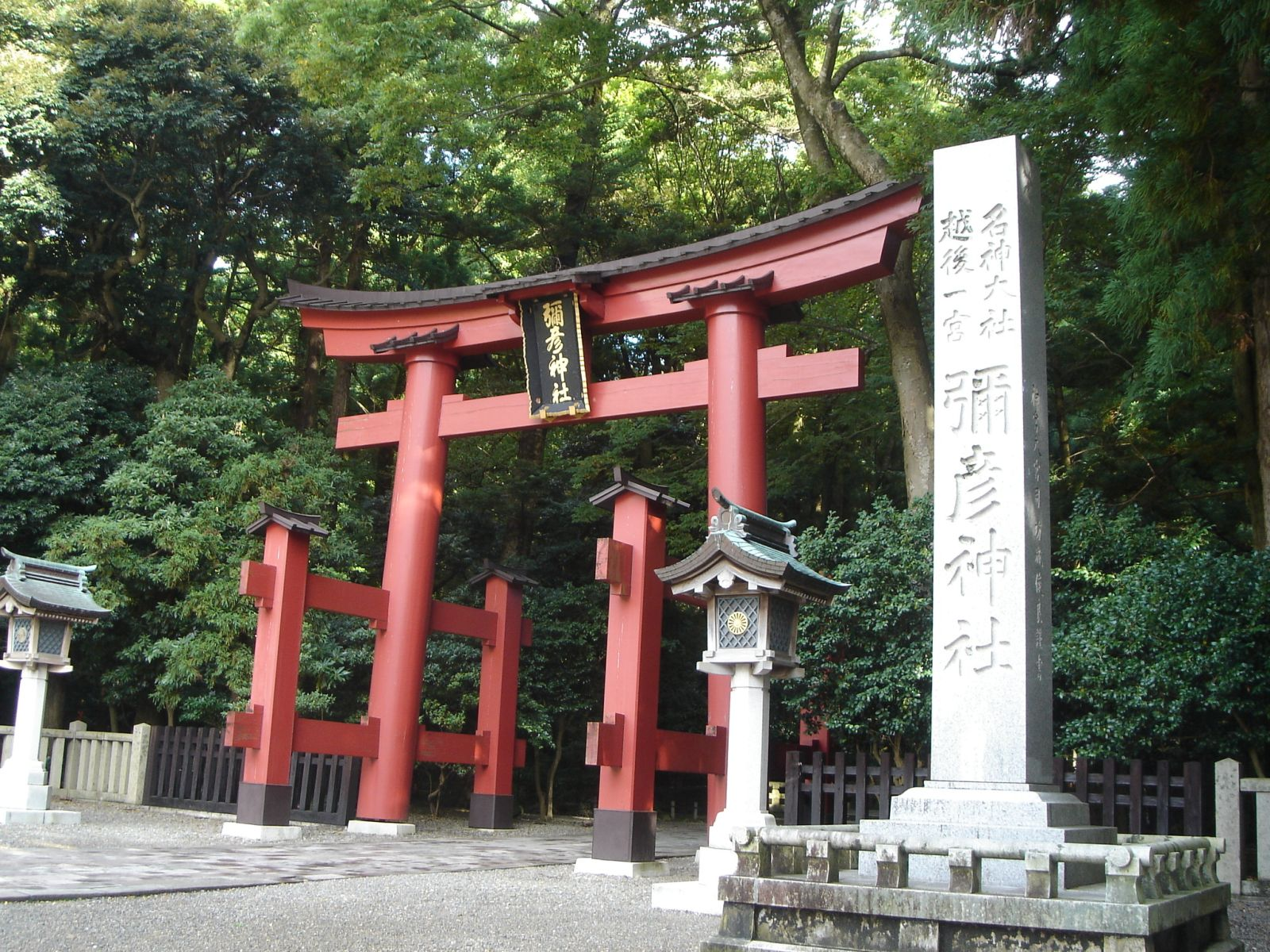
Torii

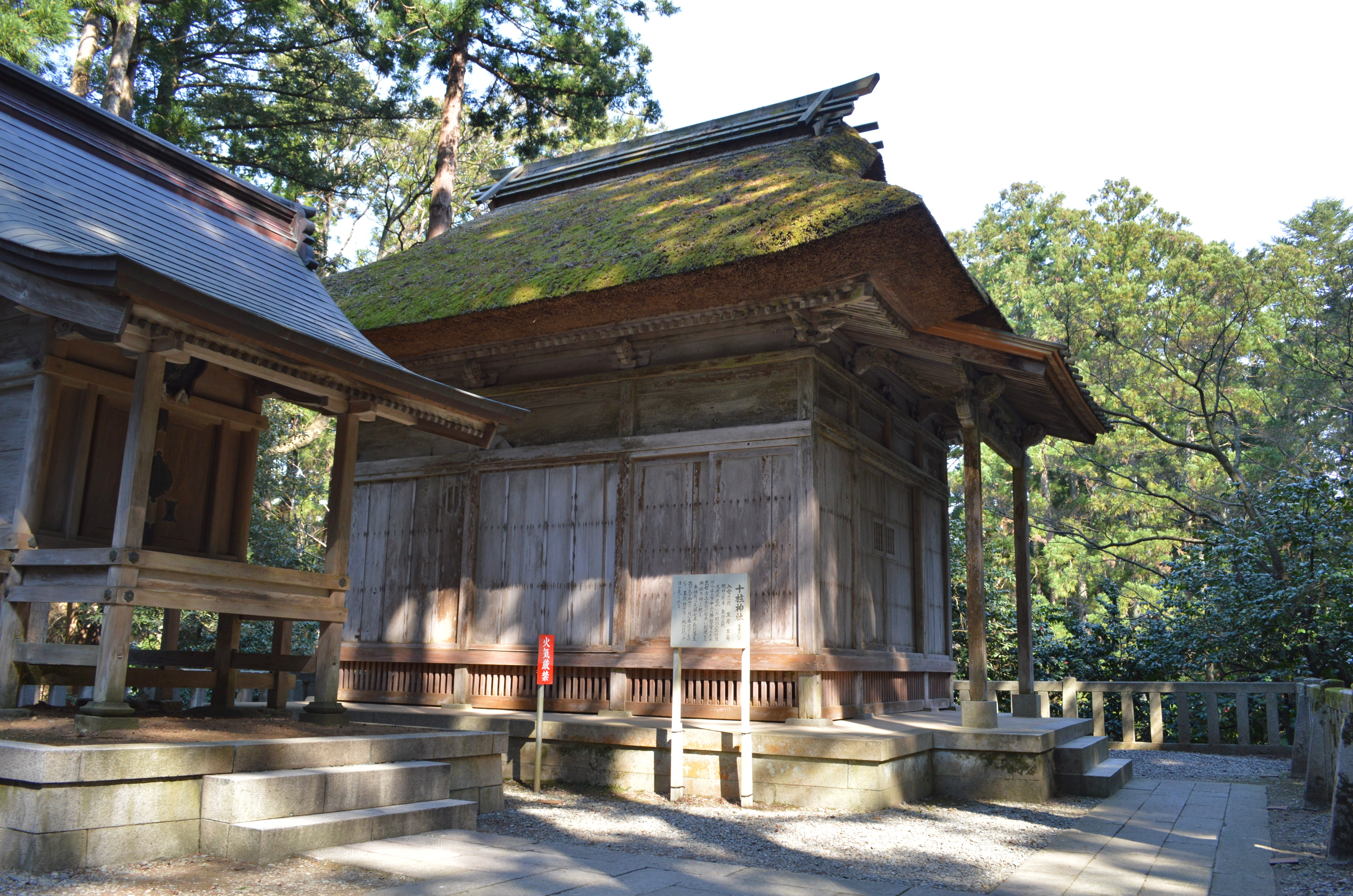
Tobashira Jinja Shaden

== Cultural Properties ==
=== National Important Cultural Properties ===
- Tobashira Jinja Shaden (十柱神社社殿), Edo Period, (1694). This is a sub-shrine located within the precincts of the Yahiko Jinja with a thatched nagare-zukuri roof. It was designated as a National Important Cultural Property in 1917.
- Ōdachi (大太刀), Muromachi period, (1415); blade length of 220.4 cm.
- Tetsu Bussho-bachi (鉄仏餉鉢), Kamakura period, (1326);

=== National Intangible Cultural Folk Properties ===
- Yahiko Jinja Lantern Pushing and Bugaku Dance (弥彦神社燈篭おしと舞楽).

At Yahiko Shrine, the lantern ritual is held annually on July 25. That evening, large and small lanterns donated by parishioners and others are assembled around the mikoshi (portable shrine). The large lanterns are made by assembling square poles about 3 cm thick into a lattice pattern measuring approximately 1 meter wide, 2.5 meters long, and 60 cm high. The top and four sides are covered with paper, and the lanterns are decorated with large, colorful artificial flowers representing the seasons, including cherry blossoms, peonies, chrysanthemums, irises, and maple leaves, and are topped with lanterns. The small lanterns are square lanterns about 45 cm long, 30 cm wide, and 60 cm high, attached to bamboo poles about 3 meters long, and are donated by individuals. In addition to those used in the procession, the temple grounds are overflowing with lanterns. After the procession, the large lantern is returned and installed flush with the railing of the temporary dance hall in front of the shrine. Bugaku is a general term for various types of kagura are performed by young boys surrounded by lanterns in a special temporary dance hall in front of the shrine during the lantern ritual.

=== National Registered Tangible Cultural Properties ===
A total of 20 structures at Yahiko Shrine (all of which date from 1916), are Registered Tangible Cultural Properties. These include the following:

- Honden (本殿l)
- Heiden (幣殿)
- Haiden (拝殿)
- Stone Corridor (石廊下)
- Auspicious Fence/Rear Gate (瑞垣・裏門)
- Divine Offering Place (神饌所)
- Waiting Hall (伺候所)
- Norito Hall (祝詞舎)
- First Torii (一之鳥居)
- Seisatsu-dai (制札台)
- Stone Bridge (石橋)
- Ema Hall (絵馬殿)
- Chōzuya (手水舎)
- Divine Talisman Granting Hall (神符授与所)
- Second Torii (二之鳥居)
- Sacred Tree and Stone Fence (神木石柵)
- Drum Tower (鼓楼)
- Mai-den (舞殿)
- Rakusha Pavilion (楽舎)
- Sanshuden (Assembly Hall) (Former Viewing Hall) (参集殿（旧拝観所）)
- Saikan (Former Imperial Envoy Pavilion) (斎館（旧勅使館）)
- Komainu (狛犬)
- Sessha Otogo Jinja (摂社乙子神社)
- Sessha Imayama Jinja (摂社今山神社)
- Sessha Kusanagi Jinja (摂社草薙神社)

=== Niigata Prefecture Designated Tangible Cultural Properties ===
- Kinuta celadon incense burner (砧青磁袴腰大香炉), South Song Dynasty;
- Odachi Sword (大太刀 拵共), late Edo Period;
- Saddle with stirrups (鏡鞍（附 壺鐙）), Kamakura Period;
- Calligraphy-Uesugi Tertora's prayer (上杉輝虎祈願文), Muromachi Period;

== See also ==
- List of Shinto shrines in Japan
- Ichinomiya
