= 2024 Filton Elbit Systems break-in =

Protest against defence contractor in UK

The 2024 Filton Elbit Systems break-in was a high-profile direct action carried out by members of the pro-Palestinian group Palestine Action on 6 August 2024 at the Elbit Systems UK facility at the Aztec West Business Park in Filton, near Bristol, England. The site was a research, development and manufacturing hub for Elbit, an Israeli weapons company.

The activists drove a repurposed prison van into the compound, breached security fences, entered the facility and caused damage to property and equipment; the action also involved confrontations with security personnel and police.

The break-in sparked national debate about protest tactics, the use of anti-terror laws, and the role of arms manufacturing in British domestic and foreign policy. The legal process was marked by several notable features including an attempt to convict a defence barrister of contempt of court, the absence of identified witnesses from Elbit, the defendants being forbidden from mentioning the Gaza Genocide, and the application of a "terrorism connection" to the charges which was kept secret from the jury and the public.

Six activists were arrested and later charged with aggravated burglary, criminal damage, and violent disorder. One defendant was additionally charged with grievous bodily harm (GBH), for striking a police officer with a sledgehammer, which the prosecution alleged was intentional. Two trials followed, during which the accused spent lengthy periods on remand. The first trial ended with all defendants found not guilty of aggravated burglary and the violent disorder charges were dropped. However a retrial led to four convictions for criminal damage, an acquittal on the initial GBH with intent charge and conviction on majority verdict for a lesser charge of GBH without intent.

The charges were secretly subject to a "terrorism enhancement" applied by the judge in a preliminary ruling of March 2025, but not disclosed to the jury and restricted from being reported by the UK media until May 2026, meaning the jury had returned convictions without knowing that the defendants faced significantly more severe sentencing and registration as "terrorists", which will severely restrict their future lives after release.

According to the presiding judge, Justice Jeremy Johnson, this was applied based on the "appearance" of a terrorism connection, as the property damage was caused with the intent "to influence the Israeli government by restricting their access to weapons," and their actions were "for the purpose of advancing a political or ideological cause".

On 12 June 2026, the four activists were sentenced as terrorists, with their sentences ranging from 4 to 8 years. This ruling is the first time in British legal history that protestors convicted of property damage have faced a terrorism designation upon sentencing.

== Background ==
Palestine Action is an activist network that targets firms associated with the Israeli military, especially companies it says supply weapons used against Palestinians. Prior to August 2024, the group had undertaken smaller-scale protests, blockades, and occupations at Elbit-linked sites. Their strategy emphasises direct action, including sabotage, to disrupt what they view as a "war-machine infrastructure."

Elbit's Filton facility, which is often referred to in reporting as the Horizon site, was opened in July 2023. Elbit had held a separate lease in the Aztec West business park since 2019 for other UK operations, but the specific Horizon/H2 Filton facility that Palestine Action targeted was inaugurated in July 2023.

The facility had been under repeated protest pressure. According to activist supporters, the site manufactured quadcopter drones, among other systems, which they claim are used by the Israeli military in Gaza. The Filton site's existence and operation attracted sustained opposition from Palestine Action.

== Break-in ==
In the early hours of 6 August 2024, a group of Palestine Action activists drove a decommissioned prison van into the perimeter fence of the Elbit Systems site in Filton, using the vehicle effectively as a battering ram to breach the outer security barrier.

After breaking through, the activists entered the facility. Inside, they used tools including sledgehammers, crowbars and fire extinguishers filled with red paint to vandalise equipment, walls, and floors. According to the prosecution at their later trial, they damaged drones, technical systems and other sensitive materials, and sprayed red paint to symbolise "blood." The extent of the damage caused by the activists, and to what materials, was unclear during the trial. In the week before sentencing, a report was submitted by an independent forensic analyst based on Elbit's insurance claim. This listed damage to military assets including the "Magni-X" drone and multiple "Thor" drones in the "Legion-X" and "HELIOS" configurations.

During the break-in, there was a confrontation between the activists and responding security staff and police. Samuel Corner fractured police officer Kate Evans' spine with a sledgehammer. Body camera footage, revealed to the defence only partway through the first trial, showed one security guard, Angelo Volante, entering the site wielding a whip and later moving towards someone while holding a sledgehammer.

During the trial, it was revealed that the map of factory CCTV cameras given to the defence team was incomplete and lacked coverage of several areas, including those where disputed incidents took place. After the raid, Elbit had sole control and access to the CCTV system for two days following, according to PC Sarah Grant under cross-examination. Communication between that officer and a senior Elbit employee granted anonymity ("Witness Alpha") included her observation that "There's a huge opportunity for the defence counsel to use the gaps and jumps to their advantage", which was criticised by the defence barrister as appearing to show that police were "chatting with Israel's largest arms manufacturer about what the defence counsel might do".

Six people were arrested at the site that day, while additional arrests followed in nationwide raids in the days and months afterward. The total number of activists charged in relation to the break-in eventually reached 24, a group widely referred to as the "Filton 24".

In September 2025 Elbit Systems UK announced the closure of the Aztec West site following this raid and similar ones carried out both before and afterwards.

== Legal proceedings ==
Immediately after the break-in, the arrested suspects were detained under the UK Terrorism Act, allowing extended detention without charge. However, the formal charges later brought by the Crown Prosecution Service (CPS) were not terrorism offences; instead they included aggravated burglary, criminal damage, and violent disorder. Nevertheless, the CPS indicated it would argue the offences had a "terrorist connection," which could be treated as an aggravating factor at sentencing. The judge did indeed rule in March 2025 that the defendants would be charged with that terrorism enhancement, though this information was kept secret from the jury and from the wider public until after some convictions were returned in May 2026. For the charge of aggravated burglary to be successful, the prosecution needed to prove the defendants entered the weapons factory with the intent to injure the people inside.

=== First 6 defendants, first trial (November 2025 - February 2026) ===
The first major trial involving a subset of six activists - those accused of entering the factory - was scheduled for November 2025 at Woolwich Crown Court. By the time of the trial, some of the defendants had been held on remand for over a year, exceeding the usual six-month limit for being detained pre-trial without bail. The defendants denied all charges against them. The defence lawyers sought to halt proceedings for alleged abuse of processes making a fair trial impossible, claiming then-Home Secretary Yvette Cooper had been in contempt of court for authoring an article, published that August in The Observer, "which directly interferes with the court process". The article, which said the charges against the defendants included a "terrorism connection" and intimated "disturbing information" about potential "future attacks", was, according to the lawyers, "dripping in innuendo". Before publication, the CPS warned Cooper the article could unfairly impact the trial. The defence cited other statements from the government they claimed were false and would prejudice the trial. Once such statement, which the judge described as "misleading", was a report in The Times that Home Office officials said Iran could be funding Palestine Action. In a pre-trial ruling, the judge, Justice Johnson, dismissed the defence's application for abuse of process.

For the trial, the judge ruled inadmissible the defendants' defence of "lawful excuse": that they had done what they had done to prevent a greater harm - they'd destroyed weapons that would have been used to kill civilians in Gaza.

During proceedings, police released to the press edited prosecution footage from the night of 6 August 2024. The court was shown body-worn police footage, CCTV and video taken by activists' own devices including GoPros, capturing the van breach, the interior damage and the confrontations with police and security staff. The defence had to push during the trial for access to unredacted footage and correspondence between the police and Elbit staff. Some footage was missing. Newly-released footage showed Elbit security staff entering the factory with a whip, and at one stage holding a sledgehammer. The footage showed much of the violence was initiated by security staff. During examination, the police admitted Elbit had sole access to the factory CCTV footage for two days; correspondence, in the defence's words, showed the police "chatting with Israel's largest arms manufacturer about what the defence counsel might do" if the footage was edited excessively.

Police accounts changed under cross-examination by the defence. For example, in one attending officer's statement they said they saw one of the defendants holding a sledge hammer, but admitted under examination that it was one of the security staff who actually held it. There were two alleged assaults by the security guard on one of the defendants.

Summing up was expected to be completed on Friday 9 January. The trial ran for 10 weeks. On 4 February, after deliberating for over 36 hours, the jury returned a verdict of 'not guilty' for all six defendants regarding the charge of aggravated burglary. Other charges against these (criminal damage and violent disorder) resulted in no verdicts being returned. Three defendants, Rajwani, Rogers and Devlin, were found not guilty of violent disorder.

The CPS said the people tried would face retrial for the charges on which the jury were unable to reach a verdict.

All the remaining defendants of the so-called Filton 24 were acquitted of aggravated burglary on 18 February after prosecutors were unable to provide evidence to support the charge.

=== First 6 defendants, retrial (April - May 2026) ===
==== Public comment during trial ====
During the second trial, on 14 April 2026 the MP for Coventry Zarah Sultana used parliamentary privilege to raise concerns in the House of Commons regarding the amendment to the Crime and Policing Bill. She stated the following: "Madam Deputy Speaker, I am going to exercise the privilege of this House to place something on the public record that the mainstream press has chosen to ignore."

She stated, "Six Palestine Action activists face retrial after being acquitted in February following a year in prison. If convicted, they and 18 others will be sentenced as terrorists, but the jury will not be told that. The jury could convict them on criminal damage charges with no idea that terrorism sentences will follow. Not a single terrorism charge has been brought forward. The proscription has been ruled unlawful, and the defendants themselves have been banned from telling the jury that they acted to stop genocide under threat of contempt charges".

The next week it was noted that no "British media outlet can safely report or play the contents of what she said" but that in general legislative terms, changes under the Counter-Terrorism and Sentencing Act 2021 meant that "if a defendant is found guilty of the base charge – and it's also decided that the terror connection exists – [they could] receive a longer sentence, they’d be ineligible for early release, and be registered as terror offenders".

==== Prohibited defence arguments ====
For the second trial which was due to occur on 7 April 2026, the judge placed restrictions on the arguments which the defendants were permitted to raise before the jury.

On the 8 January 2026 in the first trial, Rajiv Menon KC made his closing remarks to the jury as he represented the defendants. Judge Johnson considered that his closing remarks may have contravened his previous ruling. The first trial had concluded on the 4th of February 2026 with the jury discharged as they had failed to deliver a verdict.

They were forbidden from mentioning jury equity (the absolute right of jurors to convict or acquit according to their conscience), or that a judge may not direct a jury to convict. They were also prevented from relying on 'necessity defences' including that the defendants' actions were legally justified as they acted out of necessity to save lives, acted to prevent a greater crime, or acted to prevent much greater property damage in Palestine.

Also they could not invite the jury to consider Elbit's activities in manufacturing and supplying weapons to Israel, the nature of the property destroyed in the raid on the Elbit facility, their belief that the weapons at the factory would be used to kill or injury others including children, the history of the middle east including since 7 October 2023, and their previous acquittals on charges of aggravated burglary and violent disorder. For the duration of the trial, UK media were forbidden to report on these restrictions.

Towards the end of the second trial, five of the defendants (with the exception of Corner) dismissed counsel and chose to make their closing arguments to the jury themselves. They said their lawyers were unable to represent them due to "decisions made by the court". In her closing remarks, Charlotte Head stated that she pleaded not guilty to damaging property because what was damaged "were weapons" and that she believed she "was legally justified in doing what I did". She stated she had "I signed up [for the action] after months of campaigning and pleading. I can tell you I had no other choice, no other options were available because we tried them all." Zoe Rogers stated that the targeted site held export licences to Israel and had been visited by its ambassador. "The prosecution knows full well that we are right that this factory is supplying weapons to Israel to be used in Gaza," she said, adding, "they are choosing to suppress the truth rather than contest it". She also noted that during the trial, "certain words have been blacklisted, that, until our speeches, the word 'genocide' hasn't been said once".

==== Verdict ====
On 5 May 2026 the jury returned verdicts in the retrial at Woolwich Crown Court. Four defendants: Charlotte Head, Samuel Corner, Leona Kamio and Fatema Rajwani were found guilty of criminal damage. Two other defendants: Zoe Rogers, and Jordan Devlin were found not guilty of the same charge. On a further charge of GBH with intent, the jury found Samuel Corner not guilty, however he was found guilty (by an 11-to-1 verdict) of the lesser charge of GBH without intent.

Head, Corner, Kamio and Rajwani were remanded to prison ahead of their sentencing, set for June. On conviction all defendants had already served at least 18 months in prison, apart from Corner who had served 21 months.

With the conclusion of the jury trial, numerous reporting restrictions around the case were lifted and UK media could for the first time report on the "terrorism enhancement" that would be applied to sentencing unbeknownst to the jury, and the various lines of argument and evidence that the defence had been prevented from using.

==== Move to remove judge ====
Ahead of the sentencing hearing on 12 June, a motion to remove Judge Johnson from the case was announced to be heard on 8 June. One of the bases on which the bid to remove the judge was to be argued was his attempt to prosecute the defending barrister.

The judge was also subject of a formal complaint to the Judicial Conduct Investigations Office filed on 5 June by the campaign group Defend Our Juries. The complaint, signed by more than 3,000 people including legal professionals, alleges a pattern of "biased and discriminatory conduct" on the part of Judge Johnson. This includes, "vindictiveness" in remanding three convicted defendants to custody after the retrial, despite that not being sought by the prosecution, and his treating the defendants' motivation to prevent the deaths of Palestinian civilians as an aggravating, rather than mitigating factor.

==== Application of Section 69 of the Sentencing Act 2020 ====
After the conclusion of the trial, on 12 May 2026 UK reporting restrictions covering this enhancement were lifted. It was then revealed that Judge Justice Johnson, in a preparatory ruling made in March 2025 ruled that there "appeared to be a terrorist connection" in the case because the activists were attempting to influence the Israeli government by restricting their access to weapons." He said: “On s1(1)(b) of the Terrorism Act 2000, Rajiv Menon KC and others strongly argued that influencing government was not the purpose of the action - the purpose of the action was to damage weapons and save lives. I accept that this was one motivating factor - but that does not mean that another purpose was not to damage property to be made available to the Israeli government and thereby influence the Israeli government.”

The terrorism enhancement was expected to be applied "to the charges of Charlotte Head, Samuel Corner, Leona (Ellie) Kamio and Fatema Rajwani under section 69 of the Sentencing Act 2020, despite the jury only convicting them of criminal damage and having no knowledge that a terror link could be later imposed." It is thought to be the first case in British legal history where people taking part in direct action have been sentenced as "terrorists". In response, Palestine Action founder Huda Ammori said, “The judge kept secret from the jury that the defendants would be sentenced as terrorists, presenting that they were only charged for criminal damage which the jury decided four were guilty of. Unknowingly, the jury actually likely convicted them of terrorism. This is the first case, and therefore the test case, for trying to convict activists as terrorists, using a manipulated court process. Convicting activists for one charge, then sentencing them as terrorists, is more outrageous than the proscription of Palestine Action. Everyone needs to mobilise against it.”

On 12 June 2026, before passing sentence Johnson determined that there was a terrorist connection under section 69 of the 2020 Sentencing Act, ruling that “each defendant’s offence of criminal damage involved serious damage to property, was designed to intimidate the UK government and a section of the public [Elbit employees and those of other businesses linked to Elbit] and was for the purpose of advancing a political or ideological cause.”

==== Sentencing ====
Charlotte Head, who drove the van, was handed a custodial sentence of six years less 45 days and disqualified from driving for four years. Leona Kamio was sentenced to six years less 45 days. Fatema Rajwani was sentenced to five years and eight months less 45 days. Samuel Corner was sentenced to a combined eight years and eight months for criminal damage and GBH Without Intent.

Freedom website wrote that the judge had determined that the case involved "high culpability" and "high harm", which would normally lead to sentencing guidelines of between 7 months and 4 years. The judge said that the case was so exceptional that the starting point would be 5 years, before applying aggravating and mitigating factors. Because of the finding of a terrorism connection, the defendants would serve two thirds of the sentence before being eligible for parole, as opposed to the usual 40% (to be reduced to 33% once the 2026 Sentencing Act comes into force).

Following her sentencing, Kamio shouted, "In order to hear the birds, the warplanes must be silent", referencing Palestinian poet Marwan Makhoul. A protest of several hundred people outside the court saw 107 arrests made, some for holding placards in support of Palestine Action. Several people lay in the road to attempt to block the prison van believed to be carrying the defendants; attempts were made to open the van and riot police were used to disperse the crowd.

Writing a week later in The Guardian, human rights barrister Geoffrey Robertson KC noted that the sentencing of the Filton 4 defendants as terrorists violated a basic principle of justice - namely that defendants should be sentenced for the crimes that the jury has convicted them of, not for a crime of terrorism that was never charged or put to the jury.

Human rights groups Amnesty International and Liberty UK also publicly expressed concern that the terrorism connection finding and sentencing implications represented a 'dangerous' move against the right to protest.

In September 2026, it was announced that the defendants would seek leave to appeal against the sentence and specifically the terrorist connection ruling that Judge Johnson imposed. According to solicitor Simon Natas, who is acting for the four defendants, "serious property damage", one of the criteria used to determine whether the offence has a terrorism connection, is not clearly defined and could cover a wide range of offending, making the appeal against the sentence of "fundamental constitutional importance".

=== Contempt of court proceedings against defence barrister (April 2026 - present) ===
After the conclusion of the second trial a reporting restriction was lifted. It could then be revealed in UK media that the defence barrister, Rajiv Menon KC, had been charged with contempt of court following the first trial, for ignoring the trial judge's directions in his closing speech and in particular reminding jurors of their right to acquit on conscience.

The barrister had reportedly told the jury about Bushel's Case of 1670, which established the independence of juries and is commemorated in a plaque at the Old Bailey. The trial judge in the first case filed a complaint on that trial's conclusion in February and the case proceeded at the Royal Courts of Justice for eight weeks, well attended by media but unreported before his clients' case at Woolwich was completed.

According to legal figures, the action against Rajiv Menon is unprecedented in living memory. Veteran Human rights barrister Michael Mansfield KC stated, "I'm extremely concerned about the issues that are at the centre of this initiative which has never been done before as far as I'm aware, particularly the chilling effect upon the critical concept of a fiercely independent bar, fearless in its pursuit of justice on behalf of those it represents". Paul Heron, a solicitor with the Public Interest Law Centre said, "Barristers must be free to advance their clients' cases without fear that politically contentious arguments will expose them personally to sanction." More widely he warned of the risk to fair trials that the move represents: "Courts should protect independent advocacy, not create a chilling effect around politically sensitive defences".

On 30 April 2026, the Court of Appeal (Civil Division) heard the contempt of court case against Rajiv Menon KC. On 12 May 2026 Menon's legal team won an appeal against the charges, in which they had argued that the High Court lacked jurisdiction to handle the case against him without an intervention from the attorney general. The Court of Appeal agreed, "finding that Justice Johnson wrongly initiated proceedings and should have either dealt with the issue himself at the time or referred the matter to the attorney general."

Following the judgment, Johnson referred the matter to the President of the King's Bench Division for consideration under the correct procedure. The matter was subsequently assigned to Mrs Justice Cheema-Grubb, who held that there was a prima facie case that Menon may have acted in contempt of court and that it was in the public interest for contempt proceedings to be instituted. She directed that the allegations proceed to a substantive hearing before her sitting as a judge of the Crown Court.

The hearing was originally scheduled to take place under Cheema-Grubb on 28 July 2026. However, on 24 July 2026, the High Court of England and Wales ruled that an appeal challenging the jurisdiction of the High Court to rule on contempt should be allowed to proceed, resulting in an adjournment of proceedings until such time as the appeal could be heard.

=== Second 8 defendants, first trial (June - August 2026) ===
The trial of the second set of defendants started at the Old Bailey on 22 June 2026 under Judge Patrick Field KC. The eight defendants, listed below, were charged with criminal damage and violent disorder:

- Ian Sanders
- Aleksandra Herbich
- Teuta Hoxha
- Sean Middlebrough
- Julija Brigadirova
- Hannah Davidson
- Madeleine Norman
- William Plastow

During the trial, the court heard that none of the defendants were present at the Elbit site during the action, but the prosecution alleged that they had helped to plan it, and so were charged under a "joint enterprise". In July, the jury acquitted Plastow of violent disorder due to lack of evidence.

After 37 hours of deliberations, the jury failed to reach a verdict in the case of 7 of the defendants, finding one of the defendants guilty of criminal damage.

At a separate hearing on 14 September 2026 at Manchester Crown Court, a retrial was provisionally scheduled for June 2028. Reporting restrictions were also lifted and the identity of the convicted defendant, Sean Middlebrough, was revealed.
