= Sue Parfitt =

Climate activist

The Reverend Sue Parfitt
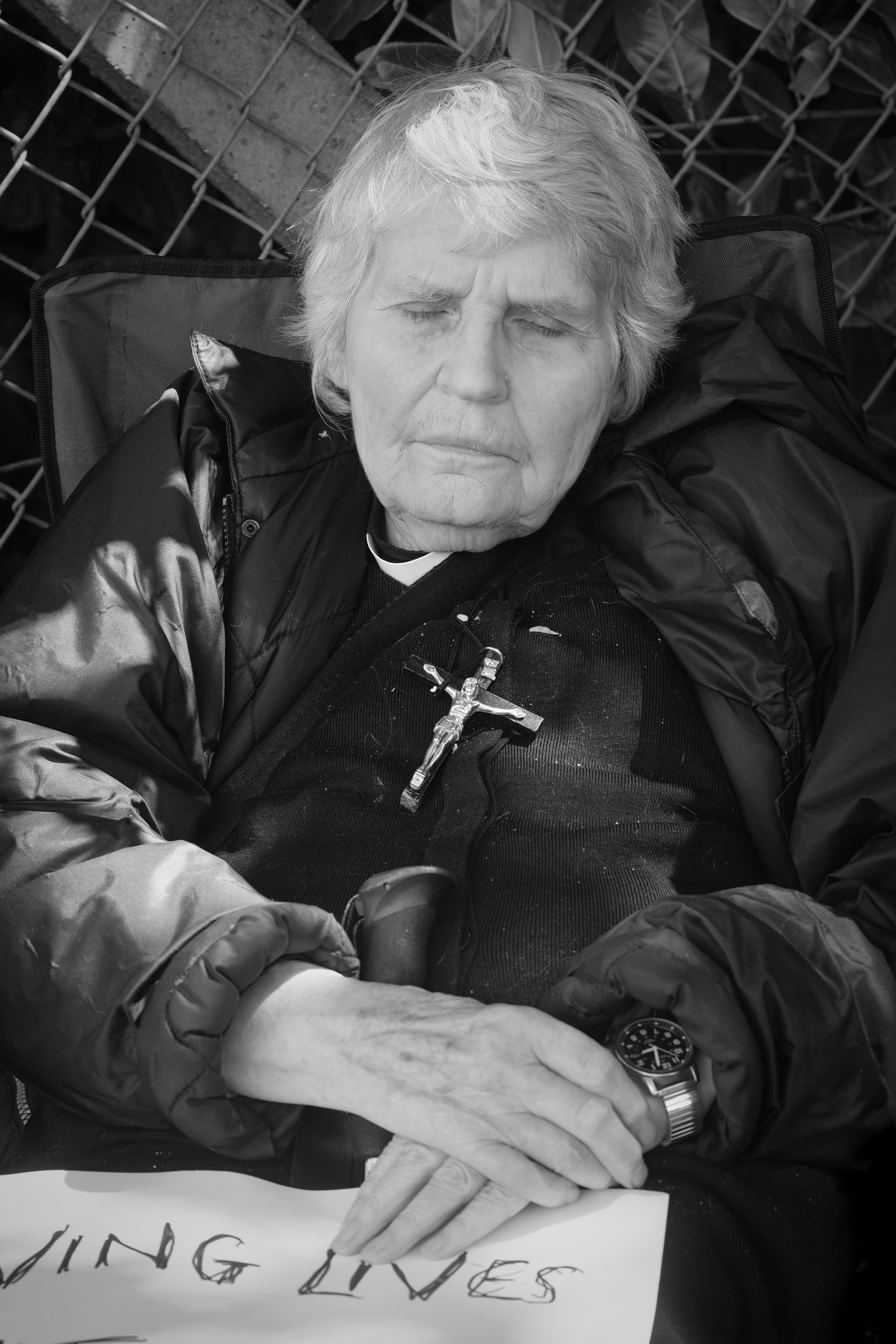
- Parfitt sleeping outside Woolwich Crown Court during the sentencing of the Filton Four on 12 June 2026
- Born: 1941 or 1942 (age 83–84)
- Education: Bristol University, Ripon College
- Occupations: retired Anglican priest, climate activist
- Organization: Christian Climate Action
- Known for: being arrested at least 24 times for activism, being one of the first women ordained as an Anglican priest

Sue Parfitt (b. 1941 or 1942) is a member of Christian Climate Action (CCA) who engages in civil disobedience to draw attention to climate change. One of the first women ordained in the Anglican church in 1994, she has since retired. For her activism, she has been arrested at least 24 times. Her actions include disrupting London rail service by sitting on top of a train and damaging the glass protecting the Magna Carta. She has also been arrested several times for expressing support for Palestine Action, a direct action group designated as a terrorist organisation by the British parliament.

== Career ==
Parfitt grew up in south Wales in a conservative Christian family. In the 1960s, she left the anti-war movement because she did not want to get arrested. After studying history at Bristol University, she became a nun in the Community of the Holy Name. Three years later, she left the convent to work as a social worker and family therapist. After completing seminary at Ripon College in the 1980s, she married an Anglican priest who lived in Bristol. In 1994, she and Vivienne Faull became some of the first women ordained as Anglican priests. In 2013, her husband died. By 2024, she had retired from the priesthood.

== Activism ==
In 2017, Parfitt became involved in Christian Climate Action (CCA). CCA is part of Extinction Rebellion, a group that engages in civil disobedience and direct action to protest climate change. For her activism, she has been arrested at least 24 times.

In April 2019, Parfitt was arrested for blocking the road in a protest in Oxford Circus. She was charged with and later found guilty of violating a police order banning protests. Parfitt stated that she would continue to protest. Later in 2019, she and another priest sat on top of a Docklands Light Railway train in Shadwell for a CCA protest, leading to disruptions in train service. According to the activists, they had taken several precautions to minimize harm to the public including targeting an above-ground train. They were charged with obstructing an engine or carriageway on the railway and later acquitted by a jury in 2022.

Parfitt participated in the 2021 Insulate Britain protests calling for the government to insulate all homes in response to climate change. She was arrested at least 9 times. She was charged with public nuisance but was acquitted.

At a November 2023 Thanksgiving service in St. Paul's Cathedral, she and another octogenarian named Judy Bruce disrupted the proceedings and held banners that said "Will our children thank us?" and "Just Stop Oil". Parfitt and Bruce were arrested again the following year for a Just Stop Oil protest in the British Library. They damaged the glass protecting the Magna Carta, glued themselves to the display case, and held a banner that said "The government is breaking the law." They were charged with criminal damage. Parfitt stated that she would not have participated in the protest if there was a possibility of damaging the document. Citing Parfitt's criminal charges, Bishop Vivienne Faull declined to renew Parfitt's permission to officiate religious rituals. According to Parfitt, Faull had previously expressed support for her climate activism.

After Palestine Action caused 7 million GBP of damage to Royal Air Force planes, the British Parliament designated the direct action group as a terrorist organisation in July 2025. Later that month, Parfitt was arrested for sitting in a chair in London's Parliament Square with a sign that said: "I oppose genocide. I support Palestine Action." She criticised her arrest as an infringement of her civil rights. By October, she had been arrested three times at protests for supporting Palestine Action. The following July, she made a speech on top of a box that said "I oppose genocide" at a protest near Scotland Yard. She stated her support for Palestine Action and was arrested again.

=== Views on activism ===
Parfitt has stated that her activism is motivated by her religious duty to protect the earth and other people. She has expressed frustration with the limited impact of traditional activism. She has stated that: "The point is to make the best use of your latter years. And what could be a better use than trying to save humanity from extinction?" Additionally, she has stated that "The early Church was breaking the law all the time. So was Jesus."

== Books ==
Parfitt, Sue (2023-08-24). Bodies on the Line: Christians, Civil Resistance and the Climate Crisis. LAB/ORA Press. ISBN 978-1-7397162-8-8.
