= Patrick Field =

Patrick Field may refer to:

- Patrick Field (athlete)
- Patrick Field (judge)
