= Royal Court =

Royal Court may refer to:

== Court of justice ==
- Royal Courts of Justice, England and Wales
- The Royal Court, one of the courts of Jersey
- The Royal Court of Guernsey, the court of justice of Guernsey

== Royalty ==
- Royal court, the household and entourage of a monarch or other ruler
  - Royal Court of Saudi Arabia
  - Royal Court of Scotland
  - Royal Court of Sweden
  - Royal Court of Tiébélé, UNESCO World Heritage Site that formerly housed the court and royalty of Burkina Faso
- Royal Court, the name of the Royal Palace in the Oman city of Seeb

== Other uses ==
- Royal Court (web series), a talk show hosted by Brittany Broski
- Royal Court Theatre, in London, England
- Royal Court Theatre, Liverpool, a theatre in Liverpool, England
- The Royal Court, Timbaland's production company

== See also ==
- Court (disambiguation)
- Curia regis
- Royal (disambiguation)
- Royal Courts of Justice (Banksy mural)
