= Jeremy Johnson (judge) =

English jurist (born 1971)

The Honourable Sir Jeremy Johnson KC

Justice of the King's Bench Division
- Incumbent
- Assumed office 1 October 2019
- Monarchs: Elizabeth II; Charles III

Personal details
- Born: 11 May 1971 (age 55)
- Education: University of Oxford

Sir Jeremy Charles Johnson KC known in court as Mr Justice Johnson (born 11 May 1971), is a British barrister and justice of the High Court of Justice of England and Wales.

== Early life ==
Brought up in Sheffield, Yorkshire, Johnson was educated at Ampleforth College, then at the University of Oxford, where he learnt to fly and graduated BA in maths and philosophy, and finally at Middlesex University, where he gained a graduate diploma in law.

== Career ==
Johnson was called to the bar from the Middle Temple in 1994 and practised in general common law and public law from chambers at 5 Essex Court. Specialising in criminal cases and those involving government departments, he became a member of the Attorney General's Panels for the conduct of civil litigation on behalf of the British government.

In 2009, Johnson was appointed as a Recorder, and in 2011 he was promoted to Queen's Counsel. In 2016 he was authorised to act as a Judge of the High Court of Justice to hear cases in the Queen's Bench Division; in 2018 he was given authority to act also as a judge in the Administrative Court.

In August 2019, with Jennifer Eady QC, Alison Foster QC, Frances Judd QC, Pushpinder Saini QC, and John Cavanagh QC, Johnson was announced as a new Justice of the High Court. In October 2019 his appointment was confirmed as to the Queen's Bench Division, and on 14 November 2019 he was knighted by Queen Elizabeth II.

In April 2020, Johnson was appointed by the Investigatory Powers Commissioner, Sir Brian Leveson, as a temporary Judicial Commissioner under the Coronavirus Act 2020. In August 2023, he was appointed as a Commissioner until 2028.

Johnson took up the position of Deputy Senior Presiding Judge for England and Wales for a 2 year term beginning on 1 October 2026.

== Notable cases ==
=== MI6 and Princess Diana Inquest (2007) ===
In 2007, with Robin Tam QC, Johnson represented MI6 and the Foreign and Commonwealth Office at the Inquest into the death of Diana, Princess of Wales.

=== Julian Assange U.S. Extradition (2024) ===
In March 2024, sitting in the High Court with Dame Victoria Sharp, Johnson found that Julian Assange had a real prospect of success with his appeal against extradition to the United States on three of the grounds he had argued, but they adjourned the leave to appeal application to give the US government three weeks to give assurances on the three matters. On 20 May, not satisfied with the response from the US, they granted Assange leave to appeal.

=== Tommy Robinson Contempt of Court (2024) ===
In October 2024, sitting at Woolwich Crown Court, Judge Jeremy Johnson sentenced Tommy Robinson (charged under his real name Stephen Yaxley-Lennon) to 18 months imprisonment after Robinson pleaded guilty to two counts of Contempt of Court for repeating false allegations against Jamal Hijazi, a 15-year old Syrian refugee who Robinson had targeted. In May 2025, Justice Johnson reduced Robinson's sentence by 4 months for having shown a "change in attitude" since he was sentenced.

=== Safiullah Ahmadi Defamation Case (2025) ===
In May 2025, Judge Johnson dismissed a lawsuit from an Afghan man living in Kabul, who had sued Guardian News & Media due to a publication by The Guardian in October 2022 that used a picture of this man to illustrate an article about the murder of Hamed Sabouri, who was an Afghan gay man. Johnson agreed with the Guardian's lawyer, Ben Silverstone, that being labelled a homosexual is not defamatory in common law.

=== Filton 6 Trial and Re-trial (2025-2026) ===
Judge Johnson was the presiding judge in one of the notable prosecutions of Palestine Action activists, that of the Filton 6. In that case he ruled that the defendants should face a "terrorism enhancement" to their criminal damage charges, in a judgement that the UK media was forbidden from reporting at the time. The jury in the trial were also kept unaware of this fact meaning that they found four of the activists guilty of charges not knowing that the maximum sentences for those charges would be much higher than usual. However, Johnson explained in his sentencing remarks at paragraph 3.2 that he had ruled at the outset of the case that the alleged offence of criminal damage had a terrorist connection. He went on to say that legislation prevented the reporting of that ruling. He explained that the defendants asked him not to lift the reporting restriction because they were concerned it might cause prejudice. He agreed to the request not to lift the reporting restriction at that stage even though there was a strong public interest in permitting reporting.

The sentencing provoked strong reaction by the press and legal commentators. Geoffrey Robertson KC wrote in the Guardian that the sentencing of the Filton 4 defendants as terrorists violated a basic principle of justice - namely that defendants should be sentenced for the crimes that the jury has convicted them of, not for a crime of terrorism that was never charged or put to the jury.

=== Rajiv Menon KC Contempt Proceedings (2026) ===
In relation to the same case Johnson initiated contempt of court proceedings against the defence barrister, Rajiv Menon KC, following his closing speech to the jury, in which Menon referred indirectly to the jury's right to acquit according to conscience. The proceedings attracted comment from a number of legal figures, including Michael Mansfield KC, who described them as unprecedented and expressed concern about their potential effect on criminal advocacy.

In May 2026, the Court of Appeal allowed Menon's appeal, holding that the High Court had no jurisdiction to entertain contempt proceedings initiated directly by the trial judge without an application by the Attorney General, and set aside the proceedings on that basis. The Court of Appeal did not determine whether Menon's conduct amounted to contempt. Following the judgment, Johnson referred the matter to the President of the King's Bench Division for consideration under the correct procedure. The matter was subsequently assigned to Mrs Justice Cheema-Grubb, who held that there was a prima facie case that Menon may have acted in contempt of court and that it was in the public interest for contempt proceedings to be instituted. She directed that the allegations proceed to a substantive hearing before her sitting as a judge of the Crown Court.

The hearing was originally scheduled to take place under Mrs Justice Cheema-Grubb on 28 July 2026. However, on 24 July 2026, the High Court of England and Wales ruled that an appeal challenging the jurisdiction of the High Court to rule on contempt should be allowed to proceed, resulting in an adjournment of proceedings until such time as the appeal could be heard.
