= Royal Courts of Justice (Banksy mural) =

Street mural by the anonymous artist Banksy

Coordinates: 51.514603°N 0.114565°W

On 8 September 2025, the passers-by noticed a mural stencilled by street artist Banksy onto the exterior wall of the Queen's Building of the Royal Courts of Justice on Carey Street, London. He captioned it on Instagram, Royal Courts Of Justice. London. Depicting a judge attacking an unarmed protester with a gavel, the mural was seen by activists as a comment on the legal crackdown on the protest group Palestine Action under the Terrorism Act 2000. Due to the status of the Queen's Building, completed in 1968, as a Grade II listed building, the work was in the process of being removed on 9 September.

== Description ==
The mural depicts a judge who wears a traditional judge's wig and a black robe, hitting an unarmed protester who lies on the ground with a gavel, a tool not used by judges in England and Wales. Red blood splatters are visible on the placard held by the protester; this is the only piece of colour used in the work, the rest of which is in black and white. A camera sits above the work, and was initially turned away in what was thought to be an act of symbolism.

== Background ==
In July 2025, the United Kingdom banned Palestine Action as a terrorist organisation, under the Terrorism Act 2000. This caused significant protests and crackdowns on support for the group by police; on 6 September 890 people were arrested at a demonstration against the ban on Palestine Action. Other protests were also subject to legal crackdowns, including the 2024 Just Stop Oil climate change protests, after which demonstrators were jailed for up to five years.

Banksy is an artist whose stencilled graffiti is frequently critical of government policy, including war and capitalism. He had previously done work in the West Bank in Palestine, creating Slingshot Rat near Bethlehem in 2007 and opening The Walled Off Hotel in Bethlehem in 2017. This hotel included a "modified Nativity" at the hotel, showing Jesus's manger in front of Israel's separation barrier, which was depicted as pierced by a star-shaped blast.

== Placement of the mural ==
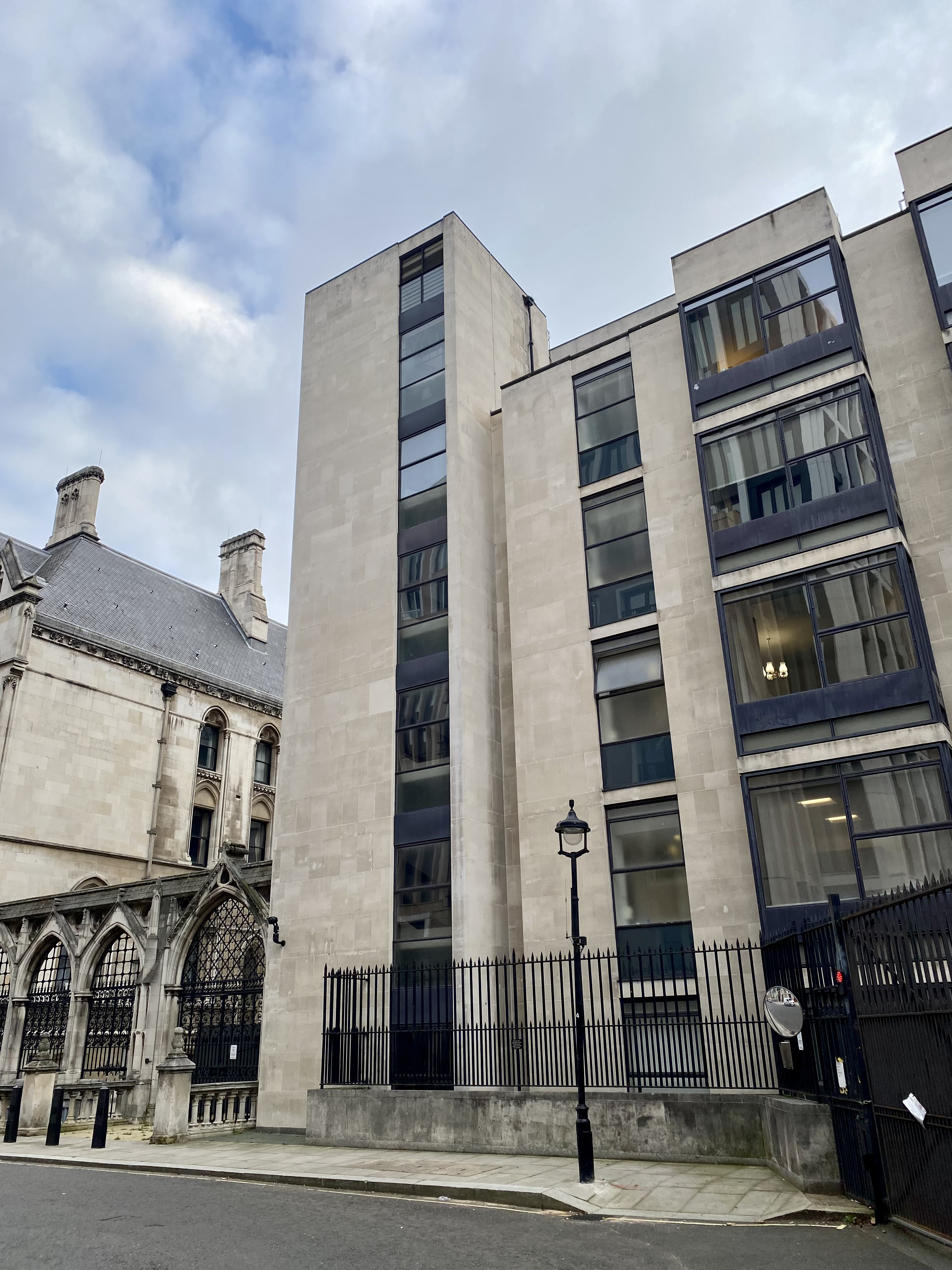
Banksy chose a blank space of wall on the Queen's Court Building.

Banksy chose an external wall of the Queen's Building of the Royal Courts of Justice complex in central London, on the quiet Carey Street, to place the mural. After placing the mural, Banksy shared a photo of it on Instagram, confirming that it was authentic, with the caption "Royal Courts Of Justice. London." Though the complex as a whole is 143 years old, and some sources have said it is listed at Grade I, the Queen's Building is newer, having been completed in 1968, and is Grade II listed.

=== Initial reactions and removal ===
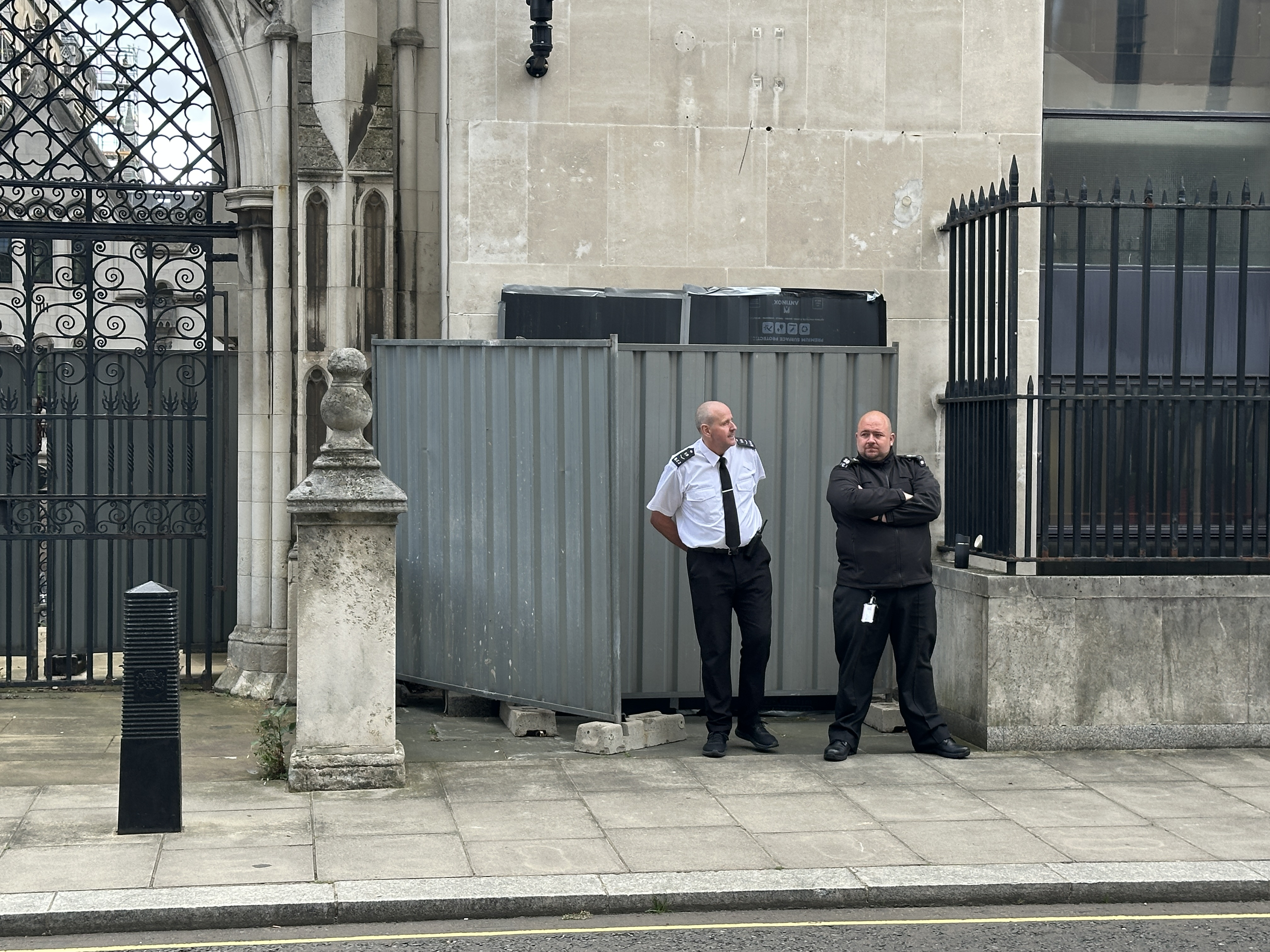
The piece was covered and guarded the day it was discovered.

The mural was first reported in the early hours of 8 September 2025, when passers-by shared images of the freshly painted work on social media. After being found, the mural was quickly covered using large sheets of black plastic and two metal barriers. The same day, the street had become busy with onlookers taking pictures despite the wall being covered. When questioned, security guards standing outside the building said that they did not know how much longer they would be required to stand guard. The mural was reported to the Metropolitan Police as criminal damage on 8 September. Some news sources have speculated that as a result of the police investigation, Banksy could have his identity revealed as a result of court proceedings as he would be required to publicly disclose his name. By lunchtime on 9 September, a queue had formed, and officers were allowing members of the public to, one by one, peek behind the barriers and take pictures. Court officials stated that the work would be removed. A spokesperson for HM Courts and Tribunals Service said that due to the Royal Courts of Justice being a listed building, it was "obliged to maintain its original character". The speed of the response led to debates about the balance between preserving public artworks and protecting historic sites. Work began to scrub away the image on 9 September, which continued into 10 September. Video was taken on 10 September of a masked man who worked to remove the mural as two police officers stood nearby. Following this, a "ghostly" image of the piece remained.

== Wider responses ==
While the artwork did not refer to any particular cause or incident, many activists saw the work as a reference to the Palestine Action ban, as well as Reuters and other media outlets. The group that organised the mass-arrest protest, Defend Our Juries, praised the mural, stating that it "powerfully depicts the brutality unleashed" by the ban of Palestine Action. Its statement also said that "When the law is used as a tool to crush civil liberties, it does not extinguish dissent, it strengthens it." Other commentators saw it as a broader reflection upon the wielding of state power and the judiciary against movements challenging the political establishment in Britain. Banksy's Instagram post of the mural gained over 1.5 million likes, over 8,000 comments and over 44,000 reposts.

Harriet Harman, a Labour Party peer, said she believed the mural was a "protest about the law", and said that "Parliament makes the law, and the judges simply interpret the law. I don't think there's any evidence, in terms of the right to protest, that judges have been clamping down on protests beyond what Parliament intended." Paul Gough, former vice-chancellor at Arts University Bournemouth, described the mural as "angry and direct", going on to write that "It's a very clever and detailed stencil, the faces look like they’ve been laser cut, and the splash of red is vintage Banksy – law at its most raw. No wonder it was covered up within minutes and will soon be wiped clean."

On social media, amid Operation Raise the Colours (a campaign to fly British and English flags in public spaces across the UK), photos of the mural that were previously posted by Banksy were misleadingly edited to include the flag of England and the Union Jack. Full Fact found no evidence that the mural had been changed to feature the flags before it was washed away.

In reaction to the work's removal, the Good Law Project posted on X that "The court is erasing Banksy's mural just like it's erasing our right to protest. [...] Silencing a work of art about silencing protest? Maybe it was a little too close to home." John Brandler, a gallery owner who had traded several Banksy murals in the past, said in an interview that he could not understand why the court service had not hired him, or another dealer, to remove the painting from the building's walls so it could be sold to raise money for charity. He valued the work at up to £5 million, or around US$6.8 million, and said that "Yes, it was criminal damage. But why not use that criminal damage to benefit the community?" Commenting on the remaining image of the work on 10 September, the law lecturer Sophie Doherty argued that "Through the removal of the piece, those in power have arguably added to the legacy and power of the image, further highlighting the silencing of those who wish to speak out against injustices and the violence of systems in power."

Irish hip-hop group Kneecap initially said the mural was hitting the "fucking nail on the head". They criticised that it had been covered up, and after it was partially washed away, they wrote that, "you can’t wash away genocide ... your complicity will always remain." In November, the mural featured on the cover artwork for Kneecap's song "No Comment" produced by Sub Focus, with permission from Banksy. The song is about "getting harassed by the British state".
