= Defend Our Juries =

UK-based activist group

- Formation: 2020
- Purpose: Right to protest
- Location: United Kingdom
- Methods: Nonviolent resistance, civil resistance, direct action, civil disobedience
- Fields: Protest rights Jury equity Environmental movement Climate movement Palestine movement
- Website: https://defendourjuries.net/

Defend Our Juries is a UK-based activist group formed in 2020 by, among others, former government lawyer Tim Crosland (following his contempt of court case regarding Heathrow expansion). It exists to highlight what it sees as the undermining of the UK legal process with regard to the right for individuals to act according to their conscience. It has supported members of campaigns such as Just Stop Oil and Insulate Britain during court proceedings, expressing concern for the undermining of the right to protest in the UK.

Since 2025, it has received large-scale attention for protests against the UK government's proscription of Palestine Action. The protests typically involve a large number of people sitting in public holding identical signs that read "I oppose genocide, I support Palestine Action". Because expressing support for a proscribed organisation is illegal in the UK under the Terrorism Act 2000, these protests have involved large numbers of arrests. As of November 2026, over 4,000 arrests have been made for holding signs expressing support for Palestine Action.

== Just Stop Oil ==
Defend Our Juries protesters have made a number of protests in support of Just Stop Oil activists on trial or in jail. In July 2024, following sentencing of five Just Stop Oil activists after their convictions at Southwark Crown Court to up to five years in prison, a demonstration was held in Worcester. In September, jail sentences for two activists were protested by Defend Our Juries and other groups with a 'silent exhibition of political prisoners past and present'. In October 2024, Defend Our Juries protesters marched through Cambridge. In January 2025, a group blocked a road with a sit-in outside the Royal Courts of Justice in central London, in support of an appeal case on behalf of 16 jailed Just Stop Oil activists, who they described as the 'Walney 16'. inspired at least in part by retired social worker Trudi Warner, whose peaceful, non-violent action on 27 March 2023, holding a placard with the words: 'Jurors you have the absolute right to acquit a defendant according to your conscience' resulted in her arrest. A further protest was held outside the Royal Courts of Justice in March 2025.

== Insulate Britain ==
Defend Our Juries protesters have also protested in support of the Insulate Britain campaign. Since 27 March 2023, when an activist was arrested for silently holding up a hand-written sign near Inner London Crown Court in Southwark where Insulate Britain activists were on trial, a number of demonstrations have drawn attention to the rights and duties both of defendants in court and of jurors, in particular highlighting the principle of jury equity, as inscribed on a stone in the Old Bailey.

== Lift the Ban ==
In 2025, Defend Our Juries started the Lift the Ban campaign, coordinating protests against the UK government's proscription of Palestine Action as a terrorist organisation following Palestine Action's damage of Royal Air Force jets at RAF Brize Norton. This campaign involved civil disobedience actions centered around activists sitting in public spaces with identical signs saying "I oppose genocide, I support Palestine Action". The proscription of Palestine Action meant that publicly supporting it became a crime under the Terrorism Act 2000, and these protests lead to mass arrests. These included protests in London on 5 July 2025, in London, Manchester, Cardiff and Derry on 12 July, on 19 July in London, Edinburgh, Manchester, Bristol and Truro, Cambridge, and in London on 9 August. Further days of protest action took place on 6 September, with more than 850 arrests taking place and 4 October with 488 arrests.

During July, August, September and October 2025, British police arrested over 2,100 individuals for showing support to Palestine Action, many of these at events organised by Defend Our Juries. The Metropolitan Police stated that peaceful demonstration in support of the Palestinian cause could be lawful, but in line with the government's proscription an illegal show of support for Palestine Action may result in arrest – with potentially significant personal consequences to those convicted of support for what is now considered to be terrorist group.

On 15 October 2025, court proceedings began against protesters who have held up placards in support of Palestine Action, with 28 defendants standing accused from among some 2,100 cases expected to need processing.

On 13 February 2026, the High Court ruled that the proscription was unlawful but would temporarily remain in place to allow the government to appeal.

On 15 June 2026 the Court of Appeal overturned the High Court ruling and found the ban on Palestine Action to be lawful. The five judges said that the ban was a "justified and proportionate interference with individual rights".

On 29 July 2026 the Supreme Court granted permission to appeal on the ground of whether the proscription is compatible with articles 10 (freedom of expression) and 11 (freedom of assembly) of the European Convention on Human Rights, but refused permission to appeal on whether the Home Secretary applied her policy appropriately. The appeal was heard on 4 and 5 November 2026. Judgement will be given later, perhaps in December 2026 or January 2027.

== Awards ==
On 22 September 2026, it was announced that Defend Our Juries had been awarded the 2026 Quaker Truth & Integrity by Quakers in Britain. The award praised Defend Our Juries for bringing public attention to the right and responsibility of juries to exercise their own judgement and conscience, particularly at a time when the right to trial by jury, the right to a fair trial and the right to protest have come under increasing pressure.
