= APPH =

- Type: Subsidiary
- Industry: Aerospace
- Predecessor: AP Precision Hydraulics
- Founded: 5 December 1985
- Headquarters: Sandymoor, Runcorn
- Area served: Worldwide
- Products: Aircraft landing gear, hydraulic systems
- Services: Spares, overhaul, and support
- Revenue: £46.8m(2013)
- Operating income: £4.4m (2013)
- Number of employees: c.400
- Parent: Héroux-Devtek
- Website: APPH

APPH designs and manufactures hydraulic systems, filtration, and landing gear for civil and military aircraft. It is presently owned by the Canadian aerospace supplier Héroux-Devtek, which completed the firm's acquisition during February 2014.

APPH was founded as AP Precision Hydraulics during 1951, being originally based in Speke. It relocated on several occasions before adopted its current location in Sandymoor, Runcorn. APPH was acquired by BBA Group in September 1987; numerous businesses acquired by its corporate parent would be aligned or wholly integrated with APPH over the following decades. The firm established a new division focused upon its aerospace filtration activities during 2000. APPH's former owner, BBA Aviation, seeking to reduce its exposure to the manufacturing sector, opted to sell it to Héroux-Devtek Inc during the 2010s.

== History ==
APPH originally commenced operations during 1951 as AP Precision Hydraulics (routinely shortened to APPH), being the British subsidiary of Automotive Products, Leamington Spa, England. At the time of its formation, the company was based on Shaw Road in Speke. A core element of the business was its advanced engineering design division, which has performed the design, certification, test and support of hydraulic systems and landing gear for numerous aircraft, including helicopters, fighter aircraft, civilian airliners and business jets.

During 1986, APPH was approached by the British industrial interest BBA Group, who sought to acquire the firm that specialised in aircraft undercarriages and hydraulics; at the time, BBA Group sought to diversify itself from its main operations as automotive supplier and viewed APPH as a strong gateway into the aerospace industry. In September 1987, the arrangements for BBA Group to purchase APPH were finalised with the ownership changing hands in exchange for £25 million (£72.32 million current value).

On 3 October 1995, the company formally begun trading under the name APPH. As the firm acquired further businesses, such as Arnoni Aviation Services Inc., Airight Inc. and Trinity Aerospace, these companies also took on the APPH branding.

During 2000, APPH established a new division focused upon aerospace filtration, the decision being heavily influenced by the awarding as contract by the British engine manufacturer Rolls-Royce Holdings to supply all the fuel and oil filters for the new Trent 500 turbofan engine. Prior to this reorganisation, APPH had been a long-established supplier of filters, such as those used in virtually every engine manufactured by Rolls-Royce in addition to the majority of aircraft produced by the various business based in the United Kingdom. Filter production had been originally carried out at the Leamington Spa site, being relocated to Tippinges Road, Bolton, as a consequence of the business' expansion.

APPH has received repeated deals with the Ministry of Defence to supply and support various military aircraft operated by the Royal Air Force, including the Hawker Siddeley Nimrod, British Aerospace Jetstream and Hawker Siddeley Dominie. Various international military services, including the US Army, US Navy, and US Air Force, have also contracted APPH to apply its specialist support for their fleets. Numerous first-rate aerospace manufacturers, such as AgustaWestland and Embraer, have appointed APPH to design and support the landing gear and associated systems of their aircraft.

On 3 February 2014, the Canadian aerospace group Héroux-Devtek Inc acquired APPH from BBA Aviation, purchasing 100 percent of the share capital at a cost of US$124M. Prior to the acquisition, APPH was the sole British-owned landing gear specialist in operation.

On 10 June 2021, protestors from direct action group Palestine Action "stormed, scaled and occupied" an APPH drone factory in Runcorn, claiming that APPH produces landing gear for Elbit Systems drones used in the Israeli-Palestinian conflict. Activists daubed red paint on the exterior, dismantled drone and aircraft machinery and destroyed windows.

== Aircraft Landing Gear ==
APPH is an established supplier of landing gear to both military and civilian sectors of the aviation industry. Aircraft fitted as such include:

- Dassault Aviation F6X
- Airbus Helicopters H175
- British Aerospace Jetstream 31/32
- British Aerospace Jetstream 41
- Saab 340
- Saab 2000
- Saab JAS 39 Gripen
- Saab Gripen NG
- BAE Systems Hawk
- Alenia Aeronautica C-27J
- AgustaWestland AW101 (Merlin)
- AgustaWestland AW159 (Wildcat)
- Britten-Norman Islander
- Britten-Norman Trislander
