= Terrorist connection =

Sentencing provision in English criminal law

Terrorist connection is a concept in English criminal law in which a court may decide during sentencing that an offence which is not in itself a terrorism offence has a "connection to terrorism", which should then be treated as an aggravating factor in sentencing, and which may also result in additional consequences for the offender both during custody and after release.

The concept was introduced in the Counter-Terrorism Act 2008 and was initially applied to a limited range of offences, including murder, attempted murder, arson and explosives offences. It was subsequently expanded in scope by the Counter-Terrorism and Sentencing Act 2021 to include all offences which have a maximum custodial sentence of more than 2 years.

A terrorist connection may be found where the offence was an act of terrorism, took place in the course of an act of terrorism, or was committed for the purposes of terrorism, where terrorism is defined according to the Terrorism Act 2000.

The use of terrorist-connection in sentencing attracted increased public scrutiny in 2026, particularly from legal experts and human rights bodies, following their application to Palestine Action defendants who had been convicted of criminal damage without being charged with terrorist offences. It was said to be the first time that such offences had been sentenced under the terrorist-connection regime.

== History ==
=== Counter-Terrorism Act 2008 ===
The statutory concept of a terrorist connection was introduced in the Counter-Terrorism Act 2008 under section 30 of the Act, under which a court sentencing an offender for certain offences must consider whether the offence had a "terrorism connection".

Under the original terms of the Act, the offences to which a terrorist connection could be applied were defined in Schedule 2 of the Act, and were limited to those which could cause endanger human life, including the following:

- Murder, manslaughter and culpable homicide
- Kidnapping and abduction
- Hijacking of aircraft, ships and spacecraft
- Various explosives and firearms offences
- Various nuclear, chemical and environmental offences

=== Sentencing Act 2020 ===
Section 69 of the Sentencing Act 2020 formalised the definition of terrorism to be used in making that evaluation to that used in the Terrorism Act 2000, namely:

1. It involves one of the following actions:

- serious violence against a person
- serious damage to property
- endangers a person's life, other than that of the person committing the action
- creates a serious risk to the health or safety of the public or a section of the public
- is designed seriously to interfere with or seriously to disrupt an electronic system

2. It is designed to influence the government or an international governmental organisation, or to intimidate the public or a section of the public

3. It is made for the purpose of advancing a political, religious, racial or ideological cause

=== Counter-Terrorism and Sentencing Act 2021 ===
The Counter-Terrorism and Sentencing Act 2021 further expanded the terrorist-connection regime by requiring courts to consider terrorist connection findings for a wider range of non-terrorism offences, where the offences have a maximum sentence of more than two years' imprisonment.

== Determination and consequences ==
A terrorist connection is determined by the sentencing judge and does not require the defendant to have been convicted of a terrorism offence. However, according to the Counter-Terrorism Act 2008 the judge is required to make the determination of whether a terrorist connection exists or not according to the criminal standard of proof.

A finding of terrorist connection is treated as a statutory aggravating factor when the sentencing judge determines the appropriate sentence. A terrorist-connection finding may also trigger consequences associated with terrorism offences, including notification requirements.

== Cases ==
=== Terrorist violence ===
Terrorist-connection findings have been made during sentencing in a number of cases involving violence motivated by political, religious or other ideological causes.

In the Parsons Green train bombing, Ahmed Hassan was convicted of attempted murder after a bomb he planted partially exploded on a London Underground train in Parsons Green in September 2017. In sentencing, the judge Mr Justice Haddon-Cave, said he would “be treating the incident as a terrorist offence”.

A terrorist connection was also applied following the 2020 Reading stabbings, in which Khairi Saadallah murdered three people.

In 2022, Ali Harbi Ali was sentenced to life imprisonment with a whole-life order for the murder of MP David Amess.

Mohammad Sohail Farooq was convicted in relation to a planned attack at St Mary's Hospital in Leeds in 2023.

Ahmed Alid was convicted of murdering Terence Carney and attempting to murder another man during knife attacks in Hartlepool in October 2023. The sentencing court found a terrorist connection to the offences.

In 2025, white supremacist Callum Parslow was sentenced for the attempted murder of an asylum seeker whom he had stabbed at a hotel in Worcestershire in 2024. The court found that the offence had a terrorist connection.

A terrorist connection was also found in relation to an arson attack on a Ukrainian-linked business in London which prosecutors said had been organised on behalf of the Russian Wagner Group.

== Application to protest offences ==
=== Filton protest case ===
Public scrutiny of section 69 increased in 2026 following its application to defendants convicted following a 2024 protest at an Elbit Systems facility in Filton, near Bristol.

Three defendants who had been convicted of criminal damage were found by the sentencing judge, Mr Justice Johnson, to have committed offences with a terrorist connection.

Freedom website wrote that the judge had determined that the case involved "high culpability" and "high harm", which would normally lead to sentencing guidelines of between 7 months and 4 years. The judge said that the case was so exceptional that the starting point would be 5 years, before applying aggravating and mitigating factors. Because of the finding of a terrorism connection, the defendants would serve two thirds of the sentence before being eligible for parole, as opposed to the usual 40% (to be reduced to 33% once the 2026 Sentencing Act comes into force).

In September 2026, it was announced that the defendants would seek leave to appeal against the sentence and specifically the terrorist connection ruling that Judge Johnson imposed. According to solicitor Simon Natas, who is acting for the four defendants, "serious property damage", one of the criteria used to determine whether the offence has a terrorism connection, is not clearly defined and could cover a wide range of offending, making the appeal against the sentence of "fundamental constitutional importance".

=== Barclays Bank protest ===
In 2026, five Palestine Action activists were sentenced following damage to a branch of Barclays in Burnley, Lancashire. The defendants had broken windows and thrown red paint during a protest concerning the bank's alleged financial relationships with companies supplying weapons to Israel.

Before sentencing, Judge Andrew Altham announced that he would consider whether the offences had a terrorist connection. The announcement attracted criticism from human-rights lawyers because the defendants had not been prosecuted on the basis that their offences had a terrorist connection and the issue was raised after the jury had returned its verdict.

At a pre-sentencing hearing in August 2026, Altham declined to find a terrorist connection, concluding that although the damage was significant, it did not amount to "serious damage" for the purposes of the statutory definition of terrorism.

=== RAF Brize Norton protest ===
On 20 June 2025, activists associated with Palestine Action entered RAF Brize Norton airbase without authorization and damaged two Airbus Voyager aircraft by spraying red paint into their engines and across parts of the airfield. The group released video footage of the action and stated that it was intended as a direct action protest against the United Kingdom's military support for Israel during the Gaza war.

Counter Terrorism Policing led the criminal investigation, citing the potential implications for national security. On 3 July 2025, four individuals were charged with conspiracy to enter a prohibited place for a purpose prejudicial to the safety or interests of the United Kingdom under the National Security Act 2023, as well as conspiracy to commit criminal damage. The fifth and sixth suspects were charged and remanded in custody in August 2025 and May 2026 respectively, pending trial that is scheduled to take place in January 2027.

The Global Asymmetric Threats Observatory reported comments from Thames Valley Police that stated that the prosecution was asserting a terrorist connection in this case.

=== Moog 4 protest case ===
On 26 August 2025, four pro-Palestinian protesters the Wolverhampton facility of US arms company Moog Inc. and occupied the roof of a building. Prosecutors alleged that the defendants caused damage to the site, including to roof structures and skylights. The protesters said that they had targeted the facility because of Moog's production of components for military aircraft used by Israel.

Four people were charged with criminal damage and were remanded in custody for six months before being released on bail. In September and October 2025, Moog also obtained a High Court injunction restricting protest activity at several of its United Kingdom facilities. In her evidence to the High Court, Moog's general counsel Elwira Kelly noted that the "Crown Prosecution Service (CPS) intends to link the offences to terrorism".

The first criminal trial began at Birmingham Crown Court in June 2026. Before the trial, media outlet The Canary suggested that if found guilty, the defendants would be potentially sentenced as terrorists. On 18 June, after more than 17 hours of deliberation, the jury was unable to return verdicts on which the required majority could agree and was discharged. The Crown Prosecution Service subsequently confirmed that it would seek a retrial, which was scheduled for March 2027.

== Criticism and debate ==
The application of terrorist-connection provisions to defendants who have not been charged with terrorism offences has attracted criticism from lawyers and civil-liberties organisations.

In June 2026, following the Filton convictions, barrister Rajiv Menon KC argued that treating the defendants as terrorists at sentencing would pose a "constitutional threat", arguing that factual determinations capable of substantially affecting sentence were being made by a judge rather than a jury.

Leading human rights lawyer Geoffrey Robertson spoke out, arguing that the terrorist connection regime undermined the legal principle of being sentenced only for the crime that one has been convicted of, and that no defendant should have to face punishment for a crime of terrorism that was never charged.

Human rights groups Amnesty International and Liberty UK also publicly expressed concern that the terrorism connection finding and sentencing implications represented a 'dangerous' move against the right to protest.
