= Fairford Five =

British anti-war protest group

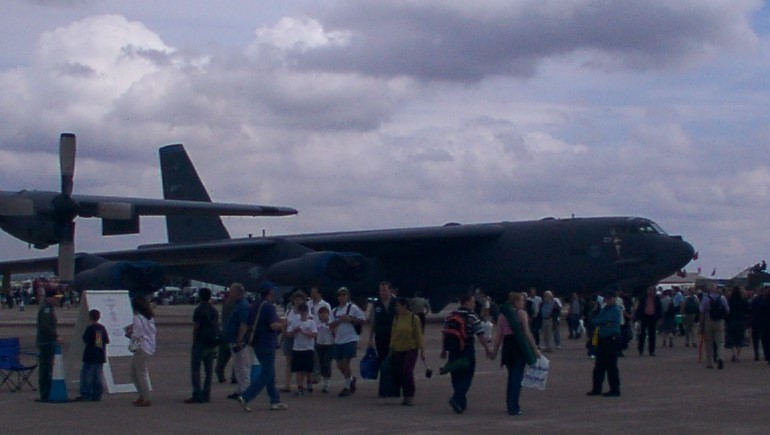
B-52 at RAF Fairford, 2003

The Fairford Five were a group of five British protesters (Paul Milling, Margaret Jones, Phil Pritchard, Toby Olditch and Josh Richards) who broke into the RAF Fairford military air base in 2003 and damaged equipment in order to disrupt military operations at the start of the Iraq War. The group was given its name by supporters and press articles reporting on the event and judicial trials which followed. Toby Olditch and Phil Pritchard had previously been members of Trident Ploughshares.

== Events ==
On the night of 13 March 2003 the first two protesters (Milling and Jones) breached the perimeter fence of the RAF Fairford base using bolt-cutters, and once inside damaged instrument panels, fuel tankers, support vehicle windscreens - which were needed to supply the B-52 bombers due to fly that day, and cut brake cables on 15 bomb trailers. They used hammers and are also reported to have been carrying grinding-paste to put into fuel tanks. In their commitment to peaceful protest, the two protesters left notices on the damaged vehicles to warn operators and prevent an accident. They were discovered by a US serviceman, did not resist arrest, and were taken to Stroud police station. Their actions delayed the planned missions and caused £10,000 worth of damage.

On the night of 18 March 2003 the two other protesters (Pritchard and Olditch) broke into the base and were arrested at the perimeter fence. They had intended to cause damage to the runway. Richards on the same date had also broken in to the air base and had intended to set fire to a USAF aircraft.

Bombers flew from Fairford to bomb Baghdad on 21 March.

== Trial ==
R v Jones
- Court: Bristol Crown Court
- Submitted: 2003
- Started: 2003
- Verdict: Guilty
- Charge: criminal damage

Case history
- Subsequent action: Appeal

Court membership
- Judge sitting: Justice Grigson

All five were charged with criminal damage and taken to trial. After some preliminary meetings, their case was heard in Bristol Crown Court by Justice Grigson, with the defence resting on the claim that the war was illegal, making their actions a justifiable attempt to prevent war crimes. The case put pressure on the attorney general Lord Goldsmith to reveal the advice he had given to the government in the lead up to the war.

A guilty verdict was reached at the court in Bristol, but through an appeal to the Royal Court of Justice the defendants were able to obtain a hearing at the British High Court. This caused enough concern at the Foreign Office to lead under-secretary of state Sir Michael Hastings to warn "it would be prejudicial to the national interest and to the conduct of the Government’s foreign policy if the English courts were to express opinions on questions of international law", in a four-page statement which was passed to the court minutes before the hearing was due to start. The appeal was eventually heard alongside two other similar cases, and was sustained, leading to a number of retrials.

Keir Starmer, future Labour leader and prime minister, was on a team representing one of the appellants.

=== Convictions ===
Milling received a conditional discharge and a £250 fine for costs, with Jones receiving a curfew order on 2 August 2007 which lasted until the following January.

=== Acquittals ===
Two of the defendants (Olditch and Prichard) were acquitted in May 2007 after the jury unanimously accepted that their actions were reasonable in the context of trying to prevent war crimes. This has been cited as a case of jury nullification, as the jury returned a verdict on moral grounds, despite the defendants having no legal defence.

In the case of Richards, a jury twice failed to reach a verdict and he was cleared of charges.

== Legacy ==
In 2025, comparisons were made with Palestine Action.
