= Aztec West =

Business park in South Gloucestershire, England

Coordinates: 51.543°N 2.568°W

- Major roads and bus stops near Aztec West

- Location within Gloucestershire
- OS grid reference: ST606828
- Unitary authority: South Gloucestershire
- Ceremonial county: Gloucestershire
- Region: South West
- Country: England
- Sovereign state: United Kingdom
- Post town: BRISTOL
- Postcode district: BS32
- Dialling code: 01454
- Police: Avon and Somerset
- Fire: Avon
- Ambulance: South Western
- UK Parliament: Filton and Bradley Stoke

Aztec West is a business park in South Gloucestershire, England, situated in the north of Bristol, near Bradley Stoke and Patchway. It is close to the M4 and M5 motorways and the Almondsbury Interchange. Adjacent is the A38 trunk road.

== History ==
The park has been developed since the early 1980s, but some land is still available for future development.

The name is said to derive from 'A to Z of Technology' and it was conceived as a science park. It was developed by the Electricity Supply Pension Scheme then sold to Arlington Securities in the mid-1980s.

== Architecture ==
The buildings are in the high tech and postmodern styles and were designed by practices including Nicholas Grimshaw, Michael Aukett, SOM and CZWG.

In 2018, selected buildings on Aztec West were listed.

== Companies ==
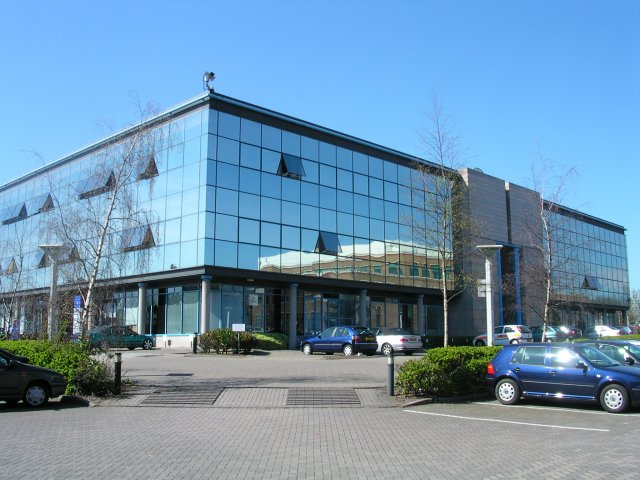
The Aztec Centre at Aztec West

Aztec West is home to over 100 companies, and 7,000 people work there. The Aztec Centre was opened by Margaret Thatcher on Friday 15 December 1989 and there is a plaque to commemorate this in its entrance. The park includes warehouse/factory units, the four star Aztec Hotel, several office villages, a central retail area and a Starbucks connected to a bar in a hotel, the first such facility in the UK. Included in the landscaping are three lakes. Nearby are the aerospace industries at Filton and the large business parks at the edge of Bradley Stoke.

Companies include Nokia, General Electric, Liverpool Victoria, HSS Hire, EE, Aardman, Imagination Technologies, Broadcom, Sondrel, Allianz, Hoare Lea, Atkins, The Co-operative Legal Services, CGI, Babcock, HSBC, Handelsbanken, Regus, Zuken, Vaillant, Virgin Media, Taylor Wimpey, SCC, SmartStream Technologies Limited and National Highways.

Elbit systems had a location here which was broken into and subsequently closed a year later.

== Transport ==
Aztec West is less than half a mile from the M5 Junction 16, and a mile from the Almondsbury Interchange with the M4. It is also in close proximity to the new housing project in Cribbs Causeway.

Public transport links are quite limited, although a number of bus services from the Bristol area do run on to Aztec West. The main services are:

- 3X Bristol City Centre to Aztec West via Redland and Horfield (operated by Stagecoach West)
- 10 Avonmouth to Thornbury via Southmead Hospital and Bristol Parkway Station (operated by Stagecoach West)
- 74 Temple Meads Station to Cribbs Causeway via Bristol Parkway and Bradley Stoke (operated by First West of England)
- m1 Hengrove Park to Cribbs Causeway via Bristol City Centre, UWE and Bradley Stoke (operated by First West of England)
- T1 Bristol to Thornbury via Bradley Stoke (operated by First West of England)

All buses stop at the various bus stops located around the Aztec West roundabout just outside of the business park. Currently the only bus to run around the business park loop road (Park Avenue) is the 3X, although certain journeys on service 10 also serve Park Avenue.

The nearest railway station is Patchway, located about 1½ miles away. However, Bristol Parkway, which is located around 3 miles away, can be reached more easily and two bus services (10 and 73) run at frequent intervals throughout the day connecting Aztec West to the station.

Bristol Airport, south of Bristol, can be reached in about 40–45 minutes by car or 1 hour 30 minutes by bus.
