= Plan B (charity) =

British charitable foundation

Plan B, incorporated in June 2016 as Plan B. Earth, is a British charitable foundation supporting a movement of strategic "legal action to prevent catastrophic climate change".

It is best known for two legal cases against the British government: firstly, brought with Friends of the Earth about incompatibility of the expansion of Heathrow airport and related "Airports National Policy Statement" with the Paris Agreement, which went to the Supreme Court of the United Kingdom; and secondly to align government policy with the Paris Agreement and young people's right to life under the European Convention on Human Rights. The High Court refused to grant the second judicial review in December 2021, partly as a result of the Supreme Court decision in the first, and partly on the grounds that courts were not competent to decide it. Plan B said it would appeal.

== Tim Crosland ==
Plan B's director is Tim Crosland, a lawyer who was formerly deputy director of the UK's National Crime Agency, and who now supports Extinction Rebellion.

== Cases ==
Plan B had earlier, in 2017, begun an action to force the UK government to adopt a net zero greenhouse gas target, a case that was supported by Professor David King, a former Chief Scientific Adviser to the UK government. In 2019, the government amended the Climate Change Act 2008 to set a net zero target in 2050.
