= Palestine Action =

British direct action group

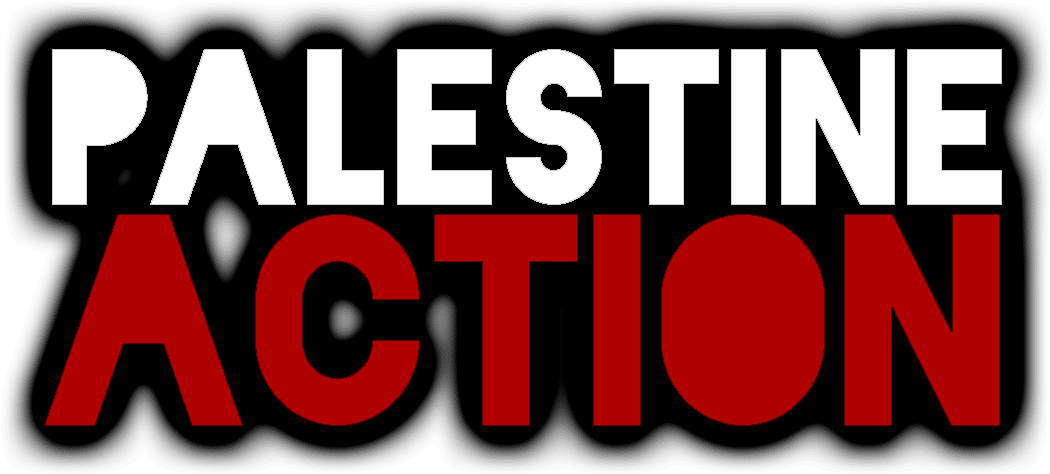
- Formation: 30 July 2020; 6 years ago
- Founders: Huda Ammori; Richard Barnard
- Type: Direct action movement
- Region served: United Kingdom
- Services: Opposition to British arms exports to Israel
- Website: www.palestineaction.org

Palestine Action, also called Pal Action, is a British direct action network founded in 2020 with the stated goal of "ending global participation in Israel's genocidal and apartheid regime". The organisation has been active in protests against the Gaza war in the United Kingdom, and many of its most high-profile actions such as the "Filton 24" case have been in response to the Gaza genocide. It has been proscribed as a terrorist group under the Terrorism Act 2000 since 2025, making membership in, material support for, or displaying items in support of the group a criminal offence in the UK.

Palestine Action uses direct action protests to disrupt the British arms industry, which it accuses of being complicit with Israel in conducting a genocide. (Note: A United Nations Special Committee, Amnesty International, Médecins Sans Frontières, B'Tselem, Physicians for Human Rights–Israel, International Federation for Human Rights, numerous genocide studies and international law scholars, and other experts have called the situation in Gaza a genocide.) It has mounted 45 documented direct actions in the United Kingdom. Key targets of the group have been British factories of the Israeli weapons manufacturer Elbit Systems, along with RAF Brize Norton, a Royal Air Force base. In their campaigns, Palestine Action have used protest, occupation of premises, and destruction of property, which sometimes resulted in its members being arrested. An action in Filton on 6 August 2024 resulted in a lengthy legal process during which the defendants were held on remand for 18 or more months, during which time some undertook a hunger strike. In May 2026, mixed verdicts were returned after a retrial, and in June 2026 the four activists were sentenced to a total of over 20 years imprisonment.

In a decision subject to criticism from media and human rights groups, the British Government proscribed Palestine Action as a terrorist group on 5 July 2025 under the UK's Terrorism Act 2000, citing property damage caused by a group of members at Brize Norton the month prior, where the activists sprayed military planes with red paint. Subsequent reporting has revealed that the UK government had been considering the proscription of the group for at least a year prior to that date. Civil liberties groups criticised the ban as conflating protest with terrorism.

Between proscription and the end of April 2026, British police arrested at least 3,070 individuals for showing support to Palestine Action, many of these resulting from sit-ins in Parliament Square on 9 August 2025 and 6 September 2025, and in Trafalgar Square on 4 October 2025. (Note: See the table in § Defiance of proscription.) Further silent vigils were held in November 2025, and during the wave of silent action over 600 more arrests were made.

On 13 February 2026, the High Court of Justice ruled that the proscription was unlawful but would temporarily remain in place to allow the government to appeal. On 15 June 2026 the Court of Appeal overturned the High Court ruling and found the ban on Palestine Action to be lawful. The five judges said that the ban was a "justified and proportionate interference with individual rights". Huda Ammori, one of the co-founders of Palestine Action, said that they would go to the Supreme Court and European Court of Human Rights in order to overturn it.

On 29 July 2026 the Supreme Court granted permission to appeal on the ground of whether the proscription is compatible with articles 10 (freedom of expression) and 11 (freedom of assembly) of the European Convention on Human Rights, but refused permission to appeal on whether the Home Secretary applied her policy appropriately. The appeal was heard on 4 and 5 November 2026. Judgment will be given later, perhaps in December 2026 or January 2027.

== History ==
Palestine Action was publicly launched on 30 July 2020 when activists broke into and spray-painted the interior of Elbit Systems' UK headquarters in London. The organisation was co-founded by Huda Ammori, daughter of a Palestinian father and an Iraqi mother, and Richard Barnard, a long-term left-wing activist.

A series of actions principally targeting Elbit and its supply chain followed, causing financial and reputational damage to those companies and resulting in numerous arrests both at the sites of the group's actions and in wider police raids.

In Manchester the day after the October 7th attacks, Barnard, referring to the attacks using Hamas' term for them "al-Aqsa flood", said "When we hear the resistance, the al-Aqsa flood, we must turn that flood into a tsunami of the whole world." Jonathan Hall, the Independent Reviewer of Terrorism Legislation said that the speech was "in the territory of encouraging terrorism" and that Barnard was "inviting people to do something similar". When this was put to him by the BBC, "Mr Barnard defended his speeches and made clear that he was talking about direct action against those British industries that supply Israel's military."

In August 2024, Barnard was charged with violating the Terrorism Act by "expressing an opinion that is supportive of a proscribed organisation contrary to section 12 of the Terrorism Act 2000", referring to the Manchester speech and to Hamas, as well as two charges of "encouraging or intending to encourage" criminal damage. He was to appear in Westminster Magistrates' Court on 14 September 2024, and as of June 2025 was awaiting trial.

In June 2025, the Home Office announced that it intended to designate the group as a proscribed terrorist organisation after the group broke into RAF Brize Norton, spraying paint into the engines of two Royal Air Force Airbus A330 MRTT refuelling planes. Proscription of the group had been discussed internally by government and police for over a year at that point. On 2 July, the House of Commons voted 385–26 to proscribe Palestine Action alongside two other groups as terrorist organisations. The order was accepted by the House of Lords the following day and Palestine Action was proscribed from 5 July 2025. The High Court had a hearing on 21 July to consider an application for a judicial review to quash the proscription order; a hearing on 4 July declined to grant an interim relief order.

Since 5 July 2025, it has been an offence under the UK's Terrorism Act 2000 to be a member of Palestine Action, to fundraise for it, and to wear or display items arousing reasonable suspicion of membership or support. It is also an offence if someone invites support or "expresses an opinion or belief supportive of" Palestine Action and "in doing so is reckless as to whether a person to whom the expression is directed will be encouraged to support" it. The membership or inviting support offences carry a maximum penalty of up to 14 years in prison and fines, and displaying supporting items a penalty of up to 6 months in prison. A legal action against the group's proscription has been ongoing since November 2025.

== Actions ==
=== Actions against Elbit ===
On 19 May 2021, during the 2021 Israel–Palestine crisis, four members of the group dressed in red boiler suits climbed onto the roof of a drone factory owned by UAV Tactical Systems, a subsidiary of Elbit Systems, in Meridian Business Park, Leicester. The occupation lasted six days, and a total of 10 arrests were made for conspiracy to commit criminal damage and aggravated trespass. The defendants were cleared after the trial judge instructed the jury to consider the common law defence of necessity and the statutory defence of protection of property under Section 5(2)(b) of the Criminal Damage Act 1971. The same year the group staged similar occupations of Elbit Systems sites in Bristol, Oldham (in collaboration with Extinction Rebellion), and Tamworth (in collaboration with Animal Rebellion). Repeated occupations and damage at the Oldham site (a subsidiary called Ferranti P&C) preceded its permanent closure and sale in January 2022. This series of actions contributed to multi-day shutdowns and potentially contributed to the loss of a £2.1bn contract between Elbit UK and the Ministry of Defence.

In April 2022, two Palestine Action protestors chained themselves to the gates of a factory of UAV Tactical Systems Ltd, a subsidiary of Elbit Systems, in Braunstone. Other activists gathered nearby with signs stating "Free Palestine". Three protestors were arrested. A spokesperson for the group said that "Direct action will not cease until all Elbit sites are closed". These and other actions contributed to multi-day shutdowns and potentially contributed to the loss of a £2.1bn contract between Elbit UK and the Ministry of Defence.

In April 2024, Somerset County Hall, a Grade II-listed public building owned by Somerset Council, was splashed with red paint after a Palestine Action protest. The protest was related to the council's leasing of a building in the Aztec West business park to arms company Elbit Systems UK.

==== Instro Precision action ====
On 17 June 2024, seven activists were arrested at the main facility of Instro Precision in Sandwich, Kent. Instro Precision is a wholly-owned subsidiary of Elbit Systems, specialising in laser targeting, night vision and fire control equipment. Nine activists were ultimately charged with criminal damage, burglary with intent and violent disorder. A trial date has been set for 5 October 2026 at the Old Bailey.

According to press reporting, the Crown Prosecution Service is considering applying for a terrorism connection to be applied under Section 69 of the Sentencing Act, which will be determined by a Judge at sentencing, if the defendants are convicted.

The following month, Hydrafeed, a manufacturer of machining automation equipment for CNC turning and milling applications, was attacked by Palestine Action activists accusing it of supplying Instro Precision with machinery used for manufacturing military equipment. Hydrafeed denied having any affiliation with Elbit Systems, claiming "Hydrafeed would like to inform all of our customers and suppliers that we have absolutely no connection with the aforementioned company. We do not supply and never have supplied Elbit Systems with any of our products... This act of vandalism on Hydrafeed's property and machines was completely unfounded."

Palestine Action said they had written to Hydrafeed "to explain that Instro Precision is a wholly-owned subsidiary of Elbit Systems, showing evidence of their business relationship with the Israeli arms maker." Later in the year Hydrafeed allegedly broke off all ties with Elbit Systems, reportedly sending an email to Palestine Action reading; "Hydrafeed has made it clear to Instro Precision that it is not prepared to provide any sales or services of its products to Instro Precision, its parent company Elbit Systems or any of Elbit Systems subsidiaries now or in the future." Multiple shutdowns and damage at the site resulted in an estimated £1 million+ in losses and temporary immobilisation of the facility.

In subsequent press reporting, it was alleged that cargo documents confirmed Instro Precision has been shipping targeting equipment to Israel amid the Gaza genocide, with military tripods, tripod support systems, radar kits, and aerial reflectors among the items being sent from Instro's facility in Sandwich, Kent to Elbit factories in Israel between November 2023 and May 2025.

==== Filton 24 raid and trial ====
On 6 August 2024, 6 activists drove a repurposed prison van into Elbit's compound at Aztec West, breached security fences, entered the facility and caused substantial damage to property and equipment. The action also involved confrontations with security personnel and police, during the course of which a police officer sustained a fracture to her lumbar spine. Six activists were arrested at the scene and there were raids on homes subsequently. 24 people were charged in all.

On 16 March 2025, Elbit's Aztec West site was targeted by four Palestine Action activists with, according to BBC News, a "cherry picker style vehicle and a hammer attached to a rope to smash second floor windows and douse [the building with] red paint". The four were arrested on the site, all being charged with conspiracy to damage property and three being charged with one count of assault by beating. In September 2025, the Aztec West site was reported by The Guardian to have closed unexpectedly, with the site found deserted aside from security staff despite a lease running until 2029.

In May 2026, after a lengthy legal process and more than 18 months on remand four activists were convicted of criminal damage and one of GBH without intent during the actions at the Bristol factory in 2024. During the trial defendants were prohibited from describing the context or reasons for the actions that they took. It was then revealed in UK media that the defence barrister will be charged with contempt of court for reminding jurors in the first trial of their right to acquit on conscience. Four people received sentences totalling 24 years, significantly lengthened by Justice Johnson's decision to apply a terrorism connection to the charges. This decision had been taken in March 2025 and was kept secret from jurors and the public until after convictions had been secured. The Filton 4 prisoners became the first people in the UK to be sentenced with this "terrorism enhancement" for political protest offences.

=== Actions against Teledyne ===
Teledyne Technologies is a US-owned technology company which has multiple contracts to supply parts to the F-35 combat aircraft program, with a particular focus on complex electronic components and subsystems for data, communication, radar and electronic warfare.

On 2 April 2024, four protesters scaled the roof of the factory of Teledyne Defence and Space Ltd in Shipley, Yorkshire, allegedly damaging roof tiles and breaking windows. They were charged with criminal damage of £570,000 but the first trial in September 2024 returned no verdict and the jury was discharged. At a retrial at Bradford Crown Court in February 2026, all four defendants were found guilty and three of them were sentenced to 20 months in jail.

In October 2024, Palestine Action targeted a factory in Bromborough, Wirral Peninsula, a producer of F-35 fighter plane components owned by one of its UK subsidiaries, Teledyne CML Composites. The action consisted of breaking through the roof and spraying red paint into cleanrooms, with a manager for Teledyne allegedly claiming "damage to the clean rooms could halt production for up to 12 months". Three of the four defendants were given suspended jail sentences, while the fourth was given a community order.

=== Actions against Leonardo ===
In November 2023, Palestine Action activists spray painted messages "Free Gaza" and "Free Palestine" across weapons company Leonardo S.p.A.'s UK head office in Piccadilly, with the protestors stating that Leonardo had supplied Israel with fighter jets. Two men were arrested on suspicion of racially aggravated criminal damage, which was investigated as a hate crime. In May 2024, Edinburgh Palestine Action activists targeted a Leonardo factory in Crewe Toll, spraying red paint over the factory and fighter-jet models, as well as claiming to have sabotaged "internet cables", with a spokesperson for the group saying, "In the early hours of Tuesday 28th May [2024], a group opened the box of cables, cut the internet wires, sprayed expanding foam inside the box and spray painted 'Stop Arming Israel' on the lid." The action was carried out, against Leonardo, according to PA Scotland, for "continuing to arm the Israeli military with weapons". In January of the same year, several activists occupied the roof of the same factory.

=== RAF Brize Norton break-in ===
In June 2025, members of Palestine Action gained access to RAF Brize Norton on electric scooters and used "repurposed fire extinguishers" to spray red paint into the turbines of two Royal Air Force Airbus Voyager refuelling planes while recording themselves doing so and releasing a short video of the action. The RAF Brize Norton base is used to send flights to RAF Akrotiri in Cyprus, from where the RAF has conducted hundreds of surveillance flights over the Gaza Strip during the Gaza War. Palestine Action said "Despite publicly condemning the Israeli government, Britain continues to send military cargo, fly spy planes over Gaza and refuel US and Israeli fighter jets". Palestine Action characterised its actions as genocide prevention and the prevention of British war crimes. The UK Ministry of Defence, and a defence expert, said that RAF Voyagers had not been involved in refuelling or supporting Israeli air force jets, although they had been used in British air attacks in Yemen, and in Iraq and Syria. RAF engineers who assessed the damage said "they did not expect the incident to affect operations." Palestine Action also sprayed red paint across the runway, symbolising the blood of the Palestinians killed in Gaza, and left a Palestinian flag at the base. The same day, the Home Secretary, Yvette Cooper, briefed the media of her intention to introduce legislation in Parliament to proscribe Palestine Action under the Terrorism Act 2000 the following Monday, making membership in or support of the group illegal.

On 3 July 2025, four members of Palestine Action – Amy Gardiner-Gibson, Jony Cink, Daniel Jeronymides-Norie and Lewie Chiaramello – were charged with conspiracy to enter a prohibited place knowingly for a purpose prejudicial to the safety or interests of the United Kingdom, and conspiracy to commit criminal damage. ‘Conspiracy’ is an offence under section 1 of the Criminal Law Act 1977; ‘entering a prohibited place knowingly for a purpose prejudicial to the safety or interests of the United Kingdom’ was made an offence by section 4 of the National Security Act 2023, and can lead to imprisonment for up to 14 years. All charges were related to the 20 June 2025 RAF Brize Norton action. On 3 August a fifth person, 22-year-old Muhammad Umer Khalid, was charged the same offences relating to the Brize Norton break-in.

=== University protests ===
In March 2024, Palestine Action claimed responsibility for spray painting a historic portrait of politician Arthur Balfour at Trinity College, Cambridge. Palestine Action said the action was taken because of the 1917 Balfour Declaration. Three months later, in June 2024, Cambridge students, in collaboration with Palestine Action, sprayed the historic Senate House red in the University of Cambridge. In March 2025, members of Palestine Action threw red paint on the "Old Schools" building in the University of Cambridge, citing further pressure for the university to divest from companies selling arms to the Israeli military. In November 2024, Palestine Action members broke a glass cabinet in the University of Manchester's Chemistry Building on the Oxford Road campus, and stole two busts of Chaim Weizmann, the first president of Israel and a former teacher at the university. Palestine Action said it had "abducted" the busts to mark the anniversary of the Balfour Declaration in 1917. As of November 2024 one individual has been arrested for the action.

=== Palestine Action in Germany ===
On 8 September 2025, in the early morning hours, five Palestine Action activists were arrested in Germany following an alleged break-in and vandalism at an Elbit facility in Ulm. The facility had made at least seven arms shipments to sister facilities in Israel during 2025. Those shipments included components for a device used "for acquiring targets and engaging fire from long ranges". The lawyer for one of the defendants stated that this showed that the "actions of the Ulm 5 were clearly aimed at a legitimate goal, namely, to end the killing of civilians in Gaza".

The activists allegedly forced entry into the building and caused damage to equipment. They recorded themselves during the incident. The activists were later indicted on aggravated trespass, property damage, and participation in a coordinated criminal act. During the legal procedure, the activists characterised the action as political protest against arms exports. Elbit Systems condemned the incident as vandalism and added "It is unacceptable that violent groups, presumably under the influence of foreign agitators, are repeatedly attempting to disrupt production processes in Ulm, seeking to endanger employees and to instill fear... production of systems for the German Armed Forces at the Ulm plant will resume shortly."

On 27 April 2026, the trial of the "Ulm 5" was postponed for a week after complaints by the defence lawyers that they were not permitted access to their clients. The trial is being held in the Stammheim Prison widely associated with the Red Army Faction trials of the 1970s and the defendants face charges of trespass and damage to property, as well as "membership of a criminal organisation" under Section 129 of the German penal code. This Section 129 is "commonly applied in cases of "terrorism" and organised crime, and can lead to a prison sentence of up to five years," and in May 2024 it was used against members of the peaceful climate action group Last Generation. The five defendants: Daniel Tatlow-Devally, Zo Hailu, Crow Tricks, Vi Kovarbasic and Leandra Rollo have been held in pretrial detention beyond the legally-permitted six month limit and their families have denounced the "extreme isolation" of the conditions in which they have been held.

When the trial resumed on 11 May, the presiding judge Kathrin Lauchstadt repeatedly barred the defence team from filing submissions objecting to seating arrangements which prevented them from speaking confidentially with their defendants. The defence team further objected that the presentation of the defendants before the press in handcuffs and behind plate glass was violating their EHCR right to presumption of innocence and a fair trial. This statement was met by applause from the public gallery, on which the judge ordered the removal of observers from the court for 10 minutes, "visibly los[ing] her composure", according to one attendee. The families and lawyers called for the judge's recusal and denouncing the proceedings as a "sham trial."

=== Other protests ===
On 10 June 2021, three protestors from the group "stormed, scaled and occupied" an APPH drone factory in Runcorn. Activists daubed red paint on the exterior, dismantled drone and aircraft machinery and destroyed windows. The next day all three were arrested on suspicion of criminal damage and aggravated trespass. On 14 June 2021, the fourth anniversary of the Grenfell Tower fire, a similar occupation protest was staged at an Arconic factory in Kitts Green, Birmingham by three protestors. Arconic provided the cladding that allowed the rapid spread of fire across Grenfell Tower, and according to Palestine Action provide "materials for Israel's fighter jets". The occupation ended when two activists were arrested on the roof of the building two days later. One activist was remanded in prison and immediately went on hunger strike. The activist said they would end their strike if any one of four conditions were met: release of Palestine Action protestors; the eviction of Elbit from its London headquarters by property firm LaSalle Investment Management; the closure of all Elbit Systems' British operations or; release by the government of all correspondence and documents relating to its dealings with Elbit and its subsidiaries.

In January 2024, it was alleged that activists from Palestine Action were intending to target the London Stock Exchange by damaging the building and preventing trade. Six people were arrested over the suspected disruption plot. The same month, Palestine Action vandalised an office of the logistics company Kuehne + Nagel in Milton Keynes by smashing windows and spraying the building with paint. Palestine Action said the action was taken because "in the past 100 days over 25,000 Palestinians were killed". Palestine Action said they targeted the company because it was assisting the delivery of weapons to Israel.

In September 2024, the London headquarters of consultancy firm APCO Worldwide was targeted by Palestine Action over its representation of the UK interests of Elbit Systems. Activists daubed the façade of the office building with red paint using repurposed fire extinguishers, blocked the entrance and locked the doors with a bike lock.

Throughout 2024, Palestine Action targeted Barclays Bank, with the demand that the bank divest from "Israel's weapons trade and fossil fuels." Following multiple bank-branch blockades and damage, several branches closed temporarily. In October 2024, Barclays announced full divestment from Elbit systems, an outcome activists attributed to sustained pressure.

In March 2025, Palestine Action claimed responsibility for vandalism to the Trump Turnberry golf course in Scotland in protest at President Trump's proposal to take over Gaza.

== Legal consequences ==
In May 2024, seven Palestine Action activists who broke into a Bristol HQ of Elbit Systems, an international defence technology firm, to destroy equipment in 2022 were given suspended prison sentences and ordered to pay more than £5,000 in compensation. The protesters sprayed the messages "Free Palestine" and "Shut Elbit Down" on walls and windows. Elbit Systems UK said it does not supply arms to Israel although Elbit's website said that Elbit supplied military drones to the Israeli military. In August 2024, five Palestine Action activists were found guilty for the 2022 protest action against Thales UK in Govan, Glasgow, with four of the defendants receiving 12-month custodial sentences and the fifth receiving 14 months.

An initial 10 people were raided and arrested by counter-terror forces under the Terrorism Act 2006 on 19 November 2024 in relation to the August 2024 action against the Elbit Systems HQ in Bristol, in addition to those previously arrested on the scene who were charged for non-terror related crimes. In total, 18 activists were held in custody, dubbed the Filton 18. Tom Southerden of Amnesty International said the terrorism powers were misused to circumvent normal legal protections, resulting in excessively long pre-charge detention. Documents released under Freedom of Information suggest that the UK government shared contact details of counter-terrorism police and prosecutors with the Israeli embassy during the investigation into the incident.

Four members of PA were released on bail on 13 November 2024 after being arrested the previous day on suspicion of a public order offence for a lock-on protest to block entry to two Elbit Systems buildings in the Aztec West business park. On 4 February 2026 'not guilty' verdicts were returned for all six defendants on the charge of aggravated burglary. Other charges (criminal damage and violent disorder) resulted in partial or no verdicts being returned. Three defendants, Rajwani, Rogers and Devlin, were found not guilty of violent disorder. Charges of aggravated burglary against 18 others were subsequently dropped.

== Hunger strikes ==
On 20 October 2025, a press release was issued by Prisoners4Palestine stating that on 2 November 2025, six activists held pending trial for actions during events at Filton would start on a hunger strike. All of the hunger strikers are expected to be held in detention for more than a year before their trial date, twice the custody time limit of 6 months. On 1 December an early day motion was tabled by 13 members of parliament calling on the Secretary of State for Justice to intervene urgently. A seventh prisoner started a hunger strike in the first week of December. By 9 December, ten Palestine Action activists were on hunger strike in three prisons, with the strike having spread to Whitemoor and Frankland from Belmarsh prison, and, despite remarkably little media attention, 36 MPs had signed the EDM. On 10 December, lawyers for the hunger strikers sent a further letter to David Lammy, MP, expressing grave concern regarding their health; an exchange in Parliament drew comment from Jeremy Corbyn, John McDonnell and the Speaker of the House, Sir Lindsay Hoyle.

On 12 December, one of the hunger strikers was one of four associated with a break-in at RAF Brize Norton who appeared in the Old Bailey by videolink and was remanded in custody for a further period. By 17 December 51 MPs and peers had written to David Lammy about the protest; that day, two detainees were reported to have ended their hunger strikes, one after 13 days without food and the other after 41 days. At that point, the two longest-striking prisoners had both been without food for 45 days; two more have been refusing food for 38 days and 37 days, with a fifth (with underlying health conditions) refusing food intermittently. On 19 December, Emily Lawford, wrote in the New Statesman that there remained six detainees on hunger strike, across the prisons of Bronzefield, Pentonville, Wormwood Scrubs, Peterborough and New Hall; for The Independent, Dan Haygarth profiled five hunger strikers and mentioned that a sixth was refusing food intermittently.

On 23 December 2025, Swedish activist Greta Thunberg was arrested along with two other people by London police following a protest she participated in in solidarity with activists from Palestine Action in support of the hunger strikers. Also on 23 December the fourth Palestinian action hunger striker, Amy Gardiner-Gibson, who also goes by the name Amu Gib ended their strike after being taken to the hospital, however the four remaining hunger strikers: Kamran Ahmed, Heba Muraisi, Teuta Hoxha and Lewie Chiaramello made a statement saying they will continue with their protest. The last two of the group who had continued to refuse food, Heba Muraisi and Kamran Ahmed, ended their hunger strikes on 15 January 2026; by then Heba Muraisi's protest had lasted for 73 days.

== Proscription ==
=== Background ===
The activities of Palestine Action were an immediate cause for concern for government ministers in the UK and Israel. In August 2020, one month after the group emerged, then UK foreign secretary Dominic Raab met with Orit Farkash-Hacohen, Israel's former minister of strategic affairs, who "pressed Raab on direct action protests against Israeli companies in Britain, noting how “the London offices of Elbit Systems” had been attacked for the fourth time in as many weeks." In 2022, then-Home Secretary Priti Patel met with Martin Fausset, the CEO of Elbit UK to “discuss protests and security”. The meeting produced a series of suggested actions, which were entirely redacted when the document was made public under FOI.

After the change of government, in December 2024 a private meeting took place between three Elbit representatives and three officials from the Home Office working under Yvette Cooper. The attendees have not been named and no record was released in response to a FOI request, by "mutual agreement" among the attendees.

After Palestine Action targeted a factory of the US defence company Teledyne Technologies in 2022, Richard Dannatt, who is a member of the House of Lords and a paid adviser to Teledyne, asked the government to take action against the group. Freedom of Information (FOI) documents obtained by Palestine Action showed that Israeli embassy officials asked the UK Attorney General's Office (AGO) to intervene in cases involving the prosecution of UK protesters. Redactions were made to the FOI documents because disclosure "would be likely to prejudice the UK's relations with Israel". In his response to the embassy officials, the director general of the AGO mentioned the Police, Crime, Sentencing and Courts Act 2022, which placed restrictions on protests, and a recent court case which determined that protesters accused of "significant" criminal damage could not use the protection of human rights as a defence.

Documents obtained by Palestine Action through FOI gave details of government meetings to "reassure" Elbit Systems about Palestine Action's campaign against it. Palestine Action said that the documents demonstrate that the Home Office tried to pressure police and prosecutors to crack down on activists targeting Elbit Systems. In May 2024, the government's adviser on political violence Lord Walney published a report that recommended proscribing a new category of "extreme protest groups", including Palestine Action, with sanctions on their ability to fundraise and its right to assembly. Reporting by Private Eye shows that at the time of the proscription the UK's ministry of defence had ties with Palestine Action's main target: Elbit systems was close to winning a two billion pound contract for military training.

A UK Government Counter Terrorism Policing (CTP) Report dated 27 June 2024 shows that the government had considered proscribing Palestine Action prior to that date. In the document there is a discussion of a meeting that CTP had held with prosecutors to look at "the resource implications" if Palestine Action were "declared as a terrorist group". Lawyers for those of the Filton 6, who were found guilty of criminal damage and face a "terrorism enhancement" to their sentencing on 12 June 2026, said that the timing of the document, five weeks before the Filton action, shows that their clients had the "terrorism" connection secretly added to the charges to build the government's case for proscribing the group as whole. The Attorney General and CPS refused to confirm or deny the existence of relevant policy or sentencing guidelines.

=== Proscription after RAF Brize Norton break-in ===
The British government proscribed Palestine Action as a terrorist organisation from 5 July 2025, following the security breach at RAF Brize Norton and vandalism of a plane. The proscription was criticised by civil liberties groups, UN experts, British cultural figures and hundreds of lawyers as "conflating protest with terrorism". In June 2025, the government announced its intent to proscribe the group using anti-terrorism legislation. The government announced that security arrangements would be reviewed at the base. Following a written statement to the UK Parliament on 23 June, Home Secretary Yvette Cooper announced that a proscription order, under the Terrorism Act 2000, would be put before Parliament, which would seek to ban Palestine Action as a terror organisation, following parliamentary approval.

Controversially, Palestine Action was bundled together in a single order for proscription with two neo-Nazi groups, Maniacs Murder Cult and Russian Imperial Movement. MPs and Peers were therefore obliged to proscribe all three together or none of them, a move that was described as "sneaky" in the House of Lords by Baroness Jones of Moulsecoomb and was criticised by multiple MPs as it would increase the pressure on them to vote in favour of proscription. On 2 July 2025 the House of Commons voted by 385 votes to 26 to approve the Terrorism Act 2000 (Proscribed Organisations) (Amendment) Order 2025 (SI 2025/803), and proscribe the three organisations bundled together.

As of 30 November 2025, at least 2,489 people have been arrested most of them for holding signs supporting Palestine Action. One man was arrested and then de-arrested for wearing a T-shirt that read "Plasticine Action", which he wore to mock the ban. A declassified intelligence assessment published in September 2025 states that the majority of the group's actions would not meet the legal standard of terrorism. All three incidents which the report states constitute terrorism relate to property damage, which the report states "is typically more minor", including graffiti, petty vandalism and sit-ins. According to Alan Greene, senior counter-terrorism researcher at Birmingham Law School, this reliance on property damage "marks a radical departure" from earlier proscriptions.

On 5 October, Home Secretary Shabana Mahmood announced plans to enable the police to impose restrictions in location and duration or ban outright "repeat protests", in response to demonstrations against the Gaza war and the proscription of Palestine Action. The "cumulative impact" of earlier protests would be grounds "in and of itself" for the police to impose restrictions. The announcement was criticised by Amnesty International and Liberty. It was praised by Conservative leader Kemi Badenoch, but criticised by the Liberal Democrat home affairs spokesperson Max Wilkinson. Former director of Liberty Shami Chakrabarti warned what a future Nigel Farage government may do with these powers, and pointed out that protests are disruptive in order to be effective.

The cost to the Met of policing the ban over four days alone was £8.73m, exceeding £10m including investigation and casework costs.

=== Criticism ===
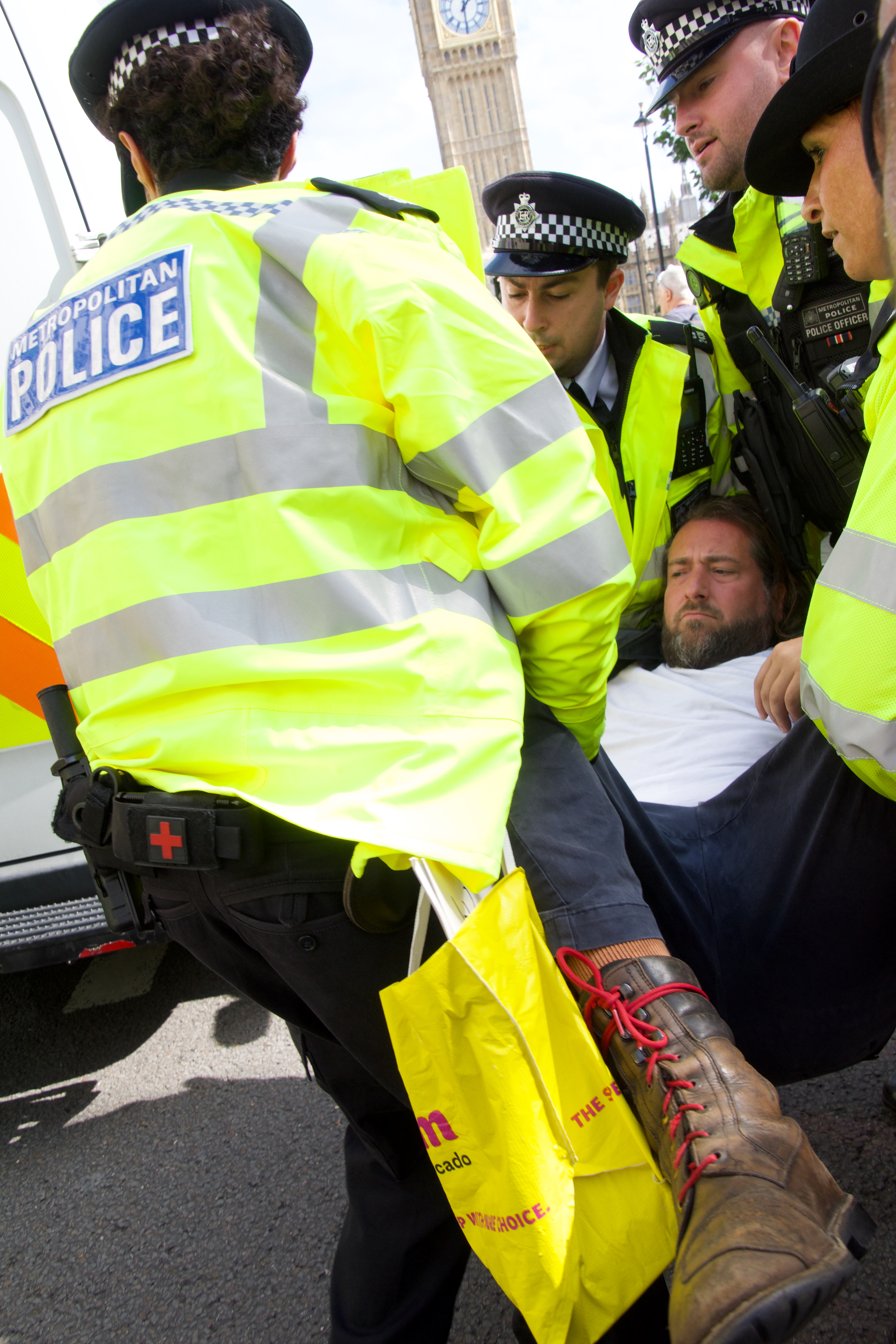
Police arresting a protester against the proscription in London, 6 September 2025

The decision to proscribe Palestine Action has been widely criticised by media and human rights groups. The Times opposed the proscription, regarding it as "unwise" to prosecute the group under anti-terrorism laws rather than criminal legislation. By classifying the group alongside the likes of Hamas and al-Qaeda, it said, the government risks promoting the perception that pro-Palestinian speech is being suppressed. The Guardian described the proscription as "an alarmingly illiberal overreaction" which conflates civil disobedience with terrorism, and called it a "disgrace" for non-violent protesters to be facing jail for expressions of support. The New York Times stated that the declassified intelligence report "undercuts some officials' broad claims" used to justify the proscription.

Lawyers for Palestine Action called the proposal "unlawful, dangerous and ill thought out". The proscription was criticised by experts from the United Nations, who said that acts intending to damage property but not to kill or injure people should not be labelled as terrorism, and noted that the move could have a "chilling effect" on political protest and "advocacy generally". Liberty, the civil liberties organisation, expressed concern regarding the precedent and propriety of the order. Amnesty International criticised the proscription as "unprecedented legal overreach", and said that UK's definition of terrorism was "overly broad" compared to similar legislation in other countries, and that the UK's anti-terrorism laws have given UK authorities the power to suppress free speech for years now. Further, Amnesty warned that by designating Palestine Action as a terrorist group, British authorities could next suppress freedom of speech of anyone caught expressing support for the group.

In 2025, several UK news publishers and journalists were concerned about the restrictions when they write about these topics. Owen Jones wrote in The Guardian: "This column does not express support for Palestine Action – here's why ... This piece must be carefully written to avoid my being imprisoned for up to 14 years. That's a curious sentence to say as a newspaper columnist in Britain in 2025." In September 2025, Defence Secretary John Healey said he expected newly appointed Home Secretary Shabana Mahmood to be "just as tough" as Yvette Cooper on Palestine Action. Mahmood abstained from the vote to proscribe Palestine Action as a terrorist group. In November 2025, The Guardian reported that a member of the Home Office homeland security group, who requested anonymity, had warned that the anti-terrorism Prevent programme risked being overwhelmed by the ban. He was particularly concerned many young people who did not understand the law could be referred into the Prevent programme. His concerns reflected those that independent Prevent reviewer Lord David Anderson had raised in the House of Lords pre-proscription debate.

The same month as The Guardian's report, the Independent Commission on Counter-Terrorism chaired by Declan Morgan, former Lord Chief Justice of Northern Ireland, recommended, among other changes, narrowing the definition of terrorism to "serious risk to life, national security, or public safety, or involving arson, explosives, or firearms". It stated that the current definition of terrorism is too broad, creating "uncertainty and overreach in its application", and that the criminalisation of support for proscribed groups "can create confusion, deter lawful civic engagement, and strain relations with communities connected to affected organisations – particularly where banned groups also pursue political objectives". According to The New Statesman, these recommendations were widely interpreted as an implicit criticism of the proscription of Palestine Action.

=== Legal challenge ===
Palestine Action dissolved following the ban, but its supporters and former members continued to take legal action to reverse its proscription. Huda Ammori challenged the designation in the High Court on 4 July. Their call for a temporary block was denied, but the application to consider a judicial review to quash the proscription order was granted a hearing on 21 July. On 30 July the High Court granted permission for a judicial review to be heard in November on two grounds (a) of a failure to consult and (b) that the proscription breaches the rights to free expression, association and assembly under the Human Rights Act 1998, but denying Judicial Review on six other grounds. The Secretary of State for the Home Department appealed against this decision to grant a Judicial Review. The appeal was heard on 25 September 2025, along with a cross appeal on behalf of Huda Ammori seeking to allow more of her original eight grounds for opposing proscription to be considered at Judicial Review. The judgement on these appeals was given on 17 October, with the government losing its appeal and Huda Ammori being allowed two more grounds to be considered at judicial review: (1) whether the Home Secretary failed to follow her own policy, and (2) the factors she considered when making her decision. Any eventual revocation of the group's proscription was described as potentially leading to the release of numerous detained individuals.

One week before the challenge was set to be heard, Mr. Justice Chamberlain, who had granted Ammori permission to appeal against the proscription, was removed from the case without explanation and replaced by a panel of three new judges - Dame Victoria Sharp, Mrs Justice Steyn and Mr Justice Swift. This alteration was implemented without any provided rationale, and several campaigners including Defend Our Juries and the Campaign Against Arms Trade raised concerns over the decision, noting that Justices Steyn and Swift had historically ruled in favour of government interests and that Dame Sharp's brother, Richard Sharp, was reported to have financial interests in companies targeted by Palestine Action.

A three-day hearing on the case began at the High Court on 26 November 2025, with Ammori's lawyer, Raza Husain, describing the proscription as "repugnant to the tradition of the common law" and "an unprecedented and disproportionate interference" with Articles 9, 10, and 11 of the European Convention on Human Rights. Two human rights advocacy groups, Amnesty International and Liberty, were granted permission to intervene in the case and make submissions arguing for the proscription to be quashed. Submissions were also made by Ben Saul, the United Nations special rapporteur on counter-terrorism, who stated that the majority of Palestine Action's members "do not contribute in any way to property damage by other members, let alone 'terrorism' which, if properly defined, the group has not committed". Irish writer Sally Rooney provided the court with a witness statement claiming that the ban could result in her books being withdrawn from sale in Britain, as she had pledged support for Palestine Action and it would thus be illegal for Faber & Faber (Rooney's British publishers) and the BBC (which had adapted two of Rooney's books for television) to pay her royalties if it was suspected she would use the money to support the group. On 2 December 2025, the final day of the hearing, the courtroom was closed to the public so that government lawyers could present confidential evidence outside of the presence of journalists. Ammori's legal team was also required to leave the courtroom, with Ammori represented by a "special advocate" (who was not permitted to inform Ammori of the nature of the evidence) in their absence. Following this evidence, the hearing concluded with final submissions from Ammori's legal team.

The High Court delivered its judgement on 13 February 2026, finding in a unanimous decision that the proscription of Palestine Action was unlawful. Two of Ammori's grounds for review were found to be valid: that the ban was contrary to the Human Rights Act, and that the Home Secretary had failed to apply her own policy. In their decision, the judges described Palestine Action as "an organisation that promotes its political cause through criminality" and found that "a very small number of its actions have amounted to terrorist action". However, they considered that the decision to proscribe the group was a disproportionate interference with its supporters' rights to freedom of expression and freedom of association. They also noted that members of the group involved in its criminal actions could still be prosecuted under other statutes. Despite the ruling, the ban on Palestine Action remained in force, with the High Court delaying their order quashing the proscription to allow the government time to appeal. Another hearing in the Supreme Court is scheduled for November 2026.

The government had spent £700,000 defending the proscription during the judicial review.

=== Government appeal ===
In the immediate aftermath of the decision, Shabana Mahmood announced that the Home Office would contest the ruling at the Court of Appeal. On 25 February Mahmood was given leave to appeal by the High Court. At the same hearing, Ammori requested permission to cross-appeal in order to argue the grounds rejected in the original decision: the judges refused her request. The appeal was scheduled to begin on 28 April 2026, with a verdict returned on 15 June 2026.

In advance of the appeal's opening, an open letter defying the proscription and signed by more than 1000 people was to be delivered to the court on 28 April. The letter read simply, "We oppose genocide, we support Palestine Action", a statement which exposes the signatories to prosecution, and prominent signatories include "Judith Butler, musician Brian Eno, Israeli professors Ilan Pappé and Avi Shlaim, author and anti-apartheid campaigner Andrew Feinstein, and Massive Attack frontman Robert Del Naja".

On 15 June, a panel of five judges at the Court of Appeal overturned the High Court's decision and ruled that the proscription of Palestine Action as a terrorist group was lawful. Delivering the verdict, Chief Justice Baroness Sue Carr said that "Palestine Action overtly promoted unlawful violence amounting to terrorism", under the UK government's definition, and "at no stage has Palestine Action suggested that its terrorist activities were either a mistake or an aberration". She added that their campaigning was "intended to close down lawful businesses", adding that "future threats and risks posed to third-party individuals and property by Palestine Action were perhaps the most important factors to weigh in the balance", they therefore "concluded that the proscription decision struck a fair balance". Lawyers for Palestine Action had previously likened the group to the suffragettes, noting that the suffragettes "had resorted to direct action, property damage and even attempted arson at Westminster Abbey," and arguing that the "votes-for-women movement" would have faced the same ban, if today's terrorism laws had been in place more than 100 years ago. Carr denied this, saying that Palestine Action was "a covert organisation that operates using secret cells to avoid the detection and prosecution of those using violence to destroy the property of third parties", not "as it claims, a direct action civil disobedience group like the suffragettes". This was criticised by Owen Jones and Middle East Eye as a form of historical revisionism, noting that the suffragettes contained a secret cell in later years (known as the Young Hot Bloods).

Responding to the "lawful business" statement, former government lawyer Tim Crosland said the judgement was "based on a completely false legal premise that Elbit Systems is a lawful business" and that "the reason for Palestine Action's existence is stopping drones getting to the Israeli forces to be used to kill Palestinians in violation of international law". Ammori commented that "they acted as if Elbit were Tesco" and that the verdict was "an insult to every single Palestinian Israel massacred in Gaza, every Palestinian who has lost their home, every health worker attacked because of Elbit's weapons. It is clear that Palestine Action aimed at shutting down the Israeli weapons industry, that is the opposite of terrorism". She also said the proscription was "one of the most extreme attacks on free speech and the right to protest in modern British history".

Amnesty International condemned the ruling, saying "The banning of Palestine Action as a terrorist organisation is a grave misuse of counter-terrorism powers with serious consequences for human rights". Defend Our Juries, who have organised many actions in defiance of the ban, said they were surprised, writing in a statement that "It appears the courts have been instrumentalised to suppress opposition to genocide, when they should be doing the precise opposite". They signalled their intention to continue to protest against "this Government’s embarrassing attempts to cover up its crimes with mafia state intimidation tactics."

=== Further appeals ===
Following the Court of Appeal's ruling, Ammori vowed to "fight proscription all the way" and pursue her case through every available avenue. On 30 July 2026, she was granted leave to appeal against the decision to the Supreme Court of the United Kingdom, the highest appeal court in the nation. The appeal is expected to be heard between October and December 2026. As a result of the appeal, all criminal cases involving Palestine Action were delayed until 26 October.

=== Aftermath ===
Current Affairs described the proscription of Palestine Action as a counterpart to the Trump administration's September 2025 National Security Presidential Memorandum-7 (NSPM-7), which designated the anti-fascist movement antifa as a domestic terrorist organisation in the United States.

=== United States proscription ===
On 26 August 2026, the US Treasury Department designated Palestine Action a Specially Designated Global Terrorist and imposed sanctions on it. The action was part of the country's counterterrorism efforts to crack down on left-wing groups including Autistici Inventati and Masar Badil. The Office of Foreign Assets Control stated that the group had "materially assisted, sponsored or provided financial, material or technological support for, or goods and services to or in support of, an act of terrorism." The Treasury department said that the group “promoted its violent, criminal and terrorist acts on social media, encouraging the use of similar tactics internationally, including within the United States and along the US-Mexican border”.

The chief of the Office of the United Nations High Commissioner for Human Rights, Volker Türk, condemned the action, stating that the terrorist designation by the US was "a disproportionate and unnecessary restriction" on freedom of speech.

Israel's Ministry of Foreign Affairs praised the designation, stating on X: "Organizations have systematically exploited Western civil society, using political and humanitarian pretenses to mask violent operations, radicalize youth, and channel illicit funding".

== Defiance of proscription ==
Arrests for support to Palestine Action
Date	Count	Source
5 July 2025	29	
12 July 2025	at least 70	
19 July 2025	at least 100	
9–10 August 2025	521	
16 August 2025	13	
6 September 2025	890	
4 October 2025	488	
18 November 2025	142	
23 November 2025	90	
29 November 2025	100	
25 January 2026	86	
28 March 2026	18	
11 April 2026	523	
15 June 2026	117	
30 July 2026	77	
Total	at least 3,264	

A new direct action protest group emerged in response to the decision to proscribe Palestine Action, calling itself "Yvette Cooper" after the home secretary responsible for deciding to proscribe Palestine Action. It targeted the Birmingham firm, Time Logistics, which it said transports weapons for Elbit Systems, and investment firm BNY Mellon, which it said holds shares in Elbit Systems.

=== Arrests ===
On 5 July 2025, 29 people were arrested during a demonstration in London supporting the now-proscribed group. One of those arrested was Rev Sue Parfitt, an 83-year-old retired priest. As of 7 July 2025, those arrested had been released on bail. Defend Our Juries, which organised the protest, said protests are spreading across the rest of Europe outside British Embassies in the Netherlands and Denmark, with dozens of protesters arrested. On 12 July 2025, protests against the proscription were held in Derry, Kendal, London, Manchester and Cardiff, with at least 70 arrests for showing support for Palestine Action: 13 in Cardiff, 16 in Manchester, 41 arrests in London. Many were quietly holding signs reading "I oppose genocide. I support Palestine Action". Police action varied markedly, with no arrests in Kendal or Derry, while police in Cardiff responded to similar cardboard signs with arrests on much more serious charges and searches of protesters houses. Separately, one person was arrested in the area of the London protest for common assault.

On 19 July, over 100 were arrested following protests in support of Palestine Action in London, Edinburgh, Manchester, Bristol and Truro. On 25 July, the United Nations' human rights chief, Volker Turk, urged the UK government to lift the ban on Palestine Action, calling the proscription a "disturbing" misuse of counter-terrorism legislation, as well as "disproportionate and unnecessary". On 9 August 2025, a large demonstration in support of the group took place at Parliament Square in London. The Metropolitan Police estimated that between 500 and 600 people were in attendance when the protest began. When Big Ben chimed 1 p.m. during the protest, large numbers of demonstrators revealed signs which read "I oppose genocide. I support Palestine Action", leading to the arrest of 466 people—the largest made by the Met on a single day in the previous 10 years. Among those detained was former Guantanamo Bay detainee and activist Moazzam Begg. An additional eight people were arrested for other offences: five for assaulting police officers, two for public order offences, and one for a racially aggravated offence. Amnesty International described the large number of arrests as "deeply concerning". On 10 August, the number of people arrested during the weekend rose to 532.

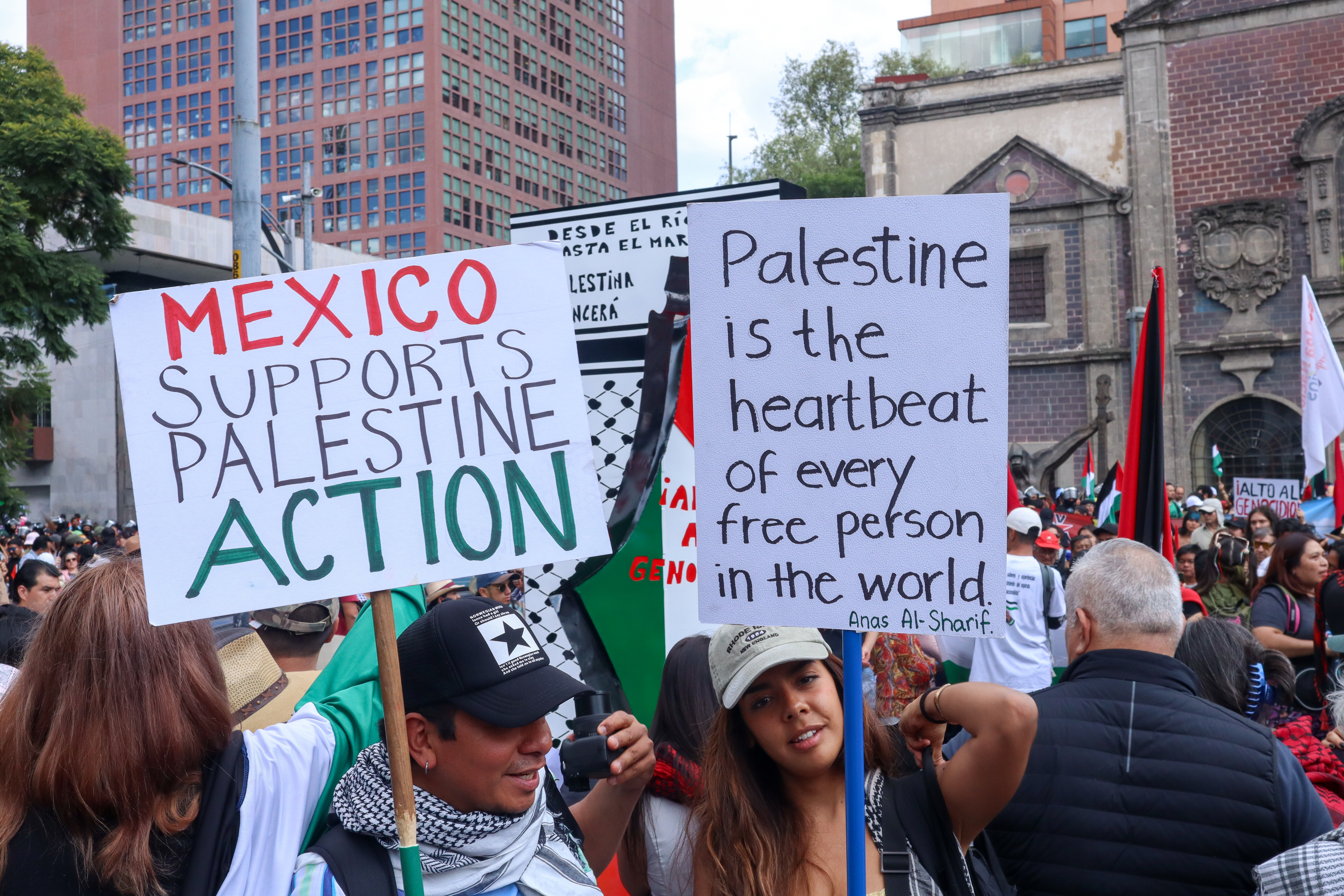
Solidarity with Palestine Action in Mexico City, 17 August 2025

On 16 August 2025, 13 people were arrested at a protest supporting the group outside City Hall, Norwich. Writing in the Irish Times, author Sally Rooney pledged continuing support for Palestine Action, despite the group's proscription in the UK. In August 2025, screenwriter Paul Laverty was arrested in Edinburgh for wearing a T-shirt that was alleged to support Palestine Action. The T-shirt displayed the words: "Genocide in Palestine, time to take Action". 6 September saw another rally in London expressing support, with almost 900 arrests taking place: 857 for support of the group, and 33 for other offences, with 17 of those for assault of a police officer. On 4 October 2025, at least 493 more people have been arrested in central London during protests in support of Palestine Action, according to the Metropolitan Police.

On 15 October, court proceeding began, with 28 defendants standing accused from among some 2,100 cases expected to need processing. Under the court's plan for trying all defendants, there would be two trials per day with five defendants appearing in each trial. Based on there being over 2,000 defendants, it was estimated that this would require at least 400 trials over 200 full days of court time. On 18 November, Defend Our Juries reported that about 142 people were arrested by police in England and Wales on the first day of coordinated protests organised by the DOJ against the UK government's proscription of the group. On 29 November, dozens of protestors were arrested in various locations across England; 31 in Bristol city centre, 30 at College Green, Bristol, 34 at St Peter's Square in Manchester, 25 in Birmingham, and 10 in Norwich. On 17 December, Amnesty International reported that there had been over 600 arrests during the period from 18 to 29 November, which takes the total arrests to date to over 2,700. On 25 January 2026, 86 people were arrested after police suspected that protesters breached the grounds of HM Prison Wormwood Scrubs in London to show support of a Palestine Action hunger striker.

Following the High Court's finding that the proscription was unlawful, the Metropolitan Police confirmed its officers would no longer be making arrests in connection with Palestine Action, but would continue to gather evidence. However, the force revised its position on 25 March and stated that it would resume arrests of Palestine Action supporters pending the outcome of the government's appeal. Subsequently, eighteen people were arrested for supporting Palestine Action during a protest outside New Scotland Yard on 28 March, and over 500 were arrested in central London on 11 April. When the Court of Appeal upheld the proscription on 15 June, more than 100 demonstrators were arrested at a protest outside the Royal Courts of Justice. On 30 July 2026, 77 arrests were made during a demonstration outside Westminster Magistrates' Court where defendants accused of offences related to Palestine Action were due to have their cases heard, all but four of which were on charges of expressing support for a proscribed organisation.

On Saturday 31 October 2026, the Metropolitan Police said at least 139 people had been arrested during protests against the ban on Palestine Action — up from the 48 arrests it had reported earlier the same day. Most of those detained were arrested for "expressing support for a proscribed organisation," according to the force. Hundreds gathered outside the US Embassy in London to oppose the ban, which came into effect in July 2025 under then prime minister Keir Starmer. The rally was held days before a Supreme Court appeal challenging the proscription. At a similar protest in Edinburgh on the same day, Police Scotland made no arrests.

=== Charges and legal proceedings ===
The protests in July alone resulted in more people charged under section 13 terrorism offences than had been charged during the entire "war on terror". Until these Defend Our Juries protests, since the 2000 Terrorism act was introduced, just 34 people had been charged, and 23 people had been convicted, under a section 13 offence.

== Post-Proscription Palestine-related direct actions ==
=== "Moog 4" Protest ===
In November 2024, Campaign Against Arms Trade cited the Wolverhampton factory of Moog Inc., a US arms company, as one of a number of UK arms companies that was involved in the supply chain for Israel's F-35 fighter jet programme. In July 2025, investigative outlet Declassified UK reported that Moog had sent multiple shipments from its Wolverhampton facility to Hatzerim Airbase in Israel. According to the report, the consignments were addressed to the M-346 "Lavi" trainer aircraft programme, which is used by the Israeli Air Force to train pilots for frontline aircraft including the F-16 and F-35. The report noted that the UK government's September 2024 suspension of certain arms export licences to Israel did not extend to trainer aircraft, and argued that this distinction enabled continuing support for Israel's pilot training infrastructure.

On 26 August 2025, four pro-Palestinian protesters calling themselves Palestinian Martyrs' Justice entered the Wolverhampton facility of Moog Inc. and occupied the roof of a building. Prosecutors alleged that the defendants caused damage to the site, including to roof structures and skylights. The protesters said that they had targeted the facility because of Moog's production of components for military aircraft used by Israel.

Four people were charged with criminal damage and were remanded in custody for six months before being released on bail. In September and October 2025, Moog also obtained a High Court injunction restricting protest activity at several of its United Kingdom facilities.

The first criminal trial began at Birmingham Crown Court in June 2026. On 18 June, after more than 17 hours of deliberation, the jury was unable to return verdicts on which the required majority could agree and was discharged. The Crown Prosecution Service subsequently confirmed that it would seek a retrial, which was scheduled for March 2027.

=== People Against Genocide ===
A group naming itself "People Against Genocide" (PAG) has claimed responsibility for many of the direct actions which have taken place since Palestine Action was proscribed, targeting both Elbit as well as firms alleged to be supplying Elbit, such as Keysight Technology.

==== Keysight Technology ====
On 12 November 2 activists from People Against Genocide staged a rooftop protest at Keysight's headquarters in Winnersh, Berkshire, unfurling a banner which read "UK: Stop Arming Israel". This was followed by another action by the same group at the same site on 21 January 2026, when 3 protesters sprayed Keysight logistics vans with black paint. On 12 April, three PAG activists broke into the Research and Development facility of Keysight in Fleet, Hampshire, allegedly damaging computers and spraying red paint. They were charged with aggravated burglary and criminal damage, with one defendant also charged with assaulting an emergency worker.

==== UAV Tactical Systems ====
On the morning of 24 April 2026, protesters from People Against Genocide accessed the roof of a factory in Leicestershire owned by Elbit UK's subsidiary UAV Tactical Systems. They broke into the roof and abseiled into the clean room of the factory; it was reported that such contamination to the room where drone parts were assembled could put it out of action for some months. One person involved was quoted as saying, "We are sick and tired of our government’s collaboration in this genocide that Israel is committing on the Palestinian people. We know that genocide has no place in this world - so that’s why we’re here to shut Elbit down."

==== HSBC ====
On 12–13 December 2025 there was a coordinated series of actions targeting HSBC for its investments in Elbit. Bank branches at Catford, Lewisham, Ilford, Tottenham Court Road, Fulham, Birmingham, Wokingham, Brighton, Newcastle, Edinburgh, and Glasgow were targeted and the actions taken included shattering windows and dousing buildings in red paint. The group People Against Genocide released the following statement: "By taking direct action and costing HSBC, we are making investing in genocide unprofitable. It’s now not only the ethical decision, but it’s also financially strategic to pull all shares out of Elbit Systems. Our actions were taken in solidarity with the Palestinian people, and the prisoners for Palestine hunger strikers, who are calling for Elbit to be shut down." In the fourth quarter of 2025, HSBC had increased its shareholdings in Elbit Systems Ltd from 12,826 to 16,317 shares, worth $8,318,407 at a September 2025 valuation.

==== Chubb Insurance ====
Further actions targeted Chubb Insurance offices in Manchester and London for their supplying insurance to Elbit subsidiary UAV Engines in Shenstone, Staffordshire. A statement issued after a lock-on and paint protest on 30 March 2026 stated, "We are here to shut down Chubb, the insurers of Elbit Systems, until they cut all ties."

== See also ==
- United Kingdom and the Gaza war
- R v Saibene — British trial pertaining to a direct action against an EDO armaments factory
- EDO MBM Technology Ltd v Campaign to Smash EDO – Civil legal action against anti-war protesters
- Fairford Five – British anti-war protest group
- Pitstop Ploughshares – Group of anti-war activists
- Trident Ploughshares – Anti-nuclear weapons group
- Seeds of Hope – English plowshares group
- Unity of Fields – Pro-Palestinian protest network
- Ulm 5 – German pro-Palestine direct action group
