= Frances Judd =

British judge

The Honourable Mrs Justice Judd DBE
- Royal coat of arms of the United Kingdom

Justice of the High Court
- Incumbent
- Assumed office 3 September 2019

Personal details
- Born: 13 February 1961 (age 65) United Kingdom
- Education: New Hall, Cambridge

Dame Frances Jean Judd, DBE (born 13 February 1961) is a British High Court judge.

== Early life and education ==
Judd was educated at The King's School in Canterbury. She studied history at New Hall, Cambridge, completing a BA in 1982.

== Career ==
Following university, she was called to the bar at Middle Temple in 1984, practising family law; she was head of chambers at Harcourt Chambers from 2009 to 2018. She was an associate member of St John's Chambers. Judd served as a recorder from 2002 to 2019, took silk in 2006 and was appointed a deputy High Court judge in 2011. She was chair of the Family Law Bar Association in 2018. In addition to practice, Judd jointly wrote Contact: The New Deal in 2006 and Relocation: a practical guide in 2013.

=== High Court appointment ===
On 3 September 2019, Judd was appointed a judge of the High Court and assigned to the Family Division. She took the customary damehood in the same year.

In 2020, Judd was found to have made derogatory remarks about a mother to a clerk in a care proceedings case after forgetting to mute herself on a Zoom call, suggesting the mother was pretending to have a cough; Judd's refusal to recuse herself following the comments led to her ruling being overturned by the Court of Appeal and the case was remitted to the High Court's Family Division for another judge to hear the case.
