= Insulate Britain protests =

2021 climate change protests in Britain

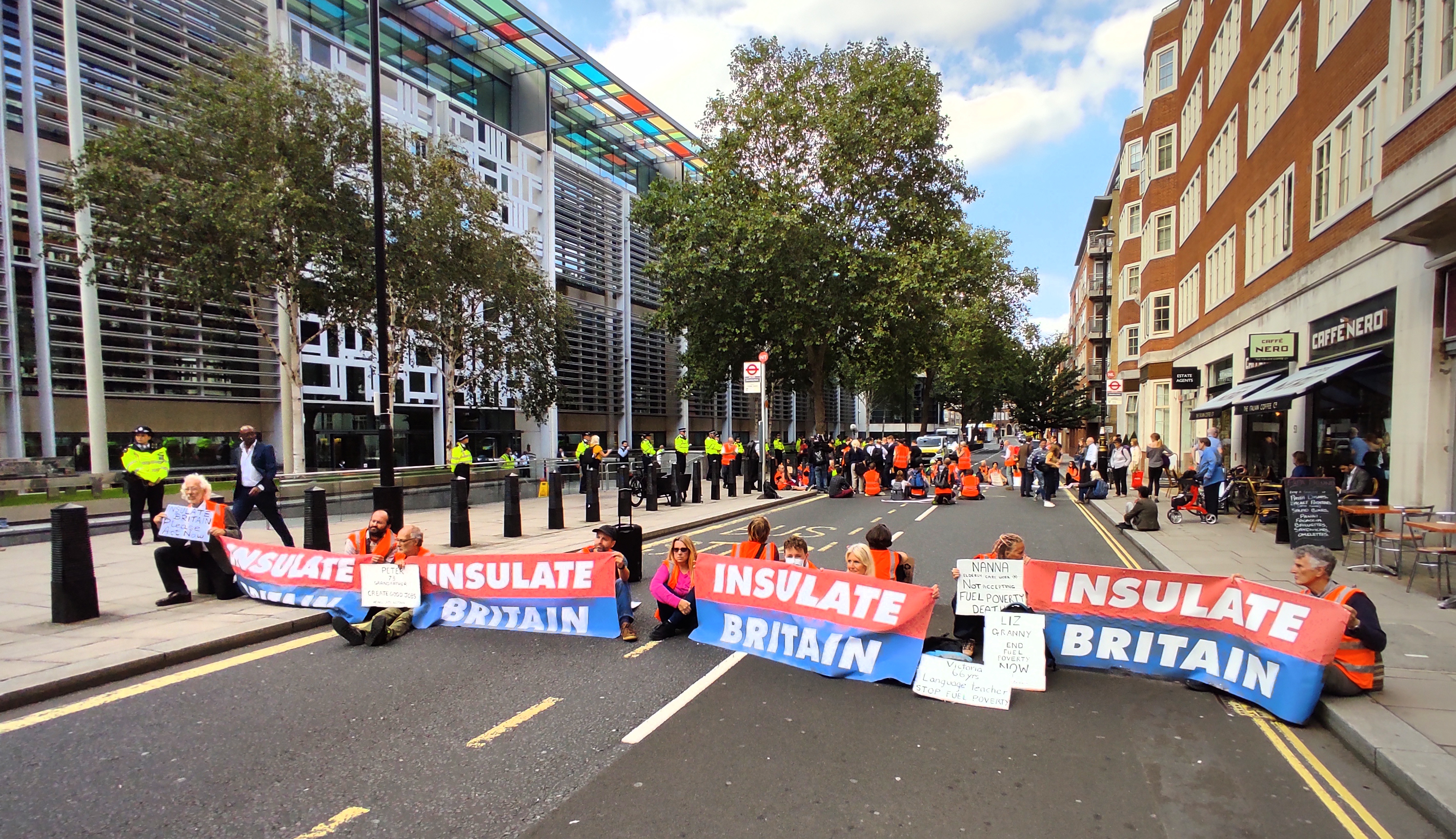
- Insulate Britain hold a press conference outside the Home Office, London (22 September 2021)
- Date: 13 September 2021 – 4 November 2021
- Location: Birmingham, London, M25 motorway, Manchester, Port of Dover
- Goals: Government-funded nationwide home insulation
- Methods: Traffic obstruction, civil disobedience
- Status: Ended; self-declared failure
- Result: Self-declared failure of protests

A series of protests by the group Insulate Britain involving traffic obstruction began on 13 September 2021. The group blockaded the M25 and other motorways in the United Kingdom, and roads in London and the Port of Dover.

The protesters demanded that the government improve the insulation of all social housing in the UK by 2025 and retrofit all homes with improved insulation by 2030. Improved insulation of homes would likely reduce the use of fuel, such as natural gases and oil, and adjust the internal temperature, thus improving energy efficiency in British housing and mitigating climate change.

The group has drawn support from some, and condemnation from others including individuals within the government.

On 17 November 2021, nine protesters were imprisoned for breaching an injunction against road blockade protests. On 2 February 2022, five protesters were imprisoned for the same reason, with eleven others receiving suspended sentences.

== Background ==
Insulate Britain is an environmental activist group, founded by six members of the global environmental movement Extinction Rebellion. Their methods slightly differ from that of Extinction Rebellion, but they share the same overall target: to reduce the rate of climate change. The group began hosting both online and in-person events in July 2021, also raising money for direct action. They use civil disobedience as a tactic.

Founded with the aim of demanding insulation across the United Kingdom, the group laid out two specific demands for its September 2021 protests. The first is that the British government fund insulation of all social housing by 2025, and the second is that, by the end of 2021, the government must create a plan to fund retrofitting of insulation of all homes in Britain by 2030. Insulate Britain created a Parliament petition for the first demand. According to The Guardian, the group's demands are in line with consensus among climate scientists and policy experts that home insulation—including when retrofitted—is an environmental priority, saves money to occupants and is beneficial to the economy.

== Protests ==
The protests began on 13 September 2021, when protesters sat in roads at five junctions (Junctions 3, 6, 14, 20 and 31) on the M25 motorway, followed by further protests on 15, 17, 20, 21 and 23 September.

In an escalation of the protests, activists blocked the main carriageway of the M25 in both directions between junctions 9 and 10 on 21 September. Protesters walked out onto both sides of the motorway from junction 10. Thirty-eight protesters were arrested for various offenses, such as criminal damage, causing danger to road users, willful obstruction of the highway and causing a public nuisance.

On 24 September, the group blockaded the Port of Dover. Several protesters were arrested.

On 29 September, protesters blocked the M25 again near junction 3. The protest started around 7:30am but by 8:53am the police had put out a tweet stating that the section of the M25 had been reopened. During the protests, activists glued themselves to the slip roads of targeted motorway exits or to live lanes of the motorway, making them inaccessible to vehicles. The protesters also poured paint onto sections of the carriageway.

Further protests took place on 1 October with disruption to the M1 and M4 motorways. Thirty-nine protesters were arrested.

On 4 October, Insulate Britain protesters blocked the Blackwall Tunnel, on the A102 which connects the London boroughs of Tower Hamlets and Greenwich in London. Thirty-eight protesters were arrested. The group suspended its protests on 14 October, saying that Boris Johnson, the Prime Minister of the UK, had 11 days to make "a meaningful or trustworthy statement" or else the protests would resume.

The protests resumed on 25 October, with 61 activists blocking roads at the London locations Upper Thames Street, Bishopsgate and Limehouse Causeway.

During morning rush hour of 2 November, the group blocked the M56 and A538 near Manchester Airport and the A4400 in Birmingham.

The group's last road protest to date took place on 4 November, when sixty-two protesters blocked roads around Parliament Square.

== Aftermath ==
On 7 February 2022 the group self-declared "with a heavy heart" that the series of protests had failed in their aim to force the government into taking action.

Since November 2021 a number of those arrested have been sentenced to prison; including nine in November 2021 and five in February 2022. In March 2023, a further Insulate Britain protester was jailed for five weeks for causing a nuisance to the public.

In response to actions by Insulate Britain and other groups such as Just Stop Oil the UK government has announced its aim to pass through a series of new measures to restrict the ability for groups to disrupt national infrastructure as a form of protest.

== Reaction ==
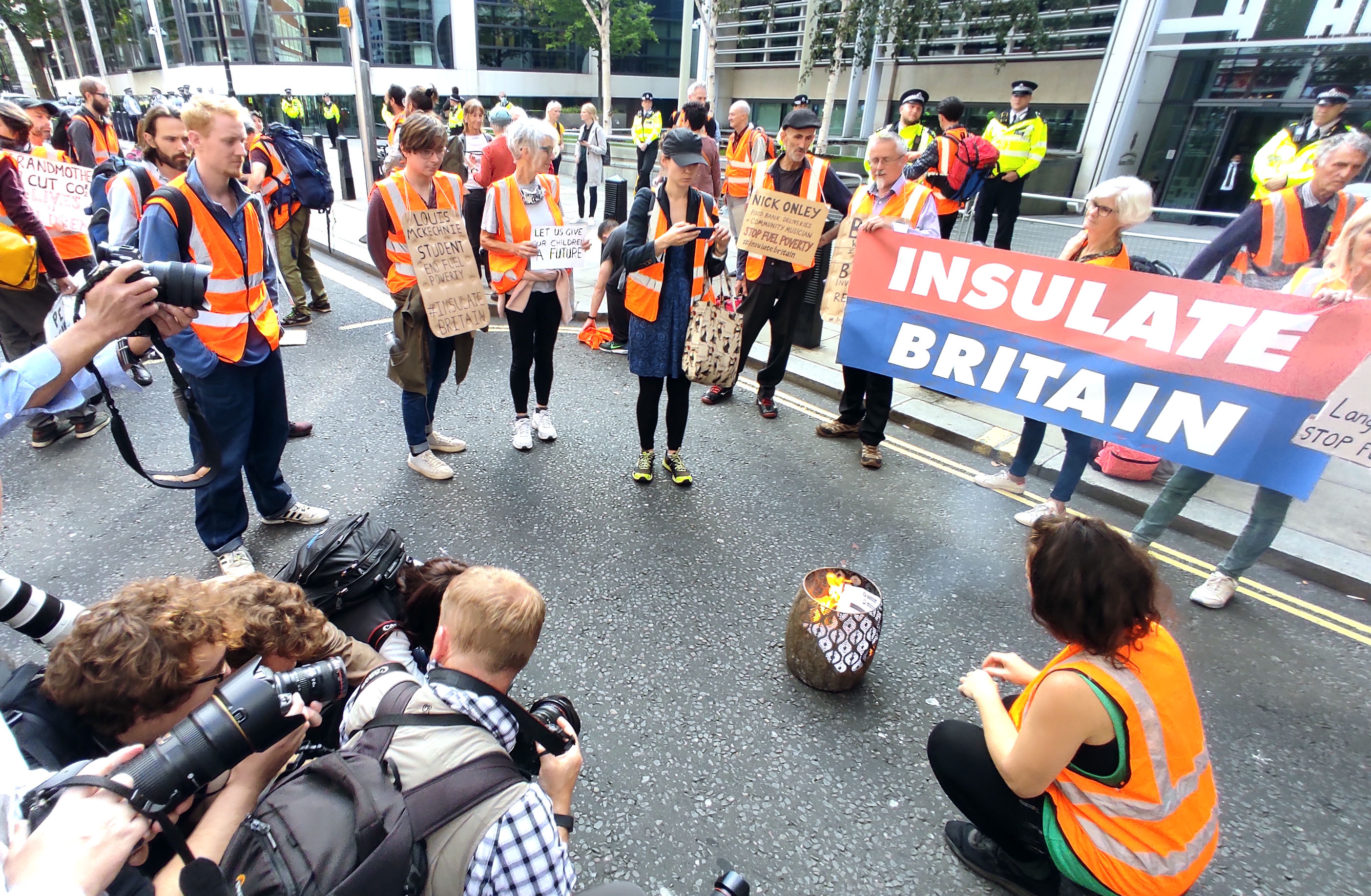
Insulate Britain burn police release letters outside the Home Office, London (22 September 2021)

An injunction effective on 22 September 2021 and lasting to 21 March 2022 was granted to National Highways. The injunction prohibited demonstrators from "causing damage to the surface of or to any apparatus on or around the M25 including but not limited to painting, damaging by fire, or affixing any item or structure thereto". Protesters who break the injunction will be in contempt of court, which could result in a prison sentence of up to two years or an unlimited fine. However, Insulate Britain figures told The Guardian that they believed an injunction, prosecutions and other legal actions were being delayed by the government until after 2021 United Nations Climate Change Conference (COP26). A spokesperson said: "We know that our government and institutions purport that we live in a democracy, so they don't want to have 50–100 climate protesters on remand when [the conference] starts". On 17 November 2021, nine protesters were imprisoned: one for six months, six for four months and one for three months. Emma Smart, one of the protestors imprisoned, started a hunger strike after sentencing and was moved to the hospital wing of HMP Bronzefield on the 13th day of her strike.

Figures within the British government, including the Home Secretary Priti Patel, Transport Secretary Grant Shapps and Prime Minister Boris Johnson condemned the protesters' actions. The protests are supported by Green Party MP Caroline Lucas, and House of Lords members Natalie Bennett and Jenny Jones. On 4 October, Johnson said that Insulate Britain, who were not "legitimate protesters", were "irresponsible crusties". At the 2021 Conservative Party Conference, Patel announced increased penalties for motorway disruptions, criminalisation of infrastructure disruption and "stop and search" powers for the police. Patel named Insulate Britain specifically in her announcement. The Guardian opposed this policy as it would "remove even more rights from political protesters". In an interview, Prince Charles, the heir to the British throne, stated he totally understood the frustration shown by the Extinction Rebellion and Insulate Britain protesters, but added that it should be directed "in a way that is more constructive rather than destructive", as their current methods are not "helpful" and only alienate people.

Politics academics Oscar Berglund and Graeme Hayes supported the protests in The Conversation, agreeing with Insulate Britain's aims as "an essential part of lowering Britain's emissions". They quoted research that concluded that protesters who "inconvenience others" are more likely to achieve change, arguing that "broad popularity isn't all that relevant". Providing counterarguments against criticism, the writers said that motorway traffic and disruption that "hurts vulnerable people" is an everyday phenomenon, and that "it is unlikely that people will be against insulating homes just because they get annoyed at protesters".

Opinion polling conducted by YouGov from 5–6 October 2021 found that 72% of those surveyed opposed the protesters' actions, with 18% supporting the actions and 10% that did not know.

== See also ==
- Energy efficiency in British housing
