= Patrick Field (judge) =

British Circuit judge

Patrick John Field KC (born 19 March 1959) is a British Circuit judge, styled His Honour Judge Patrick Field KC.

== Career ==
He was educated at Wilmslow County Grammar School and King's College London (LLB). He was called to the bar at Gray's Inn in 1981 and worked as a barrister at Deans Court Chambers where he took silk.

He served as a Recorder from 2001 to 2012, before being appointed to the Northern Circuit on 16 July 2012. Judge Field also serves on the Criminal Procedure Rule Committee. This committee is responsible for making new Criminal Procedure Rules and simplifying the existing rules with the aim of making the criminal justice system as accessible, fair and efficient as possible and ensuring that the rules are simply worded and easy to understand.

== Notable cases ==
Judge Field has presided over the following recent notable cases:

- Nevey Smith et al. Manchester disorder cases (2024)
- Murder of Jesse Lloyd-Smith (2025)
- Filton / Palestine Action direct action (2026)

=== Nevey Smith et al. Manchester disorder cases (2024) ===
During the July 2024 riots across the United Kingdom, one episode of violent disorder took place outside a hotel used by asylum seekers in Newton Heath, Manchester. Judge Field presided over a number of the trials of those involved. One case in particular involved a grandmother, Vanessa Smith, her daughter Nevey Smith and the daughter's 20-month old son. Both pleaded guilty to violent disorder. Nevey Smith was given a suspended sentence and community order.

=== Murder of Jesse Lloyd-Smith (2024) ===
Judge Field presided over the trial of Gabriel Charles, who had been charged for the murder of Jesse Lloyd-Smith in Peckham in July 2024. Lloyd-Smith had been shot in the head with a converted blank firing gun. He was the sister of footballer Lexi Lloyd-Smith, who plays for Bristol City in the Women’s Championship and England U23s.

Charles was found guilty and sentenced by Judge Field to life, with a minimum of 28 years.
