= List of High Court judges of England and Wales =

This is a list of justices of the High Court of Justice of England and Wales, the puisne judges of the court. They serve in addition to the High Court's ex officio members:

- Lady Chief Justice
- President of the King's Bench Division
- President of the Family Division
- Chancellor of the High Court
- Senior Presiding Judge
- Vice-President of the King's Bench Division

In addition to the justices, Masters of the High Court (King's Bench Masters, Chancery Masters, Taxing Masters/Costs Judges) and Insolvency and Companies Court Judges also form part of the judiciary of the High Court. Decisions of justices, masters and of Insolvency and Companies Court Judges are of equal standing, both types being judges of the High Court sitting at first instance.

On appointment, male justices are made Knights Bachelor, and female justices are made Dames Commander of the British Empire (DBE). In addition, all High Court judges are entitled to the judicial style Mr/Mrs/Ms Justice X.

The number of justices of the High Court is limited to 108, (Note: The Senior Courts Act 1981 specifies 80, but that has been amended (without changing the act's text) by The Maximum number of Judges Order 2003 to 108. High Court judges sitting on the European Court of Human Rights do not count against the total under the Human Rights Act 1998, and judges sitting on other courts are excluded by virtue of the Access to Justice Act 1999. Recently, this has applied to Nicolas Bratza in respect of the ECHR and Sir Adrian Fulford, who was serving on the International Criminal Court; at the time there were, therefore, 110 judges. Such seconded judges do not receive a salary as a judge of High Court.) and the Public Service Pensions and Judicial Offices Act 2022 mandates that they retire at 75.

== List of current judges ==
	Judge	Mandatory retirement	Date of appointment	Division	Role
1	Dame Lucy Theis	6 November 2035	15 November 2010	Family	
2	Sir Robert Hildyard	10 October 2027	3 October 2011	Business and Property	
3	Sir Mark Turner	27 August 2034	28 January 2013	King's Bench	
4	Sir Joseph Keehan	31 March 2035	14 May 2013	Family	
5	Sir Robert Jay	20 September 2034	4 June 2013	King's Bench	
6	Sir Anthony Hayden	24 June 2036	31 July 2013	Family	
7	Sir Robin Knowles	7 April 2035	1 October 2014	Business and Property	
8	Dame Maura McGowan	27 January 2032	1 October 2014	King's Bench	
9	Sir Alistair MacDonald	22 February 2045	2 June 2015	Family	
10	Sir Simon Picken	23 April 2041	8 June 2015	Business and Property	
11	Sir Neil Garnham	11 February 2034	5 November 2015	King's Bench	
12	Dame Parmjit-Kaur (Bobbie) Cheema-Grubb	6 October 2041	25 November 2015	King's Bench	
13	Dame Finola O'Farrell	15 December 2035	17 October 2016	Business and Property	
14	Sir Stephen Morris	18 May 2032	3 October 2016	King's Bench	
15	Dame Nerys Jefford	25 December 2037	3 October 2016	King's Bench	
16	Sir Nicholas Lavender	7 August 2039	3 October 2016	King's Bench	
17	Sir Andrew Baker	21 December 2040	1 November 2016	Business and Property	Judge in Charge of the Admiralty Court
18	Sir Marcus Smith	1 July 2042	12 January 2017	Business and Property	
19	Sir Simon Bryan	23 November 2040	2 October 2017	Business and Property	
20	Sir Julian Goose	26 July 2036	2 October 2017	King's Bench	
21	Sir Martin Spencer	19 June 2031	2 October 2017	King's Bench	
22	Sir Matthew Nicklin	16 October 2045	2 October 2017	King's Bench	
23	Sir Akhlaq Choudhury	23 April 2042	2 October 2017	King's Bench	
24	Dame Gwynneth Knowles	11 July 2037	2 October 2017	Family	
25	Sir David Williams	18 June 2039	2 October 2017	Family	
26	Dame Christina Lambert	15 August 2039	11 January 2018	King's Bench	Judge in Charge King's Bench civil list
27	Sir Richard Jacobs	21 December 2031	25 June 2018	King's Bench	
28	Sir David Waksman	28 August 2032	1 October 2018	Business and Property	Judge in Charge of the Commercial Court
29	Dame Johanna Cutts	12 January 2039	1 October 2018	King's Bench	
30	Sir Jonathan Swift	11 September 2039	1 October 2018	King's Bench	
31	Sir Edward Pepperall	26 December 2041	1 October 2018	King's Bench	
32	Sir Edward Murray	3 May 2033	1 October 2018	King's Bench	
33	Dame Judith Farbey	21 October 2040	1 October 2018	King's Bench	
34	Dame Justine Thornton	16 September 2045	25 February 2019	King's Bench	
35	Dame Frances Judd	13 February 2036	3 September 2019	Family	
36	Sir William Trower	28 December 2034	1 October 2019	Business and Property	
37	Dame Jennifer Eady	31 May 2040	1 October 2019	King's Bench	
38	Sir John Cavanagh	17 June 2035	1 October 2019	King's Bench	
39	Dame Alison Foster	22 January 2032	1 October 2019	King's Bench	
40	Sir Martin Griffiths	27 April 2037	1 October 2019	King's Bench	
41	Sir Pushpinder Saini	26 February 2043	1 October 2019	King's Bench	
42	Sir Jeremy Johnson	May 2046	1 October 2019	King's Bench	
43	Sir Martin Chamberlain	25 November 2048	1 October 2019	King's Bench	Judge in charge of the Administrative Court
44	Dame Karen Steyn	20 October 2045	1 October 2019	King's Bench	Judge in charge of the Media and Communications list
45	Sir Nicholas Hilliard	1 May 2034	18 November 2019	King's Bench	
46	Sir Andrew Henshaw	22 April 2037	2 December 2019	Business and Property	
47	Dame Amanda Tipples	18 December 2041	2 December 2019	King's Bench	
48	Sir Michael Fordham	21 December 2039	13 January 2020	King's Bench	
49	Sir Thomas Linden	26 November 2039	13 January 2020	King's Bench	
50	Sir Robert Miles	29 November 2037	21 April 2020	Business and Property	
51	Sir Neil Calver	4 September 2038	1 October 2020	Business and Property	
52	Sir Adam Johnson	4 October 2040	1 October 2020	Business and Property	
53	Dame Kelyn Bacon	29 October 2048	1 October 2020	Business and Property	President of the Competition Appeal Tribunal
54	Sir Mark Wall	4 March 2038	1 October 2020	King's Bench	
55	Dame Mary Stacey	15 May 2036	1 October 2020	King's Bench	
56	Sir Charles Bourne	4 July 2039	1 October 2020	King's Bench	
57	Dame Rowena Collins Rice	24 April 2035	1 October 2020	King's Bench	
58	Sir Nigel Poole	10 November 2040	1 October 2020	Family	
59	Sir Robert Peel	29 January 2041	6 October 2020	Family	National Lead Judge of the Financial Remedies Court
60	Sir Michael Green	23 October 2039	2 November 2020	Business and Property	Supervising Judge of the Midlands, Wales and the West
61	Dame Naomi Ellenbogen	20 March 2045	2 November 2020	King's Bench	
62	Dame Joanna Smith	27 April 2043	11 January 2021	Business and Property	
63	Dame Emma Arbuthnot	9 January 2034	1 February 2021	Family	
64	Sir James Mellor	16 May 2036	8 February 2021	Business and Property	
65	Sir Edwin Johnson	11 May 2038	1 October 2021	Business and Property	President of the Lands Chamber of the Upper Tribunal
66	Sir Barry Cotter	30 July 2038	1 October 2021	King's Bench	
67	Sir Stephen Eyre	17 October 2032	1 October 2021	King's Bench	
68	Dame Heather Williams	2038	1 October 2021	King's Bench	President of the Administrative Appeals Chamber of the Upper Tribunal
69	Sir Andrew Ritchie	4 May 2035	1 October 2021	King's Bench	
70	Sir Thomas Leech	16 February 2039	1 November 2021	Business and Property	Vice-Chancellor of the County Palatine of Lancaster
71	Sir Joel Bennathan	15 July 2036	11 January 2022	King's Bench	
72	Dame Henrietta Hill	30 September 2048	11 January 2022	King's Bench	
73	Sir Derek Sweeting	2035	11 January 2022	King's Bench	
74	Dame Sarah Morgan	17 September 2039	11 January 2022	Family	
75	Sir Robert Bright	22 August 2039	11 January 2023	Business and Property	
76	Sir Jonathan Richards		11 January 2023	Business and Property	
77	Sir Richard Smith	2045	20 February 2023	Business and Property	
78	Sir Adam Constable	26 January 2048	13 March 2023	Business and Property	Judge in Charge of the Technology and Construction Court
79	Dame Julia Dias	31 January 2034	20 March 2023	Business and Property	
80	Sir Eason Rajah	18 January 2042	18 April 2023	Business and Property	
81	Dame Ruth Henke		29 September 2023	Family	
82	Sir Nicholas Cusworth	20 March 2039	11 January 2024	Family	
83	Sir Clive Sheldon	13 October 2041	1 February 2024	King's Bench	
84	Sir Timothy Mould	22 May 2035	1 February 2024	King's Bench	Planning Liaison Judge
85	Sir Damian Garrido	7 June 2044	30 September 2024	Family	
86	Dame Sonia Harris	12 September 2049	30 September 2024	Family	
87	Sir Nicholas Thompsell	September 2034	1 October 2024	Business and Property	
88	Sir Dexter Dias	September 2037	1 October 2024	King's Bench	
89	Sir Stephen Trowell	5 October 2042	2 October 2024	Family	
90	Sir Richard Harrison	13 November 2043	2 December 2024	Family	
91	Sir John McKendrick	31 March 2051	10 March 2025	Family	
92	Sir Mark Cawson	4 June 2034	1 October 2025	Business and Property	
93	Sir Simon Birt	5 March 2050	3 October 2025	Business and Property	
94	Dame Margaret Obi	September 2043	3 October 2025	King's Bench	
95	Dame Heather Norton	24 November 2041	6 October 2025	King's Bench	
96	Sir Gavin Mansfield	February 2044	3 November 2025	King's Bench	
97	Sir Richard Kimblin	10 December 2041	12 November 2025	King's Bench	
98	Dame Catherine [Kate] Brunner	5 August 2047	17 November 2025	King's Bench	
99	Sir Jason Coppel		12 January 2026	King's Bench	
100	Sir Neil Moody	1 August 2040	29 January 2026	King's Bench	
101	Sir Michael Tappin	11 November 2039	1 October 2026	Business and Property	
102	Dame Nicola Rushton DBE	27 February 2045	1 October 2026	Business and Property	
103	Sir Paul Stanley		1 October 2026	Business and Property	
104	Sir Christopher Twigger		1 October 2026	Business and Property	
105	Sir Nigel Lickley		1 October 2026	King's Bench	
106	Sir Daniel Kolinsky		1 October 2026	King's Bench	
107	Sir James Squires		1 October 2026	King's Bench	
108	Sir Aidan Eardley	1 September 2045	1 October 2026	King's Bench	
109	Sir James Ewins	7 January 2048	19 October 2026	Family	

== Former judges ==
=== Common Pleas Division (1875–81) ===
The Common Pleas Division was one of the original divisions of the High Court. It was created in 1875 through the merger of the Court of Common Pleas into the High Court. The five existing Justices of the Common Pleas were transferred to the new Common Pleas Division, and retained their previous titles until they left office. The Common Pleas Division was merged into the King's Bench Division in 1881, and all of its remaining Justices were transferred to the latter.

The head of the Division was the Chief Justice of the Common Pleas; the post was abolished along with the Common Pleas Division in 1881, and its powers vested in the Lord Chief Justice.

Name	Known as	Division	In succession to	Term began	Term ended	Reason	Notes
Sir William Baliol Brett	Mr Justice Brett	Common Pleas	None (transferred from the Court of Common Pleas)	1 November 1875	24 October 1876	Appointed Lord Justice of Appeal	MP for Helston 1866–68; Solicitor General 1868; Lord Justice of Appeal 1876–83; PC 1876; Master of the Rolls 1883–97; created Baron Esher in 1885; created Viscount Esher in 1897
Sir William Robert Grove	Mr Justice Grove	Common Pleas	None (transferred from the Court of Common Pleas)	1 November 1875	26 February 1881	Common Pleas Division merged into the King's Bench Division	Justice of the Court of Common Pleas 1871–75; PC 1887
Sir William Robert Grove	Mr Justice Grove	King's Bench	None (Common Pleas Division merged into the King's Bench Division)	26 February 1881	2 September 1887	Resignation	Justice of the Court of Common Pleas 1871–75; PC 1887
Hon George Denman	Mr Justice Denman	Common Pleas	None (transferred from the Court of Common Pleas)	1 November 1875	26 February 1881	Common Pleas Division merged into the King's Bench Division	MP for Tiverton 1859–65 and 1866–72; Justice of the Common Pleas 1872–75; refused knighthood upon appointment; PC 1893 [XXXFamilyXXX]
Hon George Denman	Mr Justice Denman	King's Bench	None (Common Pleas Division merged into the King's Bench Division)	26 February 1881	17 October 1892	Resignation	MP for Tiverton 1859–65 and 1866–72; Justice of the Common Pleas 1872–75; refused knighthood upon appointment; PC 1893 [XXXFamilyXXX]
Sir Thomas Dickson Archibald	Mr Justice Archibald	Common Pleas	None (transferred from the Court of Common Pleas)	1 November 1875	18 October 1876	Death	Junior Counsel to the Treasury 1868–72; Justice of the King's Bench 1872–75; Justice of the Common Pleas 1875
Sir Nathaniel Lindley	Mr Justice Lindley	Common Pleas	None (transferred from the Court of Common Pleas)	1 November 1875	26 February 1881	Common Pleas Division merged into the King's Bench Division	Justice of the Common Pleas 1875; Lord Justice of Appeal 1881–97; PC 1881; Master of the Rolls 1897–1900; Lord of Appeal in Ordinary 1900–05; created Baron Lindley in 1900
Sir Nathaniel Lindley	Mr Justice Lindley	King's Bench	None (Common Pleas Division merged into the King's Bench Division)	26 February 1881	1 November 1881	Appointed Lord Justice of Appeal	Justice of the Common Pleas 1875; Lord Justice of Appeal 1881–97; PC 1881; Master of the Rolls 1897–1900; Lord of Appeal in Ordinary 1900–05; created Baron Lindley in 1900
Sir Henry Charles Lopes	Mr Justice Lopes	Common Pleas	Mr Justice Archibald	7 November 1876	26 February 1881	Common Pleas Division merged into the King's Bench Division	MP for Launceston 1868–74; MP for Frome 1874–76; Lord Justice of Appeal 1885–97; PC 1885; created Baron Ludlow in 1897
Sir Henry Charles Lopes	Mr Justice Lopes	King's Bench	None (Common Pleas Division merged into the King's Bench Division)	26 February 1881	1 December 1885	Appointed Lord Justice of Appeal	MP for Launceston 1868–74; MP for Frome 1874–76; Lord Justice of Appeal 1885–97; PC 1885; created Baron Ludlow in 1897

=== Exchequer Division (1875–81) ===
The Exchequer Division was one of the original divisions of the High Court. It was created in 1875 through the merger of the Court of Exchequer into the High Court. The six existing Barons of the Exchequer were transferred to the new Exchequer Division, and retained their previous titles until they left office. Sir Henry Hawkins, the first judge to be directly appointed to the Exchequer Division, tried in vain to obtain the title of Baron, but was styled a Judge of the High Court instead. The Exchequer Division was merged into the King's Bench Division in 1881, and all of its remaining Justices were transferred to the latter.

The head of the Division was the Chief Baron of the Exchequer; the post was abolished along with the Exchequer Division in 1881, and its powers vested in the Lord Chief Justice.

Name	Known as	Division	In succession to	Term began	Term ended	Reason	Notes
Sir George William Wilshere Bramwell	Mr Baron Bramwell	Exchequer	None (transferred from the Court of Exchequer)	1 November 1875	23 October 1876	Appointed Lord Justice of Appeal	Baron of the Exchequer 1856–76; Lord Justice of Appeal 1876–81; PC 1876; created Baron Bramwell in 1882
Sir Anthony Cleasby	Mr Baron Cleasby	Exchequer	None (transferred from the Court of Exchequer)	1 November 1875	9 January 1879	Resignation	Baron of the Exchequer 1868–79
Sir Charles Edward Pollock	Mr Baron Pollock	Exchequer	None (transferred from the Court of Exchequer)	1 November 1875	26 February 1881	Exchequer Division merged into the King's Bench Division	Baron of the Exchequer 1873–97 (last Baron of the Exchequer) [Family]
Sir Charles Edward Pollock	Mr Baron Pollock	King's Bench	None (Exchequer Division merged into the King's Bench Division)	26 February 1881	21 November 1897	Death	Baron of the Exchequer 1873–97 (last Baron of the Exchequer) [Family]
Sir Richard Paul Amphlett	Mr Baron Amphlett	Exchequer	None (transferred from the Court of Exchequer)	1 November 1875	25 October 1876	Appointed Lord Justice of Appeal	MP for East Worcestershire 1868–74; Baron of the Exchequer 1874–76; Lord Justice of Appeal 1876–77; PC 1876
Sir John Walter Huddleston	Mr Baron Huddleston	Exchequer	None (transferred from the Court of Exchequer)	1 November 1875	26 February 1881	Exchequer Division merged into the King's Bench Division	Judge Advocate of the Fleet 1865–75; MP for Canterbury 1865–68; MP for Norwich 1874–75; Justice of the Common Pleas 1875; Baron of the Exchequer 1875–90
Sir John Walter Huddleston	Mr Baron Huddleston	King's Bench	None (Exchequer Division merged into the King's Bench Division)	26 February 1881	5 December 1890	Death	Judge Advocate of the Fleet 1865–75; MP for Canterbury 1865–68; MP for Norwich 1874–75; Justice of the Common Pleas 1875; Baron of the Exchequer 1875–90
Sir Henry Hawkins	Mr Justice Hawkins?	King's Bench	?	2 November 1876	14 November 1876	Transferred to the Exchequer Division	Created Baron Brampton in 1899; PC 1899
Sir Henry Hawkins	Mr Justice Hawkins?	Exchequer	?	14 November 1876	26 February 1881	Exchequer Division merged into the King's Bench Division	Created Baron Brampton in 1899; PC 1899
Sir Henry Hawkins	Mr Justice Hawkins?	King's Bench	None (Exchequer Division merged into the King's Bench Division)	26 February 1881	4 January 1899	Resignation	Created Baron Brampton in 1899; PC 1899
Sir James Fitzjames Stephen	Mr Justice Stephen	Exchequer	Mr Baron Cleasby	15 January 1879	26 February 1881	Exchequer Division merged into the King's Bench Division	Legal member of the Imperial Legislative Council 1869–72; KCSI 1877; created a baronet in 1891
Sir James Fitzjames Stephen	Mr Justice Stephen	King's Bench	None (Exchequer Division merged into the King's Bench Division)	26 February 1881	6 April 1891	Resignation	Legal member of the Imperial Legislative Council 1869–72; KCSI 1877; created a baronet in 1891

== See also ==
- Justice of the Supreme Court of the United Kingdom
- List of judges of the Court of Appeal of England and Wales
- Senator of the College of Justice
