= 2022 Special Honours =

British government recognitions

As part of the British honours system, Special Honours are issued at the Monarch's pleasure at any given time. The Special Honours refer to the awards made within royal prerogative, operational honours, political honours and other honours awarded outside the New Year Honours and Birthday Honours.

== Life Peerage ==
=== Conservative Party ===
- Richard Harrington, to be Baron Harrington of Watford, of Watford in the County of Hertfordshire – 15 March 2022
- Sir Christopher Bellamy, QC, to be Baron Bellamy, of Waddesdon in the County of Buckinghamshire – 14 June 2022
- Nick Markham, CBE, to be Baron Markham, of East Horsley in the County of Surrey – 7 October 2022
- Dominic Johnson, CBE, to be Baron Johnson of Lainston, of Lainston in the County of Hampshire – 19 October 2022
- Simon Murray, Baron Murray of Blidworth, of Blidworth in the County of Nottinghamshire – 21 October 2022
- The Right Honourable Sir Nicholas Soames, to be Baron Soames of Fletching, of Fletching in the County of East Sussex – 28 October 2022
- Dr. Ruth Lea, CBE, to be Baroness Lea of Lymm, of Lymm in the Borough of Warrington in the County of Cheshire – 31 October 2022
- Professor Andrew Roberts, to be Baron Roberts of Belgravia, of Belgravia in the City of Westminster – 1 November 2022
- The Right Honourable Sir Hugo Swire, KCMG, to be Baron Swire, of Down St Mary in the County of Devon – 1 November 2022
- Sir Michael Hintze, to be Baron Hintze, of Dunster in the County of Somerset – 3 November 2022
- Dr. Sheila Lawlor, to be Baroness Lawlor, of Midsummer Common in the City of Cambridge – 3 November 2022
- Teresa O'Neill, OBE, to be Baroness O'Neill of Bexley, of Crook Log in the London Borough of Bexley – 7 November 2022
- Angie Bray, to be Baroness Bray of Coln, of Coln St. Aldwyns in the County of Gloucestershire – 8 November 2022
- Dr. Dambisa Moyo, to be Baroness Moyo, of Knightsbridge in the City of Westminster – 8 November 2022
- Graham Evans, to be Baron Evans of Rainow, of Macclesfield in the County of Cheshire – 9 November 2022
- Stewart Jackson, to be Baron Jackson of Peterborough, of Peterborough in the County of Cambridgeshire – 16 November 2022
- Kate Lampard, CBE, to be Baroness Lampard, of Frinsted in the County of Kent – 17 November 2022
- Dr. Cleveland Anthony Sewell, CBE, to be Baron Sewell of Sanderstead, of Sanderstead in the County of Surrey – 16 December 2022

=== Labour Party ===
- Sharon Taylor, OBE, to be Baroness Taylor of Stevenage, of Stevenage in the County of Hertfordshire – 28 October 2022
- Sonny Leong, CBE, to be Baron Leong, of Chilton in the County of Oxfordshire and of Camden Town in the London Borough of Camden – 31 October 2022
- Kuldip Singh Sahota, to be Baron Sahota, of Telford in the County of Shropshire – 2 November 2022
- Dr. Fiona Twycross, to be Baroness Twycross, of Headington in the City of Oxford – 7 November 2022
- Ruth Smeeth, to be Baroness Anderson of Stoke-on-Trent, of Stoke-on-Trent in the County of Staffordshire – 18 November 2022
- David Prentis, to be Baron Prentis of Leeds, of Harehills in the City of Leeds – 18 November 2022
- Thomas Watson, to be Baron Watson of Wyre Forest, of Kidderminster in the County of Worcestershire – 21 November 2022
- Frances O'Grady, to be Baroness O'Grady of Upper Holloway, of Wood Farm in the City of Oxford – 9 December 2022

=== Democratic Unionist Party ===
- Peter Weir, to be Baron Weir of Ballyholme, of Ballyholme in the County of Down – 16 November 2022

=== Crossbench ===
- Shaista Gohir, OBE, to be Baroness Gohir, of Hall Green in the City of Birmingham – 28 June 2022
- Professor Katherine Willis, CBE, to be Baroness Willis of Summertown, of Summertown in the City of Oxford – 8 July 2022
- Sir Peter Hendy, CBE, to be Baron Hendy of Richmond Hill, of Imber in the County of Wiltshire – 17 November 2022
- Air Chief Marshal Sir Stuart Peach, GBE, KCB, DL, to be Baron Peach, of Grantham in the County of Lincolnshire – 21 November 2022

=== Non-affiliated ===
- Professor Guglielmo Verdirame, KC, to be Baron Verdirame, of Belsize Park in the London Borough of Camden – 2 November 2022
- The Right Honourable Dame Arlene Foster, DBE, to be Baroness Foster of Aghadrumsee, of Aghadrumsee in the County of Fermanagh – 9 November 2022

== Lord Lieutenant ==
- Lucy Winskell, OBE – to be Lord-Lieutenant of Tyne and Wear – 21 February 2022
- Iain Macaulay – to be Lord-Lieutenant for the Western Isles – 8 March 2022
- Lady Emma Barnard – to be Lord-Lieutenant of West Sussex – 23 May 2022
- Susan Lousada – to be Lord-Lieutenant of Bedfordshire – 23 May 2022
- Mohammed Saddiq – to be Lord-Lieutenant of Somerset – 1 August 2022
- Beatrice Grant – to be Lord-Lieutenant of Worcestershire – 15 December 2022

== Most Ancient and Most Noble Order of the Thistle ==
Order of the Thistle ribbon

=== Lady of the Order of the Thistle (LT) ===
- The Right Honourable Dame Elish Angiolini, DBE, QC, FRSA, FRSE – 10 June 2022

=== Knight of the Order of the Thistle (KT) ===
- The Right Honourable Sir George Reid, FRSE – 10 June 2022

== Privy Counsellor ==
- Chris Heaton-Harris MP – 16 February 2022
- The Right Honourable The Baroness Williams of Trafford – 3 March 2022
- Elin Jones MS – 16 March 2022
- Alison Johnstone MSP – 16 March 2022
- The Honourable Lord Doherty QC – 13 April 2022
- The Honourable Lady Wise QC – 13 April 2022
- The Honourable Lord Tyre CBE QC – 13 April 2022
- Shailesh Vara MP – 8 July 2022
- Andrew Stephenson MP – 8 July 2022
- The Honourable Lord Matthews QC – 19 July 2022
- Johnny Mercer MP – 19 July 2022
- Sir Clive Alderton KCVO – 13 September 2022
- Kemi Badenoch MP – 13 September 2022
- Ranil Jayawardena MP – 13 September 2022
- Wendy Morton MP – 13 September 2022
- The Right Honourable The Lord True CBE – 13 September 2022
- Chloe Smith MP – 13 September 2022
- Edward Argar MP – 13 September 2022
- Simon Case CVO – 13 September 2022
- Vicky Ford MP – 13 September 2022
- James Heappey MP – 13 September 2022
- Stephen McPartland MP – 13 September 2022
- Chris Philp MP – 13 September 2022
- Graham Stuart MP – 13 September 2022
- Tom Tugendhat MBE VR MP – 13 September 2022
- The Honourable Sir Thomas Mark Horner KC – 19 October 2022
- David TC Davies MP – 27 October 2022
- Gillian Keegan MP – 27 October 2022
- John Glen MP – 27 October 2022
- The Honourable Victoria Prentis MP – 27 October 2022
- Jeremy Quin MP – 27 October 2022
- Rachel Reeves MP – 1 November 2022
- The Right Honourable The Lord Kennedy of Southwark – 1 November 2022
- The Honourable Dame Sarah Falk DBE, KC – 14 December 2022

== Knight Bachelor ==
Knight Bachelor ribbon

- The Right Honourable Gavin Williamson, CBE, MP – 3 March 2022
- The Honourable Mr. Justice Charles Gregory Bourne, QC – 16 March 2022
- The Honourable Mr. Justice Neil Richard Calver, QC – 16 March 2022
- The Honourable Mr. Justice Barry Paul Cotter, QC – 16 March 2022
- The Honourable Mr. Justice Stephen John Arthur Eyre, QC – 16 March 2022
- The Honourable Mr. Justice Michael John Fordham, QC – 16 March 2022
- The Honourable Mr. Justice David Andrew Foxton, QC – 16 March 2022
- The Honourable Mr. Justice Michael Anthony Green, QC – 16 March 2022
- The Honourable Mr. Justice Andrew Raywod Henshaw, QC – 16 March 2022
- The Honourable Mr. Justice Nicholas Richard Maybury Hilliard, QC – 16 March 2022
- The Honourable Mr. Justice Michael Robert Humphreys, QC – 16 March 2022
- The Honourable Mr. Justice Adam Martin Johnson, QC – 16 March 2022
- The Honourable Mr. Justice Edwin Geoffrey Johnson, QC – 16 March 2022
- The Honourable Mr. Justice Thomas Alexander Crispin Leech, QC – 16 March 2022
- The Honourable Mr. Justice Thomas Dominic Linden, QC – 16 March 2022
- The Honourable Mr. Justice David Kennedy McFarland, QC – 16 March 2022
- The Honourable Mr. Justice Edward James Mellor, QC – 16 March 2022
- The Honourable Mr. Justice Robert John Miles, QC – 16 March 2022
- The Honourable Mr. Justice Robert Roger Peel, QC – 16 March 2022
- The Honourable Mr. Justice Nigel David Poole, QC – 16 March 2022
- The Honourable Mr. Justice Andrew George Ritchie, QC – 16 March 2022
- The Honourable Mr. Justice Kevin James Rooney, QC – 16 March 2022
- The Honourable Mr. Justice David Alister Scoffield, QC – 16 March 2022
- The Honourable Mr. Justice Mark Arthur Wall, QC – 16 March 2022
- The Right Honourable Jake Berry, MP – 15 October 2022 – Member of Parliament for Rossendale and Darwen, Minister without Portfolio and Chairman of the Conservative Party, former Minister of State for the Northern Powerhouse and Local Growth. For political and public service to the North of England.
- The Right Honourable John Whittingdale, OBE, MP – 15 October 2022 – Member of Parliament for Maldon, former Secretary of State for Culture, Media and Sport. For political and public service.

== Most Honourable Order of the Bath ==
Ribbon bar of the Order of the Bath

=== Knight Grand Cross of the Order of the Bath (GCB) ===
Honorary

- His Excellency Cyril Ramaphosa – President of the Republic of South Africa – 22 November 2022

== Order of Merit ==
Six new members of the order were chosen by Elizabeth II shortly before her death. The appointments were formally made by Charles III two months later.

Order of Merit ribbon

- Sir David Adjaye, OBE, RA – 11 November 2022
- Professor Dame Elizabeth Anionwu, DBE, FCRN – 11 November 2022
- The Right Honourable The Baroness Benjamin, DBE, DL – 11 November 2022
- Professor Margaret MacMillan, CC, CH, FRSL, FRSC, FBA, FRCGS (Canadian) – 11 November 2022
- Sir Paul Nurse, CH, FRS – 11 November 2022
- Venki Ramakrishnan – 11 November 2022

== Most Distinguished Order of St Michael and St George ==
Order of St Michael and St George ribbon

=== Knight / Dame Grand Cross of the Order of St Michael and St George (GCMG) ===
- Her Excellency Froyla Tzalam – On her appointment as Governor-General of Belize – 18 March 2022
- His Excellency The Reverend Tofiga Vaevalu Falani, MBE, Governor-General of Tuvalu – 18 September 2022

=== Knight Commander of the Order of St Michael and St George (KCMG) ===
- James Duddridge, MP – 15 October 2022 – Member of Parliament Rochford and Southend East, Minister of State for International Trade; former Parliamentary Under-Secretary of State for Africa, for DEXEU, Lord Commissioner of HM Treasury, and Parliamentary Private Secretary to the Prime Minister. For political and public service.

Honorary

- His Excellency Khaled Al-Duwaisan, GCVO – 19 July 2022 – upon relinquishing his appointment as Ambassador from the State of Kuwait to the Court of St James's and upon retiring as Dean of the Diplomatic Corps

=== Companion of the Order of St Michael and St George (CMG) ===
- Theodor Meron, CMG – 8 March 2022 – Honorary appointment in 2019 to be made Substantive

Honorary

- Gonzalo Muñoz Abogabir – High-Level Champion for the United Nations Climate Change Conference of the Parties. For services to tackling climate change and supporting the UK Presidency of the 2021 UN Climate Change Conference.

== Royal Victorian Order ==
Royal Victorian Order ribbon

=== Knight Commander of the Royal Victorian Order (KCVO) ===
- Admiral Sir James Francis Perowne, KBE – on relinquishment of the appointment of Constable and Governor, Windsor Castle – 19 July 2022

=== Commander of the Royal Victorian Order (CVO) ===
- Rear Admiral James Macleod, CB – upon relinquishing his appointment as Defence Services Secretary – 16 February 2022
- Melissa Sarah Morris, LVO – on relinquishment of the appointment of Secretary, Lord Chamberlain's Office – 22 June 2022
- The Reverend Canon Jonathan Byam Valentine Riviere, LVO – on relinquishment of the appointment of Domestic Chaplain at Sandringham – 5 July 2022

=== Lieutenant of the Royal Victorian Order (LVO) ===
- Rachel Ann Jane Gordon, MVO, RVM – on relinquishment of the appointment of Housekeeper, Windsor Castle – 31 March 2022
- Thomas Robert Laing-Baker – on relinquishment of the appointment of Assistant Private Secretary to The Queen – 27 April 2022
- Donal Valentine McCabe – on relinquishment of the appointment of Communications Secretary to the Queen – 6 September 2022

=== Member of the Royal Victorian Order (MVO) ===
- Captain Sure Limbu, Gurkha Staff and Personnel Support – 14 July 2022
- Captain Krishnapresad Loksam, The Royal Gurkha Rifles – 14 July 2022
- Lieutenant Colonel Thomas Garry White – on relinquishment of the appointment as Equerry to Her Late Majesty The Queen – 19 October 2022

Honorary

- Robert Large, RVM – lately Yeoman of the Royal Cellars – 17 July 2022

== Most Excellent Order of the British Empire ==
Ribbon bar of the Order of the British Empire (Civil)

Ribbon bar of the Order of the British Empire (Military)

=== Knight / Dame Commander of the Order of the British Empire (KBE / DBE) ===
Civil division

- Caroline Dinenage, MP – 31 December 2021 – Member of Parliament for Gosport, formerly Minister of State for Digital and Culture. For public and political service.
- The Right Honourable Robert Buckland, QC, MP – 31 December 2021 – Member of Parliament for South Swindon, formerly Lord Chancellor and Secretary of State for Justice. For public and political service.
- The Honourable Mrs. Justice Emma Louise Arbuthnot, The Lady Arbuthnot of Edrom, QC – 16 March 2022
- The Honourable Mrs. Justice Kelyn Meher Bacon, QC – 16 March 2022
- The Honourable Mrs. Justice Rowena Collins Rice, QC – 16 March 2022
- The Honourable Mrs. Justice Naomi Lisa Ellenbogen, QC – 16 March 2022
- The Honourable Mrs. Justice Joanna Angela Smith, QC – 16 March 2022
- The Honourable Mrs. Justice Mary Elizabeth Stacey, QC – 16 March 2022
- The Honourable Mrs. Justice Amanda Jane Tipples, QC – 16 March 2022
- The Honourable Mrs. Justice Heather Jean Williams, QC – 16 March 2022
- Deborah James – 12 May 2022

Honorary

- Christiana Figueres – International Climate Leader. For services to International Leadership on Global Climate Change.
- John Williams – Composer and Conductor. For Services to Film Music.
- Bob Iger – Former Chairman & Chief Executive Officer, Disney Company. For Services to the UK/US Relations.

=== Commander of the Order of the British Empire (CBE) ===
Civil division
Honorary

- Ben Barkow – Former Chief Executive, Wiener Holocaust Library. For Services to Holocaust Education and Remembrance.
- Rafael del Pino Calvo-Sotelo – Chairman, Ferrovial. For services to the UK transport and infrastructure sectors.
- Ken Hom, OBE – Chef and Author. For services to charity, culinary arts and education.
- Dr. Susan Hopkins – Healthcare Epidemiologist Consultant in Infectious Diseases and Microbiology at Public Health England. For services to Public Health.
- Ali Koç – Vice-Chair of Board, Koç Holdings. For services to Trade and Investment between Britain and Turkey.
- Ajay Piramal – India Co-Chair UK-India CEO Forum. For services to the UK-India trade relationship.
- Professor Cheng-Hock Toh – Lately President, British Society for Haematology and Academic Vice-President, Royal College of Physicians. For services to haematology and medicine.
- Sarina Wiegman – England Women’s National Football Coach. For services to Association football.

Military division

- Brigadier Daniel Blanchford, OBE, Royal Marines
- Air Commodore Simon Robert Strasdin, OBE, Royal Air Force
- Commodore (now Rear Admiral) Stephen Mark Richard Moorhouse, OBE, Royal Navy

=== Officer of the Order of the British Empire (OBE) ===
Civil division

- Ronan Lyons, OBE – 5 January 2022 – Honorary appointed in 2021 to be made Substantive

Honorary

- Frans Caljé – Chief Executive Officer, PD Ports. For services to International Trade.
- Phaedon Christopoulos – Managing Director of CPPC Logistics, Sovereign Base Area Cyprus. For services to British Forces Cyprus and the Sovereign Base Area Administration.
- Professor Keith Humphreys – Esther Ting Memorial Professor of Psychiatry & Behavioural Sciences, Stanford University. For services to UK-US Relations.
- George Holding – Congressman, US House of Representatives. For services to Science and Policy on Addiction.
- Kishore Jayaraman – President Rolls-Royce India and South Asia. For services to International Trade and Investment.
- Dr. Vinod Joshi – Retired dentist and founder of the Mouth Cancer Foundation in the UK. Retired dentist and founder of the Mouth Cancer Foundation in the UK.
- Bear Montique – Interim Chief Executive Officer, Standing Together Against Domestic Violence and Founder, Advance Advocacy Service. For services to the prevention of violence against women and girls.
- Neil Peck – Former Attorney and Honorary Consul. For services to UK-Colorado relations.
- Patricia Mawuli Porter – Co-founder and Pilot, Aviation and Technology Academy Ghana. For services to Aviation.
- Roisin Quinn – Senior Manager, National Grid. For services to the Electricity System, Energy Security and Decarbonisation.
- Professor Paula Reimer – Director, CHRONO Centre for Climate, Environment and Chronology, Queen’s University Belfast. For Services to Radiocarbon Dating, Calibration and Chronology.
- Dorothea Ruland – Secretary General, German Academic Exchange Service. For services to the British/German relationship.
- Darren Walker – President Ford Foundation. For Services to UK/US Relations.
- Susan Whelan – Chief Executive, Leicester City Football Club. For services to Football, the economy in the East Midlands and the wider community in Leicester.

Military division

- Lieutenant Colonel David Christopher Middleton, The Parachute Regiment
- Lieutenant Colonel Thomas Rupert Mark Robinson, The Light Dragoons
- Wing Commander Thomas Leslie Stevenson, MBE, Royal Air Force
- Commander Claire Fiona Thompson, Royal Navy
- Lieutenant Colonel William James Meddings, The Royal Anglian Regiment

=== Member of the Order of the British Empire (MBE) ===
Civil division

- Brigitte Zelie Squire-Dehouch, MBE – 5 January 2022 – Honorary appointed in 2010 to be made Substantive
- Ann Hutchinson Guest, MBE – 8 March 2022 – Honorary appointed in 2021 to be made Substantive
- Diala Khlat, MBE – 5 January 2022 – Honorary appointed in 2021 to be made Substantive

Honorary

- Dr. Shehlina Ahmed – Health Adviser. For services to health in Bangladesh.
- Marwan Al-Jarah – Counter-Terrorism Programme Support Officer. For services to National Security and human rights.
- Jan Bartu – Performance Director, Modern Pentathlon. For services to Modern Pentathlon.
- Manog Bissoondutt – Humane Society Manager, British Virgin Islands. For services to animal welfare within the British Virgin Islands.
- Cindi Black – Owner and Director, Great Western pre-school, Aberdeenshire. For services to Pre-School Education in Aberdeen.
- Roberto Castiglioni – Disability Rights campaigner. For services to Aviation Accessibility.
- Marcela Černochová – Managing Director, British Chamber of Commerce. For services to British business in the Czech Republic.
- Barbara Chantrill – Founder, Leicestershire Education Business Company. For services to Education.
- Professor Daniel Charny – Designer. For services to Design and Creativity.
- Dr. Margaret Coffey – Clinical Service Lead (ENT/Head & Neck), Imperial College Healthcare NHS Trust. For services to Speech and Language Therapy.
- Philippe Corréa – Director of Industrial Relations at the French Alternative Energies and Atomic Energy Com-mission. For services to UK and France Nuclear co-operation.
- Professor Daniela De Angelis – Professor of Statistical Science for Health, University of Cambridge. Science for Health, University of Cambridge For services to Medical Research and Public Health.
- Dónal Doherty – Conductor Codetta Choir. For services to Music in Northern Ireland.
- Major (Rtd) Brian Duffy – Chairman, Royal British Legion, Republic of Ireland Branch. Chairman, Royal British Legion, Republic of Ireland Branch.
- Pierre Gomez – Data Supervisor Medical Research Council Unit, The Gambia. For services to Medical Research in The Gambia.
- Akira Haseyama – Former President of Keio University. For services to the British Olympic and Paralympic Teams.
- Fumiko Hayashi – Former Mayor of Yokohama. For services to the British Olympic and Paralympic Teams.
- Verena Katharina Hefti – Founder, Leaders Plus. For services to Equality.
- Roberto Herrera Pablo – Country Manager and Board Member of InterEnergy Group. For services to Sustainable and Clean Energy.
- Dr. Shafie Kamaruddin – Deputy Medical Director, County Durham and Darlington NHS Foundation Trust. For services to the NHS.
- Alena Krajtlova – Training Wing Assistant. For services to UK International Defence engagement Programmes.
- Guruswamy Krishnamoorthy – Chief Executive Officer, Penlon. For services to the Ventilator Challenge.
- Dr. Mikael Mikaelsson – Science and Innovation Officer, British Embassy Stockholm. For services to International collaboration on Climate Change.
- Sinéad Murphy – Founder and CCO Shnuggle. For services to Trade and the Economy in Northern Ireland.
- Daisy Narayanan – Lately Director of Urbanism, Sustrans. For services to Inclusive Urban Planning.
- Miriam Purves – Nurse, Western Health and Social Care Trust. For services to Nursing during COVID-19.
- Arevik Saribekyan – Country Director, British Council in Armenia. For services to UK/Armenia Cultural Relations.
- Elizabeth Schlachter – Former Executive Director Family Planning 2020. Former Executive Director Family Planning 2020.
- Yasuhisa Shiozaki – Former Co-Chair of UK-Japan 21st Century Group. For services to UK/Japan relations.
- Yau Kong Tham – Military historian, Malaysian conservationist and tour guide in Sabah, Malaysia. For services to Environmental, Historical and Cultural Conservation.
- Takashi Tsukamoto – Chair, The Japan-British Society. For services to UK/Japan relations.
- Muhidin Tutic – Protocol and Visits Officer, EU Force HQ, Sarajevo. For services to UK operations and observed acts of remembrance in Bosnia and Herzegovina.
- Mary Vine-Morris – Area Director, Association of Colleges, London. For services to Further Education.
- Ronald Claus Julian Weber – Victims Commissioner of the State of Berlin. For services to UK/German relations.

Military division

- Major Stephen Geoffrey White, The Parachute Regiment
- Warrant Officer Class 2 Daniel James Bryceland, Corps of Royal Engineers
- Warrant Officer Class 2 Thomas Anthony Whitehead, Intelligence Corps
- Chief Petty Officer Logistician (Supply Chain) Laura Perry, Royal Navy
- Warrant Officer Class 1 Engineering Technician (Marine Engineering) Clint Wheeler, Royal Navy
- Major Benjamin Sean Costello Attrell, Corps of Royal Engineers
- Major Steven John Howard, Army Air Corps
- Squadron Leader Jonathan Jack Eddison, Royal Air Force
- Flight Lieutenant Victoria Grace Kellagher, Royal Air Force

== British Empire Medal (BEM) ==
Ribbon bar of the British Empire Medal (Civil)

Honorary

- Joan Bruton – Retired Founder of Light House Trust Summer School. For services to the Disabled Community in Ireland.
- Bruna Cerqueira – Senior Climate Adviser, British Embassy Brasilia. For services to UK interests in Brazil.
- Brian Coleman – Founder, Two Touch project. For services to Exercise and Well-being for Cardiac patients.
- Astrid Gillespie – Leader and Volunteer, Friends of All Saints Church Volunteer Group, East Horndon. For services to Community Heritage.
- Isabelle Gouget – Occupational therapist, Oxford NHS Foundation Trust. For services to Occupational Therapy during Covid-19.
- Daniela Anna Jenkins – Executive Director, Charlbury Community Centre. For services to the community in Charlbury, Oxfordshire.
- Paresh Jethwa – Co-Founder Community Response Kitchen. FFor services to the community in the London Borough of Hendon during COVID-19.
- Reshmi Kalam – Community and NHS volunteer. For services to community in Maidstone, Kent during COVID-19.
- Sotiris Katsimpas – IT Manager, The Edinburgh Remakery. For services to Third Sector Charity during COVID-19.
- Tarsem Kaur – Community volunteer. For services to the Community in Handsworth, Birmingham particularly during COVID-19.
- Ronald Loof – President, Risquons Tous World War 2 Memorial Association. For services to the remembrance of British Soldiers who died in Mouscron in 1940.
- Alan Mulligan – District Treasurer for the Royal British Legion, Republic of Ireland. For services to the Royal British Legion.
- Thi Bich Ngan Nguyen – Corporate Services Manager, British Embassy Vietnam. For services to UK/Vietnam relations.
- Abraham Heinrich Wermuth – Volunteer. For services to Holocaust education and awareness.
- Kabura Zakama – North-East Regional Coordinator, British High Commission Abuja. For services to the UK in Nigeria.

== Air Force Cross (AFC) ==
Ribbon bar of the Air Force Cross

- Wing Commander Kevin Harry Thomas Latchman, Royal Air Force
- Flight Lieutenant Edward Bindloss Gibb, Royal Air Force

== Royal Victorian Medal (RVM) ==
Royal Victorian Medal ribbon

Silver

- Clive Dalton Jones – Verger, the Royal Chapel, Windsor Great Park – 2 June 2022

== Mentioned in Despatches ==
Palm of the Mentioned in Despatches

- Private Ahmad Fahim, The Parachute Regiment
- Corporal Daniel Matthew Hoyland, The Parachute Regiment
- Sergeant Adam James Humphreys, 1st The Queen’s Dragoon Guards

== Queen's Commendation for Bravery ==
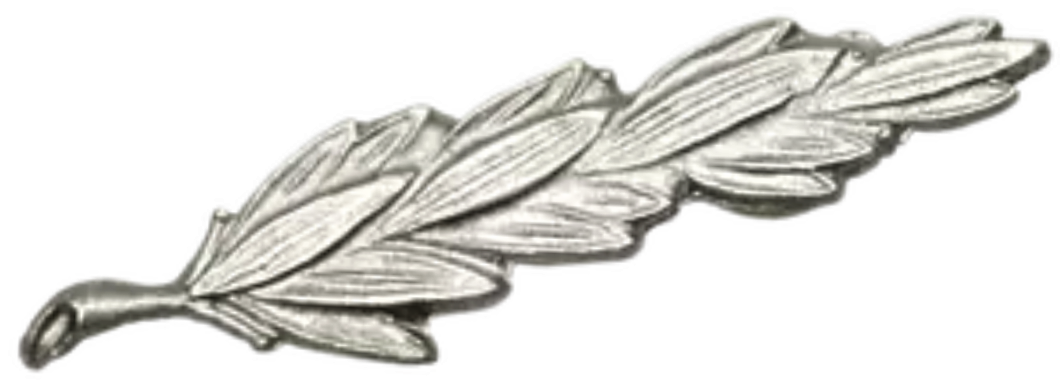
Queen's Commendation for Bravery

- Private Lewis Bradley O’Connor, The Parachute Regiment
- Chief Petty Officer Jamie Andrew Ward, Royal Navy
- Captain Lucy Elizabeth Russell, The Royal Logistic Corps
- Lance Corporal (now Retired) Fraser Alan Duncan Gee, Royal Tank Regiment

== Queen's Commendation for Valuable Service ==
Palm of the Queen's Commendation for Valuable Service

- Lieutenant Commander Andrew Dennis, Royal Navy
- Lieutenant Commander William John Durbin, Royal Navy
- Corporal Jamie Lee Found, The Parachute Regiment
- Lieutenant Colonel William Thomas Hindle Hunt, The Parachute Regiment
- Lieutenant Colonel Chloe O’Brien, The Royal Logistic Corps
- Staff Sergeant Andrea Pearson, The Royal Logistic Corps
- Captain James Nicholas Robson, The Parachute Regiment
- Captain Helene Lucie Gleizes, Intelligence Corps
- Major Hugo Peter Henderson, Royal Army Medical Corps
- Petty Officer Warfare Specialist (Electronic Warfare) Timothy Stephen Dodge, Royal Navy
- Lieutenant Commander Alexandra Katherine Harris, Royal Navy
- Leading Warfare Specialist (Underwater Warfare) Jake Ryan Hobday, Royal Navy
- Warrant Officer Class 1 Engineering Technician (Communications and Information Systems) Christopher Robbins, Royal Navy
- Staff Sergeant (now Warrant Officer Class 2) Meghann Kylie Bradbury, Queen Alexandra’s Royal Army Nursing Corps
- Captain Andrew Robert MacBeth, Royal Tank Regiment
- Corporal (now Acting Sergeant) Toyah Louise Palmer, Intelligence Corps
- Captain Helena Katheryn Richardson, Royal Regiment of Artillery
- Acting Warrant Officer Kevin Edward Jones, Royal Air Force
- Flight Lieutenant Graeme John Ritchie, Royal Air Force
- Acting Corporal Stefan Cole, Royal Army Medical Corps

== Order of St John ==
Order of St John ribbon

=== Dame Grand Cross of the Order of St John (GCStJ) ===
- Her Royal Highness The Countess of Wessex, GCVO, CD

=== Knight of the Order of St John (KStJ) ===
- Thomas Budd
- Findlay MacRae
- Lieutenant Colonel David Twigg, MBE

=== Dame of the Order of St John (DStJ) ===
- Margaret Suckling
- Jane Swainson

=== Commander of the Order of St John (CStJ) ===
- Professor Peter Kurrild-Klitgaard
- Deborah Lewis
- James Saunders Watson
- Lynn Cleal
- Florence Dewar
- William Hackett
- Vivienne Robertson
- The Right Reverend Gregory Cameron
- Simon Cole
- Dr. Bryan Craig Ellis
- Colonel (Ret’d) Stephen Franklin
- Raymond Grant Hirst
- Richard Hitchcock

=== Officer of the Order of St John (OStJ) ===
- Brigadier Stephen Archer, ARRC, QHN
- Carol Calvert
- Surgeon Captain Rikus Coetzee, RN
- Jason Peter Eldridge
- Keith Horsman
- Pamela King
- David Lewis, MBE, JP
- Wendy-Lee McCormick
- Christopher Phillips
- Jean Slater, BEM
- Ian Wand
- Jonathan Whitker, JP
- Jess Duncan
- David Gibb
- Graham Smith
- Kenneth Webster
- Richard Baxter
- Judith Goldsmith
- Andrew King
- Stephen More
- Tracy Sankey-Jones
- Helen Smith
- Claire Stone
- Ada Rheeder
- Yusuf Steytler
