= Judge Knowles =

Judge Knowles may refer to:

- Gwynneth Knowles (born 1962), judge of the Family Division of the British High Court
- Hiram Knowles (1834–1911), judge of the United States District Court for the District of Montana
- John Power Knowles (1808–1887), judge of the United States District Court for the District of Rhode Island
- Julian Knowles (judge) (born 1969), judge of the British High Court
- Kimberley S. Knowles (born 1970), associate judge on the Superior Court of the District of Columbia
- Robin Knowles (born 1960), judge of the High Court of England and Wales

== See also ==
- Justice Knowles (disambiguation)
