= Yang Tengbo =

Chinese businessman (born 1974)

- 杨腾波
- Born: 21 March 1974 (age 52); Yunnan, China
- Other name: Chris Yang
- Education: Yunnan University; University of York
- Known for: Suspected Chinese spy

Yang Tengbo (Chinese: 杨腾波, born 21 March 1974), also known as Chris Yang, is a Chinese businessman. He was barred from the United Kingdom by the Home Office in 2023 following accusations that he was using his relationship with Andrew Mountbatten-Windsor to spy for the Chinese government in the United Kingdom.

In 2024, a Special Immigration Appeals Commission tribunal upheld the decision to bar Yang, acknowledging that while there was "not an abundant quantity of evidence" against him and there may be an "innocent explanation" for some of the evidence, there was still enough material to support the Home Office's assessment that he posed a national security risk.

== Career ==
Yang was born in Yunnan, China on 21 March 1974. He graduated with a bachelor's degree in history from the School of History and Archives at Yunnan University in 1995, and subsequently became a civil servant in China.

In 2002, Yang moved to London. He studied language at a London university for one year, before taking his master's degree in Public Administration and Public Policy at the University of York. In 2005, he founded Newland UK, which originally described itself as a tour operator before becoming a business consultancy firm. In 2020, Newland UK changed its name to Hampton Group International. Hampton Group International specialised in relations between British and Chinese companies.

He is an honorary member of the 48 Group Club, a London-based private company which promotes trade between China and the United Kingdom. In an interview with state media outlet China Daily in 2022, he said that he took part in the Chinese government's Belt and Road Initiative in the United Kingdom.

== Spying allegations ==
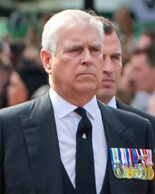
Yang came under scrutiny for his relationship with Andrew Mountbatten-Windsor.

In November 2021, Yang was stopped at a port, where a letter from Dominic Hampshire, an adviser to Andrew Mountbatten-Windsor, was found on his devices. The letter referenced Yang being invited to Andrew's birthday party. Of Yang's relationship with Andrew, Hampshire wrote, "I also hope that it is clear to you where you sit with my principal ... Outside of his closest internal confidants, you sit at the very top of a tree that many, many people would like to be on." Yang was Andrew's guest at Buckingham Palace, St James's Palace and Windsor Castle. Another document found included details of the "main talking points" for a telephone call between Yang and Andrew. It described Andrew as being in a "desperate situation", saying that he would "grab on to anything".

In March 2023, Suella Braverman, then Home Secretary, barred Yang from the United Kingdom. He appealed to the Special Immigration Appeals Commission (SIAC) in July. The judges heard that in a briefing to Braverman, officials said that Yang's unique relationship with Andrew "could be leveraged for political interference purposes by the Chinese State". The challenge was dismissed, and the Home Office confirmed that Yang would be barred from the UK as he was considered to have carried out "covert and deceptive activity" on behalf of the CCP. The Home Office believed that Yang may have been working for the United Front Work Department (UFWD).

In August 2023, Yang submitted a second appeal to the SIAC against the decision. Hearings took place in July 2024. The tribunal heard that Yang had claimed to have only limited links to the Chinese state, and that he been told by one of Andrew's advisors that he could deal with potential investors in China on Andrew's behalf. In December, judge Charles Bourne, judge Stephen Smith and Stewart Eldon dismissed the challenge. They found that "[Yang] won a significant degree, one could say an unusual degree, of trust from a senior member of the royal family ... It is obvious that the pressures on the duke could make him vulnerable to the misuse of that sort of influence". Their ruling acknowledged that there was "not an abundance of evidence" for links between Yang and the UFWD, although there was evidence to suggest that he had downplayed his relationship with the Chinese Communist Party. They ultimately ruled that Braverman "was entitled to conclude that [Yang's] exclusion was justified and proportionate". After the ruling, Andrew's office stated that he had "ceased all contact" with Yang, and that the two had only ever met "through official channels, with nothing of a sensitive nature ever discussed".

On 16 December 2024, High Court judge Martin Chamberlain ruled that Yang could be publicly named. Prior to this, he had only been known as "H6". Later the same day, Yang issued a statement through his lawyers, saying that he requested the lifting of the secrecy order "due to the high level of speculation and misreporting." He said that "The widespread description of me as a 'spy' is entirely untrue", and pointed out that "even the three judges in this case concluded that there was 'not an abundance of evidence'" and "there could be an 'innocent explanation'" for his activities. He claimed that his exclusion was the result of a poor "political climate" resulting in an "anti-China stance", and said that he "would never do anything to harm the interests of the UK."

Yang has met former prime ministers David Cameron and Theresa May, and former chancellor of the exchequer George Osborne.

== See also ==
- United front
- Chinese intelligence activity abroad
- Christine Lee
- List of people banned from entering the United Kingdom
