= Justice Knowles =

Justice Knowles may refer to:

- Gwynneth Knowles (born 1962), judge of the British High Court, Family Division
- Leonard Knowles (1916–1999), first chief justice of an independent Bahamas
- Robin Knowles (born 1960), judge of the High Court of England and Wales

== See also ==
- Judge Knowles (disambiguation)
