= Bradford Girls' Choir =

UK musical group

- Choir
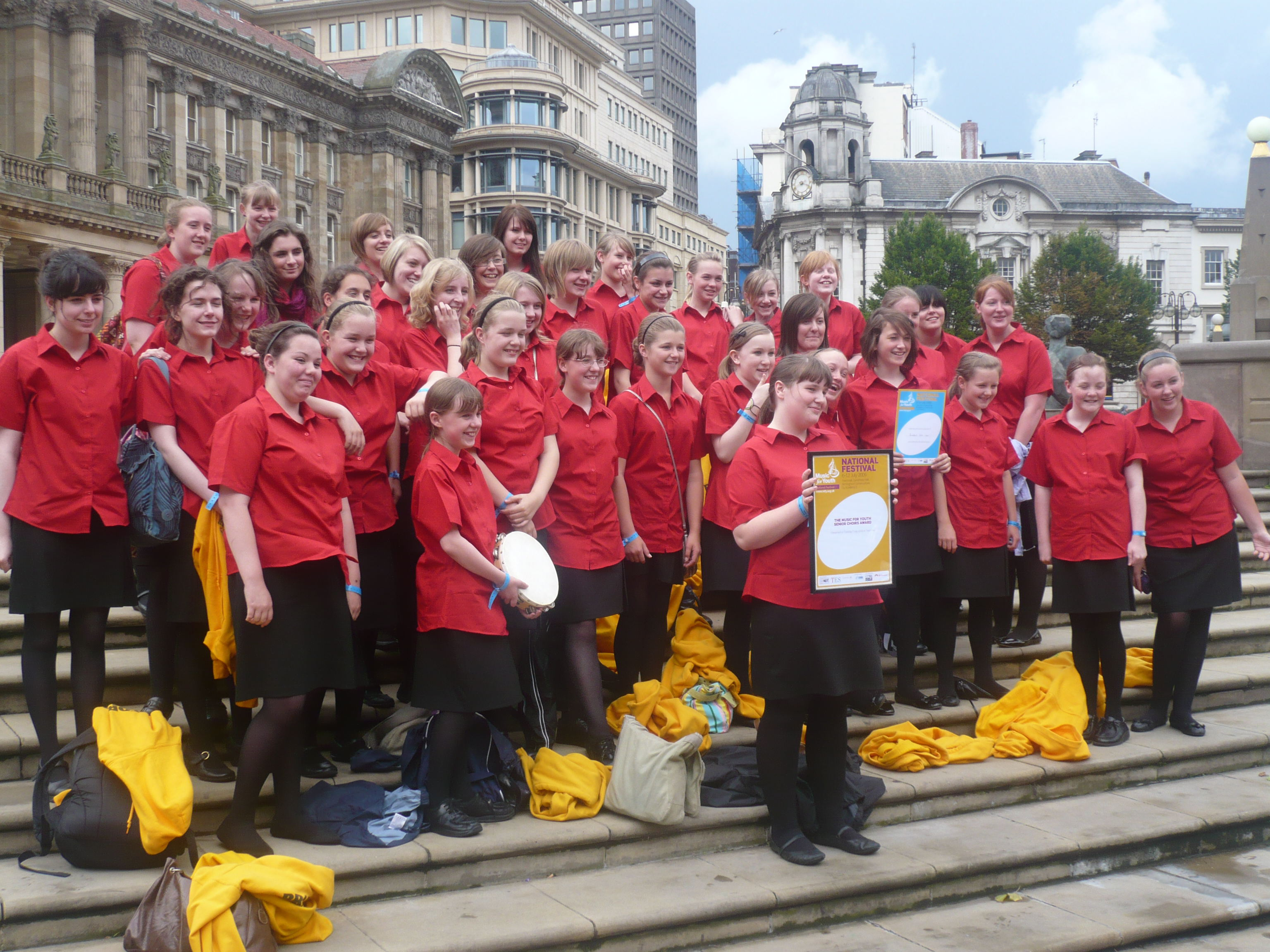
- The Bradford Girls' Choir pictured at the Music for Youth Concerts in Birmingham 2009
- Origin: Bradford and Keighley
- Founded: June 2006
- Genre: Church choir
- Members: 35 auditioned
- Director: Thomas Leech
- Affiliation: Roman Catholic Diocese of Leeds
- Awards: Music for Youth Senior choirs', Birmingham, July 2009
- Website: www.dioceseofleedsmusic.org.uk/bradford_keighley_choirs/girls.php

Bradford Girls Choir
Sample from the CD "Jubilate Deo"

The Bradford Catholic Girls' Choir was formed in 2006. It has 35 members of girls aged between 10 and 18 from Keighley and Bradford schools under the direction of Thomas Leech. It is part of the Leeds Diocese Schools Singing Programme, the largest choir outreach programme in Britain.

The girls have performed twice at the Llangollen International Musical Eisteddfod, finishing 5th in 2009 as the highest-placed UK choir. The choir was awarded the Music for Youth Senior choirs' award for their outstanding musicianship in Birmingham in July 2009.

The girls have appeared on Songs of Praise on the BBC as well as numerous radio performances. Together with the Bradford Catholic Boys' Choir, the choir has recorded a CD, Jubilate Deo.

The choir performed several concerts in France in June 2008, performing in Paris and Lourdes and again in France at the 9èmes Rencontres Internationales de Choeurs d'Enfants Festival in April 2010. In July 2014, they competed in the World Choir Games, held in Riga, Latvia.

== Sources ==
- Diocese of leeds, Music department
- David Knights (14 May 2010), "Pope Choir in Concert", Keighley News
- David Knights (30 July 2009), "Holy Family girls on top voice", Keighley News
- Dan Webber (7 July 2008), "Girls head off to take on the world", Bradford Telegraph and Argus
