= Charles Erdman =

Charles Erdman(n) may refer to:

- Charles R. Erdman Sr. (1866–1960), American minister and theologian
- Charles R. Erdman Jr. (1897–1984), American politician
- Charles E. Erdmann (born 1946), American jurist
- Charles Christian Erdmann, Duke of Württemberg-Oels (1716–1792)

== See also ==
- Charles Erdman Petersdorff (1800–1886), British legal writer
