= Barry Cotter =

Barry Cotter is the name of:

- Barry Cotter (footballer)
- Barry Cotter (judge)
