= Kelyn Bacon =

British judge (born 1973)

The Honourable Mrs Justice Bacon DBE
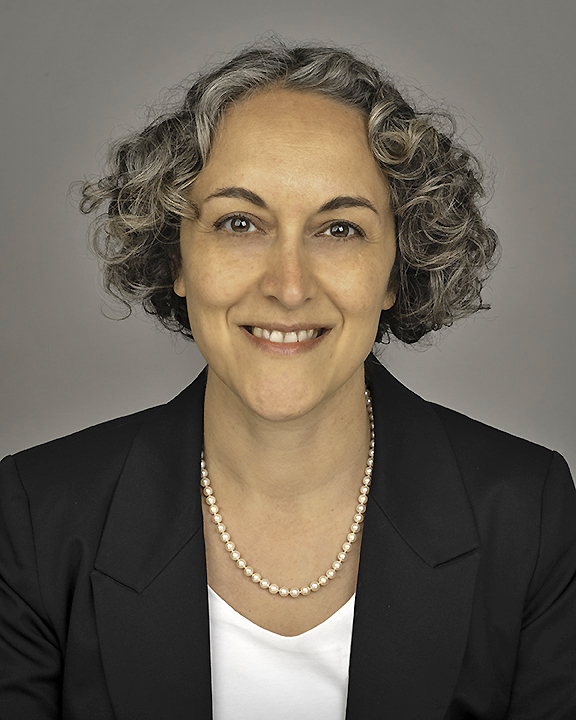
- Bacon in 2020

Justice of the High Court
- Incumbent
- Assumed office 1 October 2020
- Monarchs: Elizabeth II; Charles III

Personal details
- Born: 29 October 1973 (age 52) Bombay, India
- Education: European University Institute; Merton College, Oxford

Dame Kelyn Meher Bacon Darwin, DBE (née Bacon; born 29 October 1973) is a British High Court judge.

Bacon was born in Bombay, India and was educated at state schools in Somerset, England. She studied at Merton College, Oxford where she graduated with an MA in law with law studies in Europe in 1996, attending the University of Konstanz in Germany. She attended the European University Institute in Florence, Italy and graduated with an LLM in European law in 1997. She completed her barrister vocational training at the Inns of Court School of Law in 1998.

Bacon was called to the bar at the Inner Temple in 1998 and practised EU and competition law from Brick Court Chambers after completing her pupillage there in 1999. She took silk in 2014 and was appointed a deputy High Court judge in 2017. In addition to practice, she wrote European Community Law of State Aid in 2009 and the third edition of European Law of State Aid in 2017.

On 1 October 2020, Bacon was appointed a judge of the High Court, replacing Sir Gerald Barling who retired, and she was assigned to the Chancery Division. She received the customary damehood in the same year. She is President of the Upper Tribunal (Tax and Chancery Chamber).

In 2003, she married Peter Darwin and together they have a son and a daughter.
