= Sue Carr, Baroness Carr of Walton-on-the-Hill =

British jurist and life peer (born 1964)

The Right Honourable The Baroness Carr of Walton-on-the-Hill DBE PC KC
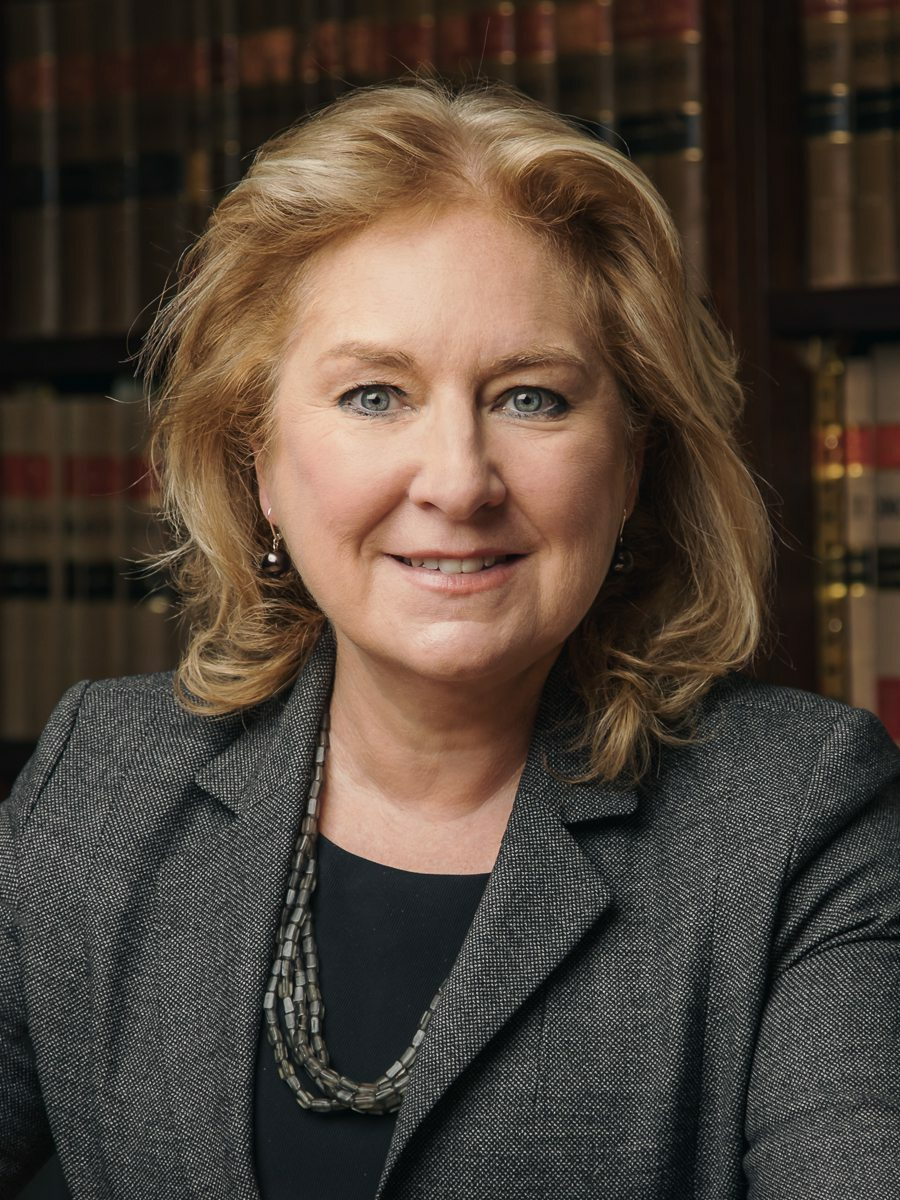
- Carr in 2022

Lady Chief Justice of England and Wales
- Incumbent
- Assumed office 1 October 2023
- Nominated by: Alex Chalk
- Appointed by: Charles III
- Preceded by: The Lord Burnett of Maldon

Lady Justice of Appeal
- In office 21 April 2020 – 30 September 2023

Justice of the High Court
- In office 14 June 2013 – 20 April 2020
- Preceded by: Mr Justice Stadlen
- Succeeded by: Mr Justice Calver

Member of the House of Lords
- Lord Temporal
- Life peerage 6 November 2023 (Note: As a serving senior judge, Carr is currently disqualified from sitting in the House of Lords.)

Personal details
- Born: Sue Lascelles Carr; 1 September 1964 (age 62) United Kingdom
- Spouse: Alexander Birch (m. 1993)
- Children: 3
- Parent: Richard Carr (father)
- Education: Trinity College, Cambridge

Sue Lascelles Carr, Baroness Carr of Walton-on-the-Hill (born 1 September 1964), is an English jurist and life peer who has served as Lady Chief Justice of England and Wales since 2023. She is the first woman to serve as the head of the judiciary of England and Wales since the inception of the office of Lord Chief Justice in the 13th century. Carr previously served as a High Court judge from 2013 to 2020 and a Lady Justice of Appeal from 2020 to 2023.

== Early life and education ==
Carr was born on 1 September 1964 to businessman Richard Carr and Edda Harvey (née Armbrust). She was educated at Wycombe Abbey, an independent girls' school in Buckinghamshire. At Wycombe Abbey, Carr was a member of the lacrosse team, sang in the school choir, and played the piano and the viola, choosing the latter instrument because "it would maximise [her] chances of getting into the School orchestra". She later served as a governor of the school for 13 years.

Carr read modern languages and law at Trinity College, Cambridge.

== Legal career ==
Carr was called to the bar in 1987 and practised from 4 New Square Chambers. She was appointed Queen's Counsel in 2003. On 6 May 2009, Carr was appointed a recorder, and was approved to serve as a deputy High Court judge.

Carr was the chairman of the Professional Negligence Bar Association in 2007 and 2008, and the chairman of the Conduct Committee of the Bar Standards Board from 2008 to 2011. In April 2011, Carr was appointed Disciplinary Commissioner in proceedings before the International Criminal Court.

== Judicial Career ==
On 14 June 2013, Carr was appointed a High Court judge in the room of Mr Justice Stadlen, receiving the customary appointment as Dame Commander of the Most Excellent Order of the British Empire (DBE) in 2014. She was assigned to the Queen's Bench Division of the High Court. She was a member of the board of the Judicial College from 2014 to 2018, and served as a member of the Investigatory Powers Tribunal from 2014 to 2016. Carr is a governing bencher of the Inner Temple.

Carr was appointed to the Court of Appeal on 21 April 2020, and was succeeded as a High Court judge by Mr Justice Calver. Carr was sworn of the Privy Council on 28 April 2021.

== Lady Chief Justice of England and Wales ==
On 15 June 2023, Carr's appointment as Lord Chief Justice of England and Wales was announced. She became the first woman to head the judiciary of England and Wales since the inception of the office in the 13th century. Carr chose to be styled Lady Chief Justice and succeeded Lord Burnett of Maldon on 1 October. Her swearing-in on 2 October was the first time that the ceremony was livestreamed. On 6 November, she was created a life peer as Baroness Carr of Walton-on-the-Hill, of Walton-on-the-Hill in the County of Surrey. She was introduced to the House of Lords on 30 November.

=== Gaza immigration ruling controversy ===
In February 2025, Lady Chief Justice Carr issued a rare public rebuke to Prime Minister Sir Keir Starmer and Conservative leader Kemi Badenoch after they denounced a tribunal decision granting a Palestinian family from Gaza asylum in the UK. The family of six had successfully appealed on Article 8 ECHR family life grounds to join their British citizen brother.

During Prime Minister's Questions on 12 February 2025, Badenoch called the Upper Tribunal's decision "completely wrong" and "cannot be allowed to stand". Starmer agreed: "I do not agree with the decision. She's right, it is the wrong decision". He asserted "Parliament should make the rules on immigration" and announced Home Secretary Yvette Cooper was working to close the "loophole".

Carr responded on 18 February 2025 that she was "deeply troubled", stating "both the question and the answer were unacceptable". She emphasized that "it is for the government visibly to respect and protect the independence of the judiciary" and that disagreements should be pursued through the appellate process. The Bar Council supported Carr, stating: "All politicians should protect the independence of the judiciary, not criticise the judges who act according to the laws made by Parliament". Carr revealed she had written to the Lord Chancellor, noting concerns over judicial security were at an "all-time high" and that "it is not acceptable for judges to be the subject of personal attacks for doing no more than their jobs".

=== Palestine Action ===
The government had declared support for Palestine Action as illegal and they created a dedicated (and slower) legal route of appeal in 2025. Huda Ammori, co-founder of the group, applied to ignore the new route and to apply for a judicial review which the government opposed. Carr in the Court of Appeal sided with Ammori in mid October 2025. By this time over 2,100 people had been arrested. Carr blocked an application by the government to prevent Ammori from appealing the decision using normal procedures rather than the governments recommended (slower) route. She said it was a "quicker means of challenging the order proscribing Palestine Action, than applying to deproscribe". Ammori claimed the case has "backfired spectacularly" as the court allowed her to add additional grounds to appeal the Home Office's ban.

== Personal life ==
Carr married Alexander Birch in 1993. They have two sons and a daughter.

== Notes ==
Legal offices
Preceded by The Lord Burnett of Maldon as Lord Chief Justice	Lady Chief Justice of England and Wales; 2023–present	Incumbent
Order of precedence in England and Wales
Preceded by Sarah Mullally as Archbishop of Canterbury	Ladies as Lady Chief Justice of England and Wales	Succeeded by The Baroness Smith of Basildon as Lord Keeper of the Privy Seal
