= Thomas Dickson Archibald (judge) =

Canadian jurist (1817–1876)

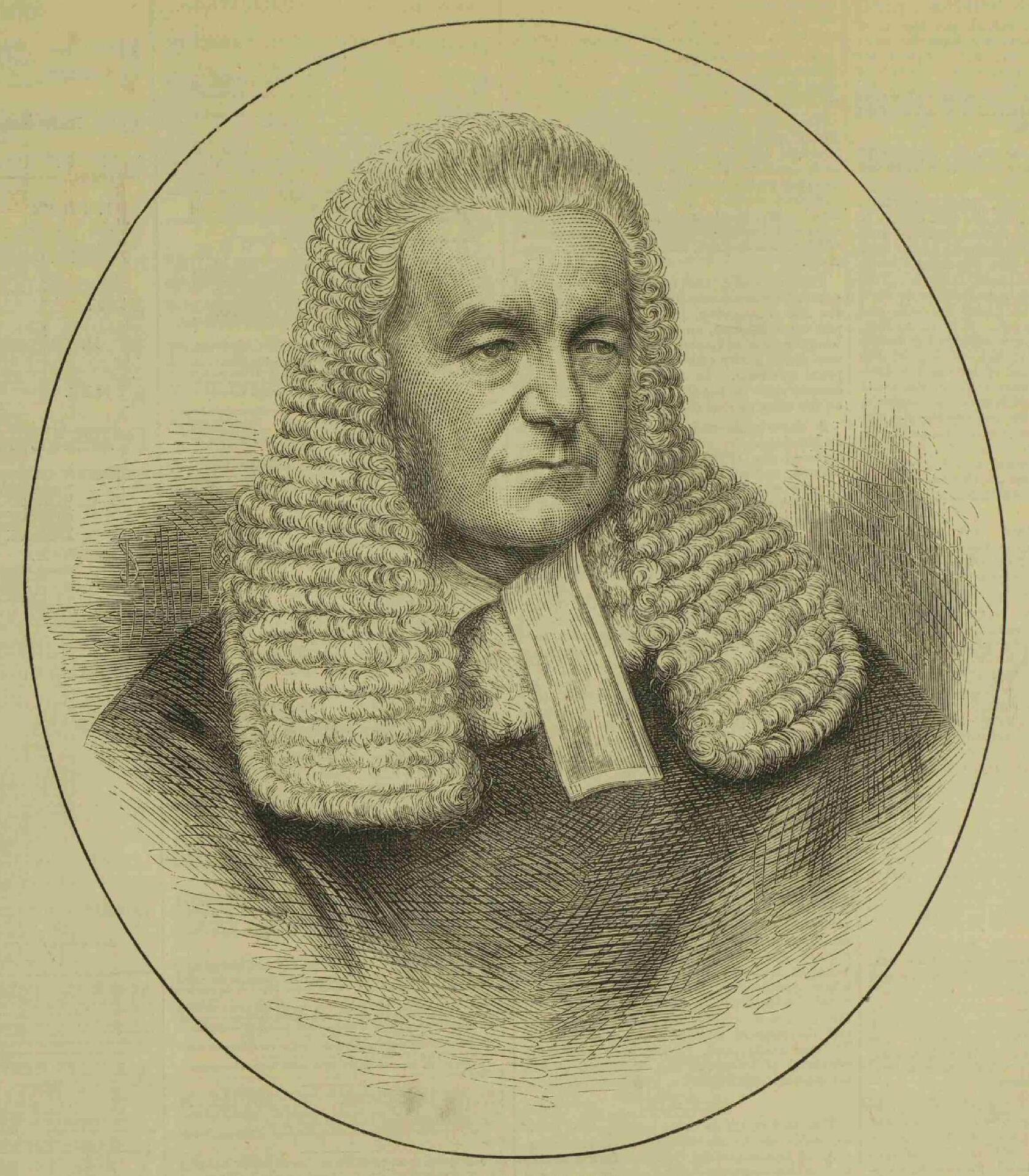
- Born: 23 August 1817; Truro
- Died: 18 October 1876 (aged 59); London
- Spouse(s): Sarah Smith
- Children: at least 4
- Parent(s): Samuel George William Archibald; Elizabeth Dickson

Sir Thomas Dickson Archibald (1817–1876) was judge of the High Court of Justice (Common Pleas Division) and lawyer from Nova Scotia. He served from 6 February 1875 until 1 November 1875.

== Life ==
Archibald was born in 1817, the sixth son of nineteen children, to Samuel George Williams Archibald and Elizabeth Archibald. His grandfather was Charles Dickson of Onslow, Canada.

Although he originally studied to be a surgeon at Pictou Presbyterian College, Archibald quickly switched to law and qualified as an attorney and barrister in 1837. Following his degree, he toured Europe and, in 1838, met his future wife, Sarah, in England. Her father, Richard Smith, a former Nova Scotian assembly manager, gave his consent to the marriage only if the couple agreed to stay in England. Sarah and Thomas had at least four children.

In 1840, Archibald joined the Middle Temple and was called to the bar on 30 January 1852. He originally practised law in the northern circuit but later switched to the home circuit. As an attorney Archibald was praised by Serjeant Petersdorff for his work on the Common Law Abridgement.

In 1868, he was appointed junior counsel to the Treasury. In 1872, he was appointed to the Court of Queen's Bench and became a Sergeant-at-Law, succeeding Sir James Jannen.

He became a knight on 5 February 1873 and the next day was transferred to the Court of Common Pleas. In 1875, after the Court of Common Pleas was abolished, he became a Justice of the High Court.

== Death ==
Archibald died on 18 October 1876 in his home in Hyde Park, London.
