= Ian Burnett, Baron Burnett of Maldon =

British jurist (born 1958)

The Right Honourable The Lord Burnett of Maldon KG PC DL
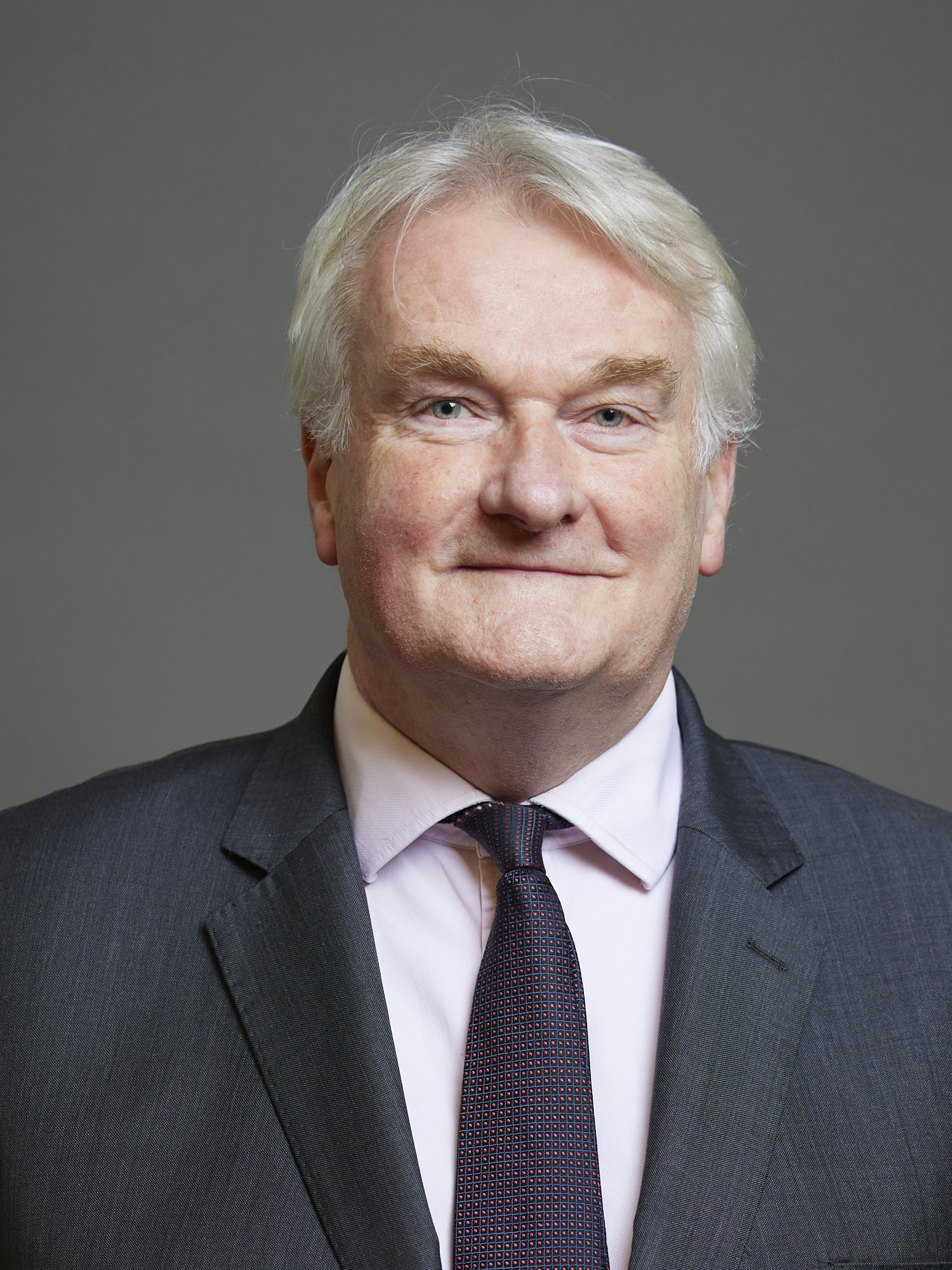
- Official portrait, 2022

Lord Chief Justice of England and Wales
- In office 2 October 2017 – 30 September 2023
- Nominated by: David Lidington
- Appointed by: Elizabeth II
- Preceded by: The Lord Thomas of Cwmgiedd
- Succeeded by: The Baroness Carr of Walton-on-the-Hill

Lord Justice of Appeal
- In office 2014–2017

Judge of the High Court
- In office 2008–2014

Member of the House of Lords
- Lord Temporal
- Life peerage 30 October 2017

Personal details
- Born: 28 February 1958 (age 68) Worthing, Sussex, England
- Spouse: Caroline Ruth Monks (m. 1991)
- Education: Pembroke College, Oxford

Ian Duncan Burnett, Baron Burnett of Maldon, KG, PC, DL (born 28 February 1958), is a British jurist who served as Lord Chief Justice of England and Wales from 2017 to 2023. In 2026, he was appointed a Knight Companion of the Order of the Garter by King Charles III.

== Early life and education ==
Burnett was born on 28 February 1958. He was educated at St John's College, Portsmouth, and studied jurisprudence at Pembroke College, Oxford, where he became an honorary fellow in 2008.

== Legal career ==
He was called to the bar at Middle Temple in 1980, and was elected a bencher there in 2001. From 1982, he practised at Temple Garden Chambers. He was head of those chambers from 2003. He was appointed Queen's Counsel in 1998. He practised mainly in public and administrative law, acting on the inquiries into the 1987 King's Cross fire, the convictions of the Guildford Four and Maguire Seven, the 1997 Southall and 1999 Ladbroke Grove rail crashes, and the inquests into the 1997 deaths of Diana, Princess of Wales, and Dodi Fayed.

Burnett was an assistant recorder from 1998 to 2000, and then a recorder until 2008. He was authorised to sit as a Judge of the High Court from 2008 (Supreme Court Act 1981, s 9(1)). He was appointed as a Judge of the High Court in 2008, assigned to the Queen's Bench Division. He was knighted on 7 November 2008. He sat in the Administrative Court and was presiding Judge of the Western Circuit 2011–14. He was promoted to the Court of Appeal in 2014, becoming a Lord Justice of Appeal.

It was announced in July 2017 that he would replace Lord Thomas of Cwmgiedd as Lord Chief Justice of England and Wales from 2 October 2017.

Aged 59, he became the youngest Lord Chief Justice since Lord Parker of Waddington in 1958. On 12 October 2017, it was announced that Burnett was to receive a life peerage. He was duly created Baron Burnett of Maldon, of Maldon in the County of Essex, on 30 October 2017.

In November 2022, Burnett announced his intention to retire as Lord Chief Justice from 30 September 2023. He was succeeded by Baroness Carr of Walton-on-the-Hill as Lady Chief Justice.

In 2023, he was made Chief Justice of the Astana International Financial Centre Court, an international commercial court in Kazakhstan. He has served on the Constitution Committee of the House of Lords since 2024.

== Honours ==
Knight Companion of the Order of the Garter (KG)	23 April 2026
Queen's Counsel (QC)	1998
Baron	30 October 2017
Knight Bachelor	28 October 2008
Member of Her Majesty's Most Honourable Privy Council (PC)	20 November 2014
Deputy Lieutenant of the County of Essex (DL)	24 May 2024

== Personal life ==
Burnett married Caroline Ruth Monks in 1991. They have one son and one daughter. He was appointed a deputy lieutenant of Essex in 2024.

Legal offices
Preceded by The Lord Thomas of Cwmgiedd	Lord Chief Justice; 2017–2023	Succeeded by The Baroness Carr of Walton-on-the-Hill as Lady Chief Justice
Order of precedence in England and Wales
Preceded by The Lord Agnew of Oulton	Gentlemen; Baron Burnett of Maldon	Succeeded by The Lord Geidt
