= Handsworth Grange Community Sports College =

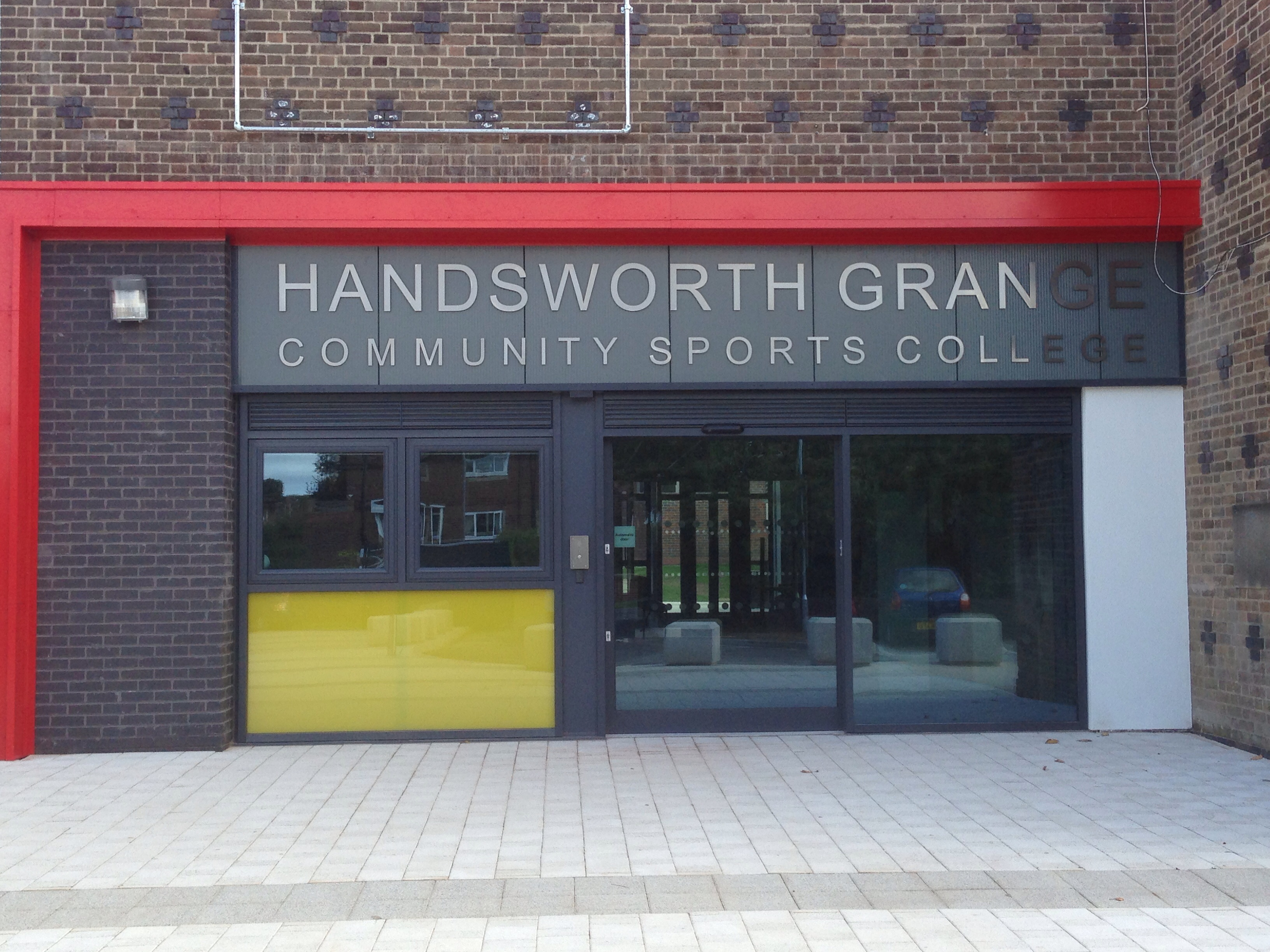

Location
- Handsworth Grange Road; Sheffield, South Yorkshire, S13 9HJ; England
- 53.3682°N 1.3744°W

Information
- Type: Academy
- Local authority: Sheffield
- Department for Education URN: 141495 Tables
- Ofsted: Reports
- Chair: Ed Wydenbach
- Headteacher: Suzy Mattock
- Staff: 73
- Gender: Coeducational
- Age: 11 to 16
- Enrolment: 1,010
- Houses: 4
- Website: http://www.hgcsc.co.uk/

Handsworth Grange Community Sports College also known as Handsworth Grange School is an academy and part of the Minerva Learning Trust. It is located in Sheffield, South Yorkshire, England. The school educates over 1,000 pupils. The building was previously the site of Beaver Hill Comprehensive, but the school changed its name when it amalgamated with Brook School.

== School organisation ==
School was designated "outstanding" by OFSTED in 2017. GCSE results had risen for 6 years in a row making the school one of the most improved schools in Sheffield over the last few years. The school converted to academy status in October 2014. Since the conversion to an academy the results have taken a dramatic drop down to 41% 5A*-C from the 2014 figure of 60%, and the 2013 peak of 63%. The school failed to make these results public to the media on results day, but did release a "Progress 8" figure a year earlier than required of +0.23.

on 22 November 2022 the school was rated by OFSTED "requires improvement" for lack of Personal development and "requires improvement" on Leadership and management and Behaviour and attitudes

https://files.ofsted.gov.uk/v1/file/50205607

== Awards ==
The school won a KS4 Pupil Premium award in 2015 for the progress made with disadvantaged pupils.

== Official visits ==
Handsworth Grange is one of several schools in the city to house a multi-functional Sports College. A new gym was adapted as part of a national inclusive fitness initiative to enable people with disabilities to have the same facilities as those who are able bodied. It was opened, in July 2005, by the Minister of Sport Richard Caborn. A number of summer numeracy schools have been established to bridge the gap in maths standards between primary and secondary levels. Secretary of State for Education and Employment David Blunkett visited the school, in order to examine their scheme, in August 1999.
