= Adam Johnson (judge) =

British judge (born 1965)

The Honourable Mr Justice Adam Johnson
- Royal coat of arms of the United Kingdom

Justice of the High Court
- Incumbent
- Assumed office 01 October 2020

Personal details
- Born: 4 October 1965 (age 61) Sheffield, England
- Education: Churchill College, Cambridge

Sir Adam Martin Johnson (born 4 October 1965) is a British High Court judge and a member of the Judicial Appointments Commission.

Johnson was born in Sheffield, England and attended Beaver Hill Comprehensive. He attended Churchill College, Cambridge and graduated with a BA in 1987. He was the first in his family to attend university.

In 1990, Johnson was admitted as a solicitor and joined Herbert Smith Freehills where he specialised in commercial litigation. He was an associate from 1990 to 1997, then he was made partner in 1997. He took silk in 2017 and was appointed a deputy High Court judge in 2018.

On 2 October 2020, Johnson was appointed a judge of the High Court, replacing Sir Henry Carr who had died, and he was assigned to the Chancery Division. He received the customary knighthood in the same year.

In 1996, he married Jennifer and together they have a son and two daughters.
