= Thomas Linden =

British judge

The Honourable Mr Justice Linden
- Royal coat of arms of the United Kingdom

Justice of the High Court
- Incumbent
- Assumed office 13 January 2020
- Monarchs: Elizabeth II; Charles III

Personal details
- Born: 26 November 1964 (age 61) London, England
- Education: Keble College, Oxford

Sir Thomas Dominic Linden (born 26 November 1964) is a British High Court judge.

== Early life and education ==
Linden was born in London in 1964 and educated at Beechen Cliff School in Bath and St Brendan's Sixth Form College in Bristol. He studied jurisprudence at Keble College, Oxford, graduating with a first-class BA in 1987, and he completed the BCL there in 1988.

== Career ==
He was called to the bar at Gray's Inn, practising employment, discrimination and sports law from Matrix Chambers, of which he was a founding member in 2000.

As a practitioner, he appeared before the Court of Appeal, the United Kingdom Supreme Court and the European Court of Justice. He was appointed a recorder in 2005 and took silk in 2006. He was appointed a deputy High Court judge in 2019.

=== High Court appointment ===
On 13 January 2020, was appointed a judge of the High Court, replacing Sir Andrew Popplewell who was promoted to the Court of Appeal; Linden assigned to the Queen's Bench Division. In 2022, he was knighted.

== Personal life ==
In 1991, he married Dr. Brigit Connolly; they have four daughters.
