= Rolls-Royce India =

Indian subsidiary of Rolls-Royce Holdings

Rolls-Royce India Private Limited is an Indian subsidiary of Rolls-Royce Holdings.

The subsidiary looks after the regional client base as well as the supply chain for its aeronautics and industrial businesses. The Bengaluru office focuses on R&D works on Jet engines for civil aerospace.

The company has been present in India for over 80 years. Today, Rolls-Royce is supplier of power systems across aerospace, marine, nuclear and power systems

Rolls-Royce has engineering centres in Bengaluru and Pune and operations based in Mumbai and Chennai.

Rolls-Royce has a joint venture with Hindustan Aeronautics Ltd – International Aerospace Manufacturing Pvt. Ltd – to manufactures engine components including compressor shrouds and cones for gas turbines .
