= Neil Calver =

British judge

The Honourable Mr Justice Calver
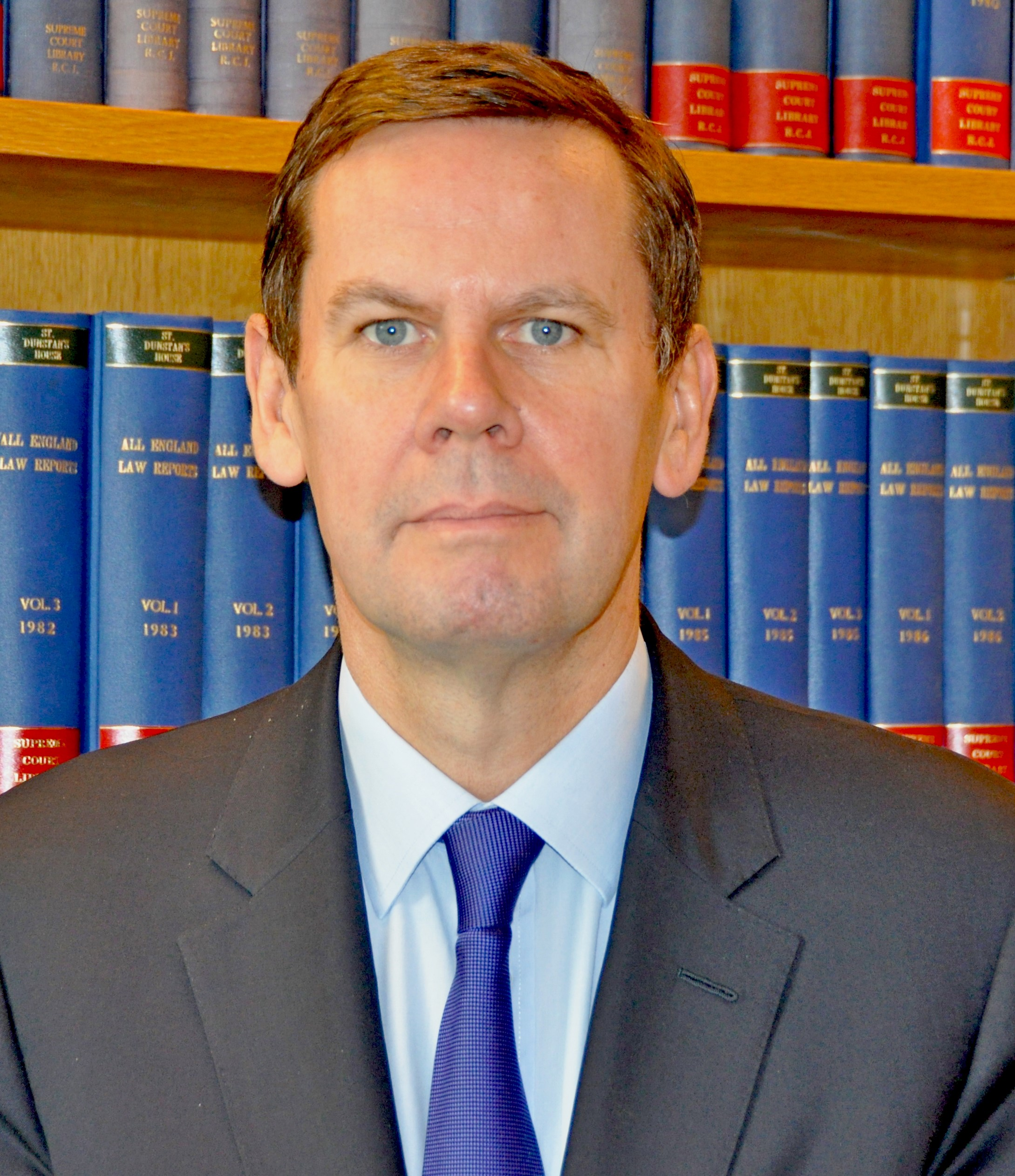
- Calver in 2022

Justice of the High Court
- Incumbent
- Assumed office 1 October 2020
- Monarch: Elizabeth II

Personal details
- Born: 4 September 1963 (age 63) United Kingdom
- Education: Christ's College, Cambridge

Sir Neil Richard Calver (born 4 September 1963) is a British High Court judge.

He was educated at Dartford Grammar School and was a chess champion in the Kent area at under-18 and other levels. He completed a first-class BA degree in law at Christ's College, Cambridge, in 1986.

He was called to the bar at Gray's Inn in 1987 and practised commercial and European law, initially from 4–5 Gray's Inn Square and then Brick Court Chambers from 1994. He took silk in 2006 and was appointed a recorder in 2009.

On 1 October 2020, he was appointed a judge of the High Court, replacing Dame Sue Carr who was promoted to the Court of Appeal, and he was assigned to the Queen's Bench Division. He received the customary knighthood in the same year. He sits on the Commercial Court, Admiralty Court and Administrative Court, and also hears criminal cases. In 2025, he was appointed Presiding Judge for the South Eastern region of England from 1 January 2026.

In 2009, he married Marie-Eleni Demetriou (a fellow barrister) and together they have a son and a daughter. He has another daughter from a previous marriage. He supports Charlton Athletic FC and recreationally mountain climbs.
