= Martin Chamberlain =

British judge

The Honourable Mr Justice Chamberlain
- Royal coat of arms of the United Kingdom

High Court Judge King's Bench Division
- Incumbent
- Assumed office 1 October 2019
- Monarchs: Elizabeth II; Charles III

Personal details
- Born: 25 November 1973 (age 52) Edinburgh, Scotland
- Education: City University of London; University College, Oxford

Sir Martin Daniel Chamberlain (born 25 November 1973) is a British High Court judge.

== Early life end education ==
Chamberlain was born in Edinburgh, Scotland and educated at Stewart's Melville College in Edinburgh. He studied at University College, Oxford, completing a BA in 1994. In 1994, he attended City University of London and completed a graduate diploma in law, then returned to University College and completed the BCL in 1996. He was an Eldon Scholar in 1997.

== Career ==
Chamberlain was called to the bar at Middle Temple in 1997 and joined Brick Court Chambers in 2000 where he practised public law and human rights. As a practitioner, he appeared before European Court of Justice and the European Court of Human Rights and served as a special advocate in national security cases from 2003. He took silk in 2013. From 2011 to 2020, he appeared joint third most at the Supreme Court of the United Kingdom with 24 appearances; he was behind Richard Drabble with 28 and the Treasury Devil Sir James Eadie with 65.

In an interview in The Times, he called for the UK to adopt an equivalent of the United States' First Amendment, saying the European Convention of Human Rights as included in UK law was too weak. He also served as chair of the Constitutional and Administrative Law Bar Association. He was appointed a deputy High Court judge in 2016.

=== High Court appointment ===
On 1 October 2019, Chamberlain was appointed a judge of the High Court at the age of 45 and assigned to the Queen's Bench Division. He received the customary knighthood in the same year. In 2019, he was part of the High Court who decided the Metropolitan Police's ban of Extinction Rebellion's 2019 protests was unlawful. He has participated regularly in the preparation of the Administrative Court Judicial Review Guide.

== Personal life ==
In 2001, he married Samantha Broadfoot (a recorder and fellow KC), with whom he has a son and two daughters.
