= Andrew Henshaw =

British judge

The Honourable Mr Justice Henshaw
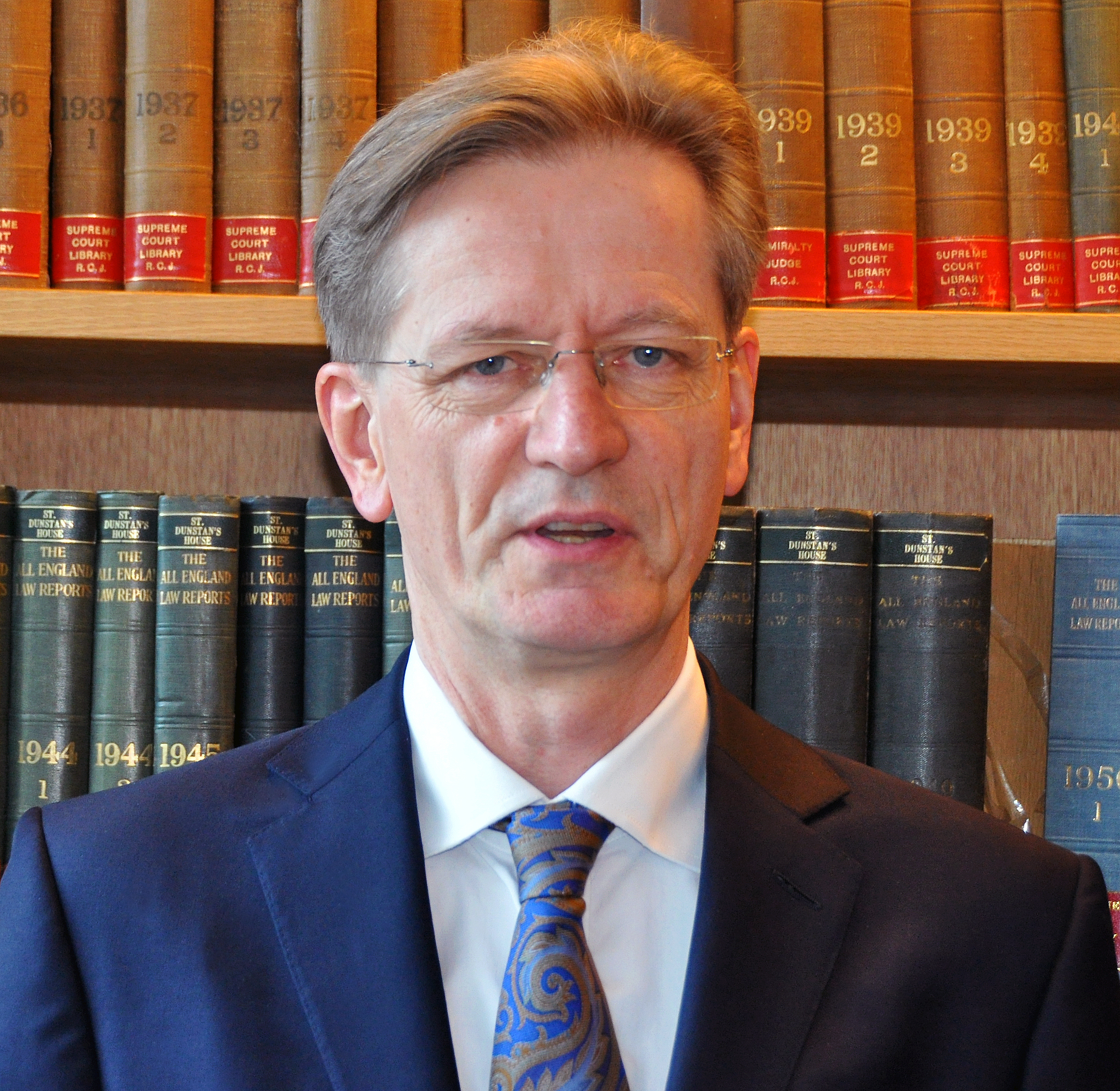
- Henshaw in 2022

High Court Judge King's Bench Division
- Incumbent
- Assumed office 2 December 2019
- Monarchs: Elizabeth II; Charles III

Personal details
- Born: 22 April 1962 (age 64) Towcester, England
- Education: Downing College, Cambridge

Sir Andrew Raymond Henshaw (born 22 April 1962) is a British High Court judge.

== Early life and education ==
Henshaw was born in Towcester, Northamptonshire, England and was educated at Sponne School in Towcester. He attended Downing College, Cambridge and graduated with a BA in law in 1983. He was the first in his family to attend university.

== Career ==
In 1986, he was admitted as a solicitor and worked for Linklaters from 1986 to 2000 as a litigator; from 1987 to 1986, he was seconded to Steptoe & Johnson in Washington, D.C. At Linklaters, he made partner in 1994 and qualified as a solicitor advocate in 1996. He was called to the bar at Inner Temple in 2000, and established a practice in commercial and public law based at Brick Court Chambers. He took silk in 2013 and was appointed a deputy High Court judge in 2017.

=== High Court appointment ===
On 2 December 2019, he was appointed a judge of the High Court and assigned to the Queen's Bench Division. He received the customary knighthood in the same year. He sits on the Commercial Court, Admiralty Court, Administrative Court and sits on criminal cases in the Crown Court and Court of Appeal (Criminal Division).

== Personal life ==
In 1998, he married Claire O'Connor, with whom he has two sons and a daughter.
