= Khaled Al-Duwaisan =

Kuwaiti diplomat (born 1947)

- خالد الدويسان
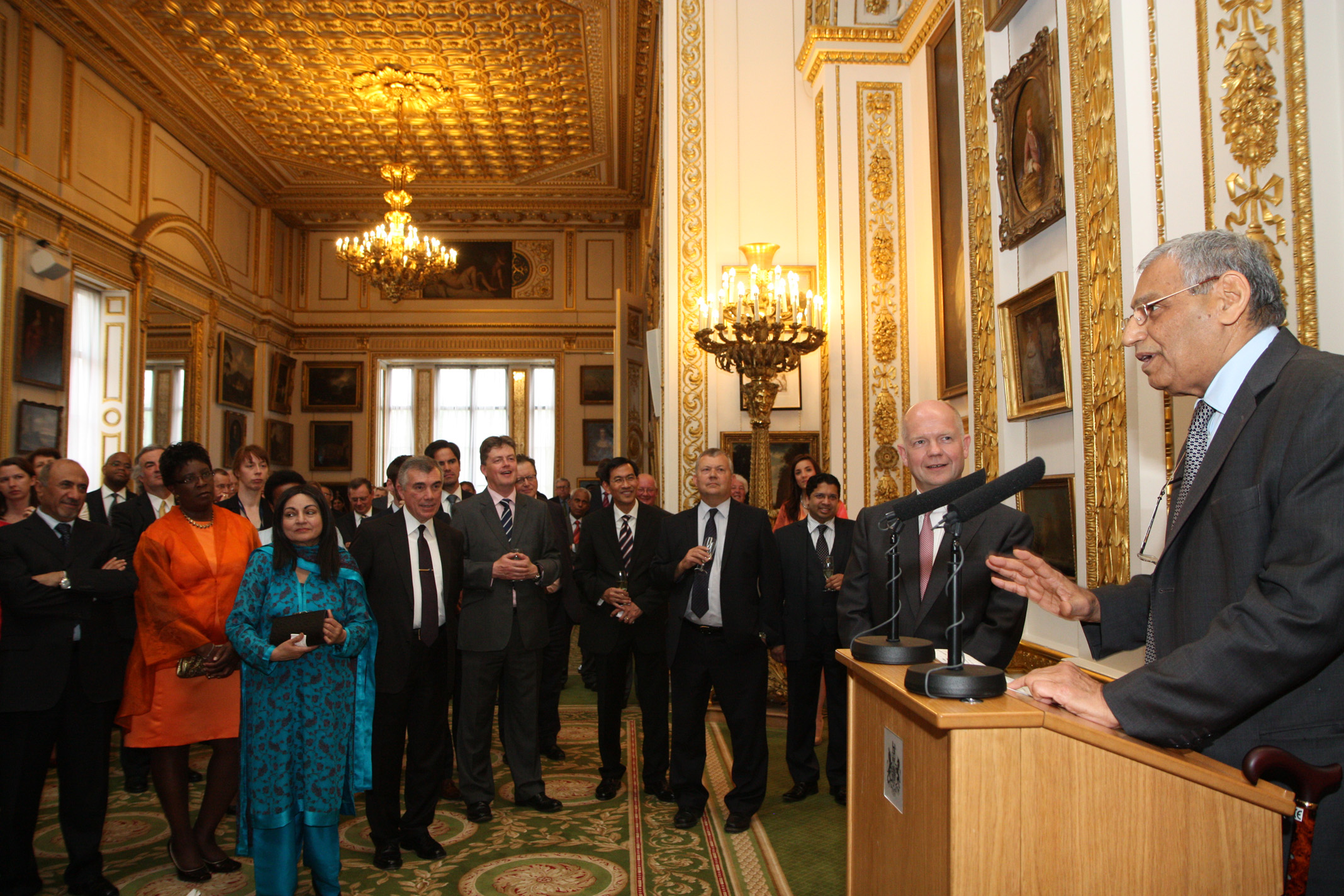
- Khaled Al-Duwaisan (right)

Ambassador of Kuwait to the United Kingdom
- In office 1993–2022

Personal details
- Born: 15 August 1947 (age 79)
- Citizenship: Kuwaiti
- Education: Cairo University BA; Kuwait University MBA
- Occupation: Diplomat

Khaled Abdulaziz Al-Duwaisan (born 15 August 1947) is a Kuwaiti diplomat. He was the ambassador to the United Kingdom from 1993 to 2022. He was Dean of the Diplomatic Corps in London.

== Biography ==
Al-Duwaisan received his BA degree from Cairo University and his MBA in diplomacy from Kuwait University.

Al-Duwaisan joined Kuwait's Foreign Ministry in 1970. Prior to his posting to London, he served as Kuwait's ambassador to the Netherlands and Romania before being posted to London in 1993.

In London, Al-Duwaisan is Dean of the Diplomatic Corps as the longest-serving ambassador to the United Kingdom.

== Honours and awards ==
In 1995, Queen Elizabeth II appointed Al-Duwaisan an Honorary Knight Grand Cross of the Royal Victorian Order (GCVO). In 2012, he received an Honorary DCL degree from the University of East Anglia.

In March 2015, he was awarded the Grassroot Diplomat Initiative Award under the Policy Driver category for his work on interfaith dialogue and counter-terrorism.

On 19 July 2022, upon relinquishing his appointment as Ambassador from the State of Kuwait to the Court of St James's and upon retiring as Dean of the Diplomatic Corps, Al-Duwaisan was awarded as Honorary Knight Commander of the Order of St Michael and St George (KCMG).

== Durham University ==
A doctoral fellowship named after Al-Duwaisan at Durham University's Ustinov College is awarded annually to postgraduate students focused on international and regional politics and security.
