= Adam Constable =

English High Court judge

The Honourable Mr Justice Constable
- Royal coat of arms of the United Kingdom

Justice of the High Court
- Incumbent
- Assumed office 13 March 2023

Personal details
- Education: Trinity School, Croydon; Balliol College, Oxford
- Known for: Technology and Construction Court

Adam Michael Constable is a judge of the High Court of England and Wales, assigned to the King's Bench Division. He sits in the Technology and Construction Court and is authorised for other King's Bench work including the Administrative Court.

== Early life and education ==
Constable was educated at Trinity School, Croydon, then read jurisprudence at Balliol College, Oxford, graduating in 1994 with a first.

== Career at the Bar ==
He was called to the Bar by Inner Temple in 1995, appointed a Recorder in 2009, and took silk in 2011. Before his appointment to the bench he practised in construction, engineering, energy, shipbuilding and professional negligence, and acted as an arbitrator.

== Judicial career ==
Constable was appointed a judge of the High Court on 13 March 2023 and assigned to the King's Bench Division. He sits in the Technology and Construction Court. His appointment was also reported by the Law Society Gazette.

The following notable cases have been reported in the legal press:

- In GS Woodland Court GP 1 Ltd v GSL Management Services Ltd the High Court criticised claimed Grade A hourly rates exceeding £1,000 and reduced the sums sought.
- In group litigation relating to diesel emissions, senior judges including Constable J sharply reduced what they described as “absurd” claimant budgets.
- He presided over claims in the Jaguar Land Rover group litigation, reported in the Law Society Gazette.

== Honours ==
Upon appointment he was styled The Honourable Mr Justice Constable.

== See also ==
- High Court of Justice
