= Roisin Quinn =

British electrical engineer

Roisin Quinn OBE FREng
- Education: University College Dublin
- Engineering career
- Discipline: Energy
- Employer(s): National Grid; RenewableUK

Roisin Quinn is a British engineer and energy industry executive, known for her significant contributions to electricity system management, energy security, and decarbonization efforts. She serves as a senior executive at National Grid.

== Education ==
Quinn received her first-class degree in Electrical Engineering from University College Dublin, She then joined the National Grid's graduate program in 2004.

== Career ==
After joining as a graduate in 2004, before getting promoted to the role of Head of National Control at the National Grid, where she led the control room responsible for maintaining Great Britain's electricity supply. In this role, Quinn oversaw a team of over 250 engineers and analysts.

Quinn's career has been marked by significant contributions to the energy sector. As Capacity Market Design Manager from 2012 to 2014, she worked with the government and Ofgem to design and implement Britain's first capacity market, a crucial mechanism for ensuring future electricity supply security. Her leadership was particularly evident during the COVID-19 pandemic, where she managed the initial response and developed new approaches for grid balancing amid unprecedented changes in electricity demand.

Outside of National Grid, Quinn serves as deputy chair of RenewableUK, contributing to the advancement of renewable energy across the UK. Her roles in the energy industry led to her being recognised as an Officer of the Order of the British Empire in 2022 and her election as a Fellow of the Royal Academy of Engineering in 2024.
