= Michael Green (judge) =

British judge (born 1964)

The Honourable Mr Justice Michael Green
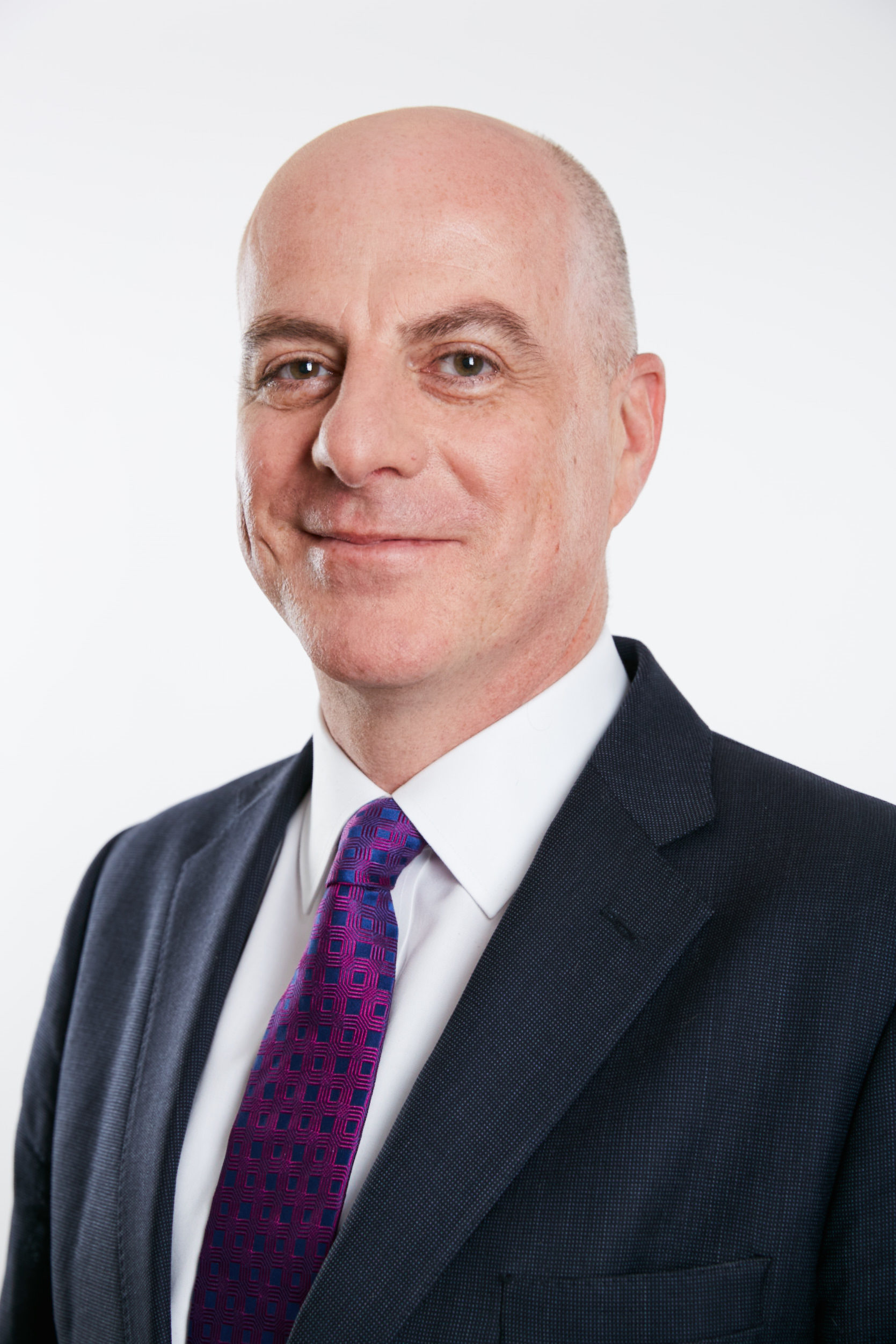
- Green in 2018

High Court Judge Chancery Division
- Incumbent
- Assumed office 02 November 2020
- Monarchs: Elizabeth II; Charles III

Personal details
- Born: 23 October 1964 (age 61) London, England
- Education: Jesus College, Cambridge

Sir Michael Anthony Green styled Mr Justice Michael Green (born 23 October 1964) is a British High Court judge.

== Personal life and education ==
Green was born in London, England and educated at University College School. He then attended Jesus College, Cambridge, where he graduated with a BA in law in 1986.

In 1991, he married Giselle Finlay and together they have a son and two daughters.

== Career ==
He was called to the bar at Lincoln's Inn in 1987 and practised commercial and company law from Fountain Court chambers. He took silk in 2009 and was appointed a deputy High Court judge in 2018. In 2019, he was a judge on the Commercial Court of the British Virgin Islands. In 2008, he was a member of the monitoring board at HM Prison Wormwood Scrubs.

On 2 November 2020, Green was appointed a judge of the High Court and assigned to the Chancery Division. He received the customary knighthood in the same year.

== Social Action ==
Following the full-scale invasion of Ukraine in February 2022, Michael Green registered as a host with the United Kingdom government's Homes for Ukraine visa sponsorship framework. Later that year, in July, he and his family welcomed two Ukrainian refugees (a Ukrainian lawyer and her nine-year-old daughter) to London. Providing the feeling of home at their private residence. Lady Green helped settle the daughter to a school, allowing the mother to focus on rebuilding her career.
