= Robert Miles (judge) =

British judge

The Right Honourable Lord Justice Miles
- Royal coat of arms of the United Kingdom

Lord Justice of Appeal
- Incumbent
- Assumed office 7 October 2025
- Monarch: Charles III

Justice of the High Court
- In office 2020–2025
- Monarchs: Elizabeth II; Charles III

Personal details
- Born: 29 November 1962 (age 63)

Sir Robert John Miles, styled The Rt Hon. Lord Justice Miles, is a British Lord Justice of Appeal.

== Personal life and education ==
Miles was born on the 29th of November 1962, later studying philosophy, politics and economics at Oxford University before obtaining a Diploma in Law at City University and returning to Oxford University to take the Bachelor of Civil Law.

== Career ==
Called to the Bar in 1987, Miles practised from Chambers at 4 Stone Buildings, in Lincoln's Inn, specialising in commercial and financial law and civil fraud, often with a foreign element. He was appointed as Queen's Counsel in 2002 and as a Deputy High Court Judge in 2006. From June 2012 he served as Attorney-General of the Duchy of Lancaster.

On 21 April 2020 he was appointed as a Justice of the High Court and on 16 March 2022 he received the customary knighthood. Miles has also co-edited Oxford University Press’s Annotated Companies Legislation.

On 7 October 2025, he was appointed Lord Justice of Appeal.
