= Rowena Collins Rice =

British judge (born 1960)

The Honourable Mrs Justice Collins Rice DBE, CB
- Royal coat of arms of the United Kingdom

High Court Judge King's Bench Division
- Incumbent
- Assumed office 1 October 2020
- Monarchs: Elizabeth II; Charles III

Personal details
- Born: Rowena Collins; 24 April 1960 (age 66) United Kingdom
- Education: Hertford College, Oxford

Dame Rowena Collins Rice, DBE, CB (née Collins; born 24 April 1960), the Honourable Mrs Justice Collins Rice, is a British High Court judge and former civil servant.

== Early life and education ==
Rowena Collins was born in Dundee, Scotland. She was educated at Westbourne School in Glasgow. She attended Hertford College, Oxford and graduated with a first-class BA in jurisprudence in 1981. Between 1981 and 1985, she taught at the University of Oxford.

== Career ==
In 1985, Rowena Collins joined the Civil Service; first in the Home Office from 1985 to 1991, then in the Treasury Solicitor's Department from 1992 to 1995. In 1995, she entered the Government Legal Service's trainee scheme and was admitted as a solicitor in that year.

=== Solicitor ===
She worked again in the Home Office from 1995 to 2003, the Department for Constitutional Affairs from 2003 to 2005. From 2005 until 2007, she was legal director in tax law at the HM Revenue and Customs. In 2007, she was appointed legal adviser to the Ministry of Justice, and was promoted to the Ministry's executive board as director general (democracy, constitution and law) and appointed chief legal officer.

In 2010, she was appointed director general for the constitution to the Deputy Prime Minister. She was secretary of the Leveson Inquiry from 2011 to 2012, was director-general at the Attorney General's Office from 2013 until 2020. In 2017, Collins Rice was appointed a deputy High Court judge.

=== High Court appointment ===
On 1 October 2020, Collins Rice was appointed a judge of the High Court, upon the retirement of Dame Anne Rafferty in the Court of Appeal, and she was assigned to the Queen's Bench Division. She received the customary DBE and was appointed a Commander of the Order of the Bath in 2020.

== Personal life ==
In 1986, Rowena Collins married Hugh Rice (later known as Hugh Collins Rice); the couple adopted double-barreled surnames. They have two sons.
