= Michael Fordham (judge) =

English judge (born 1964)

The Honourable Mr Justice Fordham
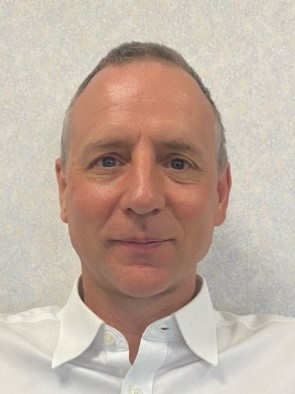
- Fordham in 2022

High Court Judge King's Bench Division
- Incumbent
- Assumed office 2020
- Monarchs: Elizabeth II; Charles III

Personal details
- Born: 21 December 1964 (age 61)
- Education: Hertford College, Oxford

Sir Michael John Fordham (born 21 December 1964), styled The Hon. Mr Justice Fordham, is a judge of the High Court of England and Wales assigned to the King's Bench Division. He was appointed as a Justice of the High Court on 13 January 2020.

== Education ==
Fordham was educated at Spalding Grammar School between 1976 and 1983. He went on to study law at Hertford College, Oxford having been awarded a place through the Tanner Scheme. After achieving a First class degree, he stayed on at Oxford until 1987 to undertake a Bachelor of Civil Law (BCL). In 1988 he obtained a Master of Laws (LLM) at the University of Virginia.

== Career ==
Fordham was called to the bar in 1990 by Gray's Inn, and by 2006 had been appointed a Queen's Counsel. Four years later he became a Civil Recorder, and in 2012, a Criminal Recorder. He was appointed Deputy Judge of the Upper Tribunal, sitting for six years until 2018. He was authorised under s9(1) to sit as a Deputy High Court Judge in 2013.

During his career as a barrister spanning 1990 to 2020, he specialised (inter alia) in public law, administrative law, immigration and asylum, health and human rights, arguing more than 50 cases in the House of Lords and the Supreme Court.

Fordham is a Bencher of Gray's Inn where he formerly served as Master of Students.

=== Cases argued ===
The following are among the cases argued by Fordham during his career as a barrister:

- R (Miller) v The Prime Minister and Cherry v Advocate General for Scotland
- Lauzika, R (On the Application of) v Secretary of State for the Home Department [2018] EWHC 1045 (Admin)
- Secretary of State for the Home Department v ZAT and Ors [2016] EWCA Civ 810
- Pinochet, In re [1999] UKHL 1; [2000] 1 AC 119; [1999] 1 All ER 577; [1999] 2 WLR 272
- Keyu & Others v Secretary of State for Foreign and Commonwealth Affairs & Anr [2014] EWCA Civ 312
- R (March) v Secretary of State for Health [2010] EWHC 765 (Admin)
- R v Parliamentary Commissioner for Standards, ex p Al-Fayed [1998]

== Author ==
As a legal practitioner specialising in judicial review, Fordham has authored seven editions of his Judicial Review Handbook. In the foreword to the 5th Edition, Lord Woolf paid tribute to the author, saying that the handbook was "an institution for those who practise public law".

== Bibliography ==
- Fordham, Michael (1994). Judicial Review Handbook (1st ed.). Wiley Chancery Law Pub. ISBN 9780471950288.
- Fordham, Michael (1997). Judicial Review Handbook (2nd ed.). Wiley Chancery Law Pub. ISBN 9780471970224.
- Fordham, Michael (2001). Judicial Review Handbook (3rd ed.). Hart Publishing Ltd. ISBN 9781841132389.
- Fordham, Michael (2004). Judicial Review Handbook (4th ed.). Hart Publishing Ltd. ISBN 9781841134390.
- Fordham, Michael (2008). Judicial Review Handbook (5th ed.). Hart Publishing Ltd. ISBN 9781841138244.
- Fordham, Michael (2012). Judicial Review Handbook (6th ed.). Hart Publishing Ltd. ISBN 9781849461597.
- Fordham, The Hon Sir Michael (2021). Judicial Review Handbook (7th ed.). Bloomsbury Academic. ISBN 9781509922833.
- Fordham, The Hon Sir Michael (2025). Judicial Review Handbook (8th ed.). Bloomsbury Publishing. ISBN 9781509994830.
