= Edwin Johnson (judge) =

British judge

The Honourable Mr Justice Edwin Johnson
- Royal coat of arms of the United Kingdom

Justice of the High Court
- Incumbent
- Assumed office 1 October 2021

Personal details
- Born: 11 April 1963 (age 63) Lincolnshire, England
- Education: Christ Church, Oxford

Sir Edwin Geoffrey Johnson (born 11 May 1963) is a British High Court judge.

== Personal life and education ==
Johnson was born in Lincolnshire, England and grew up in Surrey; he was educated at Lancing College. He then attended Christ Church, Oxford where he completed a BA in jurisprudence in 1986.

In 1991, he married Mary Thorne and together they have two sons and a daughter.

== Career ==
He was called to the bar at Lincoln's Inn in 1987 and practised real property and professional negligence from Maitland Chambers. He took silk in 2006 and was appointed a deputy High Court judge in 2017. He was an editor of Snell's Equity thirty-first edition in 2005. As a practitioner, he appeared before the House of Lords.

On 1 October 2021, Johnson was appointed a judge of the High Court and assigned to the Chancery Division. He received the customary knighthood in the same year. He was appointed President of the Upper Tribunal (Lands Chamber) on 1 August 2022.
