= Andrew Ritchie (judge) =

British High Court judge (born 1960)

The Honourable Mr Justice Ritchie
- Royal coat of arms of the United Kingdom

Justice of the High Court
- Incumbent
- Assumed office 1 October 2021

Personal details
- Born: 4 April 1960 (age 66) United Kingdom
- Education: Magdalene College, Cambridge

Sir Andrew George Ritchie (born 4 April 1960) is a British High Court judge.

== Early life and education ==
Ritchie grew up in Dulwich, London. He attended Magdalene College, Cambridge and graduated with a BA in law in 1981.

== Career ==
He was first admitted as a solicitor in 1984 and then was called to the bar at the Inner Temple in 1985, practising personal injury and clinical negligence from 9 Gough Chambers; he was head of chambers from 2012 to 2019.

He took silk in 2009. He was on the executive committee of the Association of Personal Injury Lawyers from 1996 to 1999 and chair of the Personal Injury Bar Association from 2014 to 2016. He served as the College Advocate for Magdalene College, Cambridge. As a practitioner, he appeared before both the Court of Appeal and the House of Lords. In addition to practice, he was general editor of Kemp & Kemp: Law Practice and Procedure from 2005 and he has served on the editorial board of Kemp & Kemp on Quantum since 2004 and continuing.

=== High Court appointment ===
On 1 October 2021, Ritchie was appointed a judge of the High Court and assigned to the Queen's Bench Division. He received the customary knighthood the following year.

== Personal life ==
In 1988, he married Victoria Wilberforce and they had a son and a daughter; they were divorced in 2009. In 2012, he married Charlotte Chaliha FRCOG and they have a daughter.
