= Joanna Smith (judge) =

British judge

The Honourable Mrs Justice Smith
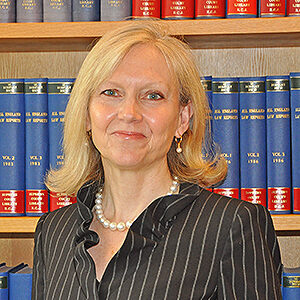
- Smith in 2022

Justice of the High Court
- Incumbent
- Assumed office 15 February 2021

Personal details
- Born: 27 April 1968 (age 58) London, England
- Education: Christ Church, Oxford

Dame Joanna Angela Smith, DBE (born 27 April 1968), styled Mrs Justice Smith, is a British High Court judge.

Smith was born in London, England in 1968 and educated at King's Ely. She attended Christ Church, Oxford, matriculating in 1986, and graduated with a first-class MA in jurisprudence.

She was called to the bar at Lincoln's Inn in 1990, practising commercial, professional negligence and construction law from Cornerstone Chambers and Wilberforce Chambers. Smith took silk in 2009 and was appointed a deputy High Court judge in 2017. As a practitioner, she appeared in the 2015 Cavendish Square Holding BV v Talal El Makdessi case before the Supreme Court of the United Kingdom. Prior to her full-time judicial appointment, she took appointments as an arbitrator.

On 15 February 2021, Smith was appointed a judge of the High Court and assigned to the Chancery Division. She received the customary damehood in 2020.

In 1994, she married Mark Vanhegan (a fellow KC) and together they have two daughters. Her brother, Simon Smith is a successful artist in Cornwall.

It was announced on 27 October 2026 that Smith has been appointed as Deputy President of the Business and Property Division of the High Court on an interim Basis, her appointment will commence on 1 November 2026.
