= Gerald Barling =

British judge

Sir Gerald Barling
- Royal coat of arms of the United Kingdom

Justice of the High Court
- In office 2007–2019

Personal details
- Born: 18 September 1949 (age 76)
- Education: New College, Oxford

Sir Gerald Edward Barling (born 18 September 1949), styled The Hon. Mr Justice Barling, is a retired judge of the High Court of England and Wales.

He was educated at St. Mary's College, Blackburn and New College, Oxford.

He was called to the bar at Middle Temple in 1972. He was a judge of the High Court of Justice (Chancery Division) from 2007, and retired with effect from 19 September 2019.
