= Naomi Ellenbogen =

British judge

The Honourable Mrs Justice Ellenbogen
- Royal coat of arms of the United Kingdom

High Court Judge King's Bench Division
- Incumbent
- Assumed office 2 November 2020
- Monarchs: Elizabeth II; Charles III

Personal details
- Born: 20 March 1970 (age 56) Liverpool, England
- Spouse: Martyn Barklem
- Education: New College, Oxford

Dame Naomi Lisa Ellenbogen DBE (born 20 March 1970) is a British High Court Judge.

== Early life and education ==
Ellenbogen was born in Liverpool, England and educated at King David High School, Liverpool. She graduated from New College, Oxford with a BA degree in Jurisprudence in 1991.

== Career ==
Ellenbogen joined Gray's Inn to train as a barrister and was called to the Bar from there in 1992. She practised in employment, commercial, and professional negligence law, from Littleton Chambers, following completion of her pupillage there in 1993. She took Silk in 2010 and was elected joint Head of Chambers from 2014 to 2018. Elected a Master of the Bench of Gray's Inn in 2014, she was appointed a Recorder in 2016 and a Deputy High Court Judge in 2017.

Ellenbogen was a member of the Bar Standards Board from 2015 to 2020, serving as its Vice-Chair from 2016 until her appointment to the Bench. She was General Editor of the fifth edition of Butterworths Employment Law: Practice, Procedure and Precedents, published in 2007. In 2019, she conducted an inquiry into bullying and harassment in the House of Lords and, amongst other findings, found that staff had been bullied and harassed by peers. In 2020, she led an inquiry into the governance of the Professional Footballers' Association.

=== Boris Johnson panel ===
In August 2018, Boris Johnson, who was then Foreign Secretary, made comments about Islamic full-face coverings, writing in a newspaper article that women wearing them looked like "letterboxes" and "bank robbers". This led to complaints against Johnson and an investigation to determine whether his remarks breached the Conservative Party code of conduct, and Ellenbogen was appointed to chair an independent panel to decide the matter. She found that Johnson's use of language could be considered provocative but was not contrary to the party rules, which did not "override an individual’s right to freedom of expression". Her decision letter said it would be "unwise to censor excessively the language of party representatives or the use of satire to emphasise a viewpoint, particularly a viewpoint that is not subject to criticism". Consequently, the complaint was not upheld.

=== High Court appointment ===
On 2 November 2020, Ellenbogen was appointed a judge of the High Court and assigned to the Queen's Bench Division. She received the customary Damehood in the same year. With effect from 1 January 2024, Ellenbogen was appointed a Presiding Judge of the Northern Circuit.

=== Other ===
In September 2024, Ellenbogen found that Faud Awale, a convicted double murderer who held a prison officer hostage while serving a life sentence, had his human rights breached under Article 8 of the European Convention - after he was isolated from other inmates.

=== Reprimand ===
In October 2026, Ellenbogen was officially reprimanded for "serious misconduct" by the Judicial Conduct Investigations Office, after failing to issue timely judgements in several cases, with one litigant still waiting for a judgement 15 months after Ellenbogen presided over her case.

== Personal life ==
In 2008, she married Martyn Barklem (a circuit judge), who has two sons by a previous marriage.
