= Robert Peel (judge) =

British judge

The Honourable Mr Justice Peel
- Royal coat of arms of the United Kingdom

High Court Judge Family Division
- Incumbent
- Assumed office 01 October 2020
- Monarchs: Elizabeth II; Charles III

Personal details
- Born: 29 January 1966 (age 60) Singapore
- Education: Brasenose College, Oxford

Sir Robert Roger Peel (born 29 January 1966) is a British High Court judge. He is National Lead Judge of the Financial Remedies Court, the court which deals with assets on divorce.

Peel was born in Singapore and spent a portion of his childhood in Africa, being educated at private schools in England. He studied at Brasenose College, Oxford where he completed a BA in modern languages, studying French and Spanish. He then completed a diploma in law at City University London.

He was called to the bar at the Middle Temple in 1990. He took silk in 2010, was appointed a recorder in 2011 and a deputy High Court judge in 2016.

On 1 October 2020, Peel was appointed a judge of the High Court, replacing Dame Judith Parker who retired, and he was assigned to the Family Division. He received the customary knighthood in the same year.

In 1993, he married Victoria Williams and together they have two sons and a daughter.
