= Nigel Poole =

British judge

The Honourable Mr Justice Poole
- Royal coat of arms of the United Kingdom

High Court Judge Family Division
- Incumbent
- Assumed office 01 October 2020
- Monarchs: Elizabeth II; Charles III

Personal details
- Born: 10 November 1965 (age 60) Shipley, England
- Education: The Queen's College, Oxford

Sir Nigel David Poole (born 10 November 1965) is a British High Court judge.

Poole was born in Shipley, England and educated at Bradford Grammar School. He attended The Queen's College, Oxford and completed a BA in philosophy, politics and economics in 1984. He then attended City University London where he completed a diploma in law and the Inns of Court School of Law where he completed his barrister vocational training.

He was called to the bar at the Middle Temple in 1989 and practised clinical negligence and personal injury. In 2004, he joined Kings Chambers in Manchester, where he was head of chambers from 2017 to 2020.

From 2012 to 2020, he was a chair of the Bar Tribunal and Adjudication Service, determining disciplinary issues for practising barristers. He was appointed a recorder in 2009, took silk in 2012. He was appointed a deputy High Court judge in 2017.

On 1 October 2020, Poole was appointed a judge of the High Court, replacing Sir Jonathan Baker who was promoted to the Court of Appeal, and he was assigned to the Family Division. He received the customary knighthood in 2022. Since 2021, he has been the Family Division liaison judge for the North Eastern Circuit.
