= Heather Williams (judge) =

British judge (born 1963)

The Honourable Mrs Justice Heather Williams DBE, KC
- Royal coat of arms of the United Kingdom

Justice of the High Court
- Incumbent
- Assumed office 1 October 2021
- Appointed by: Elizabeth II

Personal details
- Born: 1963 (age 62–63) Portsmouth, England
- Education: King's College London

Dame Heather Jane Williams, DBE, KC (born 1963), also known as The Honourable Mrs Justice Heather Williams DBE, is a British High Court judge.

== Biography ==
Williams was born in Portsmouth, England and attended King's College London, graduating with a first-class LLB degree in 1984.

She was called to the bar at Gray's Inn in 1985 and was in practice from 1987, specialising in civil liberties, judicial review and employment discrimination; she practised from and was deputy head of chambers of Doughty Street Chambers. She appeared before the inquests into the Hillsborough disaster and was successful in Miriam O'Reilly's age discrimination case against the BBC. Williams took silk in 2006, was a part-time judge for the Employment Tribunals from 2005 until 2018, and served as a recorder and a deputy High Court judge from 2018.

On 1 October 2021, Williams was appointed a judge of the High Court and assigned to the Queen's Bench Division. She received the customary damehood in the same year.

On 1 January 2023, she became President of the Upper Tribunal (Administrative Appeals Chamber)

In 1997, she married Trevor Bragg and together they have a son and a daughter.
