= Charles Erdman Petersdorff =

British judge and legal writer

Charles Erdman Petersdorff (4 November 1800 – 29 July 1886) was a British legal writer and judge.

== Biography ==
Petersdorff, third son of Christian F. Petersdorff, furrier, of 14 Gough Square, London, and of Ivy House, Tottenham, was born in London on 4 November 1800. He became a student of the Inner Temple on 24 September 1818, and was called to the bar on 25 January 1833. He was for some time one of the counsel to the admiralty, and by order of the lords of the admiralty he compiled a complete collection of the statutes relating to the navy, to shipping, ports, and harbours.

On 15 November 1847 he married Mary Anne, widow of James Mallock, of 78 Harley Street, London.

He was created a Serjeant-at-law on 14 June 1858, and nominated, on 1 January 1863, a judge of the county courts, circuit 57 (North Devonshire and Somerset), an appointment which he resigned in December 1885.

He was killed by accidentally falling into the area of his house, 23 Harley Street, London, on 29 July 1886.

== Works ==
- A General Index to the Precedents in Civil and Criminal Pleadings from the Earliest Period (1822)
- A Practical Treatise on the Law of Bail (1824)
- A Practical and Elementary Abridgment of Cases in the King's Bench, Common Pleas, Exchequer, and at Nisi Prius from the Restoration (1825–30, 15 vols)
- A Practical and Elementary Abridgment of the Common Law as altered and established by the Recent Statutes (1841–1844, 5 vols.; 2nd edit. 6 vols. 1861–4; with a Supplement, 1870; and a second edition of the Supplement, 1871)
- The Principles and Practice of the Law of Bankruptcy and Insolvency (1861; 2nd edit. 1862)
- ‘Law Students' and ‘Practitioners' Commonplace Book of Law and Equity. By a Barrister (1871)
- A Practical Compendium of the Law of Master and Servant, and especially of Employers and Workmen, under the Acts of 1875 (1876)
