= Barry Cotter (judge) =

British judge

The Honourable Mr Justice Cotter
- Royal coat of arms of the United Kingdom

Justice of the High Court
- Incumbent
- Assumed office 1 October 2021
- Monarch: Charles III

Personal details
- Born: 30 July 1963 (age 63) United Kingdom
- Education: University College London

Sir Barry Paul Cotter (born 30 July 1963) is a British High Court judge.

== Early life and education ==
Cotter grew up in St Helens, England and attended West Park High School there; he completed an LLB at University College London in 1984.

== Career ==
He was called to the bar at Lincoln's Inn in 1985 and practised personal injury, product liability law and medical negligence law.

He was appointed a recorder in 2002, took silk in 2006, and served as a recorder until 2010 when he was appointed a circuit judge and a deputy High Court judge. He served as the designated civil judge for Devon and Cornwall from 2010 to 2017, then for Avon, Somerset and Gloucester until 2021. He was senior circuit judge at Bristol's Civil and Family Law Centre from 2018 to 2021. Further, he was a visiting fellow at the University of Bristol from 2016 to 2020 and from 2021 to 2022 an adjunct professor at the City University of Hong Kong. From 2020, he has been Visitor of the University of Bath.

In addition to practice, he wrote Cotter: Defective and Unsafe Products: Law and Practice in 1996 and was general editor of Munkman on Employer's Liability in its 14th edition in 2006 and 15th edition in 2009.

=== High Court appointment ===
On 1 October 2021, he was appointed a judge of the High Court and assigned to the Queen's Bench Division. He received the customary knighthood in the same year. In 2025 he was appointed a Presiding Judge of the North Eastern Circuit.

== Personal life ==
In 1996, he married Catherine Maskell and together they have a son and two daughters.
