= Charles Bourne (judge) =

British judge (born 1964)

The Honourable Mr Justice Bourne
- Royal coat of arms of the United Kingdom

High Court Judge King's Bench Division
- Incumbent
- Assumed office 01 October 2020
- Monarch: Charles III

Personal details
- Born: 4 July 1964 (age 62) London, England
- Education: Trinity College, Cambridge

Sir Charles Gregory Bourne (born 4 July 1964) is a British High Court judge.

Bourne was born in London, England and educated at University College School in London. He studied English at Trinity College, Cambridge and graduated with a BA in 1986. He followed this up with a year of study at Université de Paris IV, graduating in 1987. He was a journalist following university, but changed to law and completed a diploma in law at the Polytechnic of Central London.

He was called to the bar at the Middle Temple in 1991, practising public and employment law; he practised from 11 King's Bench Walk from 2012 till 2020. He was appointed a recorder in 2009, took silk in 2014, and was appointed a deputy High Court judge in 2016. As a practitioner, he appeared before the Supreme Court of the United Kingdom, and appeared for the Government in the 2010 case HJ and HT v Home Secretary.

In 2018, he was instructed to investigate claims by a University College London academic which alleged administrators pushed ahead with a £1 billion expansion of the institution without adequately consulting the constituent academics. Bourne was appointed by then Master of the Rolls Sir Terence Etherton, who was ex officio visitor of the institution.

On 1 October 2020, Bourne was appointed a judge of the High Court, replacing Sir Peregrine Simon who retired from the Court of Appeal, and he was assigned to the Queen's Bench Division. He took the customary knighthood in the same year.

In 1995, he married Catherine Chadwick and together they have a son and a daughter.
