= Robin Knowles =

British judge

The Honourable Mr Justice Knowles
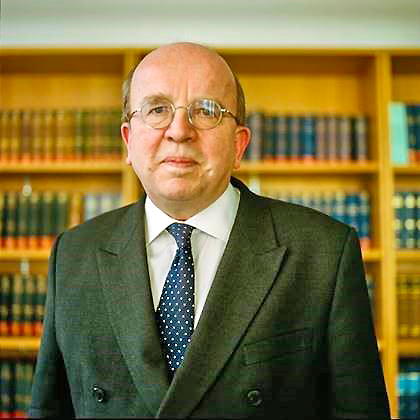
- Knowles in 2022

High Court Judge King's Bench Division
- Incumbent
- Assumed office 2014

Personal details
- Born: 7 April 1960 (age 66)
- Education: Trinity College, Cambridge

Sir Robin St John Knowles CBE (born 7 April 1960), styled The Hon. Mr Justice Knowles, is a judge of the High Court of England and Wales.

He was educated at Sir Roger Manwood's School and read law at Trinity College, Cambridge.

He was called to the Bar at Middle Temple in 1982 and he began practising in 1984. In 1999, he was appointed a QC. He was Chair of the Commercial Bar Association of England & Wales and of Advocate (the Bar Pro Bono Unit) and the National Pro Bono Centre.

In 1998, he was appointed an Assistant Recorder, followed by a Recorder in 2000, and Deputy High Court Judge in 2007. He has been a judge of the High Court of Justice (King's Bench Division) since 1 October 2014. He became a judge of the Commercial Court in 2015, and is a designated Judge of the Financial List.

Sir Robin was awarded the CBE in 2007 for services to pro bono legal services.

Knowles attracted media attention in July 2025 over his past decision to impose a superinjunction in the Afghan data leak affair. Knowles had said in his 2023 judgment that he had gone further than what the Ministry of Defence had requested: “Although it was proposed that the order (not the hearing) should be in public and published on the court website, I have decided it should be in private and not published on the website, at least at this stage.”
