= Thomas Leech =

British Judge

The Honourable Mr Justice Leech
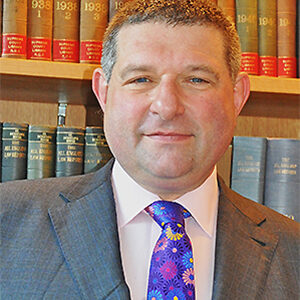

Justice of the High Court
- Incumbent
- Assumed office 1 November 2021

Personal details
- Born: 16 February 1964 (age 62) London
- Education: Oxford University

Sir Thomas Alexander Crispin Leech (born 16 February 1964), styled Mr Justice Leech, is a British High Court judge.

== Early life ==
Leech was born in London and brought up in Lancaster, Lancashire and, later, Kirkby Lonsdale, Cumbria; he attended Lancaster Royal Grammar School.

He went on to study Classics and Law at the University of Oxford, graduating in 1986. He continued his studies and later completed a post graduate degree, Bachelor of Civil Law.

His father was Geoffrey Neil Leech FBA (16 January 1936 – 19 August 2014), a specialist in English language and linguistics.

== Legal career ==
In 1988 Leech was called to the Bar by Middle Temple and joined Maitland Chambers.

Leech was appointed King's Counsel in 2010.

In 2014, Leech became a partner in the Advocacy Team at Herbert Smith Freehills.

Leech is one of the authors for a Law Textbook titled Flenley & Leech on Solicitors’ Negligence and a co-editor of Spencer Bower: Reliance-based estoppel.

He was appointed as a High Court judge on 1 November 2021 and assigned to the Chancery division by the Lord Chief Justice. He received his customary Knighthood in March 2022, at Windsor Castle.
