= Gwynneth Knowles =

British High Court Judge

The Honourable Mrs Justice Knowles
- Royal coat of arms of the United Kingdom

High Court Judge Family Division
- Incumbent
- Assumed office 2 October 2017
- Monarchs: Elizabeth II; Charles III

Personal details
- Born: 11 July 1962 (age 63) Oxford, England

Dame Gwynneth Frances Dietlinde Knowles DBE (born 11 July 1962), styled Mrs Justice Knowles is a British High Court judge of the Family Division.

Born in Oxford, Knowles attended Southill Sixth Form College. She was called to the bar in 1993 and was appointed King's Counsel in 2011. She previously worked for Atlantic Chambers in Liverpool.

She is fluent in German.

In 2007, she was appointed as a fee-paid Tribunal Judge for the First-tier Tribunal, Health, Education and Social Care Chamber.

In 2017, she was appointed as a High Court judge and assigned to the Family Division. She received the customary damehood from Elizabeth II in the same year.
