= Brick Court Chambers =

Barristers' chambers in London, England

Brick Court Chambers is a set of barristers' chambers in the Temple district of central London. It specialises in commercial, EU, competition and public law. It is considered by legal commentators to be one of the 'Magic Circle' of London's most prestigious commercial barristers' chambers. Brick Court Chambers was founded in 1921 by William Jowitt KC, who later became Lord Chancellor. It rose to prominence in the 1970s, with an increase in shipping and international trade litigation.

Jowitt remained in chambers until, in 1940, he became Solicitor-General in the wartime coalition government. After the war, he became Lord Chancellor in Clement Attlee's government. After Patrick Devlin was appointed to the High Court in 1948 and subsequently became a Law Lord, Colin Pearson KC and David Karmel KC were successively Heads of Chambers. Sam Cooke QC became Head of Chambers on Karmel's retirement. When Cooke went to the High Court in 1967, he was succeeded by Philip Owen QC, Leader of the Wales & Chester Circuit, who remained Head of Chambers for 23 years. In 1990, Owen retired and Christopher Clarke QC became Head of Chambers. Senior clerk Ronald Burley, who had been appointed senior clerk by Patrick Devlin in 1948, also retired in 1991. Christopher Clarke QC was succeeded as Head of Chambers by Jonathan Sumption QC and Jonathan Hirst QC in 2005. On Jonathan Sumption's appointment to the Supreme Court in 2012, Nicholas Green QC replaced him, and on his appointment to the High Court Bench in 2013, Helen Davies QC became joint Head of Chambers. Jonathan Hirst retired in 2016 and died in 2017. Mark Howard QC succeeded him.

Brick Court Chambers currently comprises 110 full-time members, 50 of whom are silks, including well-known silk Sir Sydney Kentridge QC (a former Acting Justice of the Constitutional Court of South Africa, who was awarded the Lifetime Contribution Award at the 2013 Halsbury Legal Awards). The current heads of chambers are Mark Howard QC and Helen Davies QC. The current senior clerks are Paul Dennison and Tony Burgess.

At the 2012 Lawyer Awards, 2015 Legal Week British Legal Awards and 2017 Chambers and Partners UK Bar Awards it was awarded "Chambers of the Year".

Notable members include Lord Sumption, Lord Alexander of Weedon, Lord Phillips of Worth Matravers, Sir Richard Aikens, Lord Lloyd-Jones, Sir Peregrine Simon, Sir Christopher Clarke, Lord Lyell of Markyate, Sir Paul Walker, Sir Andrew Popplewell, Lord Leggatt and Sir Gerald Barling.
