= 2019 Special Honours =

British government recognitions

As part of the British honours system, Special Honours are issued at the Monarch's pleasure at any given time. The Special Honours refer to the awards made within royal prerogative, operational honours and other honours awarded outside the New Year Honours and Birthday Honours.

== Hereditary Peerage ==
- His Royal Highness The Earl of Wessex, KG, GCVO, CD the additional title Earl of Forfar – 10 March 2019

== Life Peerage ==
=== Conservative Party ===
- Nicola Blackwood, to be Baroness Blackwood of North Oxford, of North Oxford in the County of Oxfordshire – 1 February 2019

== Lord Lieutenant ==
- Colonel Peter Thomas McCarthy – to be Lord-Lieutenant of Renfrewshire – 13 March 2019
- Professor Peter Vaughan, QPM CStJ – to be Lord-Lieutenant of Mid Glamorgan – 17 April 2019
- The Rt Hon. The Lady Dannatt, MBE – to be Lord-Lieutenant of the County of Norfolk – 28 May 2019
- Joanie Aileen Whiteford – to be Lord-Lieutenant of Ross and Cromarty – 29 May 2019
- David William McCorkell – to be Lord-Lieutenant of County Antrim – 24 June 2019
- James Dick, OBE – to be Lord-Lieutenant of the East Riding of Yorkshire – 25 June 2019
- Gordon Kenneth Stephen Leckie – to be Lord-Lieutenant of Perth and Kinross – 23 July 2019
- Patricia Ann Sawers – to be Lord-Lieutenant of Angus – 8 August 2019
- Christopher Andrew Crawford Simpson – to be Lord-Lieutenant of Banffshire – 9 August 2019

== Privy Counsellor ==
- Mark Drakeford, AM – 10 January 2019 (on appointment as First Minister of Wales)
- Elizabeth Saville Roberts, MP – 7 March 2019 (on appointment as the Westminster Group Leader for Plaid Cymru)
- The Hon. Sir Stephen Males, QC – 13 March 2019 (on appointment to the Court of Appeal)
- The Hon. Dame Vivien Rose, DBE, QC – 13 March 2019 (on appointment to the Court of Appeal)
- Rory Stewart, OBE, MP – 3 May 2019 (on appointment as Secretary of State for International Development)
- Dr. Andrew Murrison, MP – 22 May 2019 (on appointment as Minister of State for the Middle East & International Development)
- The Hon. Dame Ingrid Simler, DBE, QC – 10 July 2019 (on appointment to the Court of Appeal)
- Rishi Sunak, MP – 25 July 2019 (on appointment as Chief Secretary to the Treasury)
- Mark Spencer, MP – 25 July 2019 (on appointment as Chief Whip of the House of Commons)
- Kwasi Kwarteng, MP – 25 July 2019 (on appointment as Minister of State for Business and Energy)
- Joseph Johnson, MP – 25 July 2019 (on appointment as Minister of State at the Department of Business, Energy and Industrial Strategy & Minister of State for Universities)
- Oliver Dowden, CBE, MP – 25 July 2019 (on appointment as Minister for the Cabinet Office)
- Jake Berry, MP – 25 July 2019 (on appointment as Minister of State for the Northern Powerhouse)
- Alok Sharma, MP – 25 July 2019 (on appointment as Secretary of State for International Development)
- The Hon. Jacob Rees-Mogg, MP – 25 July 2019 (on appointment as Lord President of the Council & Leader of the House of Commons)
- Robert Jenrick, MP – 25 July 2019 (on appointment as Secretary of State for Housing, Communities and Local Government)
- Alister Jack, MP – 25 July 2019 (on appointment as Secretary of State for Scotland)
- Robert Buckland, QC, MP – 25 July 2019 (on appointment as Lord Chancellor & Secretary of State for Justice)
- The Rt Hon. The Lord Ashton of Hyde – 28 August 2019 (on appointment as Government Chief Whip in the House of Lords)
- James Cleverly, TD, VR, MP – 28 August 2019 (on appointment as Minister without Portfolio & Chairman of the Conservative Party)
- Chris Skidmore, MP – 13 September 2019
- Valerie Vaz, MP – 13 September 2019
- Alec Shelbrooke, MP – 13 September 2019
- Michael Ellis, QC, MP – 13 September 2019
- Conor Burns, MP – 18 September 2019
- Thérèse Coffey, MP – 8 October 2019
- Zac Goldsmith, MP – 8 October 2019
- The Hon. Sir Christopher John Butcher, QC – 8 October 2019
- Jesse Norman, MP – 6 November 2019
- Simon Hart, MP – 17 December 2019 (on appointment as Secretary of State for Wales)
- The Hon. Sir Richard Arnold, QC – 17 December 2019
- The Hon. Sir James Dingemans, QC – 17 December 2019
- The Hon. Sir Andrew Popplewell, QC – 17 December 2019

== Most Noble Order of the Garter ==
Order of the Garter ribbon

=== Knight Companion of the Order of the Garter (KG) ===
- The Most Hon. The Marquess of Salisbury, KCVO PC – 27 February 2019

=== Lady Companion of the Order of the Garter (LG) ===
- Dame Mary Peters, CH DBE – 27 February 2019

== Knight Bachelor ==
Knight's Bachelor ribbon

- Charles Blandford Farr, CMG OBE – 14 February 2019
- The Hon. Mr. Justice Christopher John Butcher, QC – 1 May 2019
- The Hon. Mr. Justice Timothy Miles Fancourt, QC – 1 May 2019
- The Hon. Mr. Justice Richard David Jacobs, QC – 1 May 2019
- The Hon. Mr. Justice Gerald Joseph McAlinden, QC – 1 May 2019
- The Hon. Mr. Justice Jonathan Mark Swift, QC – 1 May 2019
- The Hon. Mr. Justice Anthony James Zacaroli, QC – 1 May 2019
- The Hon. Mr. Justice Benjamin Clive Freedman, QC – 11 June 2019
- The Hon. Mr. Justice Ian William Huddleston, QC – 11 June 2019
- The Hon. Mr. Justice Edward Henry Murray, QC – 11 June 2019
- The Hon. Mr. Justice Edward Brian Pepperall, QC – 11 June 2019
- The Hon. Mr. Justice David Michael Waksman, QC – 11 June 2019
- The Hon. Chief Justice Brian Moree, QC – 24 June 2019
- The Hon. Mr Justice John Cavanagh, QC – 14 November 2019
- The Hon. Mr Justice Martin Daniel Chamberlain, QC – 14 November 2019
- The Hon. Mr Justice Martin Alexander Griffiths, QC – 14 November 2019
- The Hon. Mr Justice Jeremy Charles Johnson, QC – 14 November 2019
- The Hon. Mr Justice Pushpinder Singh Saini, QC – 14 November 2019
- The Hon. Mr Justice William Spencer Philip Trower, QC – 14 November 2019

== Most Distinguished Order of St Michael and St George ==
Order of St Michael and St George ribbon

=== Knight Grand Cross of the Order of St Michael and St George (GCMG) ===
- His Excellency The Most Hon. Cornelius Alvin Smith. On his appointment as Governor-General of the Bahamas. 9 August 2019
- His Excellency The Rt. Rev. David Vunagi. On his appointment as Governor-General of Solomon Islands. 9 August 2019

=== Knight Commander of the Order of St Michael and St George (KCMG) ===
Honorary

- Zeid Raad Al Hussein, Jordanian national – Former United Nations High Commissioner for Human Rights. For services to the promotion and protection of human rights.

=== Companion of the Order of St Michael and St George (CMG) ===
Honorary

- Ahmet Üzümcü, Turkish national – Former Director-General, Organisation for the Prohibition of Chemical Weapons. For services to international diplomacy and the rule of law – 20 May 2019
- Theodor Meron, American national – President, International Residual Mechanism for International Criminal Tribunals. For services to criminal justice and international humanitarian law.

== Royal Victorian Order ==
Royal Victorian Order ribbon

=== Knight / Dame Grand Cross of the Royal Victorian Order (GCVO) ===
- Her Royal Highness The Duchess of Cambridge – 29 April 2019
- The Rt Hon. Field Marshal The Lord Guthrie of Craigiebank, GCB LVO OBE DL – on relinquishing his appointment as Colonel of The Life Guards and Gold Stick in Waiting – 7 June 2019.
- The Rt Rev. & Rt Hon. The Lord Chartres, KCVO, ChStJ, PC – on relinquishing his appointment as Dean of Her Majesty’s Chapels Royal – 11 July 2019.

=== Knight Commander of the Royal Victorian Order (KCVO) ===
- The Very Rev. Professor Iain Richard Torrance, TD – on the relinquishment of his appointment as Dean of the Chapels Royal in Scotland and Dean of the Most Ancient and Most Noble Order of the Thistle – 2 July 2019
- The Very Rev. Dr John Robert Hall, FSA FRSA – on the relinquishment of his appointment as Dean of Westminster and Dean of the Most Honourable Order of the Bath – 30 October 2019
- Major General Benjamin John Bathurst, CBE – on relinquishment of the appointment of Major-General commanding the Household Division. – 7 November 2019

=== Commander of the Royal Victorian Order (CVO) ===
- Inderjit Kaur Jutlla, LVO – on her retirement as Assistant Treasurer to The Queen – 20 March 2019.
- Air Vice-Marshal Garry Tunnicliffe – on relinquishment of his appointment as Defence Services Secretary – 27 March 2019.
- Peter McEuan Ashby, LVO – on his relinquishment of his appointment as Captain, The Queen’s Helicopter Flight – 31 October 2019.

=== Lieutenant of the Royal Victorian Order (LVO) ===
- Paul Frank Cradock, MVO – on relinquishment of his appointment as Senior Horological Conservator, Royal Collection – 21 May 2019.
- Paul Hughes, MVO – on relinquishment of his role as Chief Clerk and Accountant to the Household of The Duke of Edinburgh – 19 August 2019.
- The Rev. Canon Professor Peter Galloway, OBE – on relinquishing his appointment as Chaplain of The Queen’s Chapel of the Savoy and Chaplain of the Royal Victorian Order – 27 November 2019.

=== Member of the Royal Victorian Order (MVO) ===
- Sister Dorothy Mawdsley – on relinquishment of her appointment as Practice Nurse and Manager, Buckingham Palace Surgery – 20 February 2019.
- Captain Kiran Pun, The Royal Gurkha Rifles – on relinquishment of his appointment as Queen’s Gurkha Orderly Officer – 16 July 2019.
- Captain Kamal Bahadur Khapung Limbu, The Queen's Gurkha Engineers – on relinquishment of his appointment as Queen’s Gurkha Orderly Officer – 16 July 2019.

== Most Excellent Order of the British Empire ==
Ribbon bar of the Order of the British Empire (Military)

Ribbon bar of the Order of the British Empire (Civil)

=== Knight / Dame Commander of the Order of the British Empire (KBE / DBE) ===
Civil

- The Hon. Mrs. Justice Sara Cockerill, QC – 1 May 2019
- The Hon. Mrs. Justice Johannah Cutts, QC – 1 May 2019
- The Hon. Mrs. Justice Christina Caroline Lambert, QC – 1 May 2019
- The Hon. Mrs. Justice Sarah Valerie Falk, QC – 11 June 2019
- The Hon. Mrs. Justice Judith Sarah Farbey, QC – 11 June 2019
- The Hon. Mrs. Justice Nathalie Maria Daniella Lieven, QC – 11 June 2019
- The Hon. Mrs. Justice Justine Thornton, QC – 11 June 2019
- Prof. Martin Hairer, KBE, FRS – 12 August 2019 – Honorary appointed on 20 December 2017
- Prof. Ralf Dieter Speth, KBE – 12 August 2019 – Honorary appointed on 15 March 2018
- The Hon. Mrs. Justice Frances Jean Judd, QC – 20 September 2019
- The Hon. Mrs Justice Alison Lee Caroline Foster, QC – 14 November 2019
- The Hon. Mrs Justice Karen Margaret Steyn, QC – 14 November 2019

Honorary

- Kazuo Inamori, Japanese national – Founder and Chairman Emeritus of Kyocera Corporation, Honorary Adviser of KDDI Corporation and of Japan Airlines, and Founder and President of Inamori Foundation – For services to UK commercial and academic interests.
- Francis Yeoh, Malaysian national – Managing Director of YTL Group of companies. For services to UK-Malaysian bilateral relations.
- Tumani Corrah, Gambian national – Director, Africa Research Excellence Fund, Medical Research Council Unit, The Gambia. For services to medical research in sub-Saharan Africa.

=== Commander of the Order of the British Empire (CBE) ===
Military division

- Brigadier Simon Lea Humphrey, OBE – 29 November 2019

Honorary

- Kathleen Kennedy, American national – Film Producer and President, Lucasfilm – For services to film production in the UK.
- Kristin Forbes, American national – Lately Member of the Monetary Policy Committee of the Bank of England. For services to the economy.

=== Officer of the Order of the British Empire (OBE) ===
Military division

- Acting Captain Donald James Mackinnon – 5 April 2019
- Lieutenant Colonel James Maccoll Christie, The Royal Regiment of Scotland. – 5 April 2019
- Wing Commander Matthew John Bressani – 5 April 2019
- Commander Michael Gerard Carter Quinn – 29 November 2019
- Colonel Giles Richard Harris, DSO MBE – 29 November 2019
- Wing Commander Matthew David Roberts, DFC – 29 November 2019

Honorary

- Dr. Owen Brennan, Irish national – Executive Chairman Devenish Nutrition Ltd, Belfast Northern Ireland – For services to the Northern Ireland agricultural-food industry.
- Paul Breyne, Belgian national – Belgian Government Commissioner General for First World War Centenary commemorations, former Governor of West Flanders and Mayor of Ypres – For services to the British commemorations of the First World War Centenary in Belgium.
- Professor John McMurray – Professor of Medical Cardiology, University of Glasgow – For services to cardiovascular research.
- Michael Joseph Morley – Grade 6, Manager, Office of the District Manager, Jobcentre Plus, North London. For services to vulnerable people in North London.
- Thomas Gerard Kelly – Irish national – Lately Chair, Welsh Government Information and Communications Technology Sector Panel. For services to the information and communications technology sector in Wales.
- Erik Jørgen Østergaard, Danish national – Non-Executive Officer and Chairman, Danish Transport and Logistics. For services to the UK shipping industry.
- Norbert Franz Erich Strohschen, German national – President of the British Chamber of Commerce in Germany. For services to UK-German economic relations.
- Emmanuel de Merode, Belgian national – Director of Virunga National Park, Democratic Republic of Congo. For services to wildlife conservation.
- Cristina Fuentes La Roche, Spanish national – International Director at the Hay Festival of Literature and Arts. For services to promoting British culture and values to the Spanish-speaking world.
- Avid Larizadeh Duggan, Iranian-French-American national – Former General Partner, GV (formerly Google Ventures). For services to the economy, business and education.
- Sally Mulready, Irish national – Director, The Irish Elderly Advice Network. For political service and service to the community.
- Professor Barry Edward Gerard O’Sullivan, Irish national – Head of Assessment Research, British Council. For services to the development of English language assessment.

=== Member of the Order of the British Empire (MBE) ===
Civil

- Petr Torak, MBE – 12 August 2019 – Honorary appointed on 17 January 2017
- Natascha Michele Biebow, MBE – 12 August 2019 – Honorary appointed on 25 September 2018

Military division

- Lance Corporal Lewis Staton, Corps of Royal Electrical and Mechanical Engineers – 5 April 2019
- Squadron Leader Benjamin David Durham – 5 April 2019
- Lieutenant Colonel James Edward Bates, The Rifles – 29 November 2019
- Flight Lieutenant Jonathan David Simcox – 29 November 2019

Honorary

- Gemma Mary Griffin – Vice President, HR and Crewing, DFDS – For services to employment and training in the shipping industry.
- Ursula Roosmaa – Country Director, British Council Estonia – For services to promoting British culture and the English language in Estonia.
- Ediba-Bakira Trbonja-Kapić – Executive Assistant to HM Ambassador, Bosnia and Herzegovina – For services to the British Embassy in Bosnia and Herzegovina.
- Raymond Christopher Donovan – Co-Founder, The Chris Donovan Trust. For services to restorative justice.
- Livia Firth – Founder and Creative Director, Eco-Age and Co-Founder of the Green Carpet Challenge. For services to sustainable fashion.
- Setsuo Kato – Freelance Photo-Journalist, UK. For services to UK-Japan relations through photo-journalism.
- Dr. Sabine Ann Maguire – Paediatric Consultant, Royal Gwent Hospital and Founder, Sparkle Children’s Charity. For services to health and wellbeing of children with disabilities in Wales.
- Dr. Elpis Makrygianni – Education Developer and Coordinator, University College London. For services to higher education.
- Fatou Baldeh – Charity Worker, Dignity Alert and Research Forum Ltd (DARF), Edinburgh Scotland. For services to women’s health and to Black Minority and Ethnic communities in Scotland.
- Gelilawit Damena Duressa – Vice Consul, Consular Section, British Embassy, Addis Ababa. For services to British nationals in Ethiopia.
- Yvette Aziz Keriakos – Vice Consul, British Embassy, Cairo, Egypt. For services to British nationals overseas.
- Arnaud Marie Jacques André Poidatz – Director Strategic Cooperation and Marketing, MBDA, France. For services to UK/France industrial co-operation.
- Yvette Aziz Keriakos – Vice Consul, British Embassy, Cairo, Egypt. For services to British nationals overseas.
- Khalid Jumah Khalaf Al Behadily – Local Technical Works Supervisor, British Embassy, Baghdad, Iraq. For services to maintaining the operability of the British Embassy in Baghdad.
- Nelly Arghyropoulou – Consular Officer, British Vice Consulate, Rhodes, Greece. For services to British nationals in Greece.
- Dr. Sebastião Do Espirito Santo Neto – Honorary Legal Adviser to the British Embassy, Brasilia, Brazil. For services to HMG and UK interests overseas.
- Moon-ik Kim – British Honorary Consul, Busan, Republic of Korea. For services to furthering British interests in Busan, South Korea.
- Christophe Pascal Stephan Onraet – Lately Military Commander of the Province of West Flanders, Bruges, Belgium. For services to British and Commonwealth military.
- Dr. Lutgarde Vandeput – Director, British Institute at Ankara, Turkey. For services to UK/Turkey cultural relations.
- John Oruntagirinere Wyse – Head of Freight Clearance and Logistics, British Deputy High Commission, Lagos, Nigeria. For services to the British Deputy High Commission, Lagos, Nigeria.

== British Empire Medal (BEM) ==
Ribbon bar of the British Empire Medal (Civil)

Honorary

- Wataru Kuwahara – Division Manager, Event Planning Division, Hankyu Hanshin Department Store Inc – For services to the promotion of UK exports to Japan and friendship between the two countries.
- Roland Quitevis – Ambassador’s Driver, British Embassy, Manila, Philippines – For services to UK/Philippines relations.
- Pierluigi Angelini – Volunteer. For services to the community in Dumfries.
- Marije Elisabeth Davidson – Equality and Diversity Adviser, York St John University. For services to education.
- Raquel Luisa de Noronha Braga Ferreira – Personal Assistant to the Consul General, British Consulate General, Rio de Janeiro, Brazil. For services to the UK and UK government interests in Brazil.
- Margaret Hilda Francey – Lately Diabetes Specialist Nurse, South Eastern Health and Social Care Trust. For services to people with Diabetes in Greater Lisburn, Northern Ireland.
- Brendan Anthony Gallagher – Chairman, Northern Line Children’s Fund. For services to young people.
- Catherine Hélène Hartley – President, Cancer Support France/Languedoc. For services to British nationals in France affected by cancer.
- Zabar Khan – Head Bearer, British High Commissioner’s Residence, Islamabad, Pakistan. For services to British interests in Pakistan.
- Eve Kugler – Holocaust Survivor. For services to Holocaust education.
- Henri Obstfeld – Holocaust Survivor. For services to Holocaust education.
- Kathleen Mary Regan – Volunteer. For services to the community in Ballymena, Northern Ireland.

== Queen's Police Medal (QPM) ==
Queen's Police Medal for Distinguished Service

- Christopher Paul Johnson – Assistant Chief Constable, West Midlands Police – 8 June 2019

== Distinguished Flying Cross (DFC) ==
Ribbon bar of the Distinguished Flying Cross

- Flight Lieutenant Alex Fraser Vaughan – 5 April 2019

== Air Force Cross (AFC) ==
Ribbon bar of the Air Force Cross

- Squadron Leader Lee Christian Brown-Ahern, Royal Air Force – 29 November 2019

== Queen's Gallantry Medal (QGM) ==
Ribbon bar of the Queen's Gallantry Medal

- Sergeant Stuart Michael Griffiths, Royal Tank Regiment – 5 April 2019
- Corporal Saimone Matasarasara Qasenivalu, Royal Tank Regiment – 5 April 2019
- Warrant Officer Class 2 James Alexander Slade, The Royal Logistics Corps – 5 April 2019
- James Spencer Kennedy Watson – for services to the Foreign and Commonwealth Office (MI6) – 10 September 2019 – to be dated 29 November 2006
- Andrew Foster – 23 September 2019 – posthumous
- Luke Ridley – 23 September 2019
- Leading Seaman David Michael Groves, Royal Navy – 29 November 2019

== Royal Victorian Medal (RVM) ==
Royal Victorian Medal ribbon

Silver

- Colin Adams – Warden, Windsor Castle
- Gary Nathan Hill – Tractor and Machinery Operator, Crown Estate, Windsor
- Lynn Jean Hall – Daily Cleaner, Windsor Castle

== Mentioned in Despatches ==
Palm of the Mentioned in Despatches

- Flight Lieutenant Jonathan Blakelock Meadows – 5 April 2019
- Squadron Leader Michael Jones, Royal Air Force – 29 November 2019
- Flight Lieutenant Laurence Swift, Royal Air Force – 29 November 2019

== Queen's Commendation for Bravery ==
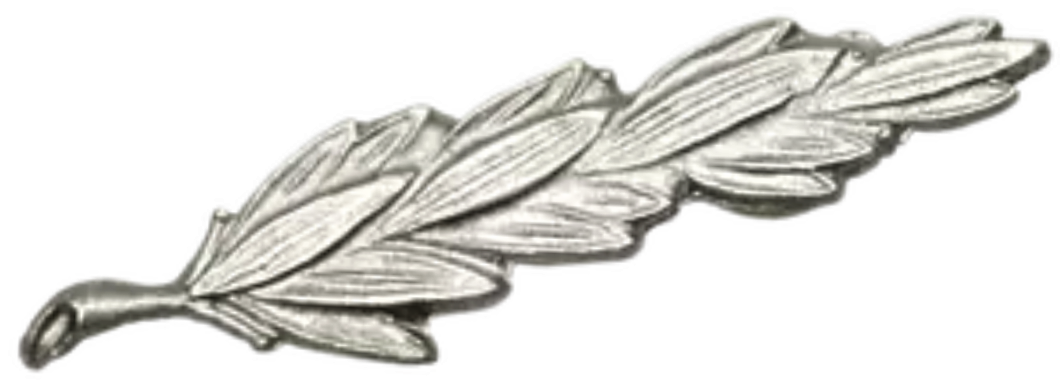
Queen's Commendation for Bravery

- Lieutenant Colonel Craig Palmer, Royal Regiment of Artillery – 5 April 2019
- Leanne Collopy – 23 September 2019 – posthumous
- Kieran Doble – 23 September 2019
- Matthew Daley, Nottinghamshire Police – 23 September 2019
- Jody Leonardi, Nottinghamshire Police – 23 September 2019
- Mark Fletcher, Lancashire Constabulary – 23 September 2019
- Able Seaman Alex Harvey, Royal Navy – 29 November 2019

== Queen's Commendation for Valuable Service ==
Palm of the Queen's Commendation for Valuable Service

- Commander Elaine Marie Boyd, Royal Navy – 5 April 2019
- Captain Frances Marie Byrne, Intelligence Corps – 5 April 2019
- Acting Lance Corporal Jacob Francis Campbell Fosher, Royal Army Medical Corps – 5 April 2019
- Lieutenant Colonel Robert Sholto James Hedderwick, The Royal Regiment of Scotland – 5 April 2019
- Lieutenant Colonel Samuel David Hughes, Corps of Royal Engineers – 5 April 2019
- Brigadier Mark Peter Kenyon, OBE – 5 April 2019
- Major Lucy Diana Kirkpatrick, MBE, Intelligence Corps – 5 April 2019
- Staff Sergeant Patrick Robert Jean Lia, Corps of Royal Engineers – 5 April 2019
- Lieutenant Colonel Owain David Luke, MBE, The Royal Welsh – 5 April 2019
- Colonel Richard Thomas Maundrell, MVO – 5 April 2019
- Acting Lieutenant Colonel Francis Simon Parke-Robinson, Intelligence Corps – 5 April 2019
- Acting Major Frazer Murray Stark, The Royal Regiment of Scotland – 5 April 2019
- Colonel Sion Duncan Walker – 5 April 2019
- Acting Air Commodore Roderick John Dennis, OBE – 5 April 2019
- Leading Medical Assistant Gemma Brown, Royal Navy – 29 November 2019
- Lieutenant Colonel Pier Lyndon Ashfield, DSO, Grenadier Guards – 29 November 2019
- Lieutenant Colonel Gordon Fletcher, Royal Logistics Corps – 29 November 2019
- Lieutenant Colonel Kevin John Forde, Royal Tank Regiment – 29 November 2019
- Captain Marcus James Gillan, Corps of Royal Engineers – 29 November 2019
- Major Andrew Scott Houston, Royal Regiment of Artillery – 29 November 2019
- Lieutenant Colonel Mark Stuart Jones, MBE, Corps of Royal Engineers – 29 November 2019
- Lance Corporal Claire Martin, Royal Army Medical Corps – 29 November 2019
- Lieutenant Colonel Philip Charles Moxey, MBE, Royal Anglian Regiment – 29 November 2019
- Captain Guy Keith Page, Adjutant General’s Corps – 29 November 2019
- Corporal Nabin Roka, Royal Gurkha Rifles – 29 November 2019
- Captain James Harold Thomas, Royal Corps of Signals – 29 November 2019
- Group Captain James Philip Brayshaw, Royal Air Force – 29 November 2019
- Group Captain Shaun Harris, CBE, Royal Air Force – 29 November 2019
- Wing Commander Howard Martin Parr, Royal Air Force – 29 November 2019
- Flight Lieutenant Oliver James Sargent, Royal Air Force – 29 November 2019

Civilian

- Dr. Gregory Benjamin Fremont-Barnes, Ministry Of Defence Civil Servant – 5 April 2019

== Order of St John ==
Order of St John ribbon

=== Knight of the Order of St John ===
- Roger William Jacob

=== Dame of the Order of St John ===
- Judith Kathleen Wright

=== Commander of the Order of St John ===
- Griselda Mary Clothier

=== Officer of the Order of St John ===
- Alan Codling
- Patricia Ann Griffin
- David John Hallett
- Colonel Christopher Young
- Alexander Auld McNe
- Nigel Lawrence Freeman

=== Member of the Order of St John ===
- Captain Catheryn Sarah Louise Adcock
- Ralph Maurice Ashwood
- Holly Jean Barfield
- Deborah-Ann Felicity Jane Cocks
- Alan Cooper
- George D’Arcy
- John Francis Fallon
- Karl Heydenrych
- Barrie John Hill
- Patricia Jenkins
- Mark Perryman
- David James Taylor
- Deborah West

== Foreign awards authorised by the Sovereign ==
=== Legion of Merit (United States) ===
Officer

- Brigadier Frazer Michael Lawrence, OBE – 5 April 2019
- Air Commodore Stephen Franklyn Lushington, CBE – 5 April 2019
- Air Commodore Harv Smyth, OBE, DFC – 5 April 2019

Legionnaire

- Colonel Denis James – 5 April 2019

=== Bronze Star (United States) ===
- Major Charles Duncan Thomas Brown, Corps of Royal Engineers – 5 April 2019
- Major Christopher David Ramsay Jodr, The Princess of Wales’s Royal Regiment – 5 April 2019
- Squadron Leader Kai MacNaughton – 5 April 2019
- Wing Commander Guy Matthew Wood – 5 April 2019

=== Meritorious Service Medal (NATO) ===
- Lieutenant Colonel Matthew John Birch, Royal Regiment of Artillery. – 5 April 2019
- Lieutenant Colonel Edward Jonathon Butterworth, Army Air Corps. – 5 April 2019
- Major Douglas Ian Davidson Watson, The Royal Regiment of Scotland. – 5 April 2019
- Warrant Officer Paul Thomas McKinnon – 5 April 2019
- Squadron Leader Avril Janet Porter – 5 April 2019
