= 2015 Special Honours =

British government recognitions

As part of the British honours system, the Special Honours are issued at the monarch's pleasure at any given time. The Special Honours confer the award of the Order of the Garter, Order of the Thistle, Order of Merit, Royal Victorian Order and the Order of St John. Life Peers are at times also awarded as special honours.

== Life Peer ==
=== Conservative Party ===
- Dr Rosalind Miriam Altmann, CBE to be Baroness Altmann, of Tottenham in the London Borough of Haringey – 19 May 2015
- Andrew James Dunlop to be Baron Dunlop, of Helensburgh in the County of Dunbarton – 26 May 2015
- The Rt Hon. Francis Anthony Aylmer Maude to be Baron Maude of Horsham, of Shipley in the County of West Sussex – 26 May 2015
- Dr Terence James "Jim" O'Neill to be Baron O'Neill of Gatley, of Gatley in the County of Greater Manchester – 28 May 2015
- James George Robert Bridges, MBE to be Baron Bridges of Headley, of Headley Heath in the County of Surrey – 28 May 2015
- The Hon. David Gifford Leathes Prior, to be Baron Prior of Brampton, of Swannington in the County of Norfolk – 29 May 2015
- Richard Sanderson Keen, QC to be Baron Keen of Elie, of Elie in the Fife – 8 June 2015

=== Crossbench ===
- Sir Robert Walter Kerslake to be Baron Kerslake, of Endcliffe in the City of Sheffield – 20 March 2015

== Victoria Cross (VC) ==
Ribbon bar of the Victoria Cross

- Lance Corporal Joshua Mark Leakey, the Parachute Regiment – 26 February 2015

== George Cross (GC) ==
Ribbon bar of the George Cross

- Colour Sergeant Kevin Howard Haberfield, Royal Marines – 31 July 2015

== Order of the Companions of Honour ==
Order of the Companions of Honour ribbon

=== Member of the Order of the Companions of Honour (CH) ===
Honorary

- Archbishop Emeritus Desmond Mpilo Tutu, for services to UK communities, international peace and reconciliation – 30 November 2015

== Privy Counsellor ==
- David Evennett MP
- Mark Field MP
- Baroness Garden of Frognal
- Sir Edward Garnier QC MP
- David Heath MP
- Charles Hendry MP
- Dr Julian Lewis MP
- Fiona Mactaggart MP
- Anne Milton MP
- Baroness Northover
- Keith Simpson MP

== Knight Bachelor ==
Knight's Bachelor ribbon

- The Rt Hon. Eric Pickles, MP – 14 August 2015
- The Hon. Mr Justice Henry James Carr – 10 November 2015
- The Hon. Mr Justice Adrian George Patrick Colton – 10 November 2015
- The Hon. Mr Justice Peter Donald Fraser – 10 November 2015
- The Hon. Mr Justice Andrew James Gilbart – 10 November 2015
- The Hon. Mr Justice David John Holgate – 10 November 2015
- The Hon. Mr Justice Timothy Julian Kerr – 10 November 2015
- The Hon. Mr Justice Alistair William Orchard MacDonald – 10 November 2015
- The Hon. Mr Justice Simon Derek Picken – 10 November 2015
- The Hon. Mr Justice Richard Andrew Snowden – 10 November 2015

== Most Honourable Order of the Bath ==
Ribbon bar of the Order of the Bath

=== Knight Grand Cross of the Order of the Bath (GCB) ===
Honorary

- Enrique Peña Nieto – President of the United States of Mexico – 3 March 2015
- Joachim Gauck – President of the Federal Republic of Germany – 25 June 2015

== Most Distinguished Order of St Michael and St George ==
Order of St Michael and St George ribbon

=== Knight Grand Cross of the Order of St Michael and St George (GCMG) ===
- His Excellency Samuel Weymouth Tapley Seaton, CVO, QC, JP – Governor-General of Saint Kitts and Nevis – 24 November 2015

=== Knight Commander of the Order of St Michael and St George (KCMG) ===
- His Honour Judge Howard Andrew Clive Morrison, CBE, QC – For services to international justice and the rule of law – 26 October 2015

Honorary

- José Antonio Meade Kubireña – Secretary of State for Foreign Affairs of Mexico – 3 March 2015
- Dr Joseph Muscat – Prime Minister of Malta – 26 November 2015
- Anders Fogh Rasmussen – 12th Secretary General of the North Atlantic Treaty Organisation – 30 November 2015

=== Companion of the Order of St Michael and St George (CMG) ===
Honorary

- Carlos Alberto De Icaza González – Undersecretary of State for Foreign Affairs of Mexico – 3 March 2015

== Royal Victorian Order ==
Royal Victorian Order ribbon

=== Knight Commander of the Royal Victorian Order (KCVO) ===
- His Royal Highness Prince Henry of Wales – 4 June 2015
- Sir Simon Gerard McDonald, KCMG – 30 June 2015

Honorary

- Diego Gómez Pickering – Ambassador of Mexico to the United Kingdom – 3 March 2015

=== Commander of the Royal Victorian Order (CVO) ===
- Rear Admiral Simon Paul Williams, RN – On relinquishment of the appointment of Defence Services Secretary. – 3 March 2015
- Nicholas Pickard – 30 June 2015
- Christopher Jon Martin, CB – Principal Private Secretary to the Prime Minister and Director-General of the Prime Minister’s Office. – 1 December 2015
- Robert Haydon Vernon Luke – 8 December 2015

=== Lieutenant of the Royal Victorian Order (LVO) ===
- William Brian Andrews, MVO, BEM – On retirement as Superintendent of the State Apartments, St. James’s Palace. – 24 March 2015
- Peter Ruskin – 30 June 2015
- Susan Jayne Elliott, MVO, MBE – 8 December 2015
- Jonathan Paul Knight – 8 December 2015

Honorary

- David Renato Najera Rivas – Deputy Head of Mission, Embassy of Mexico in the United Kingdom – 3 March 2015
- Aníbal Gómez Toledo – Consul of Mexico, Embassy of Mexico in the United Kingdom – 3 March 2015

=== Member of the Royal Victorian Order (MVO) ===
- William Smith, RVM – 30 June 2015
- Captain Lok Bahadur Gurung, The Queen’s Gurkha Signals – on relinquishment of his appointment as Queen’s Gurkha Orderly Officer – 4 June 2015
- Captain Prakash Gurung, The Royal Gurkha Rifles – on relinquishment of his appointment as Queen’s Gurkha Orderly Officer – 4 June 2015
- Andrew Hawkes, RVM – 28 July 2015
- Commander Andrew Canale, RN – On relinquishment of his appointment as Equerry to The Queen. – 1 September 2015
- Mark Flanagan – Keeper of the Gardens, Crown Estate, Windsor Great Park – 13 October 2015
- Peter Stephen Walter – On relinquishing the role of Finance and Project Co-ordinator, Master of the Household’s Department, Royal Household – 18 December 2015

Honorary

- Mónica Gabriela Valdez Murphree – Political Affairs Officer, Embassy of Mexico in the United Kingdom – 3 March 2015
- Susana Garduño Arana – Multilateral Affairs Officer, Embassy of Mexico in the United Kingdom – 3 March 2015

== Most Excellent Order of the British Empire ==
Ribbon bar of the Order of the British Empire (Military)

Ribbon bar of the Order of the British Empire (Civil)

=== Dame Commander of the Order of the British Empire (DBE) ===
- The Hon. Mrs Justice Philippa Jane Edwards Whipple – 10 November 2015

Honorary

- Ana Patricia Botín Sanz de Sautuola O'Shea — for services to the financial services sector
- Claudia Ruiz Massieu Salinas – Minister of Tourism of Mexico – 3 March 2015

=== Knight Commander of the Order of the British Empire (KBE) ===
Civil Division

Honorary

- Mark Getty – for services to arts and philanthropy
- Dr. Hermann Hauser, CBE, FRS – for services to engineering and industry
- Hiroaki Nakanishi – for services to UK/Japan business cooperation
- Martin Naughton, CBE – for services to the Northern Ireland economy, art and philanthropic causes
- Xavier Robert Rolet – for services to the financial services industry and young people
- Kevin Spacey, CBE – for services to theatre, arts education and international culture
- Dr. Ralf Dieter Speth – for services to the British automotive sector
- Luis Miguel Gerónimo Barbosa Huerta – President of the Directive Board of the Senate of Mexico – 3 March 2015
- Luis Videgaray Caso – Secretary of State for Finance and Public Credit of Mexico – 3 March 2015
- Pedro Joaquín Coldwell – Secretary of State for Energy of Mexico – 3 March 2015
- Ildefonso Guajardo Villarreal – Secretary of State for Economy of Mexico – 3 March 2015
- Emilio Chuayffet Chemor – Secretary of State for Public Education of Mexico – 3 March 2015
- Juan José Guerra Abud – Secretary of State for Environment and Natural Resources of Mexico – 3 March 2015
- Aurelio Nuño Mayer – Head of the Presidential Office of Mexico – 3 March 2015

Military Division

Honorary

- General Roberto Miranda Moreno – Presidential Chief of Staff of Mexico – 3 March 2015

=== Commander of the Order of the British Empire (CBE) ===
Military Division

- Brigadier Martin Patrick Mooew, late The Royal Logistic Corps
- Brigadier Paul Anthony Edward Nanson, MBE, late The Royal Regiment of Fusiliers
- Colonel David James Lord Swann, MBE, late The Queen’s Royal Hussars
- Colonel Gary Paul Wilkinson, OBE, late Royal Regiment of Artillery
- Brigadier James Medley Woodham, OBE, MC, late The Royal Anglian Regiment
- Brigadier Hugh Hollingworth Blackman, late The Royal Scots Dragoon Guards

Honorary

- Dr Paul Vincent Peter Beresford-Hill, MBE, For services to UK/US educational and cultural exchange
- Prof. Rivka Carmi, For services to UK/Israel scientific collaboration
- Mr Tae Young Chung, For services to enhancing the reputation of contemporary British art in Korea and investment in the UK
- James Julian Coleman, OBE
- Paul Joseph Drechsler, For services to the construction industry
- Karin Birgitta Forseke, For services to the financial services industry
- Mr David Carroll Grevemberg, For services to the Glasgow 2014 Commonwealth Games
- Syed Anwar Hasan, For services to the economy
- Prof. Nathu Ram Puri, DL, For services to business and to charity in the UK and abroad
- Professor Owen Patrick Smith, For services to child and adolescent cancer
- Eitan Wetheimer, For services to UK/Israel business cooperation
- David López Gutiérrez – Head of the Media and Communications Office of the Presidency of Mexico – 3 March 2015
- Enrique Cabrero Mendoza – Director of CONACYT– 3 March 2015
- Rafael Tovar y de Teresa – President of CONACULTA – 3 March 2015

=== Officer of the Order of the British Empire (OBE) ===
Civil Division

Honorary

- Kamal Abu Kalloub, For services to British nationals in Gaza
- Ms Angela Maria Brady, For services to architecture and education
- Mrs Diane Marguerite Briere de Isle Engelhardt, For voluntary and charitable services in Wales
- Etta Cohen, For services to women in business and entrepreneurship
- Dr Randy Lee Comfort. For services to children and families
- Professor Carlos Henrique de Brito Cruz, For services to scientific cooperation between the UK and Brazil
- Mr Patrice Philippe de Martin DE Vivies, For services to Franco-British trade and investment and the energy industry
- Kamal Gherbawi, For services to British interests in Gaza
- Sung-Joo Kim, For services to UK/South Korea business relations and British social causes
- Dr Marion Lyons, For services to public health in Wales
- Mr Denis Mulcahy, For services to peace building and youth development in Northern Ireland
- Joseph Gerard Mulligan, For services to first aid and community resilience
- James Martin O’Callaghan, For services to the construction industry
- Dr Frederik Dag Arfst Paulsen, For services to philanthropy, education, the environment, scientific and historical research and to young people
- Thomas Evert Petri, For services to UK/USA Parliamentary/Congress relations
- Prof. Agostino Pierro, For services to medicine and charity
- Dr Ursula Elisabeth Steingenberger-McEwen, For services to science
- Dr Isolde Louise Victory, For services to Parliament
- Ruby C Wax, For services to mental health
- Professor Winston Wen-young Wong, For services to education and research in the UK and to UK/Taiwan education relations
- Professor Ulrike Andrea Hildegard Zeshan, For services to higher education and the international deaf community
- Jorge Corona Méndez – Assistant Secretary to the President of Mexico – 3 March 2015
- Francisco Guzmán Ortiz – Chief of Staff to the President of Mexico – 3 March 2015
- Juan Manuel Valle Pereña – General Director AMEXICID – 3 March 2015
- Miguel Malvafón Andrade – Director General for Protocol – 3 March 2015
- Alejandro Negrín Muñoz – Director General for Europe – 3 March 2015

Military Division

- Acting Colonel Jaimie Fraser Roylance, Royal Marines
- Lieutenant Colonel Andrew Derek Griffiths Adjutant General’s Corps (Staff and Personnel Support Branch)
- Major Neil Alexander Kelly, The Mercian Regiment
- Lieutenant Colonel David Brian Kenny, The Royal Irish Regiment
- Lieutenant Colonel Richard Oliver Slack, MBE, 9th/12th Royal Lancers
- Wing Commander James Peter Penelhum, Royal Air Force
- Commander Daniel Clarke, Royal Navy
- Commander Michael Daren Smith, Royal Navy
- Captain Michael Keith Utley, Royal Navy
- Lieutenant Colonel Benedict Peter Norman Ramsay, MBE, Welsh Guards
- Lieutenant Colonel Graeme Crichton Wearmouth, The Royal Regiment of Scotland

Honorary

- General Gumaro Cabrera Osornio – Deputy Head of Logistics of the Presidential Guard of Mexico – 3 March 2015
- General Enrique García Jaramillo – Coordinator of Sports Promotion of the Presidential Guard of Mexico – 3 March 2015

=== Member of the Order of the British Empire (MBE) ===
Military Division

- Major Thomas Armstrong Scott Ryall, Royal Marines
- Staff Sergeant Lee Edwin Allen, Intelligence Corps
- Corporal Adam Ronald Peter Butler, Corps of Royal Engineers
- Captain Edward Philip Challis, The Royal Regiment of Scotland
- Major Duane Joseph Fletcher, Queen Alexandra’s Royal Army Nursing Corps
- Captain Duncan Mark Knox, The Parachute Regiment
- Captain Declan John Lynn, Adjutant General’s Corps (Educational and Training Services Branch)
- Major Jeremy Dawson Walters, Royal Regiment of Artillery
- Flight Lieutenant Emma Dutton, Royal Air Force
- Warrant Officer Class 1 Samuel George Doak, Royal Marines
- Lieutenant Wendy Frame, Royal Navy
- Commander Philip John Hally, Royal Navy
- Lieutenant Commander Steven Nicholas Wall, Royal Navy
- Captain Mark Edward Acklam, The Royal Corps of Signals
- Acting Lieutenant Colonel Jeremy Charles William Mawdsley, Royal Regiment of Artillery
- Acting Lieutenant Colonel Michael Richard Nigel Syewart, Irish Guards
- Squadron Leader Calvin George Bailey, Royal Air Force

Honorary

- Dr Mohammed Ahmed Abdul Razzaq Alahmed, For services to the British community in Qatar
- Brother Seon Jae An, For services to the Royal Asiatic Society and to furthering the study of English Literature in Korea
- Maria Victoria Buenaventura
- Mary Theresa Ceesay
- Patrick Dominick Cregg
- Mrs Charlotte Phyllis Anne Joelle Marie Cunningham, For services to children and young people
- Sister Rita Dawson, DL
- Gabriele Elisabeth Franklin
- Mrs Mandy Maureen Goddard, For services to children and families
- Ms Nazli Hamitoglu, For services to Consular support to victims of rape and sexual assault in Turkey
- Aaron Matthew Holtz, For services to the promotion of British values at the United Nations
- Ms Ayan Mahamoud Mahamed, For services to promoting friendship and cultural understanding between the UK and Somali region
- Miss Isabel Munoz, For services to disabled people and disabled access
- Agustin Navarrp Alvado, For services to the British community in Benidorm
- Ming Gek Ng (Mindy Tay), For services to British commercial interests in Singapore
- Agamemnon Otero, For services to the community energy sector
- Mrs Graciela Pena Perez, For services to British visitors to Cancun and the Riviera Maya, Mexico
- Clarinda Justina Salandy, For services to carnival design
- Joanna Hannah Basilio Teh, For services to British nationals in the Philippines during Typhoon Haiyan
- Petr Torak, For services to the Roma community in Peterborough
- Suha Zeidan, For services to British nationals in the Occupied Palestinian Territories
- Julio César Guerrero Martin – Private Secretary for the Secretary of State for Foreign Affairs of Mexico – 3 March 2015
- Héctor Agustín Ortega Nieto – Chief of Staff to the Undersecretary for Foreign Affairs of Mexico – 3 March 2015

== British Empire Medal (BEM) ==
Ribbon bar of the British Empire Medal (Civil)

- Colin Taylor, For services to the Homeless Community – 13 March 2015

Honorary

- Zergaw Asfera Andarge, For services to the British Embassy, Khartoum
- Drew Henry Avery
- Mrs Mary Margaret Daly, For services to the Butterfly Appeal Campaign for Multiple Sclerosis Therapy and to the community in Ashford, Kent
- Olga Clara Denyer
- Mary-Rose Egan
- Major (Retired) Yambahadur Gurung
- Abdullah Kuce, For services to the security of the British Consulate-General, Istanbul
- Frederick Alphonsus McDwyer
- Anne Eileen MC Mahon
- Mr Bernard Désiré Ernest Potaux, For services to UK/French relations and remembrance
- Woon Young Song
- Isabel Maria Lopes Spencer
- Hisako Zafar – for services to Business and to the Asian community.

== Companion of the Distinguished Service Order (DSO) ==
Ribbon bar of the Distinguished Service Order

- Lieutenant Colonel James Rowland Martin, MC, The Princess of Wales’s Royal Regiment
- Major Thomas Robson McDermott, The Royal Tank Regiment
- Lieutenant Colonel James Christopher Roddis, MBE, The Royal Regiment of Scotland

== Military Cross (MC) ==
Ribbon bar of the Military Cross

- Staff Sergeant Paul Jonathon Billingham, Royal Marines
- Captain William Andrew Hall, Royal Regiment of Artillery
- Major Angus Myles Arthur Tilney, The King’s Royal Hussars

== Distinguished Flying Cross (DFC) ==
Ribbon bar of the Distinguished Flying Cross

- Flight Lieutenant Laura Alice Hilary Nicholson, Royal Air Force

== Air Force Cross (AFC) ==
Ribbon bar of the Air Force Cross

- Flight Lieutenant Edward Thomas Berwick, Royal Air Force
- Flight Lieutenant Timothy Neil Eeddy, Royal Air Force
- Lieutenant Commander Christopher Torben Gotke, Royal Navy
- Flight Lieutenant Ian McIver Campbell, Royal Air Force

== Queen's Fire Service Medal (QFSM) ==
Ribbon bar of the Queen's Fire Service Medal for Distinguished Service

- Dale Anthony Ashford, Assistant Chief Fire Officer, Northern Ireland Fire and Rescue Service. – 6 February 2015

== Queen's Gallantry Medal (QGM) ==
Ribbon bar of the Queen's Gallantry Medal

- Paul Lye – 6 February 2015
- Corporal Jonathan Mckeag, Royal Marines
- Petty Officer Aircrewman Russell James Adams, Royal Navy
- Sergeant Daniel Martin Allanson, Royal Air Force

== Royal Red Cross ==
Ribbon bar of the Royal Red Cross

Associate Royal Red Cross (ARRC)

- Leading Naval Nurse Laura Jane Fallon, Queen Alexandra’s Royal Naval Nursing Staff
- Squadron Leader Charlotte Joanne Thompson-Edgar, Princess Mary’s Royal Air Force Nursing Service

== Mentioned in Despatches ==
Palm of the Mentioned in Despatches

- Colour Sergeant Ruairi Dwyer, MBE, Royal Marines
- Sergeant Christopher Stephen Browne, 9th/12th Royal Lancers
- Lance Corporal James Lee Brynin, Intelligence Corps (killed in action)
- Lance Sergeant Glenn Clarke, Coldstream Guards
- Lance Corporal Luke Oliver Pratley Forshaw, Coldstream Guards
- Captain William Alan Fry, 9th/12th Royal Lancers
- Captain Alasdair John Grant, 9th/12th Royal Lancers
- Staff Sergeant Stuart Hollis, 9th/12th Royal Lancers
- Captain James Richard Howlin, Coldstream Guards
- Lance Corporal Jamie Mccappin, Royal Regiment of Artillery
- Captain Edward Gervase Colyer Monckton, 9th/12th Royal Lancers
- Corporal Jonathan William Oliver, 9th/12th Royal Lancers
- Lieutenant (now Captain) Luke Joshua Wadman, Royal Regiment of Artillery
- Lance Corporal Lewis Stevenson, Royal Air Force

== Queen's Commendation for Bravery ==
- Warrant Officer Class 1 Simon James William Hsll, MBE, The Royal Logistic Corps
- Private John Steven Pyatt-Payne, The Mercian Regiment
- Petty Officer (Diver) Richard Anthony Brown, Royal Navy
- Lieutenant Commander Robin Leslie Suckling, Royal Navy
- Corporal Alexander Harries, Adjutant General’s Corps (Royal Military Police)
- Officer Cadet Frances Margaret Emma Townend, University Officer Training Corps Army Reserve

== Queen's Commendation for Valuable Service ==
Palm of the Queen's Commendation for Valuable Service

- Major Bruce William Drysdale Anderson, Royal Marines
- Lieutenant Commander Bradley Lawrence Watson, Royal Navy
- Lieutenant Paul Donald White, Royal Navy
- Staff Sergeant James Batten, Intelligence Corps
- Colonel Barry William Bennett, OBE, late Royal Regiment of Artillery
- Major Samuel George Cooke, The Royal Logistic Corps
- Lieutenant Colonel Stephen Weatherley Davies, Corps of Royal Engineers
- Acting Major Darren Paul Elsey, The Princess of Wales’s Royal Regiment
- Corporal Ricky Vincent Fleet, Corps of Royal Electrical and Mechanical Engineers Army Reserve
- Major Jeremy Francis Giles, The Royal Regiment of Scotland
- Major Gordon Grieve, Royal Regiment of Artillery
- Staff Sergeant Robert Charles Horton, The Parachute Regiment
- Lieutenant Colonel Alexander Graham Johnson, Royal Army Medical Corps
- Lance Corporal Benjamin Johnson, Intelligence Corps
- Lieutenant Colonel Nigel Alan Johnson, The Royal Anglian Regiment
- Major Mark Stuart Jones, Corps of Royal Engineers
- Private Carl David Lester, The Royal Logistic Corps
- Colonel Nicholas John Lock, OBE, late The Royal Welsh
- Staff Sergeant Kate Elizabeth Lord, Royal Army Physical Training Corps
- Brigadier Neil Marshall, OBE, late Royal Regiment of Artillery
- Warrant Officer Class 2 Mark Mcdougall, MC, Corps of Royal Engineers
- Corporal Stuart Johnathan Mcintosh-Mckeown, Royal Army Medical Corps
- Major Alexander Robert Mckay, MBE, The Mercian Regiment
- Major James Fraser Stuart Mcleman, The Royal Scots Dragoon Guards
- Acting Colonel John Robert Mead, OBE, Royal Regiment of Artillery
- Major Adam Svend Morris, Royal Army Medical Corps
- Sergeant Steven David Nixon, The Parachute Regiment
- Acting Captain Marcus Ian Pemberton, The Royal Regiment of Scotland
- Acting Lieutenant Colonel Andrew Robert Redding, MBE, The Parachute Regiment
- Lance Corporal Scott Robertson, The Royal Corps of Signals
- Warrant Officer Class 1 Nigel James Rogan, The Royal Corps of Signals
- Corporal Aaron Neil Ruffell, Intelligence Corps
- Lieutenant Colonel Bilal Muhammad Siddique, Adjutant General’s Corps (Army Legal Services Branch)
- Private Benjamin Charles Spittle, Royal Army Medical Corps Army Reserve
- Lieutenant Colonel Andrew Terence Stewart, The Royal Scots Dragoon Guards
- Major Gary Tait, MBE, The Royal Regiment of Scotland
- Lieutenant Hayden John Geoffrey Taylor, Intelligence Corps
- Acting Major Derek Francis William Tickner, Royal Regiment of Artillery
- Colonel Thomas George Vallings, late The Yorkshire Regiment
- Captain Richard Simon Wood, The Parachute Regiment
- Corporal Michael Terence Wright, Intelligence Corps
- Air Commodore John Charles Besell, Royal Air Force
- Acting Flight Lieutenant Stephen Derek Burr, Royal Air Force
- Wing Commander Piers Timothy Westcott Holland, MBE, Royal Air Force
- Flight Sergeant Richard Webster Selina, Royal Air Force
- C2 Jamie Darling, Contractor
- Major Paul James Stewart, Army Air Corps
- Captain Robert James Astley Bellfield, Royal Navy
- Warrant Officer 2 Engineering Technician (Marine Engineering) Kris Leslie Chard, Royal Navy
- Lieutenant Commander Edwin Sigurd Cooper, Royal Navy
- Able Seaman (Communications SM) 1 Matthew William Harriss, Royal Navy
- Sergeant Dean Jones, Royal Marines
- Chief Petty Officer Logistics (Supply Chain) Kenneth Murray Kennedy, Royal Navy
- Lieutenant Commander Matthew John Kent, Royal Navy
- Chief Petty Officer Warfare Specialist (Abovewater Warfare Tactical) Darren Lennon, Royal Navy
- Lieutenant Commander Charles Ian Maynard, Royal Navy
- Lieutenant Aleesha Wendy Mitchell, Royal Navy
- Lieutenant David Samuel Starkey, Royal Navy
- Lieutenant Graeme Hamish Walker, Royal Navy
- Major Kevin Finlay Walls, Royal Marines
- Lieutenant Colonel Benedict Holland Goddard Campbell-Colquhoun, Corps of Royal Engineers
- Corporal Lisa Michelle Dawson, The Royal Corps of Signals
- Major Jonathan Lee Gilbody, The Duke of Lancaster’s Regiment
- Corporal Karl Dominic Page, The Royal Corps of Signals Army Reserve
- Colonel Stuart Rokeby Roberts, Late The Royal Logistic Corps
- Sergeant Kevin Carver, Royal Air Force
- Warrant Officer Mark Evans, Royal Air Force
- Flight Sergeant Samantha Jane Green, Royal Air Force
- Squadron Leader Paul Thomas Hamilton, MBE, Royal Air Force

== Order of St John ==
Order of St John ribbon

=== Knight of the Order of St John ===
- Professor Roger Julian Berry, RD – 16 February 2015
- The Right Honourable The Lord Aberdare, DL – 16 March 2015
- William Sands Sommerville – 16 March 2015
- Sir Paul Michael Williams, OBE, DL – 16 March 2015
- His Excellency General The Honourable David Hurley, AC, DSC – 17 March 2015
- The Reverend John James Davis, MBE – 26 March 2015
- Michael Messinger, LVO, QPM – 26 March 2015
- Major General Mark Strudwick, CBE – 21 May 2015
- Stephen John Sieling – 21 May 2015
- Jack Martin Enoch Jr – 24 July 2015
- Doctor James Parker McCulley – 21 May 2015
- Paul White McKee – 21 May 2015
- The Reverend Andrew Craig Mead, OBE – 21 May 2015
- Ivan Sergeivitch Poutiatine – 21 May 2015
- John Demarest Van Wagoner – 21 May 2015
- James McIlhenny Wintersteen – 21 May 2015
- Nigel John Bewley Atkison – 2 December 2015
- The Right Honourable The Lord Mountevans, JP – 2 December 2015
- Craig Leslie Hartley – 2 December 2015
- Ricardo Kleinhans – 2 December 2015
- Joseph John Morrow, QC, DL – 2 December 2015
- David Watson – 2 December 2015

=== Dame of the Order of St John ===
- Fiona Mary Wilson Crighton – 16 March 2015
- The Honourable Virginia Lovell, JP, DL – 26 March 2015
- Elizabeth Ann Peterson Prien – 21 May 2015
- Jeanette Gesina Johanna Faurie – 2 December 2015
- Katharine Margaret Ella Liston – 2 December 2015

=== Commander of the Order of St John ===
- Brigadier David Ainsworth Harrison, JP, DL – 16 February 2015
- Terence Edward Walton, BEM – 16 February 2015
- Kim Lorraine Yeats – 16 February 2015
- Edmund Seymour Bailey – 16 March 2015
- John Connelly Dewar – 16 March 2015
- Captain Stuart Crawford Macbride – 16 March 2015
- Lesley Marian Macdonald – 16 March 2015
- John Raymond Brownsell – 26 March 2015
- Duncan Ian Callaghan – 26 March 2015
- Janet Margaret Baker – 26 March 2015
- The Reverend Philip John Carrington, MBE – 21 May 2015
- Christopher Murdock – 21 May 2015
- Jean Elizabeth Smith – 21 May 2015
- Elizabeth Mary Witt – 21 May 2015
- Darren James Bartholomew
- Ian Angus Campbell
- Patrick Joseph Halpin
- Gavin Melvin Jensen
- Dato’ Ng Keng Joo
- Alexander Graham Randall
- Eric Clive Wolhuter
- Dudleigh Eve Anderson
- Audrey Patricia McLennan

=== Officer of the Order of St John ===
- Dean Peter de la Mare
- Jonathan Nicolas Dexter
- Roderick Gray
- Graham Wilfred Benjamin Green
- Alan Hartley, MBE
- Allan-Bryan Hattingh
- John William Hougham, CBE
- Robin James Varwell Marlow
- Anthony James McGuirk, CBE QFSM
- Lieutenant Colonel Richard McQueen
- James Patrick Morgan
- Trevor Charles Moss
- His Grace The Duke of Atholl – 2 December 2015
- Alan James Popplewell
- Thomas Sefton, MBE
- Dr Ahmad Tajuddin Bin Mohamad Nor
- Tan Beng Lee
- Dato’ Sri Tee Boon Kee
- Wayne Tritton
- James Anthony Warlow
- Carl David Wheeler
- Clare Lorraine Crook
- Shirley Anne Day
- Veronica Novel Desilva
- Miss Moira DE Swardt
- Sally Elliott
- Kathryn Lawman
- Jane Marlow
- Christine Brenda McIntyre
- Elaine Kitty Smith
- Ms Hendrika Petronella Marjan van der Slik
- Julie Dawn Warlow
- Pamela Mary Wood
