= Mulready =

Mulready is a surname. Notable people with the surname include:

- Augustus Edwin Mulready (1844–1904), British painter
- David Mulready (born 1947), Australian Anglican bishop
- Glen Mulready (born 1960), American politician
- Sally Mulready, Irish public official
- William Mulready (1786–1863), Irish painter
