= 2015 Lancaster City Council election =

Map showing the results of the 2015 Lancaster City Council election

Local elections were held for Lancaster City Council on 7 May 2015, the same day as the 2015 United Kingdom general election and other 2015 United Kingdom local elections. Local elections are held every four years with all councillors up for election in multi-member electoral wards.

== Boundary review ==
The Local Government Boundary Commission for England reviewed the local boundaries of Lancaster council in 2014.

The number of councillors elected to Lancaster will not change although some electoral wards have been redrawn and renamed. The changes are made official by the Lancaster (Electoral Changes) Order 2014.

== Election results ==
Lancaster City Council Election, 2015
Party	Seats	Gains	Losses	Net gain/loss	Seats %	Votes %	Votes	+/−
Labour	29			+5	48.33	37		
Conservative	19			+3	31.68	29		
Green	9			+1	15.00	18		
MB Independent	2			-6	3.33	7		
Independent	1			-3	1.66	1		
Liberal Democrats	0			±0	0.00	3		

== Ward results ==
=== Bare Ward ===
Bare (3 councillors)
Party	Candidate	Votes	%	±%
Conservative	Brett Martin Cooper*	1288	13.58	−9.77
Conservative	Charles Edwards*	1179	12.43	−4.08
MB Independent	June Irene Ashworth*	1098	11.58	−20.27
MB Independent	Shirley Burns	1021	10.76	+10.76
MB Independent	Tony Anderson	932	9.83	−18.45
Labour	Dilys Mabel Greenhalgh	794	8.37	+8.37
Labour	Richard William Martin	782	8.24	+8.24
Labour	Valerie Joyce Rogerson	743	7.83	+7.83
UKIP	Mark Robert Nelson	603	6.36	+6.36
Green	Richard Laurence Moriaty	384	4.05	+4.05
Liberal Democrats	Michael Gradwell	372	3.92	+3.92
Green	Julia Frances Norman	298	3.14	+3.14
Turnout		9485	68	
Conservative gain from New Seat		Swing		
Conservative gain from MB Independent		Swing		
MB Independent hold		Swing		

=== Bolton and Slyne Ward ===
Bolton and Slyne (3 councillors)
Party	Candidate	Votes	%	±%
Conservative	Sylvia Anne Rogerson*	2019	18.77	−17.40
Conservative	James Malcolm Thomas*	1806	16.79	
Conservative	John Graeme Wild*	1795	16.69	
Independent	Keith William Budden	1328	12.35	−36.25
Labour	John Bouskill	820	7.62	
Labour	Sharron Gwendoline Hood	652	6.06	
Labour	Molly Christine Roberts	583	5.42	
Green	William Ian Birnie	473	4.40	
Green	Thomas Arnold Birnie	471	4.38	
Liberal Democrats	Harry Philip Armistead	419	4	
Independent	Sue Lomax	391	3.63	
Turnout		10757	71	
Conservative hold		Swing		
Conservative hold		Swing		
Conservative hold		Swing		

=== Bulk Ward ===
Bulk (3 councillors)
Party	Candidate	Votes	%	±%
Green	Tim Hamilton-Cox	1426	15.97	−0.27
Green	Caroline St Joan Jackson	1419	15.89	−
Green	Andrew Martin Kay*	1272	14.25	−1.54
Labour	Cathy Jamieson	1236	13.84	−0.66
Labour	Miles Nelson Taylor	1075	12.04	−2.19
Labour	Peter Leo Rivet	994	11.13	−0.67
Conservative	Howard Philip Dodgson	423	4.74	+0.79
Conservative	William Anthony Brooks	375	4.20	+0.27
UKIP	Matthew Jeremy Atkins	364	4.08	+4.08
Conservative	Nickey Jane Russell	344	3.85	+0.19
Turnout		8928	61	
Green hold		Swing		
Green hold		Swing		
Green hold		Swing		

=== Carnforth and Millhead Ward ===
Carnforth and Millhead (3 councillors)
Party	Candidate	Votes	%	±%
Conservative	Peter Allan Yates*	1405	19.38	−3.65
Conservative	Mel Guilding*	1238	17.07	+17.07
Conservative	Christopher Wallace Harold Leadbetter*	1184	16.33	−2.67
Labour	Paul Malcolm Gardner*	1027	14.16	−7.68
Labour	Bob Roe	981	13.53	−1.74
Labour	Fran Hanna	921	12.70	−5.03
Green	Kevin Frea	495	6.83	+6.83
Turnout		7251	65	
Conservative hold		Swing		
Conservative gain from Labour		Swing		
Conservative hold		Swing		

=== Castle Ward ===
Castle (2 councillors)
Party	Candidate	Votes	%	±%
Green	Dave Brookes*	1229	26.04	+2.73
Green	Nick Wilkinson*	959	20.32	+1.51
Labour	Tom Sweeney	682	14.45	+5.25
Labour	Peter James Wilson	631	13.37	+4.23
Conservative	Chris Brown	403	8.54	+2.82
Conservative	Ryan Martin Cushley-Spendiff	336	7.12	+3.26
Independent	Anthony Mark Cutter	249	5.28	+5.28
Liberal Democrats	Michael Mumford	142	3.01	+1.18
TUSC	Eugene Henry Michael Doherty	89	1.89	+1.89
Turnout		4720	59	
Green hold		Swing		
Green hold		Swing		

=== Ellel Ward ===
Ellel (2 councillors)
Party	Candidate	Votes	%	±%
Conservative	Helen Rebecca Helme*	1433	31.06	+2.52
Conservative	Susie Charles*	1305	28.28	−2.24
Labour	David John Hill	579	12.55	−3.11
Labour	Ben Whittingham	564	12.22	2.23
Green	Nicholas Martin Beddoe	422	9	+2.44
Green	Andrew Lee	311	6.74	+6.74
Turnout		4614	72	
Conservative hold		Swing		
Conservative hold		Swing		

=== Halton-with-Aughton ward ===
Halton with Aughton (1 councillor)
Party	Candidate	Votes	%	±%
Independent	Paul Woodruff*	577	38.36	−47.31
Green	Bob Bauld	423	28.13	+13.8
Conservative	Daniel Scott Gibbins	364	24.20	+24.20
Labour	Catarina Bridget Mary Finnerty	142	9.44	+9.44
Majority		154	10.24	−61.10
Turnout		1504	73	
Independent hold		Swing		

=== Harbour ward ===
Harbour (3 councillors)
Party	Candidate	Votes	%	±%
Labour	Janice Hanson*	1263	20.34	+0.13
Labour	Darren Keith Clifford*	1130	18.20	+1.20
Labour	David Whittaker*	1063	17.12	−0.47
UKIP	Steven Thomas Ogden	840	13.53	+13.53
Conservative	Pat Hibbins	722	11.63	+2.97
MB Independent	Jason Firth	439	7.07	−5.68
MB Independent	Terry Ingle	394	6.34	−4.48
Green	Joanne Lindsey Corless	359	5.78	+2.93
Turnout		6210	54	
Labour hold		Swing		
Labour hold		Swing		
Labour hold		Swing		

=== Heysham Central ward ===
Heysham Central (2 councillors)
Party	Candidate	Votes	%	±%
MB Independent	Geoff Knight*	779	21.13	−8.85
Labour	Carla Dianne Brayshaw	761	20.65	−1.27
Labour	David Ivan Brayshaw	760	20.62	+20.62
Conservative	Elliot Layfield	724	19.64	+19.64
MB Independent	Cary Jane Matthews	662	17.96	+17.96
MB Independent hold		Swing		
Labour gain from Independent		Swing		
Turnout		3686	60	

=== Heysham North ward ===
Heysham North (2 councillors)
Party	Candidate	Votes	%	±%
Labour	Margaret Elizabeth Pattison*	795	25.40	−1.73
Labour	Ronald Sands*	705	22.52	−2.45
Conservative	Adam Martin Towers	491	15.69	+15.69
UKIP	Dave Porter	470	15.02	+15.02
MB Independent	James Carlton Fletcher	262	8.37	−10.58
MB Independent	Geoffrey Wilson	245	7.83	−6.49
Green	Ulrike Andrea Hildegard Zeshan	162	5.18	+1.35
Turnout		3130	53	
Labour hold		Swing		
Labour hold		Swing		

=== Heysham South ward ===
Heysham South (3 councillors)
Party	Candidate	Votes	%	±%
Conservative	Stuart Bateson	1390	22.39	+5.65
Labour	Alan Biddulph	952	15.33	+3.34
Labour	Colin Hartley	871	14.03	+2.15
Conservative	Richard William Rollins	854	13.75	−0.41
MB Independent	Mike Greenall	740	11.92	−4.26
Labour	Ian Withnell Clift	729	11.74	+11.74
UKIP	Mark Knight	673	10.84	+10.84
Turnout		6209	62	
Conservative hold		Swing		
Labour gain from MB Independent		Swing		
Labour gain from Conservative		Swing		

=== John O'Gaunt ward ===
John O'Gaunt (3 councillors)
Party	Candidate	Votes	%	±%
Labour	Mary Eileen Blamire*	1605	16.35	−1.25
Labour	Elizabeth Scott*	1466	14.93	−1.95
Labour	Richard Newman-Thompson*	1300	13.24	−1.25
Conservative	Ali Dodgson	960	9.78	+2.51
Green	Chris Watkins	950	9.68	−1.7
Green	Heather Hilton	842	8.58	+0.46
Conservative	Mick Jackson	800	8.15	+1.82
Conservative	Luke Joseph Worrall	792	8.07	+3.35
Green	Rebecca Kate Whittle	706	7.19	+0.67
Liberal Democrats	Phil Dunster	397	4.04	+0.90
Turnout		9818	63	
Labour hold		Swing		
Labour hold		Swing		
Labour hold		Swing		

=== Kellet ward ===
Kellet (1 councillor)
Party	Candidate	Votes	%	±%
Conservative	John Roger Mace*	982	73.45	−3.34
Labour	Jean Taylor	216	16.16	+0.11
Green	Mark Miles Westcombe	139	10.40	+3.24
Majority		766	57.29	−3.45
Turnout		1337	78	
Conservative hold		Swing	-4.74	

=== Lower Lune Valley ward ===
Lower Lune Valley (2 councillors)
Party	Candidate	Votes	%	±%
Conservative	Joan Parkinson Jackson	1375	27.29	+2.30
Conservative	Jane Parkinson	1270	25.20	+3.68
Liberal Democrats	Joyce Pritchard	718	14.25	−3.04
Labour	Tamsin Stacey Hartley	517	10.24	+3.16
Labour	Ryan Anderson Bartle	391	7.76	+1.49
Green	Mike Wright	300	5.95	+1.62
Green	Jan Maskell	247	4.90	+4.90
Liberal Democrats	Marco Ciciriello	221	4.39	−13.10
Turnout		5039	76	
Conservative hold		Swing		
Conservative hold		Swing		

=== Marsh Ward ===
Marsh (2 councillors)
Party	Candidate	Votes	%	±%
Green	Jon Barry*	1323	29.36	
Green	Rebecca Joy Novell*	941	20.88	
Labour	Andrew James Gierke	630	13.98	
Labour	Valerie Jean Pearson	599	13.29	
Conservative	Gus Thomas Rankin	334	7.41	
Conservative	Holly Elspeth Port Sheppard	313	6.94	
Independent	Michael Alan Loat	254	5.64	
Liberal Democrats	Mark Warburton	112	2.49	
Turnout		4506	65	
Green hold		Swing	n/a	
Green hold		Swing	n/a	

=== Overton Ward ===
Overton (1 councillor)
Party	Candidate	Votes	%	±%
Conservative	Andrew Paul Gardiner*	488	42.80	+42.80
Independent	Keith Snowden	329	28.86	−38.31
Labour	John Bouskill	329	23.24	−9.11
Green	Pamela Jill Virgoe White	58	5.08	+5.08
Majority		159	13.94	−20.41
Turnout		1140	64	
Conservative gain from Independent		Swing		

=== Poulton ward ===
Poulton (2 councillors)
Party	Candidate	Votes	%	±%
Labour	Brendan Anthony Hughes	656	20.97	+8.14
Labour	Terrie Metcalfe	594	18.98	+6.72
MB Independent	Tricia Heath	431	13.77	+3.13
UKIP	Godfrey Samuel Danson	426	13.61	+7.1
Conservative	Graham Charles Agnew	398	13.61	+6.26
MB Independent	Vicky Boyd-Power	285	9.11	−0.31
Green	Clare Mary Long-Summers	189	6.04	+6.04
Green	Becky Stevens	150	4.79	+4.79
Turnout		3129	52	
Labour hold		Swing		
Labour hold		Swing		

=== Scotforth East ward ===
Scotforth East (2 councillors)
Party	Candidate	Votes	%	±%
Labour	Patricia Anne Whitehead	937	20.92	+1.43
Labour	James Joseph Leyshon	835	18.64	+1.47
Conservative	Daniel Charles Orrell Aldred	820	18.30	+1.1
Conservative	Helen Killoran Wilson	670	14.96	−0.29
Liberal Democrats	Robin Eamonn Long	355	7.92	−4.19
Green	Frank Ledwith	326	7.28	+1.71
Green	Gisela Christine Renolds	289	6.45	+1.96
Liberal Democrats	Kyran Darnton	248	5.54	−3.17
Turnout		4480	70	
Labour hold		Swing		
Labour gain from Conservative		Swing		

=== Scotforth West ward ===
Scotforth West (3 councillors)
Party	Candidate	Votes	%	±%
Labour	Sheila Elizabeth Denwood*	1,639	15.55	−1.3
Green	Abi Mills	1,579	14.98	+3.42
Labour	Ronnie Kershaw	1127	10.69	−0.79
Green	Chris Norman	1091	10.01	−2.84
Green	Paul Byron Stubbins	1081	7.76	−3.29
Labour	John Raymond Whitehead	993	9.50	−1.66
Conservative	Val Outram	912	8.73	+0.41
Conservative	Janet Suzanne Walton	794	7.60	−0.7
Conservative	Kevan Stuart Walton	776	7.43	+0.29
Liberal Democrats	Rebecca Long	229	2.19	−1.15
TUSC	Steve Metcalfe	117	1.12	+1.12
Turnout		10450	70	
Labour hold		Swing		
Green hold		Swing		
Labour hold		Swing		

=== Silverdale ward ===
Silverdale (1 councillor)
Party	Candidate	Votes	%	±%
Conservative	Nigel Goodrich	400	29.94	−33.19
Independent	Sarah Margaret Debonnaire Fishwick	358	26.8	+26.8
Liberal Democrats	June Greenwell	327	24.48	+24.48
Green	Rex Andrew Ambler	142	10.63	−9.39
Labour	Brenda Daphne Florence Rockall	109	8.16	−8.69
Majority		42	3.14	−39.97
Turnout		1336	79	
Conservative hold		Swing		

=== Skerton East ward ===
Skerton East (3 councillors)
Party	Candidate	Votes	%	±%
Labour	Robert Michael Redfern*	1237	18.97	−4.74
Labour	Abbott Clifton Bryning*	1214	18.56	−5.03
Labour	Janet Tracy Hall*	1202	18.37	−6.09
Conservative	Jennifer George	848	13.00	+1.52
Green	David Charles Fleet	550	8.41	+8.41
Green	Jean Peggy O'Neill	514	7.86	+7.86
Green	Stephen Christopher Riley	455	7.0	+7.0
Independent	Steven Andrew Swarbrick	232	3.55	
Turnout		6252	52	
Labour hold		Swing		
Labour hold		Swing		
Labour hold		Swing		

=== Skerton West ward ===
Skerton West (3 councillors)
Party	Candidate	Votes	%	±%
Labour	Karen Leytham*	1481	21.34	−6.7
Labour	Rob Devey	1331	19.18	−7.88
Labour	Roger James Sherlock*	1241	17.88	−1.18
Conservative	Graham Charles Agnew	1037	14.94	+0.02
UKIP	Niall Semple	816	11.76	+11.76
Green	Michael Jonathon Riley	380	5.46	−5.46
Green	Harris Kaloudis	360	5.19	+5.19
Independent	John Thomas Harrison	295	4.25	+4.25
Turnout		6941	60	
Labour hold		Swing		
Labour hold		Swing		
Labour hold		Swing		

=== Torrisholme ward ===
Torrisholme (2 councillors)
Party	Candidate	Votes	%	±%
Conservative	Phillippa Williamson	901	21.51	+9.25
Labour	Andrew James Warriner	666	15.90	+5.80
MB Independent	Roger Thomas Dennison*	610	14.57	+1.08
Labour	John Robert Reynolds	585	14.49	+4.39
MB Independent	Geoff Marsland*	554	13.23	+0.75
UKIP	Robert Wilson Gillespie	504	12.03	+12.03
Liberal Democrats	Thomas Henry Barney	192	4.58	−1.28
Green	Daren Christian Chandisingh	176	4.20	+0.37
Turnout		4188	68	
Conservative hold		Swing		
Labour gain from MB Independent		Swing		

=== University and Scotforth Rural ward ===
University and Scotforth Rural (3 councillors)
Party	Candidate	Votes	%	±%
Labour	Lucy Elizabeth Beckett Atkinson	605	13.69	−13.74
Green	Sam Armstrong	555	12.56	−0.08
Labour	Matt Mann	500	11.31	−12.04
Labour	Clare Anne Robinson	480	10.84	−12.51
Green	Jo Gadsden	440	9.95	−1.35
Green	Jack Benjamin Filmore	417	9.43	+9.43
Conservative	Dan Astley	405	9.16	+0.76
Conservative	Lee Antony Dickson	391	8.85	+1.27
Conservative	Ice Bing Dong	339	7.67	+7.67
Liberal Democrats	Pippa Jane Hepworth	143	3.24	−1.74
Liberal Democrats	Jamie Edward Robert Lawson	79	1.79	−2.52
Liberal Democrats	Oliver Hartland Mountjoy	66	1.49	+1.49
Turnout		4420	74	
Labour hold		Swing		
Green hold		Swing		
Labour hold		Swing		

=== Upper Lune Valley ward ===
Upper Lune Valley (1 councillor)
Party	Candidate	Votes	%	±%
Conservative	Peter Thomas Williamson*	1103	73.00	−1.95
Labour	Jack Nelson Hoad	221	14.63	+14.63
Green	Catriona Stamp	187	12.38	−12.67
Majority		882	58.37	+8.46
Turnout		1511	77	
Conservative hold		Swing		

=== Warton ward ===
Warton (1 councillor)
Party	Candidate	Votes	%	±%
Conservative	Susan Gail Sykes	529	43.33	−7.21
Labour	Janette Gardner	266	21.79	−14.62
Independent	Stuart Langhorn	248	20.31	+20.31
Green	Sue Tyldesley	178	14.58	+1.54
Majority		263	21.54	+7.41
Turnout		1121	73	
Conservative hold		Swing		

=== Westgate ward ===
Westgate (3 councillors)
Party	Candidate	Votes	%	±%
Labour	Tracy Michelle Brown	1279	20.28	+4.42
Labour	David Smith	1261	20.00	+4.17
Labour	Claire Emily Cozler	1115	17.68	+1.85
Conservative	Joseph Peter Wilson	985	15.62	+7.16
UKIP	Michelle Ogden	970	15.38	+15.38
MB Independent	Barry Vickers	696	11.04	−5.2
Turnout		6306	56	
Labour gain from MB Independent		Swing		
Labour hold		Swing		
Labour hold		Swing		

== Wards ==
Electoral wards in Lancaster, 2015
Ward	Number of councillors
Bare	3
Bolton and Slyne	3
Bulk	3
Carnforth and Millhead	3
Castle	2
Ellel	2
Halton-with-Aughton	1
Harbour	3
Heysham Central	2
Heysham North	2
Heysham South	3
John O'Gaunt	3
Kellet	1
Lower Lune Valley	2
Marsh	2
Overton	1
Poulton	2
Scotforth East	2
Scotforth West	3
Silverdale	1
Skerton East	3
Skerton West	3
Torrisholme	2
University and Scotforth Rural	3
Upper Lune Valley	1
Warton	1
Westgate	3

== See also ==
- Lancaster
