= Boticca =

- Type: Private
- Industry: Jewelry, fashion accessories
- Founded: October 2009
- Founder: Kiyan Foroughi, Avid Larizadeh
- Headquarters: London, England
- Area served: Global
- Products: Jewelry, Handbags, Fashion accessories
- Website: Boticca.com

Boticca was a London-based retail website for jewelry and fashion accessories, that featured a selection of emerging fashion designers.

== History ==
Kiyan Foroughi, a French former investment banker while on holiday in Marrakesh in December 2008, engaged in conversation with jewelry designer Mariam. Living in the Atlas Mountains, Mariam travelled to the souq in Marrakesh three times a week to sell her jewelry, mainly to tourists. Foroughi decided to launch a retail website with co-founder Avid Larizadeh selling emerging designers like Mariam.

Since launching in January 2010, the company featured in Vogue, and worn by Kate Moss, Cameron Diaz and Jessica Alba.

In the company's first round of funding, Boticca raised $2.5M, led by ISAI and joined by Japanese Internet incubator Digital Garage. In its second round in September 2013 it raised an additional $4 million (£2.44m), led by UK venture capital firm MMC Ventures, and high-net-worth individuals, including Sina Afra.

In April 2014, co-founder Avid Larizadeh, left Boticca operationally in her role as COO while remaining a founding shareholder of the business.

In September 2014, Boticca unveiled a fully rebranded website with major UI improvements, a novel content strategy, a shipping partnership with DHL and the appointment of Dave Killeen (formerly Product Lead at Badoo and Executive Product Manager for the BBC iPlayer) as Product Director.

In October 2014, Boticca appointed former Liberty Fashion Director and MyWardrobe Buying and Merchandising Director Luisa De Paula as the new Fashion & Brand Director.

In August 2015, Boticca was acquired by Wolf & Badger.

As of June 2020, Boticca.com redirects to the Wolf & Badger website.

== Operations ==
The company took only a maximum 35% of the sale price, as opposed to the normal online retail model of between 40% and 50%, leaving the creator with 65%. The company garnered between 30 and 40 new retail designer applications each week, of which on average just 3 or 4 were listed on the website. The company also sourced through two in-house style hunters, who through researching through web, magazines, blogs, trade shows and fashion weeks spotted new talent, and hence sourced around 90% of the newly listed product. Global designers could apply to be featured, but all designers had to uphold the "Designer Charter" in order to ensure quality of both product and customer service.

By January 2011 Boticca was retailing independent designers from over 40 countries, including Estonia, Lebanon, South Korea the United Arab Emirates and Colombia. 155 of the 350 brands sold through the website led on jewelry, whilst the rest covered accessories such as bags, scarves, belts and hats. After the second round of fund raising, the company launched Boticca.fr in September 2013, making France the companies' third biggest market after the UK and United States.

== Awards ==
The Independent rated it first in their 2014 survey of the top six jewelry retail websites.
