= James Woodham =

Brigadier James Woodham CBE MC
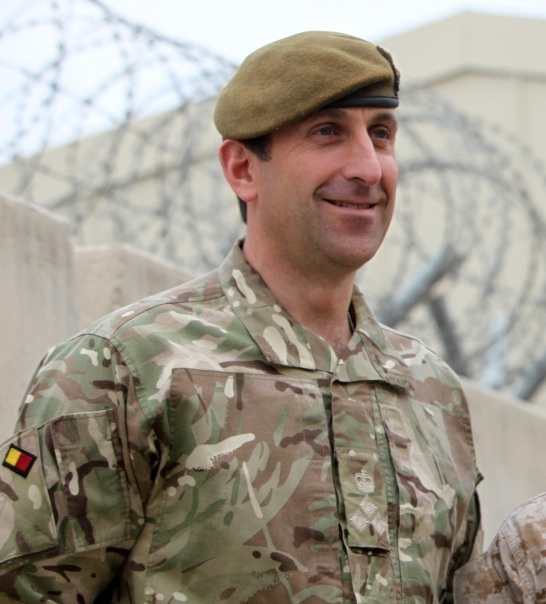
- Brigadier Woodham in 2014
- Military career
- Allegiance: United Kingdom
- Branch: British Army
- Service years: 1986–2019
- Rank: Brigadier
- Commands: Task Force Helmand; 7th Armoured Brigade; 1st Battalion, Royal Anglian Regiment
- Conflicts: Iraq War; War in Afghanistan
- Awards: Commander of the Order of the British Empire; Military Cross

Brigadier James Medley Woodham, CBE, MC is a retired senior officer of the British Army.

== Military career ==
Woodham was commissioned into the Royal Anglian Regiment on 9 August 1986. He was awarded the Military Cross (MC) for services in Iraq in 2005. He was deployed to Helmand Province, Afghanistan, in 2008 as commanding officer of the 1st Battalion, Royal Anglian Regiment He went on to be chief of staff of 1st (United Kingdom) Division in January 2011 and commander of 7th Armoured Brigade in January 2013 and was deployed as commander of Task Force Helmand in October 2013. After that he became Head of Training and Education for the Army in July 2015, and Director of Operational Capability at the Ministry of Defence in August 2017.

Woodham was appointed an Officer of the Order of the British Empire in the 2011 Birthday Honours, and advanced to Commander of the Order of the British Empire in the 2015 Special Honours.
