= Martin Griffiths (judge) =

British judge

The Honourable Mr Justice Griffiths
- Royal coat of arms of the United Kingdom

High Court Judge King's Bench Division
- Incumbent
- Assumed office 1 October 2019
- Monarch: Charles III

Personal details
- Born: 27 April 1962 (age 64) United Kingdom
- Education: New College, Oxford

Sir Martin Alexander Griffiths (born 27 April 1962) is a British High Court judge.

Griffiths was educated at the City of London School and attended New College, Oxford on an open scholarship, taking a first-class BA in modern history and modern languages in 1984 which was promoted to an MA in 1988. After his undergraduate studies, he completed a graduate diploma in law at City University in 1985 and his vocational barrister training at the Inns of Court School of Law.

He was called to the bar at Inner Temple in 1986; he volunteered at Waterloo Legal Advice Service from 1988 to 1993. In practice, he specialised in commercial law and practised from Essex Court Chambers. He took silk in 2006, served as a recorder from 2009 to 2019, and was appointed a deputy High Court judge in 2016. He was a member of the Bar Council from 2008 to 2015.

On 1 October 2019, Griffiths was appointed a judge of the High Court and assigned to the Queen's Bench Division, replacing Dame Nicola Davies who was promoted to the Court of Appeal. He took the customary knighthood in the same year. Since 2022, he has been Presiding Judge of the Wales circuit, succeeding Sir Simon Picken.

In 1995, he married Susan Burden (a barrister), with whom he has two sons and a daughter. He is multilingual and speaks French and Italian.

In 2023, he was cited in a Tax Avoidance scheme by HMRC along with 3 other senior judges, since 2011 he has been an investor in Cobalt Data Centre 2 LLP scheme, which involved enterprise zone tax credits and promised an immediate 67 per cent tax profit to investors.
