= Trial of Carla Foster =

2023 UK legal case

The trial of Carla Foster took place after a British mother of three children was prosecuted under UK criminal law for carrying out an abortion too late into her pregnancy in May 2020 during the COVID-19 pandemic. Foster was convicted in Stoke-on-Trent Crown Court by Justice Edward Pepperall "for administering drugs or using instruments to procure an abortion" under the Offences Against the Person Act 1861.

On 12 June 2023 Pepperall sentenced Foster to a 28-month custodial term, at least 14 months of which would have to be spent in prison. The case provoked widespread outrage and considerable debate in the United Kingdom as a result of the perceived harshness of the prosecution as well as the fitness for purpose and age of abortion laws. Following a hearing at London's Court of Appeal, Foster's sentence was reduced to a 14-month suspended sentence, meaning she would be freed from prison.

== The case ==
Foster carried out the abortion after procuring the necessary drugs through a remote consultation under the "pills by post" scheme introduced in England and Wales during the COVID-19 pandemic lockdown. Foster discovered she was pregnant in December 2019 before arranging a telephone consultation with the British Pregnancy Advisory Service (BPAS) in May 2020. On May 11 Foster had entered labour and delivered a stillborn at her home, attended by emergency services. There was no sign the child took an independent breath, according to the prosecution.

== Trial and sentencing ==
In June 2023 Foster was sentenced to a 28-month prison term for inducing an abortion in a gestational range the coroner estimated at 32 to 34 weeks of pregnancy. The ceiling for legal abortion in England and Wales is 24 weeks' and after 10 weeks such a procedure must be carried out in a clinic. Justice Pepperall ruled that half of the defendant's sentence should be spent in custody. He added that if Foster had pleaded guilty at the earliest opportunity at magistrates court, the custodial sentence could have been suspended.

Foster was initially charged with the statutory offence of child destruction, punishable by life imprisonment, which she denied. She subsequently pleaded guilty to a charge under section 58 of the Offences Against the Person Act 1861 for administering drugs or using instruments to procure an abortion, which was accepted by the prosecution.

The prosecution alleged Foster told police in an interview that she had lied to BPAS about how far along her pregnancy was to obtain the pills. The defence argued that lockdown and restrictions on face-to-face appointments impaired access to healthcare, leaving the defendant reliant on information from the internet.

During sentencing, which took place at Stoke-on-Trent Crown Court on 12 June 2023, Pepperall accepted that the defendant was "wracked by guilt", showed "genuine remorse" and had suffered depression. He observed that she was a good mother to three children, one of whom has special needs and would suffer from her imprisonment.

Prior to sentencing, groups including the Royal College of Obstetricians and Gynaecologists and the Royal College of Midwives wrote to Pepperall to "plead to Your Honour to consider leniency in this case … we are fearful that if the case before you receives a custodial sentence it may signal to other women who access tele-medical abortion services, or who experience later gestation deliveries, that they risk imprisonment if they seek medical care."

Pepperall responded by telling the defendant that the letter was inappropriate. The authors were "concerned that your imprisonment might deter other women from accessing telemedical abortion services and other late-gestation women from seeking medical care or from being open and honest with medical professionals," he said. He went on to state that the letter also, "Has the capacity to be seen as special pleading by those who favour wider access to abortions and is, in my judgment, just as inappropriate as it would be for a judge to receive a letter from one of the groups campaigning for more restrictive laws". Pepperall concluded that, "If the medical profession considers that judges are wrong to imprison women who procure a late abortion outside the 24-week limit then it should lobby Parliament to change that law and not judges who are charged with the duty of applying the law."

The day before the sentencing, at its AGM, and having anticipated a criminal conviction as Foster faced sentencing "under Victorian era law", Humanists UK unanimously passed an emergency motion stating that, "In light of growing threats to the right to abortion, this meeting reaffirms the support of Humanists UK for the decriminalisation of abortion in England and Wales." The organisation had previously urged decriminalisation of abortion to protect women's rights after revealing that the UK Government "unilaterally removed 'women's reproductive and sexual rights' from a multinational statement on women's rights. This happened not long after the US Supreme Court had overturned Roe v Wade."

== Sentencing aftermath ==
The sentence handed down by Justice Pepperall was widely criticised. Noting that the legislation the defendant was sentenced under dated back to 1861, the chief executive of BPAS Clare Murphy said she was "shocked and appalled" by the woman's sentence which was based on an "archaic law". "No woman can ever go through this again," she said. Murphy noted that, "Over the last three years, there has been an increase in the numbers of women and girls facing the trauma of lengthy police investigations and threatened with up to life imprisonment under our archaic abortion law. Vulnerable women in the most incredibly difficult of circumstances deserve more from our legal system."

Chiara Capraro, head of women's rights programs at Amnesty International UK was quoted by the Telegraph saying that, "It is shocking – and quite frankly terrifying – that in 2023 a woman in the UK has been sentenced to jail because of a law dating back to 1861. Access to abortion is essential healthcare and should be managed as such. This is a tremendously sad story and underscores the desperate need for legal reform in relation to reproductive health."

Dame Diana Johnson, who previously tried to repeal the 1861 Offences Against the Person Act with a backbench bill, said ministers should act to change laws that were also having a "chilling" effect on doctors, midwives and others.

Labour MP Stella Creasy called for "urgent reform" of the law. In a tweet whose contents she expanded on in an interview with Sky News, Creasy said, "The average prison sentence for a violent offence in England is 18 months. A woman who had an abortion without following correct procedures just got 28 months under an 1868 act – we need urgent reform to make safe access for all women in England, Scotland and Wales a human right."

Mandu Reid, leader of the Women's Equality Party, stated: "I am devastated for the woman at the centre of this case, and for her children, who have been forcibly separated from their mum. This conviction serves no one, not her, not her children, not the public interest. All it does is punish a woman for seeking healthcare in the middle of a pandemic and risk deterring women who want or need an abortion from seeking that care in future. No one deserves to be criminalised for seeking healthcare, which is a human right."

The Crown Prosecution Service, which authorised the prosecution, stated: "These exceptionally rare cases are complex and traumatic. Our prosecutors have a duty to ensure that laws set by Parliament are properly considered and applied when making difficult charging decisions." The Society for the Protection of Unborn Children called it a "horrifying case" that involved a "fully viable baby of eight months." Its spokesperson opined that, "The real fault in this tragedy lies strongly with abortion providers who pushed for dangerous home abortions, and are now using this case to push for abortion up to birth."

Conservative MP Caroline Noakes, chairwoman of the House of Commons Women and Equalities Committee, also joined calls for reform of the 1861 legislation used to prosecute Foster. She told the BBC's World Tonight programme that MPs should "decide in the 21st Century whether we should be relying on legislation that is centuries old. This is not something that has been debated in any great detail for many years now, and cases like this, although tragic and thankfully very rare, throw into sharp relief that we are relying on legislation that is very out of date. It makes a case for Parliament to start looking at this issue in detail." The day after the prosecution, a spokesperson for Prime Minister Rishi Sunak stated that they were not yet aware of any plans to change abortion laws.

== National march and protest ==
In the days after the sentence was passed, outrage from feminist groups at Foster's prosecution spread and grew. Women's rights groups including The Fawcett Society (founded in 1866, just five years after the Offences Against the Person Act 1861 was ratified by parliament), the Women's Equality Party and BPAS organised a national protest and march to demand reform of abortion law. The march was planned to take place in London Saturday 17 June 2023, convening at the Royal Courts of Justice and marching 1.2 miles to the Palace of Westminster.

== Court of Appeal hearing ==
On 18 July 2023, an appeal hearing against the sentence took place at the Court of Appeal in London, before Dame Victoria Sharp, sitting with Lord Justice Holroyde and Mrs Justice Lambert. The Court reduced Foster's sentence to a 14-month suspended sentence, allowing her to be released from prison. Announcing the Court's decision, Sharp described the case as a "very sad case" and one "that calls for compassion, not punishment".
