= Avid Larizadeh Duggan =

Iranian-French-American entrepreneur

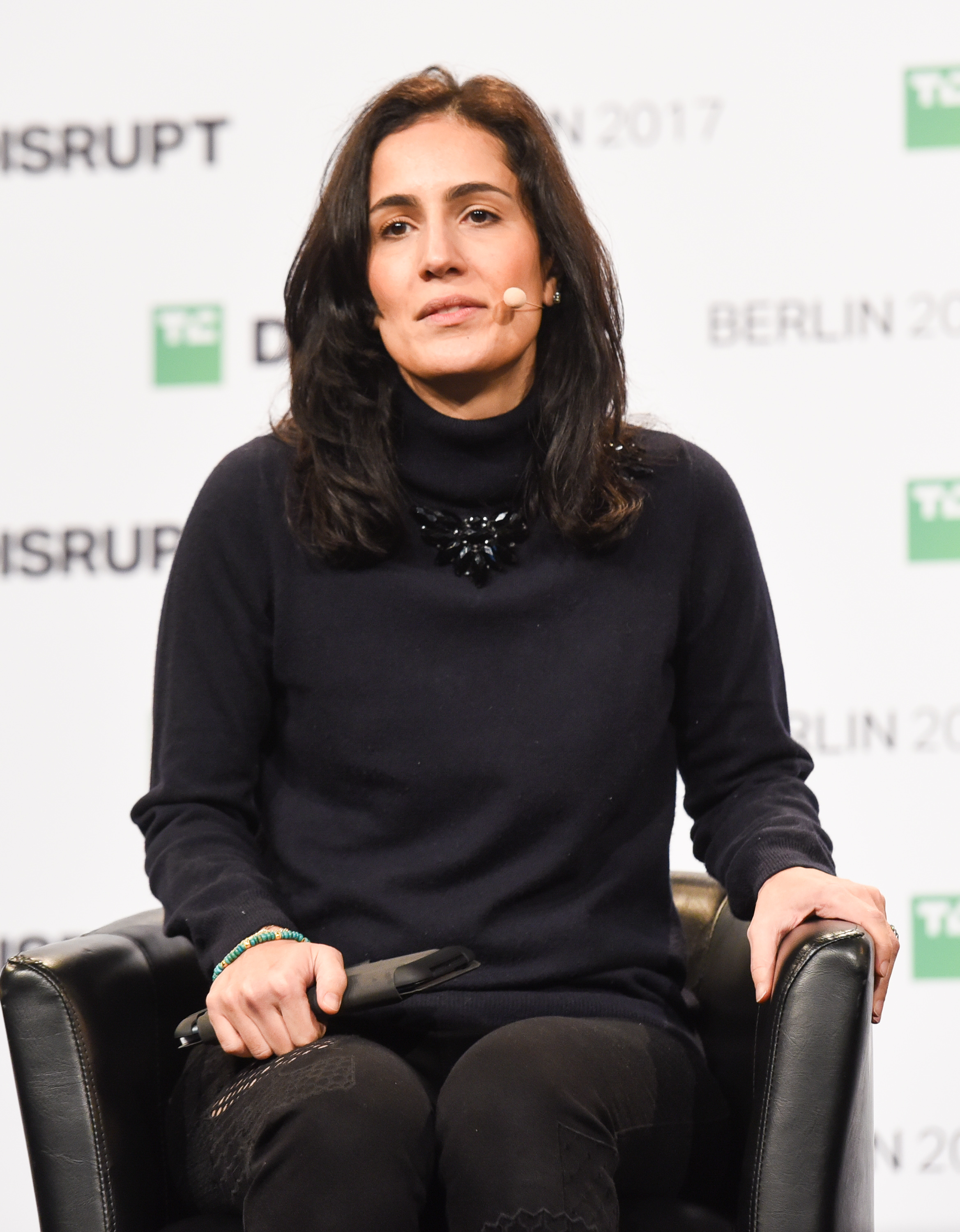
- Avid Larizadeh Duggan at TechCrunch Disrupt Berlin 2017
- Born: 1978 or 1979; Dallas, Texas
- Occupations: entrepreneur and venture capitalist

Avid Larizadeh-Duggan OBE (born 1978 or 1979) is an Iranian-French-American entrepreneur and venture capitalist. She is a managing director at Ontario Teachers’ Pension Plan Innovation Platform, EMEA and is a non executive director of Barclays Bank UK.

She is a Mayfield Fellow and a Kauffman Fellow. In 2016 she was named one of the World Economic Forum's "Young Global Leaders" and in 2019 was appointed an OBE.

== Early life ==
Larizadeh Duggan was born in Dallas, Texas, right before the Iranian Revolution. She has a sister, Roxanna Larizadeh. They are the grandchildren of Kazem Khosrowshahi, the cofounder of pharmaceutical conglomerate KBC – a company nationalized in 1980 after the Iranian Revolution. Kazem Khosrowshahi entered politics in August 1977 as Minister of Commerce, but his tenure was short lived due to the Revolution. Larizadeh Duggan's father, also an entrepreneur, and her mother had to leave Iran in 1979 and start over in Europe where they immigrated. Larizadeh Duggan and her sister grew up in Paris, France.

== Education ==
Larizadeh Duggan attended L’Ecole Active Bilingue Jeannine Manuel before studying at Stanford University, where she graduated with a bachelor's degree in 2000 and master's degree in 2001 both in engineering. While at Stanford, Larizadeh Duggan was a Mayfield Fellow and a Member of Stanford's Women Honor Society, Cap and Gown.

Larizadeh Duggan also has an MBA from Harvard Business School where she graduated in 2006.

== Career ==
While studying at Stanford University, she worked for Linkexchange (acquired by Microsoft in 1998) and Tellme Networks (Acquired by Microsoft in 2007).

After graduating from Stanford, she joined eBay on the product management team. She launched eBay's first suite of global online selling tools, Selling Manager and Selling Manager Pro, for which she holds a patent. She also led the design and launch of eBay's picture services.

While at Harvard Business School, she also worked in product management at Skype Technologies. In 2006 after graduating from Harvard Business School, she joined Accel Partners in London as an Associate where she focused on software and Internet investments.

She left Accel Partners in 2009 to cofound Boticca, a global marketplace for independent brands of fashion accessories, where she was the COO, running product, engineering and editorial. Boticca was featured in Vogue, selected by Lady Gaga for her 2011 European tour, and worn by Kate Moss, Cameron Diaz and Jessica Alba. Boticca was acquired by Wolf & Badger.

In 2014 Larizadeh Duggan joined Google Ventures (now GV) as the only female General Partner when GV launched its European fund. She was an investor, director and advisor to a variety of businesses, most in the software and Internet domain, including Kobalt, Lost My Name, Yieldify, Resolution Games and Breather.

In February 2018, she left GV to join Kobalt, one of her portfolio companies as EVP Group, Chief Strategy and Business Officer. She now serves as Chief Operating Officer.

Larizadeh Duggan was appointed as a non-executive director of Barclays UK in 2017.

In 2016 she was named one of the World Economic Forum's "Young Global Leaders".

Larizadeh Duggan has been named one of the 50 most inspiring female influencers, entrepreneurs, business leaders, academics and policy makers from across Europe three years in a row from 2015 to 2017. She has been named as “one of the most influential European female VCs” by Tech.eu “one of the 50 most influential women in UK IT” by Computer Weekly.

In 2019, she was appointed Honorary Officer of the Order of the British Empire, for services to the economy, business and education.

In 2020, she was asked by the then Prime Minister of the UK, Theresa May, to jointly lead a study on the competitiveness of the UK's tech sector. The report was published in May 2021. In 2025, she was appointed to the UK Council for Science and Technology (CST), which advises the Prime Minister and the Cabinet on strategic science and technology policy issues that cut across government departments.

In 2021, she joined Ontario Teachers’ Pension Plan as managing director of their Innovation Platform EMEA.

In 2022, she joined Taxfix’s board of directors.

== Interests ==
Larizadeh Duggan has been involved with various organizations linked to education. She is on the Harvard Business School European Advisory Board. She is also on the Board of Trustees of Founders4Schools. She led Code.org in the UK, founded by her cousins Hadi and Ali Partovi, and helped over 13 million people try an hour of code in the UK. She has contributed to Forbes and the World Economic Forum.

== Personal life ==
She lives in London with her husband and two daughters.
