= Alistair MacDonald =

British judge

The Honourable Mr Justice MacDonald
- Royal coat of arms of the United Kingdom

Justice of the High Court
- Incumbent
- Assumed office 2 June 2015

Personal details
- Born: Alistair William Orchard MacDonald; 22 February 1970 (age 56)
- Spouse: Penelope MacDonald
- Education: University of Nottingham; City University
- Occupation: Judge; Barrister; Queen's Counsel

Sir Alistair William Orchard MacDonald (born 22 February 1970), styled The Hon. Mr Justice MacDonald, has been a judge in the Family Division of the High Court of England and Wales since 2 June 2015. (Note: There is another Alistair MacDonald QC who was chair of the Bar Council in 2015.) As a barrister he specialised in child protection.

== Career ==
MacDonald received a BA in Archaeology from the University of Nottingham and worked as an archaeologist for three years, without obtaining grant funding for an offered Ph.D. position. He then obtained a Diploma in Law from City University.

MacDonald was called to the bar in 1995 and undertook pupillage at Priory Chambers, 2 Fountain Court. In 2008 he won Barrister of the Year at the Birmingham Law Society Legal Awards, and later that year appeared on the BBC television series Barristers.

He became a Recorder in 2009, and QC in 2011. He practised in family law, particularly the rights of children. He was co-chairman of the Association of Lawyers for Children, speaking out against reductions in legal aid increases in court fees for local authorities, and a reduction of family law barrister fees. He is on the board of the journal Child and Family Law Quarterly.

He was made a Knight Bachelor on 10 November 2015.

The case of Alta Fixsler, a two year old Haredi girl from Manchester, England who was placed on a ventilator after a severe brain injury came before MacDonald. The case drew international attention after MacDonald ruled on May 21, 2021 that her life support be withdrawn.

=== Works ===
- MacDonald, Alistair (March 2011). The Rights of the Child – Law and Practice. Jordan Publishing. ISBN 9781846612107.

New Law Journal said "This book is the reference work for the family advocate who wishes to use the CRC on behalf of the children they represent."
