= Clive Freedman =

British barrister and High Court judge

Sir Benjamin Clive Freedman (born 16 November 1955), styled The Honourable Mr Justice Freedman is a British barrister and High Court judge.

== Life ==
Freedman was educated at Manchester Grammar School and Pembroke College, Cambridge (1974–77). He was called to the bar, Middle Temple, in 1978 and took silk in 1997. As a barrister, Freedman worked on a number of high profile cases. He was a Recorder between 2000 and 2018 and a Deputy High Court judge between 2003 and 2018. He was appointed as a Justice of the High Court assigned to the Queen's Bench in October 2018. He was knighted in June 2019.
