= David Waksman =

British judge

The Honourable Mr Justice Waksman
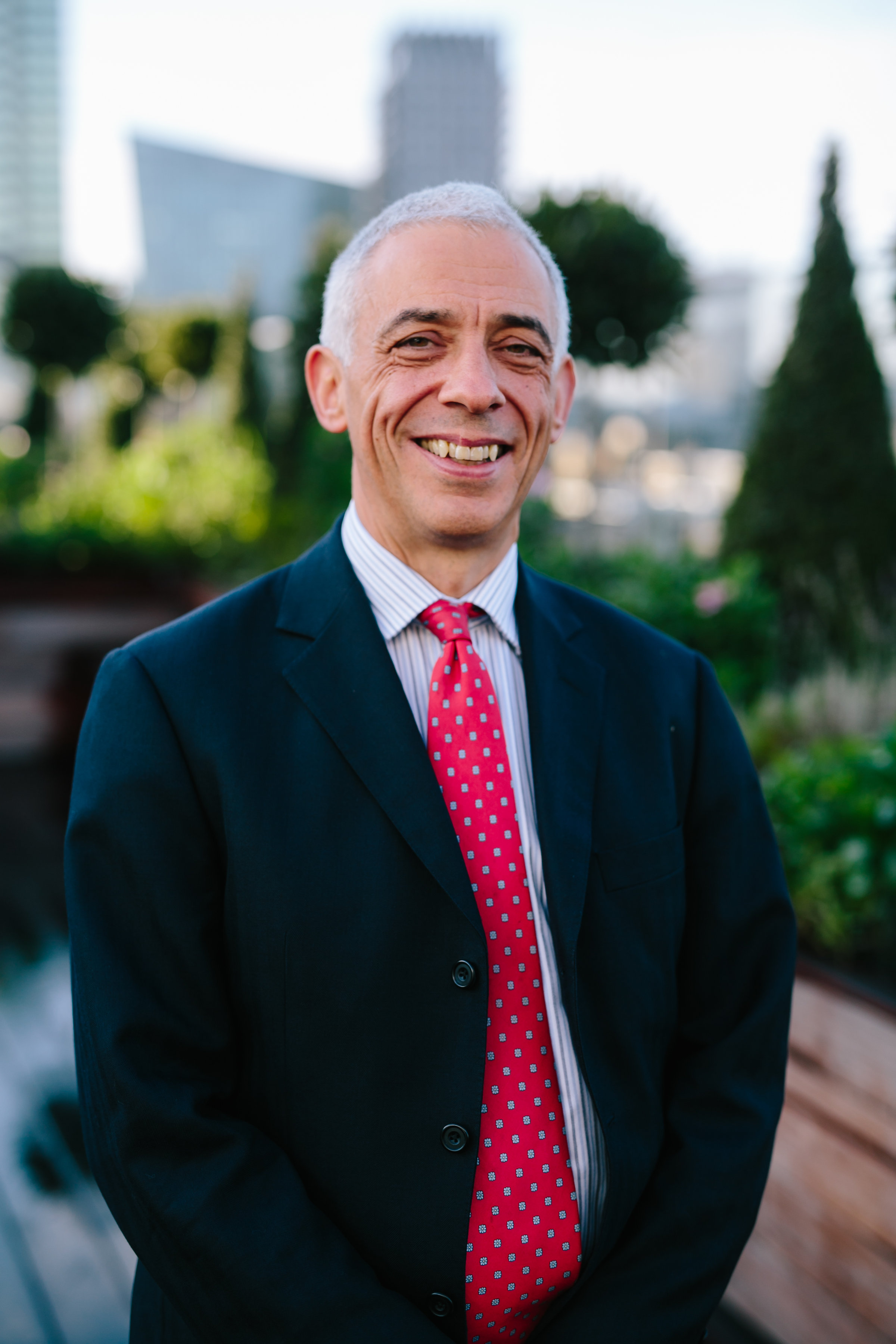
- Waksman in 2016

High Court Judge King's Bench Division
- Incumbent
- Assumed office 1 October 2018
- Monarch: Elizabeth II

Personal details
- Born: 28 August 1957 (age 69) United Kingdom
- Education: St Catherine's College, Oxford; University of Manchester

Sir David Michael Waksman (born 28 August 1957) is a British High Court judge.

Waksman was educated at Royal Grammar School in Newcastle. He completed an LLB from the University of Manchester and the BCL at St Catherine's College, Oxford.

He was called to the bar at Middle Temple in 1982 and practised from Fountain Court Chambers, specialising in commercial law. He took silk in 2002. He served as recorder from 2001 to 2007. In 2007, he left practice to become a full-time specialist senior circuit judge, which he served as until 2018. He was appointed a deputy High Court judge in 2005 and was from 2015 to 2018 judge in charge of the London Mercantile Court.

On 1 October 2018, he was appointed as a judge of the High Court and assigned to the Queen's Bench Division. He took the customary knighthood in the same year. He hears cases in the Commercial Court, the Technology and Construction Court; he is the designated judge of the Planning Court and is authorised to sit on the Competition Appeal Tribunal and the Administrative Court.
