= Richard Jacobs (judge) =

British judge

The Honourable Mr Justice Jacobs
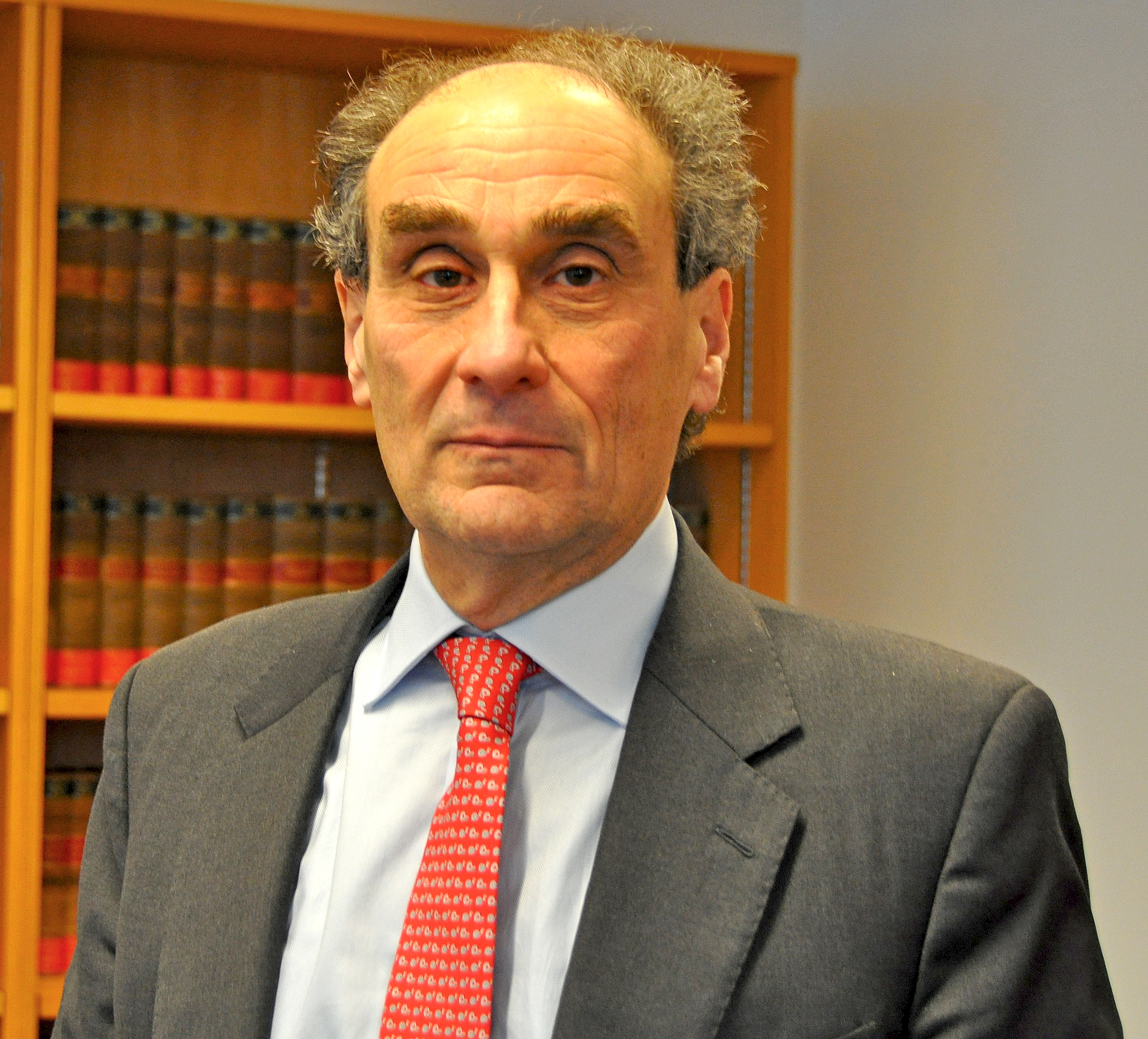
- Jacobs in 2022

High Court Judge King's Bench Division
- Incumbent
- Assumed office 25 June 2018
- Monarch: Charles III

Personal details
- Born: 21 December 1956 (age 69) United Kingdom
- Education: Pembroke College, Cambridge

Sir Richard David Jacobs (born 21 December 1956) is a British High Court judge.

== Early life and education ==
Jacobs was educated at Highgate School. He studied law at Pembroke College, Cambridge and graduated with a first-class degree.

== Career ==
He was called to the bar at Middle Temple in 1979 and practised from Essex Court Chambers, specialising in commercial law; he was co-head of chambers from 2013 to 2017. While in practice, he also sat as an arbitrator.

He took silk in 1998 and served as a recorder from 2002 to 2018. In 2003, he was visiting fellow at the London School of Economics. In addition to practice, he co-authored Liability Insurance in International Arbitration: the Bermuda form in 2004 which was taken into a second edition in 2011.

=== High Court appointment ===
On 25 June 2018, he was appointed a judge of the High Court and assigned to the Queen's Bench Division. He received the customary knighthood in the same year. Jacobs sits on the Commercial Court.

== Personal life ==
In 1990, he married Pamela Fine, with whom he has one son and two daughters.
