= Wolf & Badger =

Global Online Marketplace

Coordinates: 51°30′51.8″N 0°11′56″W

- Type: Private
- Industry: Retail
- Genre: Concept Store
- Founded: February 2010; 16 years ago
- Founders: Henry Graham; George Graham
- Headquarters: London, England
- Products: Fashion, Jewellery, Accessories
- Revenue: 29,405,274 (2021)
- Number of employees: 126 (2021)
- Website: http://www.wolfandbadger.com/

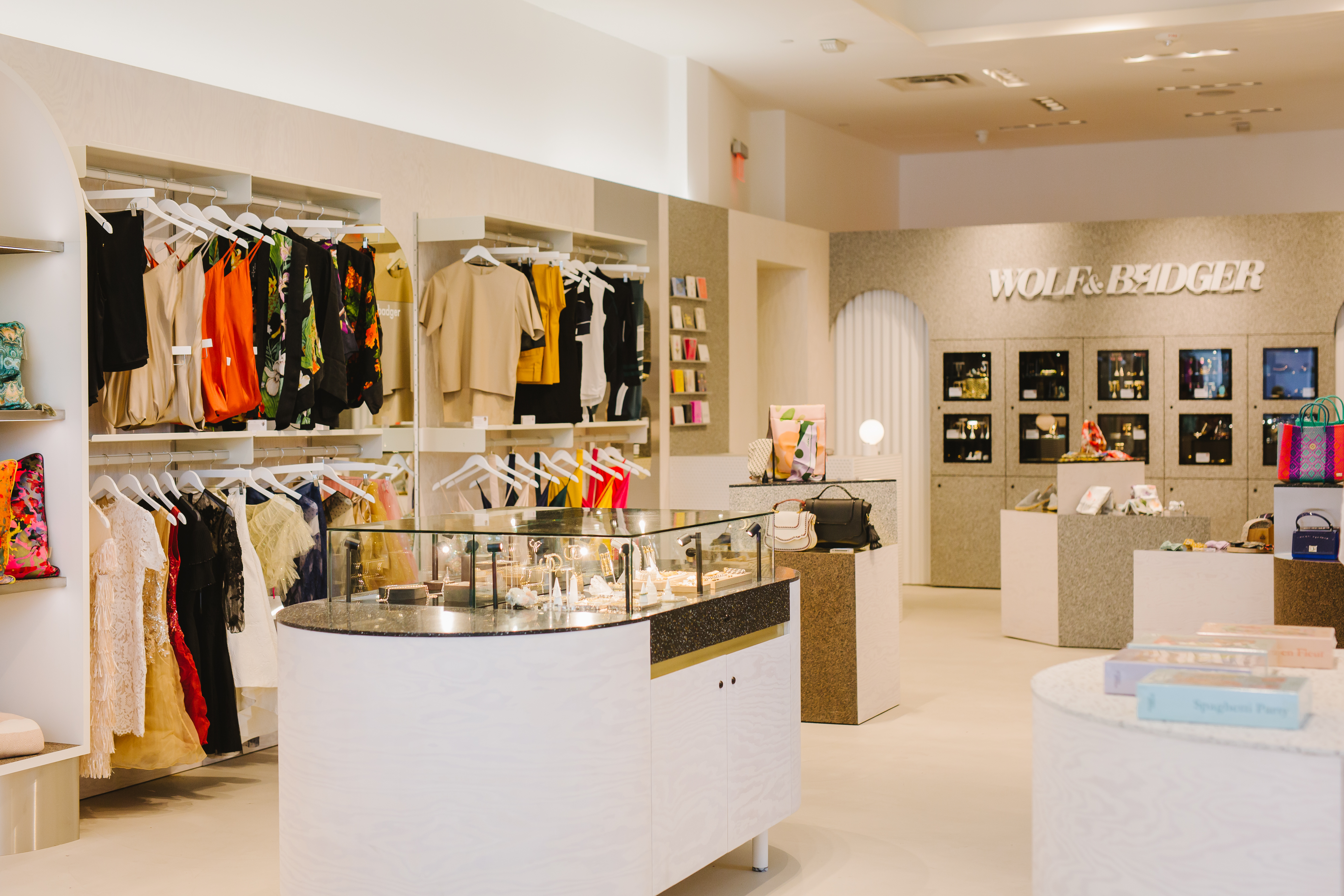
Wolf & Badger, West Hollywood

Wolf & Badger is a global online marketplace for independent fashion, beauty and homeware brands, with storefronts in London, New York City and Los Angeles.

== History ==
Wolf & Badger launched in February 2010 and was named one of Britain's Best Boutiques in the April 2010 edition of British Vogue. It was picked by Time Out as the sixth Best Shop in London.

The business was selected as one of the Walpole Brands of Tomorrow 2010 and its Co-founder - George Graham - was named the Confederation of British Industry Young Entrepreneur of the Year in 2011 for his work in setting up the concept.

Wolf & Badger continued to grow and in August 2010 opened a pop up store in Selfridges department store on Oxford Street. In 2011, it opened a summer store in Porto Montenegro. In 2012 the brand expanded further with the launch of a store on Dover Street in Mayfair. In 2014, Wolf & Badger extended its flagship store to include new juice bar Raw Press.

In 2014 the new Wolf & Badger website was named Rakuten Retail Website of the Year in the Good Web Guide Website of the Year Awards and in 2015 the business acquired Boticca to widen its reach and create a global omni-channel retail store for independent brands. Later that year, Wolf & Badger was named by Drapers as Best Multi-Channel Retailer Under £25m.

Since 2017 there has been a Wolf & Badger store in the SoHo district of New York and in 2018 Wolf & Badger announced its further expansion into a new 12,000 sqft flagship store in Kings Cross, London.

Wolf & Badger was named Sustainable Retailer Of The Year 2020 by Drapers and soon later became a Certified B Corporation.

In 2022, the business launched its first West Coast USA store on Melrose Avenue in West Hollywood, Los Angeles.

In early 2024, the London store relocated to a new location in the West End.

== Operations ==
The company is a "serviced retail" business. Spaces within its stores and online are provided to independent fashion, jewellery, beauty and homeware brands, who act as their own retailers and keep the bulk of sales revenue, as well as gain exposure to press, industry and trade buyers.
