= Henry Carr (judge) =

British judge (1958–2019)

Sir Henry Carr
- Royal coat of arms of the United Kingdom

Justice of the High Court
- In office 01 October 2015 – 18 July 2019
- Monarch: Elizabeth II

Personal details
- Born: 31 March 1958 United Kingdom
- Died: 18 July 2019 (aged 61)
- Education: Hertford College, Oxford

Sir Henry James Carr (31 March 1958 – 18 July 2019) was a British barrister and High Court judge from 2015 until his death in service four years later.

== Biography ==
Carr, whose father was a Malcolm Lester Carr, LLB of Carr, Mass Davidson. Castle Chambers, Cook Street, Liverpool and Uncle, Cyril Eric Carr, LLB former Lord Mayor of Liverpool and Leader of the city's Liberal Party solicitor, was educated at Hertford College, Oxford. When he visited Hertford for an open day, the undergraduate guide was Lord David Pannick, who would later become a leading barrister in his own right and a life peer. Carr graduated with a first-class BA in law. He later completed an LLM at the University of British Columbia.

He was called to the bar at Gray's Inn in 1982 and practised intellectual property and patents law from 11 South Square chambers. Following successful action against McDonald's, in which Sir David Neuberger ruled the company did not have a monopoly on the prefix Mc, Carr was called "McJustice" by the press. He took silk in 1998, was deputy chair of the Copyright Tribunal from 2007 to 2015 and was appointed a deputy High Court judge in 2007.

1 October 2015, he was appointed a judge of the High Court and assigned to the Chancery Division. He received the customary knighthood in the same year.

In 1988, he married Jan Dawson and together they had three sons and a daughter. He died on 18 July 2019 of pancreatic cancer. He was a supporter of Liverpool F.C. and a month before his death, he attended the 2019 Champions League Final in Madrid, in which Liverpool beat Tottenham.
