= Death of Alta Fixsler =

2021 death of a 2-year-old British Haredi girl

- Born: 23 December 2018
- Died: 18 October 2021 (aged 2)
- Cause of death: Withdrawal of life support

Alta Fixsler (23 December 2018 – 18 October 2021) was a two-year-old British girl with Haredi Jewish parents, who died after her life support was removed, following a best interests ruling that was contrary to the wishes of the child's parents.

== Birth ==
Fixsler was born on 23 December 2018, 34 weeks into the pregnancy, to Abraham and Chaya, via an emergency caesarean section, after Chaya suffered from a significant placental abruption. She was born without a heartbeat, and after successful resuscitation attempts, she remained with a severe hypoxic brain injury.

== Legal rulings ==
In 2021, a High Court judge ruled that it was not in the child's best interests for Manchester University NHS Foundation Trust to continue providing life-sustaining care. Her parents had argued that it was against their religious beliefs to allow steps to be taken that would contribute to their child's death, and asked to be allowed to transport her to Israel to continue receiving treatment. The judge rejected the parents' request, saying it would "expose Alta to further pain and discomfort during the course of transfer for no medical benefit in circumstances where all parties accept that the treatment options now available for Alta provide no prospect of recovery", although he also said "The parents cannot be criticised for having reached a different decision informed by the religious laws that govern their way of life." After the Supreme Court concurred with the judge's ruling, the parents appealed to the European Court of Human Rights, which rejected the appeal. The parents then asked to allow the child to be transported to their home and for the child's life support to be withdrawn there rather than in a hospice care facility, but this request was also denied.

== Death ==
Fixsler's life support was removed in a hospice on 18 October 2021, and she died three hours later.
