= William Trower =

British Judge

The Honourable Mr Justice Trower
- Royal coat of arms of the United Kingdom

Justice of the High Court
- Incumbent
- Assumed office 2019

Personal details
- Born: 28 December 1959 (age 66) London
- Spouse: Mary Louise Chastel de Boinville
- Education: Oxford

Sir William Spencer Philip Trower, styled Mr Justice Trower, is a British High Court judge.

== Legal career ==
Trower was born on 28 December 1959 in London, England. He completed his Graduate Diploma in Law in 1982 at City, University of London. Later completing his Master's degree at the University of Oxford in 1981.

He was called to the Bar in 1983 by Lincoln's Inn and was appointed King's Counsel in 2001.

Trower acted as a Company Director of Insolvency Lawyers Association between August 2005 and April 2018.

In 2007, he was appointed as a Deputy High Court Judge of the Chancery division until 2019.

In 2009, he became a Bencher for Lincoln's Inn.

Trower was appointed a High Court judge in 2019, assigned to the Chancery Division.

He received the customary Knight Bachelor in 2020.

== Personal life ==
He married Mary Louise Chastel De Boinville in 1986, with whom he has four daughters.

== Arms ==
Coat of arms of William Trower
Motto Aidons Nous Mutuellement
