= Ulrike Zeshan =

German linguist and sign language specialist

Ulrike Zeshan OBE is a German-born linguist and academic specializing in the linguistics of signed languages. She is Professor of Sign Language Linguistics at the University of Central Lancashire, UK.

== Biography ==
Zeshan obtained an MA at the University of Cologne in 1996 and her PhD in linguistics from the same institution in 2000. Between 1999 and 2006 she held two postdoctoral positions: first at the Research Centre for Linguistic Typology in Canberra, Australia, and then (from 2003) at the Max Planck Institute for Psycholinguistics in Nijmegen in the Netherlands. In 2006 she took up her current position as Professor at the University of Central Lancashire and Director (later Co-Director) of the International Institute for Sign Languages and Deaf Studies (iSLanDS) based at the same university.

== Honors and recognition ==
She has been an ordinary member of the Academia Europaea since 2014.

In 2015, Zeshan was appointed an honorary Officer of the Order of the British Empire (OBE) for "services to higher education and the international deaf community" as part of the 2015 Special Honours.

In 2016 she was awarded an honorary professorship at the Amity University Gurgaon in India.

== Research ==
Zeshan is a leading researcher in the field of sign language typology, and has worked on such phenomena as kinship terms, negation, possession, quantification, and questions. She has worked with UNESCO on the documentation of sign languages worldwide, including endangered sign languages. She has worked on sign languages of Ghana, India, Turkey, and Uganda. Between 2011 and 2016 she held a European Research Council grant to investigate multilingualism and multilingual behaviours of sign language users.

== Politics ==
Zeshan is also politically active, having stood as a Green Party MEP candidate in the North West England constituency in 2014, as well as in local council elections.

== Selected publications ==
- Zeshan, Ulrike. 2000. Sign Language in Indo-Pakistan: A description of a signed language. Amsterdam: John Benjamins. ISBN 902722563X
- Zeshan, Ulrike. 2003. Indo-Pakistani Sign Language Grammar: A Typological Outline. Sign Language Studies 3 (2), 157–212.
- Zeshan, Ulrike. 2003. Aspects of Türk Isaret Dili (Turkish Sign Language). Sign Language & Linguistics 6 (1), 43–75.
- Zeshan, Ulrike. 2004. Interrogative Constructions in Signed Languages: Crosslinguistic Perspectives. Language 80 (1), 7–39.
- Zeshan, Ulrike. 2004. Hand, head and face: negative constructions in sign languages. Linguistic Typology 8, 1–58.
- Zeshan, Ulrike (ed.). 2006. Interrogative and Negative Constructions in Sign Language. Ishara Press.
- Zeshan, Ulrike, and Connie De Vos (eds.). 2012. Sign languages in village communities: Anthropological and linguistic insights. Berlin: De Gruyter. ISBN 9781614511496
