= Andrew Gilbart =

Sir Andrew Gilbart
- Royal coat of arms of the United Kingdom

Justice of the High Court
- In office 2014–2018

Personal details
- Born: 13 February 1950
- Died: 19 March 2018 (aged 68)
- Education: Trinity Hall, Cambridge
- Profession: Jurist

Sir Andrew James Gilbart (13 February 1950 – 19 March 2018), styled The Hon. Mr Justice Gilbart, was a judge of the High Court of England and Wales until his death in service.

== Biography ==
He was educated at Westminster School and Trinity Hall, Cambridge.

He was called to the bar by Middle Temple in 1972 and became a bencher there in 2000. He was made a QC in 1991, a circuit judge in 2004, a senior circuit judge and Honorary Recorder of Manchester in 2008, a deputy judge of the High Court from 2004 to 2013, and an announcement of his appointment as a judge of the High Court of Justice allocated to the Queen's Bench Division was made in 2013. Illness prevented him taking up his appointment until October 2014. He was made a knight bachelor on 3 November 2015.

A planning law specialist at the Bar, he was heavily involved in the long-running Manchester Runway litigation. During his tenure as Recorder of Manchester he presided over many criminal cases, including sentencing in cases arising from Manchester riots, in respect of which he purported to set local sentencing guidelines which were later overturned by the Court of Appeal.
