= Kevin Haberfield =

Royal Marine

- Born: July 1957 (age 69); Weston-super-Mare, Somerset, England
- Military career
- Allegiance: United Kingdom
- Branch: Royal Marines
- Service years: 1980–2012
- Rank: Colour Sergeant
- Service number: P040074J
- Unit: Special Boat Service
- Conflicts: War in Afghanistan
- Awards: George Cross

Kevin Howard Haberfield, GC (born July 1957) is a British former Royal Marine who was awarded the George Cross (GC), the highest decoration for gallantry not in the face of the enemy, in 2015. The award was backdated to the date of the action in Afghanistan on 22 November 2005. The only details released were that the award was made "for Services in the Field".

Haberfield served in the Royal Marines from January 1980 to January 2012. He had also served with the Special Boat Service (SBS).
