= Edward Pepperall =

British judge

The Honourable Mr Justice Pepperall
- Royal coat of arms of the United Kingdom

High Court Judge King's Bench Division
- Incumbent
- Assumed office 1 October 2018
- Monarchs: Elizabeth II; Charles III

Personal details
- Born: 27 December 1966 (age 59) Bristol, England
- Education: University of Birmingham

Sir Edward Brian Pepperall (born 27 December 1966) is a British High Court judge.

Pepperall was born in Bristol, England and educated at Queen Elizabeth's Hospital in Bristol. His grandfather was former Conservative MP Harold Gurden. He completed an LLB at the University of Birmingham in 1988 and attended the Inns of Court School of Law thereafter.

He was called to the bar at Lincoln's Inn in 1989 and practised commercial and employment law, initially from 2 Fountain Court Chambers in Birmingham and then St Philips Chambers located in Birmingham and London, where he was deputy head of chambers from 2014 to 2017. He served as a recorder from 2009 to 2018 and took silk in 2013. He was appointed a deputy High Court judge in 2016. In addition to practice, he contributed to the White Book from 2015. Since 2017, he has been a judge on the Falkland Islands and Other Territories Court of Appeal.

On 1 October 2018, Pepperall was appointed a judge of the High Court and assigned to the Queen's Bench Division. He took the customary knighthood in the same year. He sits on the Technology and Construction Court. Since 2020, he has been Presiding Judge of the Midland Circuit.

== Personal life ==
In 2003, Pepperall married Sarah Fardell, with whom he has a son and two daughters.

== Court Decisions ==
In 2019, Pepperall was the judge who decided the challenge by Chris Williamson MP to his second suspension by the Labour Party. Unusually, he found that Labour had "acted unfairly in that there was no proper reason for reopening the case against Mr Williamson"; but he also refused to quash the suspension, as “there is nothing in the new allegations, the timing of the letter of 3 September, or the decision to suspend, that entitles me to take the view upon the papers that the Labour party is acting either unfairly or other than in good faith". Both sides then claimed to have won, but the BBC reported that Williamson had lost.

Passing judgment in a case that caused national debate and protests, in June 2023 Pepperall sentenced Carla Foster, a mother of three, to a 28 month prison term for inducing an abortion in a gestational range the coroner estimated at 32 to 34 weeks of pregnancy. The ceiling for legal abortion in England and Wales is 24 weeks and after 10 weeks such a procedure must be carried out in a clinic. Convicting Foster under the Offences Against the Person Act 1861, Pepperall ruled that half of the defendant's sentence should be spent in custody, stating that the sentence would likely have been suspended had she pleaded guilty earlier Foster had three other young children, including one with special needs. Pepperall also acknowledged that Foster suffered from depression. Stella Creasy MP called for urgent reform of the law, saying, "The average prison sentence for a violent offence in England is 18 months. A woman who had an abortion without following correct procedures just got 28 months under an 1868 act - we need urgent reform to make safe access for all women in England, Scotland and Wales a human right."
