= Pushpinder Saini =

British judge

The Honourable Mr Justice Saini
- Royal coat of arms of the United Kingdom

Justice of the High Court
- Incumbent
- Assumed office 12 June 2026
- Monarchs: Charles III; Elizabeth II

Personal details
- Born: 26 February 1968 (age 58) Nairobi, Kenya
- Education: Corpus Christi College, Oxford

Sir Pushpinder Singh Saini (born 26 February 1968) is a British High Court judge.

Saini was born in Nairobi, Kenya and educated at Dormers Wells High School in Southall and attended Corpus Christi College, Oxford, completing a BA and the postgraduate BCL, graduating with a first in both.

He was called to the bar at Gray's Inn in 1991 and practised from Blackstone Chambers. He took silk in 2008 and was appointed a deputy High Court judge in 2017.

On 1 October 2019, Saini was appointed a judge of the High Court and assigned to the Queen's Bench Division. He took the customary knighthood in the same year. He is the Senior Presiding Judge on the Western Circuit. On 12 June 2026, it was announced that Lord Justice Saini was to be appointed a judge of the Court of Appeal.
