= Sally Mulready =

Sally Mulready is a British Irish activist and former member of the Irish Council of State. She was one of seven appointees appointed to the Council of State in January 2012 by President Michael D. Higgins. Mulready was the only President's nominee on the Council of State who did not live in Ireland. She was appointed by the President due to her many decades of work for the Irish community in Britain. The Irish Times of 21 January 2012 published an article about Mulready headlined "The President's emigrant". Sally Mulready's work spans many decades and many areas. The theme that runs through all her work is helping and empowering the disadvantaged.

== Survivors ==
Mulready is a founder member of the Irish Women Survivors Network, known widely as "the Women's Group".'Survivors' is the term given to the men and women who spent time in Irish institutional care under the religious orders.

=== The Women's Group ===
Sally Mulready founded the Irish Women Survivors Network in London in 2002 after watching the ground-breaking States of Fear programme by the late Mary Raftery. The group was founded in order to provide support, advice and companionship to women who had spent time in Irish institutional care, either as children or as mothers (in 'mother and baby' homes.) Over the last ten years, the group has grown in terms of numbers of women involved (often with 400 people attending meetings), scope, and reach (regularly contributing to government policy discussions through attendance of meetings with Ministers and formal submissions.)

=== Policy contribution ===
Mulready gave evidence to the Commission to Inquire into Child Abuse and has recently given evidence to the Irish Government's interdepartmental inquiry into the possibility of state involvement in the Magdalene Laundries. The inquiry was established by Minister Alan Shatter and is being chaired by Senator Martin McAleese. Mulready has gathered extensive evidence from individual Magdalene women, which has been acknowledged as of great importance to the work of the inquiry. In 2011 and after a long fight for justice, the women received an official apology from the Irish government in a speech made by Ireland's Taoiseach Enda Kenny, who met 15 from the Magdalene survivors and ordered the judicial commission to create compensation packages for the affected women.

=== Survivors' welfare ===
Sally Mulready and the other Trustees of the Irish Women's Survivors Network later founded the Irish Survivors Support and Advice Network, providing help to survivors relating to accessing the Residential Institutions Redress Board, tracing family members, counselling, benefits and other welfare needs. This is a survivors-led organisation, with all Trustees being survivors and the head of the service (voluntary basis), Phyllis Morgan, is also a survivor. A book documenting the personal and contextual history of the Irish Women Survivors Network is currently being written and will be available in 2012.

In her former capacity as the Secretary of the Federation of Irish Societies, Mulready secured the Irish Government’s agreement for the creation and funding of five Survivor Outreach Services in Britain, at a time when no such services existed. The aim was to meet the urgent needs of the thousands of men and women who fled Ireland hurt and alone following terrible experiences and ordeals.

== Work with older Irish people ==
Sally Mulready was the Director and first member of staff of the Irish Elderly Advice Network, a charity supporting older Irish people living in and around London. The aim of the charity is to combat poverty and isolation amongst older Irish people. The Irish Elderly Advice Network was founded in 1993 by Bridie McGowan and Margaret Byrne, both older Irish people, after three vulnerable older Irish people were found dead in their homes in Camden. Sally was the first member of staff.

Mulready campaigned, successfully, for recognition of the right of Irish pensioners to an Irish contributory pension based on their national insurance contributions made before they left Ireland; something that continues to have a transforming impact on people’s lives.

The charity remains small in staff numbers but big in reach. To date, it has helped combat the poverty and isolation of over 4000 older Irish people and is highly regarded by the Ireland Fund of Great Britain, the Irish Embassy and the Irish community in London. In formal recognition of her work in this area, Mulready was awarded the Irish Post newspaper’s Outstanding Community Services Award for her ‘work with elderly Irish people’.

In 2005 Mulready created the London Irish Pensioners Choir and she directed their recording of Songs of Love and Emigration

One of her daughters, Nora, also works with her at the Irish Elderly Advice Network.

== Birmingham Six Campaign ==
Having watched the Granada TV World In Action programme on the case of the Birmingham six, Sally was convinced of the innocence of the six men and worked with a handful of other workers, mostly from Islington Council in London, to arrange the first meeting of the London campaign; it took place in a small room in the Red Rose Club in Islington in 1986, where Sally was elected as the Secretary of the campaign. This became the London Birmingham Six campaign and it complimented the campaigning work being done by the wives of the men in Birmingham, a campaign group in Dublin and numerous other individuals who were making representations to their MPs on behalf of the Birmingham Six. Jeremy Corbyn MP and Chris Mullin MP were pivotal to raising the campaign in Westminster. The Birmingham Six campaign grew into an international campaign against injustice and the eventual release of the men in March 1991. When the men were finally released Sally wrote Cruel Fate with Hugh Callaghan, the oldest of the Birmingham Six. Sally continued to support the men following their release by campaigning for a legislative change to Pensions entitlements enabling them, and all subsequent victims of miscarriages of justice, to access full State Pensions.

== Labour Party work ==
Sally has been a member of the British Labour Party since 1980. Sally Mulready is also an elected Labour Party Councillor in Chatham Ward in the London Borough of Hackney. She was first elected to this position in 1997. Sally Mulready was the Speaker of Hackney from 2010 to 2011.

== Honours ==
- Honorary Officer of the Order of the British Empire, 2019

== Family ==
Mulready is married and has four children and ten grandchildren. Her husband is Seamus Mulready. Her four children are called Molly, Nora, Ned, and Seamus.

Her daughter, Molly Mulready, worked as a lawyer for the UK Foreign Office between 2014 and 2019, where she became a whistleblower regarding British arms sales to Saudi Arabia and their use during the Yemeni Civil War.
