= Petr Torák =

British police officer

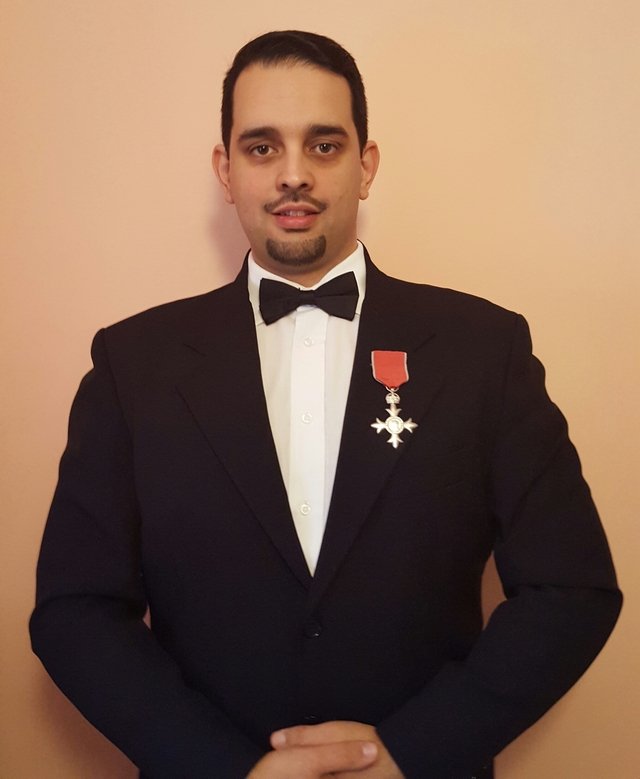
Petr Torák with Order of the British Empire

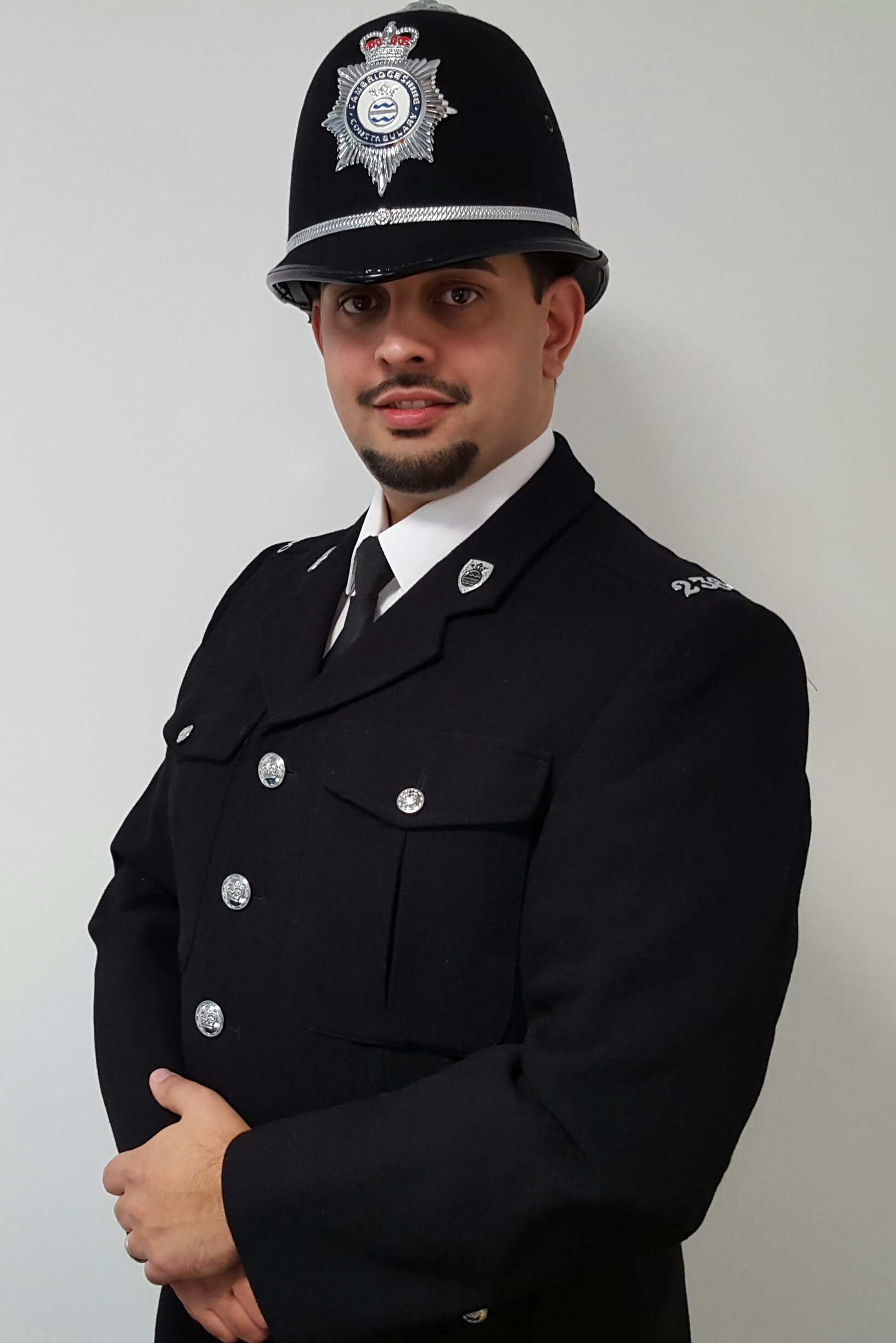
Petr Torák as a police officer

Petr Torák MBE (born 8 March 1981) is a Czech-British honorary consul of the Czech Republic in the United Kingdom and a former police officer. He is of Roma origin. His police work was centred on Czech and Slovak Roma people, the issues they face, and wider questions arising from their migration to England. In 2015, Torák was appointed MBE for "services to the Roma community".

== Early life and career ==
Torák was born in Liberec in Czechoslovakia and studied at the Law Academy. In 1999, he and his parents sought asylum in the UK, after suffering violent attacks with political and racist motives. Torák initially worked as a volunteer in a solicitor's office in Southend-on-Sea.

== Police work ==
Torák worked in Peterborough, a city with many recent east and central European immigrants, and his language skills (Czech, Polish, Slovak, Portuguese, English and some Russian) and cultural understanding have been commented on favourably. He is a project co-ordinator in a local organisation, COMPAS, which tries to promote community cohesion and is also a trained mediator for ROMED, an EU project which trains mediators to help Roma communities communicate with local authorities.

Torák has been called on to consult with groups concerned about "modern slavery" and similar issues affecting migrants from Eastern Europe, like young women forced into sex work, and workers exploited by gangmasters. He has also been invited to participate in a meeting of the Organization for Security and Co-operation in Europe (OSCE) about Roma and Sinti "interactions with law enforcement agencies". Answering questions, he said he was "initially regarded as a "Roma police officer", but now works with all members of the community, setting an example of how the Roma community can play a role in mainstream society."

Torák is actively involved with the Gypsy Roma Traveller Police Association (GRTPA) which offers a network of support for Traveller and Romany police officers who often hide their ancestry for fear of prejudice. He is currently the Executive Director of the Association. He encouraged Roma people in the UK to consider policing as a possible career choice.

In 2015, he was given an honorary MBE (an MBE for non-Commonwealth citizens) for "services to the Roma community". In August 2019, the award was made Substantive.
