= Simon Picken =

British judge

The Honourable Mr Justice Picken
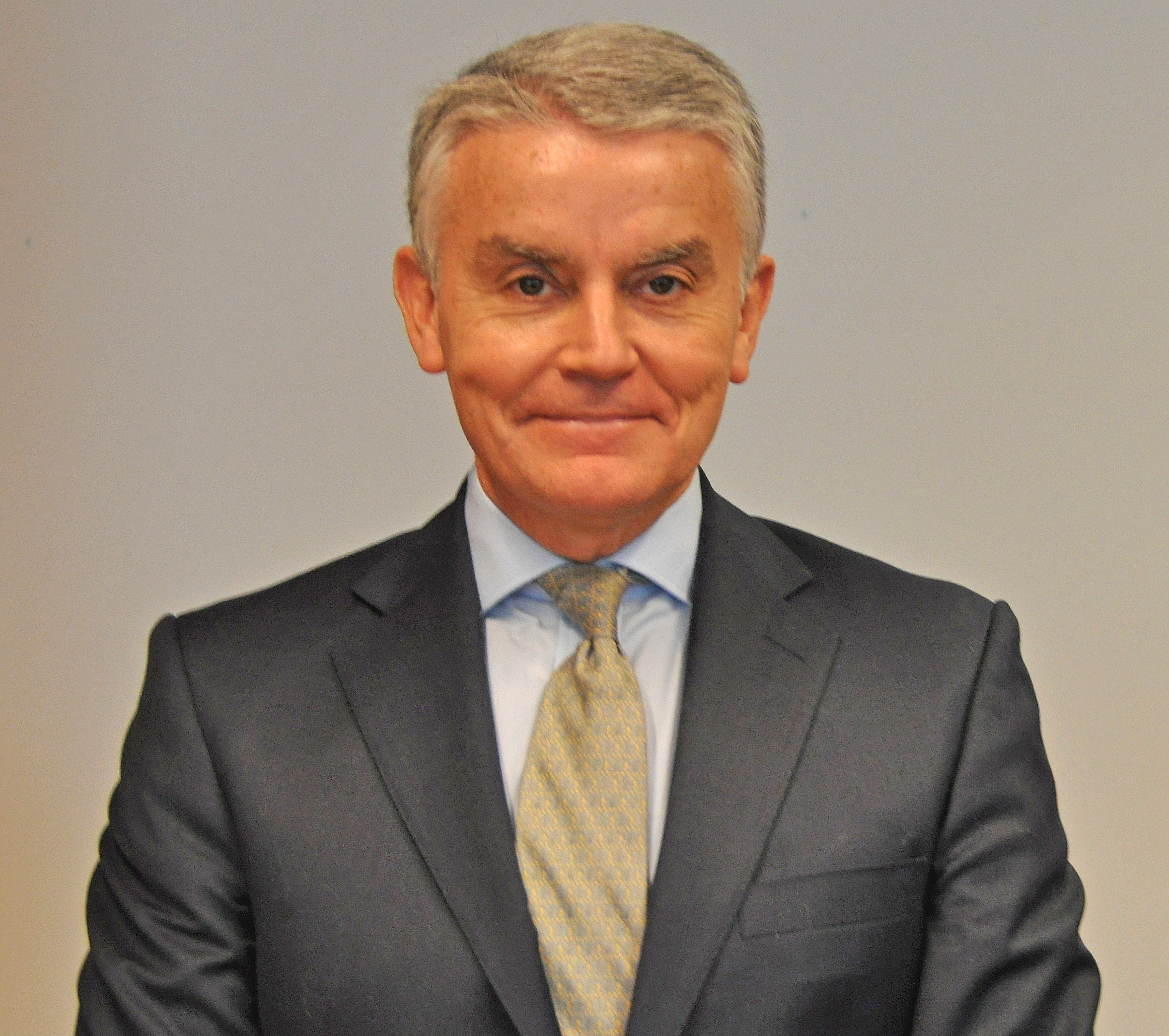
- Picken in 2022

Justice of the High Court
- Incumbent
- Assumed office 8 June 2015
- Monarch: Elizabeth II

Personal details
- Born: 23 April 1966 (age 60) United Kingdom
- Education: Magdalene College, Cambridge; University College, Cardiff

Sir Simon Picken (born 23 April 1966) is a British High Court judge.

Picken was educated at Cardiff High School, then completed an LLB at University College, Cardiff in 1987 and a starred first-class LLM from Magdalene College, Cambridge in 1988.

He was called to the bar at the Middle Temple in 1989, then established a practice at the bar in the area of commercial law, practising from 7 King's Bench Walk chambers from 1991. He took silk in 2006, served as a recorder in 2005 to 2015, a Deputy High Court judge from 2010. From 2009 to 2015, he was the Commercial Law QC to the Welsh Government. In addition to practice, he wrote Good Faith and Insurance Contracts which was taken into a fourth edition.

He was appointed a High Court judge in 2015, and received the customary knighthood. He has been a judge of the Commercial Court since 2016, is on the Financial List and is lead judge for European relations. From 2018 to 2021, he was the Presiding Judge of Wales.

In April 2022, he presided over Microsoft's £270 million competition case in which Microsoft encouraged customers to return unused licences in turn for a discount on Microsoft products; a Derbyshire-based company who bought and sold unused these licences said this stifled competition and was a violation of competition law.

He married Sophie Victoria Seddon in 1992, with whom he has one son and three daughters.
