= Grade I listed buildings in the City of London =

There are over 9,000 Grade I listed buildings in England. This page is a list of these buildings in the City of London.

== Buildings ==
=== Churches ===
Name	Location	Type	Completed (Note: The date given is the date used by Historic England as significant for the initial building or that of an important part in the structure's description.)	Date designated	Grid ref. (Note: The grid reference is based on the British national grid reference system, sometimes known as OSGB36, used by the Ordnance Survey.) Geo-coordinates	Entry number (Note: The "List Entry Number" is a unique number assigned to each listed building and scheduled monument by Historic England.)	Image
St Paul's Cathedral	Castle Baynard	Cathedral	The previous building Medieval. The present building 1711	4 January 1950	TQ3204281141; 51°30′50″N 0°05′55″W	1079157	St Paul's Cathedral More images
Christ Church Greyfriars	Farringdon Within	Church	1677–91	4 January 1950	TQ3198181372; 51°30′57″N 0°05′58″W	1359217	Christ Church Greyfriars More images
Church of All Hallows-on-the-Wall	Broad Street	Church	1765-7	4 January 1950	TQ3302281485; 51°31′00″N 0°05′03″W	1064632	Church of All Hallows-on-the-Wall More images
Church of All Hallows by the Tower	Tower	Church	15th century	4 January 1950	TQ3338580687; 51°30′34″N 0°04′46″W	1064671	Church of All Hallows by the Tower More images
Church of St Andrew	Farringdon Without	Church	15th century	4 January 1950	TQ3147081518; 51°31′02″N 0°06′24″W	1064643	Church of St Andrew More images
Church of St Andrew by the Wardrobe	Castle Baynard	Church	1685–95	4 January 1950	TQ3185580980; 51°30′45″N 0°06′05″W	1079148	Church of St Andrew by the Wardrobe More images
Church of St Andrew Undershaft	Aldgate	Church	15th century	4 January 1950	TQ3325281173; 51°30′50″N 0°04′52″W	1079155	Church of St Andrew Undershaft More images
Church of St Anne and St Agnes	Aldersgate	Church	Medieval	4 January 1950	TQ3218781449; 51°30′59″N 0°05′47″W	1286384	Church of St Anne and St Agnes More images
Church of St Bartholomew the Great	Farringdon Within	Church	12th century	4 January 1950	TQ3195681711; 51°31′08″N 0°05′58″W	1180873	Church of St Bartholomew the Great More images
Church of St Benet, Paul's Wharf	Queenhithe	Church	1677–85	4 January 1950	TQ3200080907; 51°30′42″N 0°05′57″W	1180700	Church of St Benet, Paul's Wharf More images
Church of St Botolph	Aldersgate	Church	Medieval	4 January 1950	TQ3212381501; 51°31′01″N 0°05′50″W	1064732	Church of St Botolph More images
Church of St Botolph	Portsoken	Church	1741-4	4 January 1950	TQ3357581215; 51°30′51″N 0°04′35″W	1359143	Church of St Botolph More images
Church of St Bride	City and County of the City of London	Church	1670–1684	4 January 1950	TQ3155681128; 51°30′50″N 0°06′20″W	1064657	Church of St Bride More images
Church of St Clement	City and County of the City of London	Church	1683-7	4 January 1950	TQ3286480895; 51°30′41″N 0°05′12″W	1064699	Church of St Clement More images
Church of St Dunstan in the East	City and County of the City of London	Gate	1698	4 January 1950	TQ3314980718; 51°30′35″N 0°04′58″W	1359173	Church of St Dunstan in the East More images
Church of St Dunstan-in-the-West (including attached Sunday School)	City and County of the City of London	Statue	1586	4 January 1950	TQ3122981172; 51°30′51″N 0°06′37″W	1064663	Church of St Dunstan-in-the-West (including attached Sunday School) More images
Church of St Edmund	City and County of the City of London	Church	1670-9	4 January 1950	TQ3289581020; 51°30′45″N 0°05′11″W	1064631	Church of St Edmund More images
Church of St Giles	City and County of the City of London	Church	Mid 16th century	4 January 1950	TQ3235181699; 51°31′07″N 0°05′38″W	1359183	Church of St Giles More images
Church of St Helen	City and County of the City of London	Church	13th century	4 January 1950	TQ3320481285; 51°30′53″N 0°04′54″W	1286458	Church of St Helen More images
Church of St James Garlickhithe	City and County of the City of London	Church	1674–87	4 January 1950	TQ3238480854; 51°30′40″N 0°05′37″W	1064669	Church of St James Garlickhithe More images
Church of St Katherine Cree	City and County of the City of London	Church	Late 18th – Early 19th century	4 January 1950	TQ3339781140; 51°30′48″N 0°04′44″W	1064627	Church of St Katherine Cree More images
Church of St Lawrence Jewry	City and County of the City of London	Church	1670–86	4 January 1950	TQ3245881325; 51°30′55″N 0°05′33″W	1064673	Church of St Lawrence Jewry More images
Church of St Magnus the Martyr	City and County of the City of London	Church	1671–87	4 January 1950	TQ3291080671; 51°30′34″N 0°05′10″W	1064601	Church of St Magnus the Martyr More images
Church of St Margaret	City and County of the City of London	Church	1686–95	4 January 1950	TQ3271281280; 51°30′54″N 0°05′20″W	1064634	Church of St Margaret More images
Church of St Margaret Pattens	City and County of the City of London	Church	1684-9	4 January 1950	TQ3313080840; 51°30′39″N 0°04′59″W	1286593	Church of St Margaret Pattens More images
Church of St Martin	City and County of the City of London	Church	1677–87	4 January 1950	TQ3180281172; 51°30′51″N 0°06′07″W	1359194	Church of St Martin More images
Church of St Mary	City and County of the City of London	Church	1681–87	4 January 1950	TQ3275580927; 51°30′42″N 0°05′18″W	1359119	Church of St Mary More images
Church of St Mary-at-Hill	City and County of the City of London	Church	1670-6	4 January 1950	TQ3308080760; 51°30′36″N 0°05′01″W	1064600	Church of St Mary-at-Hill More images
Church of St Mary Aldermary	City and County of the City of London	Church	Early 16th century	4 January 1950	TQ3240981035; 51°30′46″N 0°05′36″W	1079145	Church of St Mary Aldermary More images
Church of St Mary Le Bow	City and County of the City of London	Church	1670–1683	4 January 1950	TQ3238681143; 51°30′49″N 0°05′37″W	1064696	Church of St Mary Le Bow More images
Church of St Mary Woolnoth	City and County of the City of London	Church	1716–27	4 January 1950	TQ3277181047; 51°30′46″N 0°05′17″W	1064620	Church of St Mary Woolnoth More images
Church of St Michael	City and County of the City of London	Church	1670-7	4 January 1950	TQ3295181101; 51°30′48″N 0°05′08″W	1286688	Church of St Michael More images
Church of St Michael Paternoster Royal	City and County of the City of London	Church	1686–94	4 January 1950	TQ3249380866; 51°30′40″N 0°05′32″W	1286707	Church of St Michael Paternoster Royal More images
Church of St Nicholas Cole Abbey	Bread Street	Church	1671–81	4 January 1950	TQ3216180959; 51°30′44″N 0°05′49″W	1079146	Church of St Nicholas Cole Abbey More images
Church of St Olave	Tower	Church	Late 13th century	4 January 1950	TQ3337280859; 51°30′39″N 0°04′46″W	1064676	Church of St Olave More images
Church of St Peter	Cornhill	Church	Medieval	4 January 1950	TQ3301081108; 51°30′48″N 0°05′05″W	1192245	Church of St Peter More images
Church of St Sepulchre	Farringdon Without	Church	Mid 15th century	4 January 1950	TQ3177581459; 51°31′00″N 0°06′08″W	1064640	Church of St Sepulchre More images
Church of St Stephen	Walbrook	Church	1672–87	4 January 1950	TQ3264681030; 51°30′45″N 0°05′24″W	1285320	Church of St Stephen More images
Church of St Vedast	City and County of the City of London	Church	1670-3	4 January 1950	TQ3220281272; 51°30′54″N 0°05′46″W	1064666	Church of St Vedast More images
Guild Church of St Ethelburga the Virgin	City and County of the City of London	Fountain	1923	4 January 1950	TQ3318581361; 51°30′56″N 0°04′55″W	1191603	Guild Church of St Ethelburga the Virgin More images
Temple Church (St Mary's)	Inner Temple, City and County of the City of London	Church	1185	4 January 1950	TQ3123581062; 51°30′48″N 0°06′37″W	1064646	Temple Church (St Mary's) More images
Tower and Remains of Church of All Hallows Staining	City and County of the City of London	Tower	12th century OR 13th century	4 January 1950	TQ3330180934; 51°30′42″N 0°04′50″W	1064605	Tower and Remains of Church of All Hallows Staining More images
Tower of Former Church of St Augustine	City and County of the City of London	Tower	1680-4	4 January 1950	TQ3215081110; 51°30′48″N 0°05′49″W	1079121	Tower of Former Church of St Augustine More images
Tower of Former Church of St Mary Somerset	City and County of the City of London	Tower	1686–94	4 January 1950	TQ3216380880; 51°30′41″N 0°05′49″W	1358904	Tower of Former Church of St Mary Somerset More images
Tower of Former Church of St Olave	City and County of the City of London	Church	1670-9	4 January 1950	TQ3253081228; 51°30′52″N 0°05′29″W	1359180	Tower of Former Church of St Olave More images

=== Livery company halls ===
Name	Location	Type	Completed	Date designated	Grid ref. Geo-coordinates	Entry number	Image
Apothecaries' Hall	Farringdon Within	Livery Hall	1670	4 January 1950	TQ3171981037; 51°30′46″N 0°06′12″W	1359133	Apothecaries' Hall More images
Goldsmiths' Hall	City and County of the City of London	Livery Hall	1829–35	4 January 1950	TQ3221981357; 51°30′56″N 0°05′45″W	1286469	Goldsmiths' Hall More images
Skinners' Hall	City and County of the City of London	Livery Hall	Late 17th century	4 January 1950	TQ3255880861; 51°30′40″N 0°05′28″W	1064686	Skinners' Hall More images
Stationers' Hall	City and County of the City of London	Livery Hall	c. 1670	4 January 1950	TQ3183181201; 51°30′52″N 0°06′06″W	1064742	Stationers' Hall More images
Vintners' Hall	City and County of the City of London	Livery Hall	1840	4 January 1950	TQ3239380809; 51°30′39″N 0°05′37″W	1180690	Vintners' Hall More images

=== Other ===
Name	Location	Type	Completed	Date designated	Grid ref. Geo-coordinates	Entry number	Image
Bank of England	Walbrook	Bank	Late 18th century to early 19th century	4 January 1950	TQ3273081211; 51°30′51″N 0°05′19″W	1079134	Bank of England More images
College of Arms	City and County of the City of London	House and gate	1956	4 January 1950	TQ3203380971; 51°30′44″N 0°05′55″W	1079147	College of Arms More images
Custom House	City and County of the City of London	Custom House	1813–17	5 June 1972	TQ3317280611; 51°30′31″N 0°04′57″W	1359193	Custom House More images
Dr. Johnson's House	City and County of the City of London	House	Late 17th century	4 January 1950	TQ3136781267; 51°30′54″N 0°06′30″W	1192738	Dr. Johnson's House More images
Guildhall	City and County of the City of London	Guildhall	Early 15th century	4 January 1950	TQ3248581384; 51°30′57″N 0°05′31″W	1064675	Guildhall More images
Lloyd's Building	City and County of the City of London	Commercial Office	1978–86	19 December 2011	TQ3315981082; 51°30′47″N 0°04′57″W	1405493	Lloyd's Building More images
St Bartholomew's Hospital Main North Block, East Block and West Block	City and County of the City of London	Courtyard	1750-9	4 January 1950	TQ3189281574; 51°31′04″N 0°06′02″W	1079116	St Bartholomew's Hospital Main North Block, East Block and West Block More images
Mansion House	City and County of the City of London	Courtyard	1739–53	4 January 1950	TQ3266981070; 51°30′47″N 0°05′22″W	1064604	Mansion House More images
Midland Bank, Poultry	City and County of the City of London	Commercial Office	1924	5 June 1972	TQ3262281144; 51°30′49″N 0°05′25″W	1064598	Midland Bank, Poultry More images
Churchyard railings at St Paul's Cathedral	City and County of the City of London	Gate	1714	5 June 1972	TQ3197881099; 51°30′48″N 0°05′58″W	1194622	Churchyard railings at St Paul's Cathedral More images
Royal Exchange	City and County of the City of London	Exchange	1841-4	4 January 1950	TQ3282581144; 51°30′49″N 0°05′14″W	1064713	Royal Exchange More images
St Paul's Cathedral Deanery	City and County of the City of London	Deanery	1670	4 January 1950	TQ3190081082; 51°30′48″N 0°06′02″W	1064683	St Paul's Cathedral Deanery More images
St Paul's Deanery Screen wall and gateways	City and County of the City of London	Gate		5 June 1972	TQ3192181080; 51°30′48″N 0°06′01″W	1359191	St Paul's Deanery Screen wall and gateways
Bevis Marks Synagogue	City and County of the City of London	Synagogue	1701	4 January 1950	TQ3339581257; 51°30′52″N 0°04′44″W	1064745	Bevis Marks Synagogue More images
Temple Bar Gate	City and County of the City of London	Gate	1806	15 June 2010	TQ3196981195; 51°30′51″N 0°05′58″W	1393844	Temple Bar Gate More images
St Bartholomew's Hospital Gatehouse	City and County of the City of London	Gate	1702	4 January 1950	TQ3186381599; 51°31′05″N 0°06′03″W	1079115	St Bartholomew's Hospital Gatehouse More images
The Monument	City and County of the City of London	Column	1671-7	4 January 1950	TQ3292380760; 51°30′37″N 0°05′10″W	1193901	The Monument More images
Trinity House	City and County of the City of London	House	1793-6	4 January 1950	TQ3352280803; 51°30′37″N 0°04′38″W	1079137	Trinity House More images
Westminster Bank	City and County of the City of London	Bank (financial)	1865	4 January 1950	TQ3307081267; 51°30′53″N 0°05′01″W	1191569	Westminster Bank More images
1 Essex Court	Middle Temple, City and County of the City of London	Inns of Court	1685	4 January 1950	TQ3112581000; 51°30′46″N 0°06′42″W	1286024	1 Essex Court More images
2 & 3 Essex Court	Middle Temple, City and County of the City of London	Inns of Court	1677	4 January 1950	TQ3110481011; 51°30′46″N 0°06′43″W	1359199	2 & 3 Essex Court More images
1 Hare Court	Inner Temple, City and County of the City of London	Inns of Court	Late 17th century	4 January 1950	TQ3119381038; 51°30′47″N 0°06′39″W	1359200	1 Hare Court More images
1 Kings Bench Walk	Inner Temple, City and County of the City of London	Inns of Court	Late 17th century	4 January 1950	TQ3131581071; 51°30′48″N 0°06′32″W	1064647	1 Kings Bench Walk More images
2 King's Bench Walk	Inner Temple, City and County of the City of London	Inns of Court	Late 17th century	4 January 1950	TQ3131681056; 51°30′47″N 0°06′32″W	1193156	2 King's Bench Walk More images
3 Kings Bench Walk	Inner Temple, City and County of the City of London	Inns of Court	Late 17th century	4 January 1950	TQ3134681045; 51°30′47″N 0°06′31″W	1064648	3 Kings Bench Walk More images
4 King's Bench Walk	Inner Temple, City and County of the City of London	Inns of Court	Late 17th century	4 January 1950	TQ3134681033; 51°30′47″N 0°06′31″W	1193173	4 King's Bench Walk More images
5 Kings Bench Walk	Inner Temple, City and County of the City of London	Inns of Court	Late 17th century	4 January 1950	TQ3134781014; 51°30′46″N 0°06′31″W	1359177	5 Kings Bench Walk More images
6 Kings Bench Walk	Inner Temple, City and County of the City of London	Inns of Court	Late 17th century	4 January 1950	TQ3134880998; 51°30′46″N 0°06′31″W	1286279	6 Kings Bench Walk More images
7 Kings Bench Walk	Inner Temple, City and County of the City of London	Inns of Court	Late 17th century	4 January 1950	TQ3135180976; 51°30′45″N 0°06′31″W	1064650	7 Kings Bench Walk More images
Middle Temple Hall	Middle Temple, City and County of the City of London	Inns of Court	1562–73	4 January 1950	TQ3114880961; 51°30′45″N 0°06′41″W	1064609	Middle Temple Hall More images
Middle Temple Gatehouse	Middle Temple, City and County of the City of London	Inns of Court	1684	4 January 1950	TQ3114081104; 51°30′49″N 0°06′42″W	1064612	Middle Temple Gatehouse More images
Middle Temple Gateway from Devereux Court	Middle Temple, City and County of the City of London	Gate	Late 17th century	4 January 1950	TQ3108481009; 51°30′46″N 0°06′45″W	1193846	Middle Temple Gateway from Devereux Court More images
Middle Temple, 4–6 Pump Court	Middle Temple, City and County of the City of London	Inns of Court	1686	4 January 1950	TQ3116881031; 51°30′47″N 0°06′40″W	1193870	Middle Temple, 4–6 Pump Court More images
Staple Inn, Numbers 1–4 Holborn Bars	City and County of the City of London	House	18th century	14 May 1974	TQ3115881588; 51°31′05″N 0°06′40″W	1246103	Staple Inn, Numbers 1–4 Holborn Bars More images
Staple Inn, Numbers 4, 5 and 6 and attached pump	High Holborn, City and County of the City of London	Inns of Chancery	c. 1586	24 October 1951	TQ3115781585; 51°31′05″N 0°06′40″W	1246100	Staple Inn, Numbers 4, 5 and 6 and attached pump More images

== See also ==
- Grade II* listed buildings in the City of London
- List of Christopher Wren churches in London
