= One Essex Court =

Barristers' chambers in London, England

- Headquarters: London, EC4; United Kingdom
- No. of offices: London and Singapore
- Major practice areas: Commercial law
- Key people: Daniel Toledano KC and Sonia Tolaney KC (Heads of Chambers)
- Date founded: 1966
- Website: www.oeclaw.co.uk

One Essex Court is a set of barristers' chambers located at 1 Essex Court, Middle Temple, London. The chambers, founded in 1966, specialises in commercial litigation. It is distinct from 1 Essex Court and Essex Court Chambers.

It currently comprises 131 full-time members, 56 of whom are silks or King's Counsel. One Essex Court's members include well-known silks Lord Grabiner KC and Laurence Rabinowitz KC.

One Essex Court is considered to be part of the Bar's Magic Circle. It is ranked in the top band for commercial litigation by both Chambers and Partners and Legal 500. It has a turnover of £46.5 million a year. Pupils are paid £80,000 a year, supplemented by earnings in the second six. This is amongst the highest remuneration packages available to pupils.

In 2012, One Essex Court opened a new international office in Singapore.

One Essex Court also runs an annual essay competition for students in conjunction with The Times.

== Notable barristers ==
- Sir Sydney Lipworth KC (commercial law)
- Lady Camilla Bloch KC (corporate and commercial law)
- Peter Leaver KC (contractual law)
- Laurence Rabinowitz KC (commercial law)
- James Edelman, now a justice of the High Court of Australia
- The Lord Wolfson of Tredegar (commercial law)
