= Tanya Russell =

British sculptor born 1968

- Citizenship: British
- Occupation: Sculptor
- Organization: Royal Society of Sculptors
- Parents: Edwin Russell (father); Lorne McKean (mother)

Tanya Russell (1968) is a British sculptor who works in bronze. Her work primarily depicts animals. She is a member of the Royal Society of Sculptors.

== Early life ==
Russell completed a seven-year apprenticeship at her parents' Edwin Russell and Lorne McKean's studio, Lethendry Studios.

== Career ==
She founded The Art Academy in London in the year 2000 and served as its principal until 2017. The academy was based on Union Street and moved to Southwark Street in 2007.

In 2012, A & C Black published Russell's Modelling and Sculpting the Figure.

== Notable works ==
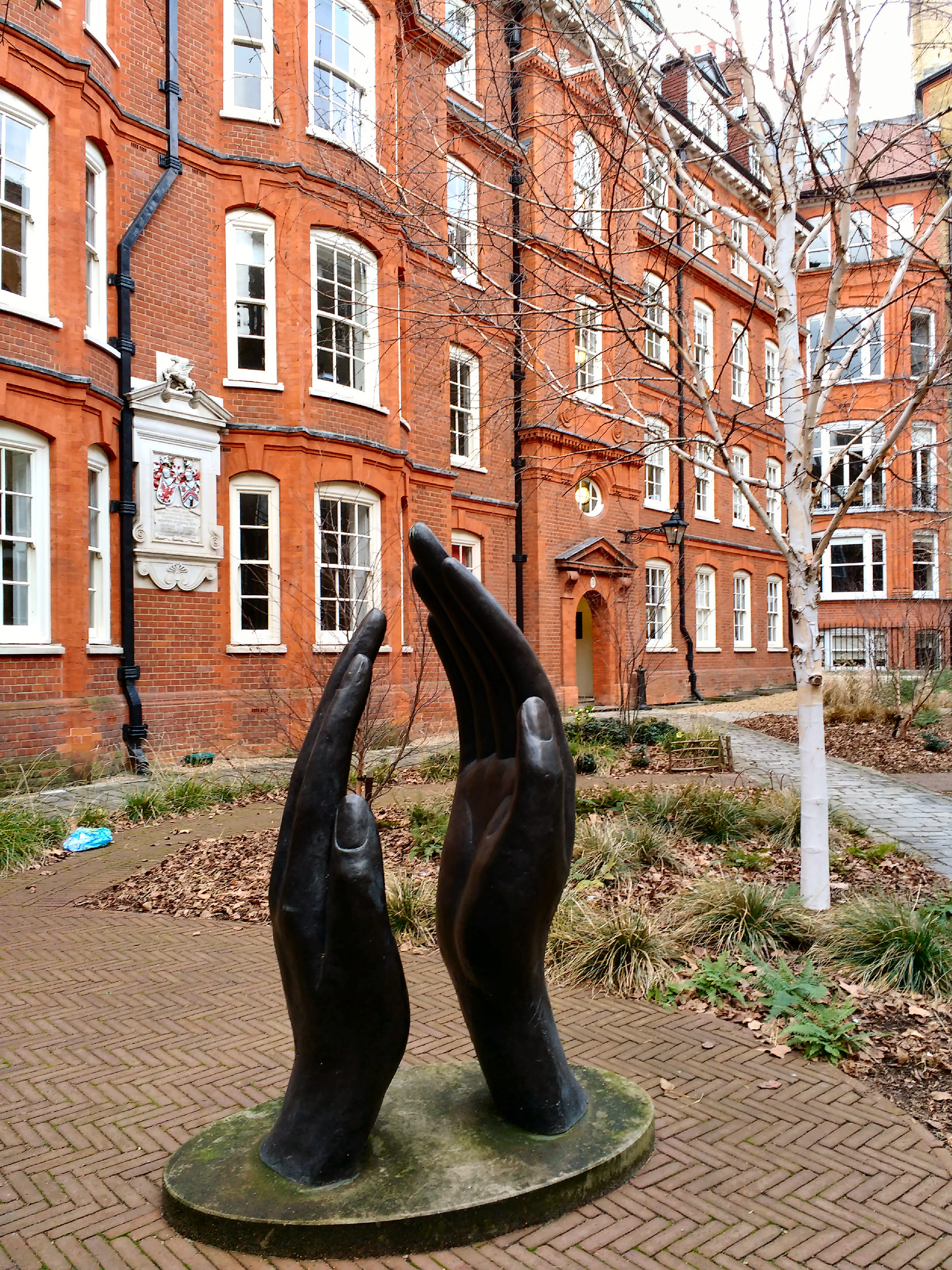
The Hands of Justice by Tanya Russell, Hare Court

In 2007, the Honourable Society of the Inner Temple commissioned Russell to create a bronze sculpture of hands. The sculpture is called Hands of Justice and stands in Hare Court, Inner Temple.

Russell sculpted a leopard that the London Stock Exchange displayed in Paternoster Square. She also created the Stag for Stag Lodge in Wimbledon, London.

She created the Swooping House Martins in Fulham in 2023.

Russell's sculpture of Streetcat Bob from A Street Cat Named Bob, based on The World According to Bob by the author James Bowen, is located on Islington Green in London.

In 2025, Aston Villa F.C. commissioned Russell to create a bronze lion statue to celebrate the club's 150-year anniversary. Brian Little and Dennis Mortimer unveiled the statue, which sits behind Villa Park's North Stand.
