= The Old Deanery =

The Old Deanery is the name of:

- The Old Deanery, Lincoln, in England
- The Old Deanery, Ripon, in England
- Old Deanery, St Paul's, in London
- The Old Deanery, Wells, in England
