= King's Bench Walk, London =

Street in the City of London

Coordinates: 51.5132°N 0.1092°W

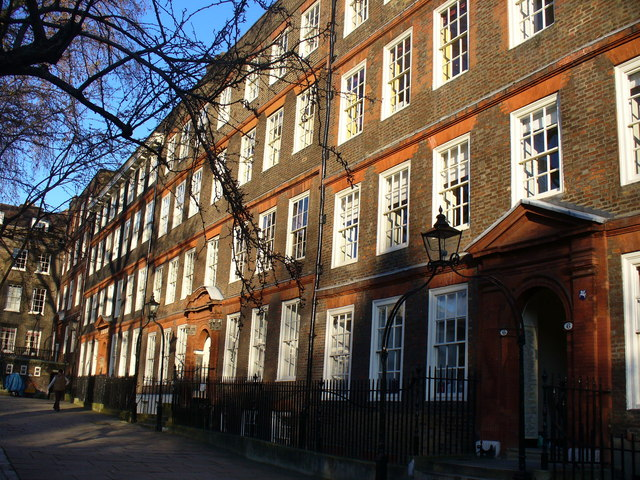
King's Bench Walk

King's Bench Walk is a street in Temple, in the City of London. It is mainly made up of barristers' chambers.

== History ==
King's Bench Walk is located in the Inner Temple, one of the four Inns of Court. The other three Inns of Court are Middle Temple, Lincoln's Inn and Gray's Inn. The area borrows its name from the Order of the Poor Knights of the Temple of Solomon, more commonly known as the Knights Templar which is a historical western Christian military order that was established in 1118 AD.

In 1162 the Templars purchased the grounds now known as Temple to be used as their new, larger headquarters. One of the oldest structures still remaining is the Temple Church which was consecrated in 1185. The Temple Bar gateway which stands outside the Royal Courts of Justice and marks the point between Westminster and the City of London also takes its name from the historical Order.

Following the downfall of the Knights Templar in 1307 and its dissolution by Pope Clement V in 1312, the grounds were given to the Knights Hospitaller, Order of St John. It was during the 14th century whilst the Temple was still in Hospitaller possession that two colleges of law were founded within its grounds. By 1388, two distinct societies had formed and they were known as Inner Temple and Middle Temple. Since then, the Temple has been associated with the legal profession and the Bar.

== Buildings in King's Bench Walk ==
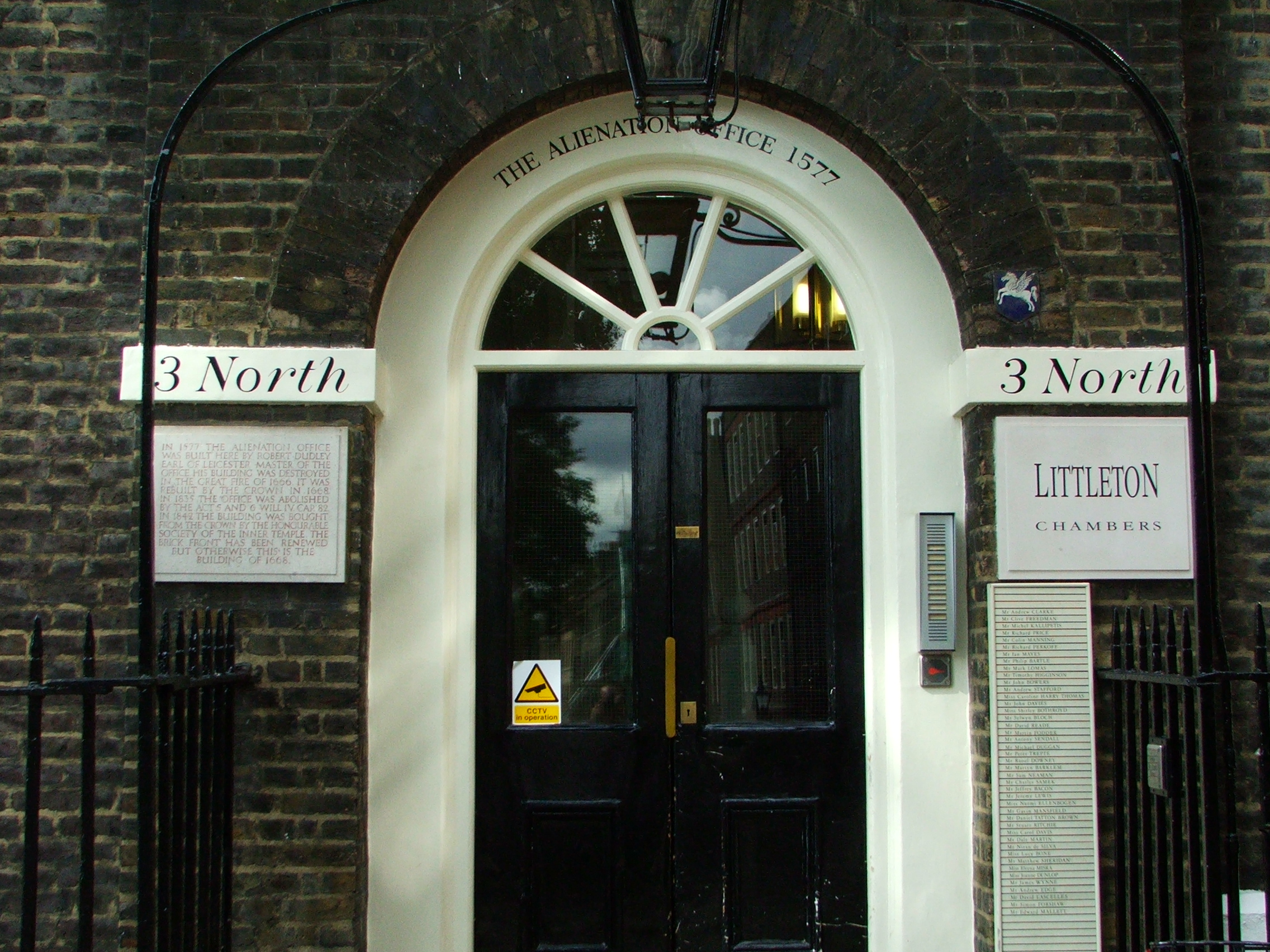
The Alienation Office

King's Bench Walk takes its name from the Office of the King's Bench, which was first situated along the row in 1621. King's Bench Walk has held buildings since before 1548. These buildings were destroyed during the Great Fire of London in 1666. The buildings that replaced them were also destroyed in the subsequent London fire of 1677.

Before the fires of 1666 and 1677, 4 King's Bench Walk, with what is now 5 and 6 King's Bench Walk was known as King's Bench Buildings. 4 King's Bench Walk is located opposite the Inner Temple Library. Like the other buildings on the row, it was rebuilt in 1678 following the London fire of 1677. The building bears an inscription that documents these events:

Conflagratam Ano 1677. Fabricatam Ano 1678. Richardo Powell Armiger Thesaurar

The inscription can be seen on four separate tiles divided by doric triglyphs placed above the arched doorway to number four which also mentions Richard Powell being treasurer of the Inner Temple when 4 King's Bench Walk was rebuilt in 1678.

The archway is ascribed to Sir Christopher Wren, one of the most highly acclaimed English architects in history who is most recognised for designing St Paul's Cathedral on the top of Ludgate Hill. More of his architectural work can be seen on the eastern end of Fleet Street, namely St Bride's Church which boasts the tallest steeple to be designed by Wren. 4 King's Bench Walk is one of the few fortunate buildings in the Inner Temple to have escaped destruction by enemy action during the second world war.

In addition, the signature "Thos Dainand", dated "March 19, 1793", has been scratched into one of the window panes of the first-floor library.

On 4 January 1950, 4 King's Bench Walk became a Grade I listed building.

Numbers 12 and 13 King's Bench Walk are Grade II listed buildings. They were originally built in the early 19th century, in a plain Regency style faced with Bath stone, but were destroyed in the Blitz and rebuilt in replica after the war.

== Chambers in King's Bench Walk ==
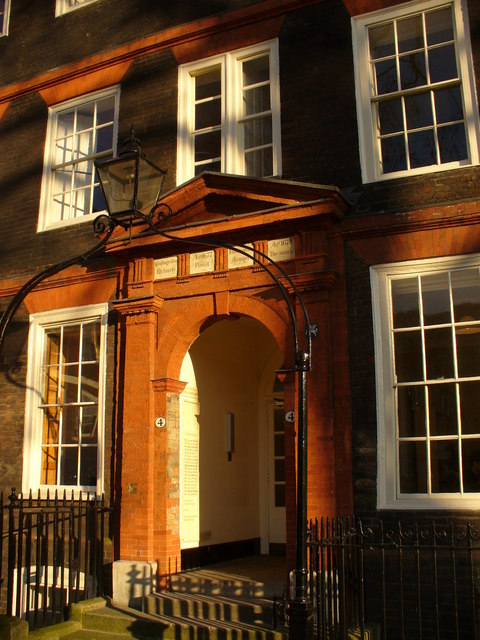
4 King's Bench Walk

1 King's Bench Walk houses 1KBW, specialising in family law. Former members of 1KBW have included Baroness Hale, Sir Andrew McFarlane and Dame Judith Parker.

2 King's Bench Walk houses the London office of 2KBW. Founders in 1953 included Norman Skelhorn. Practice areas include crime, family, civil, immigration, courts martial, inquests and public inquiries.

4 King's Bench Walk has been home to various sets of barristers over the years. However there is now only one, 4 King's Bench Walk Chambers (known as 4KBW) headed by Gavin Holme. 4KBW is one of the last remaining true common law chambers, with barristers with expertise in every area of the law. In addition there is a firm of solicitors, Preiskel Solicitors, who specialise in media and telecommunications law, and a private residence on the top floor. Notable former residents of number four include Sir Harold George Nicolson, diplomat, author, diarist and politician and Sir Ralph Norman Angell, lecturer, journalist, author, and Member of Parliament.

5 King's Bench Walk, or 5KBW is engaged in defence and prosecution work at every level of the criminal justice system.

6 King's Bench Walk was established in the 1930s and was a barristers' chambers for some 50 years, before those chambers moved to College Hill in the City of London in June 2013, to become known as 6KBW College Hill.

7 King's Bench Walk houses the front entrance of 7KBW, who occupy several buildings. They are advocates and advisers in commercial disputes. 3 Pump Court and 7 King’s Bench Walk merged in 1967, and former members include Lord Denning, Lord Brandon, Lord Goff, Lord Hobhouse, Lord Justice Andrew Longmore, Sir Julian Flaux, Sir Clive Freedman, Sir Christopher Butcher and Sir Simon Picken.

9 King's Bench Walk is the office of 9KBW, specialising in high-level and general criminal cases, regulatory, animal protection, extradition and immigration work.

10 King's Bench Walk houses 10KBW on the ground floor, with teams specialising in civil, criminal, disciplinary and regulatory, family and immigration law.

11 King's Bench Walk. The chambers at 11 King's Bench Walk was founded by Derry Irvine, whose pupils included Tony Blair and Cherie Booth. 11KBW now specialises in commercial, employment, media and public law. Resident barristers have included Lord Sales, Dame Karen Steyn, Sir Jonathan Swift, Sir Clive Sheldon, Sir Akhlaq Choudhury, Sir John Cavanagh, Sir Charles Bourne, Eldred Tabachnik and Philippe Sands.

12 King's Bench Walk is home to the chambers of Paul Russell, commonly known as 12KBW. 12KBW was led in the early 20th century by Montague Berryman. Gerald Gardiner, Baron Gardiner and Peter Rawlinson, Baron Rawlinson of Ewell previously practised from this set. 12KBW now occupies both number 12 and number 13 King's Bench Walk, and is a top-ranked set for personal injury, industrial disease, travel, and related areas of law. Shabana Mahmood was a barrister at 12KBW.

== In literature ==
King's Bench Walk is mentioned in numerous novels such as Charles Dickens' A Tale of Two Cities:

"After a few dull efforts to get to sleep again, which the man dexterously combated by stirring the fire continuously for five minutes, he got up, tossed his hat on, and walked out. He turned into the Temple, and, having revived himself by twice pacing the pavements of King's Bench-walk and Paper-buildings, turned into the Stryver chambers."

— Charles Dickens, A Tale of Two Cities (1859)

King's Bench Walk has specific mention in chapter one of the novel The Red Thumb Mark by R. Austin Freeman. The novel forms part of a series of detective stories featuring the medico-legal forensic investigator Dr. Thorndyke;

"Conflagratam Ano 1677. Fabricatam Ano 1698. Richardo Powell Armiger Thesaurar." The words, set in four panels, which formed a frieze beneath the pediment of a fine brick portico, summarised the history of one of the tall houses at the upper end of King's Bench Walk and as I, somewhat absent mindedly, read over the inscription, my attention was divided between admiration of the exquisitely finished carved brickwork and the quiet dignity of the building, and an effort to reconstitute the dead and gone Richard Powell, and the stirring times in which he played his part."

— Richard Austin Freeman, The Red Thumb Mark (1907), Chapter I

In The Squire of Alsatia, Thomas Shadwell refers to King's Bench Walk in its previous form, as King's Bench Buildings:

"I have been at your brother's house, and they say he is come to some lawyer's chamber in the King's Bench Buildings"

— Thomas Shadwell, The Squire of Alsatia (1688)
