= John Cavanagh (judge) =

British judge

The Honourable Mr Justice Cavanagh
- Royal coat of arms of the United Kingdom

Justice of the High Court
- Incumbent
- Assumed office 1 October 2019
- Monarch: Charles III

Personal details
- Born: 17 June 1960 (age 66) Belfast; United Kingdom
- Education: Clare College, Cambridge; New College, Oxford

Sir John Patrick Cavanagh (born 17 June 1960) is a British High Court judge.

== Early life end education ==
Born in Belfast, Cavanagh was educated at Warwick School. He studied at New College, Oxford, receiving an MA in law and followed this by postgraduate study at Clare College, Cambridge, where he completed an LLM.

== Career ==
From 1979 to 1980, he worked as a social worker at St Philip's School in Airdrie. Later he was an instructor in law at University of Illinois College of Law from 1983 to 1984, then a part-time lecturer in law at New College from 1984 to 1987. He was called to the bar at Middle Temple in 1985, took silk in 2001, and served as a recorder from 2004 to 2019; from 2013 to 2019, he was joint head of chambers at 11 King's Bench Walk. As a practitioner, he appeared before the European Court of Justice and the Supreme Court of the United Kingdom. He was appointed a deputy High Court judge in 2017.

=== High Court appointment ===
On 1 October 2019, Cavanagh was appointed a judge of the High Court and assigned to the Queen's Bench Division. He received the customary knighthood in the same year. Since 2021, he has been Presiding Judge of the South Eastern Circuit, replacing Sir Andrew Edis who was promoted to the Court of Appeal.

== Personal life ==
In 1989, he married Suzanne Tolley, with whom he has a son and three daughters.

== Notable cases ==
Notable cases heard by Cavanagh include:

- Murder of Sara Sharif
