= Hare Court, Inner Temple =

Complex of historic legal buildings in Temple, London

Hare Court
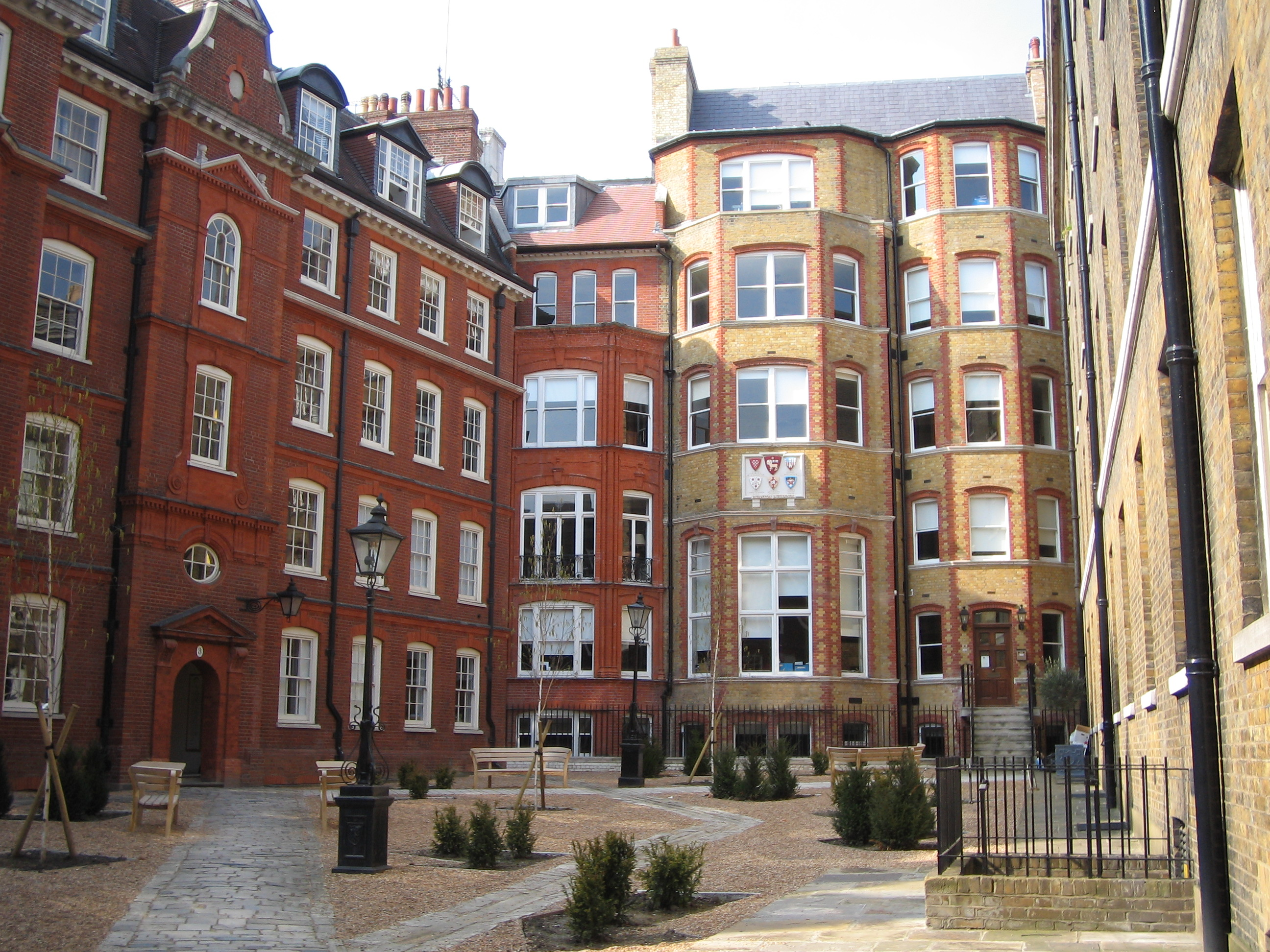
- Numbers 2 and 3 Hare Court are to the left

- Location within Greater London
- 51.513°N 0.1108°W
- Type: courtyard
- Location: Inner Temple, Temple, City of London

History
- Built: late 17th century

Site notes
- Architectural style: Georgian
- Owner: Privately owned

Listed Building – Grade I
- Official name: 1, Hare Court
- Designated: 4 January 1950
- Reference no.: 1359200

Listed Building – Grade II
- Official name: 2 and 3, Hare Court
- Designated: 10 November 1977
- Reference no.: 1193787

Hare Court is a complex of buildings in Inner Temple, in the Temple district in the City of London. It forms a courtyard with Pump Court and stands directly west of Temple Church. Hare Court was developed in the late 17th century, and Number 1 dates from thus time. Numbers 2 and 3 are late 19th century additions to the design of Sir Thomas Graham Jackson. In the 21st century Hare Court houses mainly barristers' chambers. The buildings are constructed of London red brick. Number 1 is a Grade I listed building, while Numbers 2 and 3 are listed at Grade II.

== History and description ==
The area of Temple lies on the western edge of the City of London, on its border with the City of Westminster. In the mid-12th century, the military order of the Knights Templar established themselves in the area, constructing their Temple Church at its centre. Following the suppression of the Templars in 1312, control of the district passed to the Order of St John which began to lease buildings in the area to legal clerks, then exclusively clerics, as offices and residences. This saw the establishment of the Middle and Inner Temples, as two of the four Inns of Court to which all barristers practicing in England and Wales must belong.

The Temple area saw considerable loss during the Great Fire of London, and subsequent fires in the next decades. This saw the initiation of an ambitious re-building scheme, begun with New Court which was undertaken by the developer, Nicholas Barbon in around 1675. The governors of the Inner Temple decreed that future developments in the area be modelled on Barbon's "London red brick" style, which accounts for the general uniformity of the designs. Number 1 Hare Court dates from the late 17th century, while 2 and 3 are of the late 19th century, to a design by Sir Thomas Graham Jackson.

In the 21st century, Hare Court mainly houses barristers' chambers including 2 Hare Court. (Note: In the centre of the court is located a sculpture, entitled Hands of Justice. Commissioned by the Honourable Society of the Inner Temple, the work was undertaken by Tanya Russell.)

The buildings comprising Hare Court form two sides of a courtyard, in conjunction with the buildings of Pump Court. They are constructed of London red brick and are of four storeys with basements. Numbers 2 and 3 also have gabled attics. Pevsner calls the style of the latter buildings Norman Shaw, and notes that they are the only buildings in this style within the Temple complex. All have stone dressings. Number 1 holds a Grade I historic listing designation, while Numbers 2 and 3 are listed at Grade II.

== Gallery ==
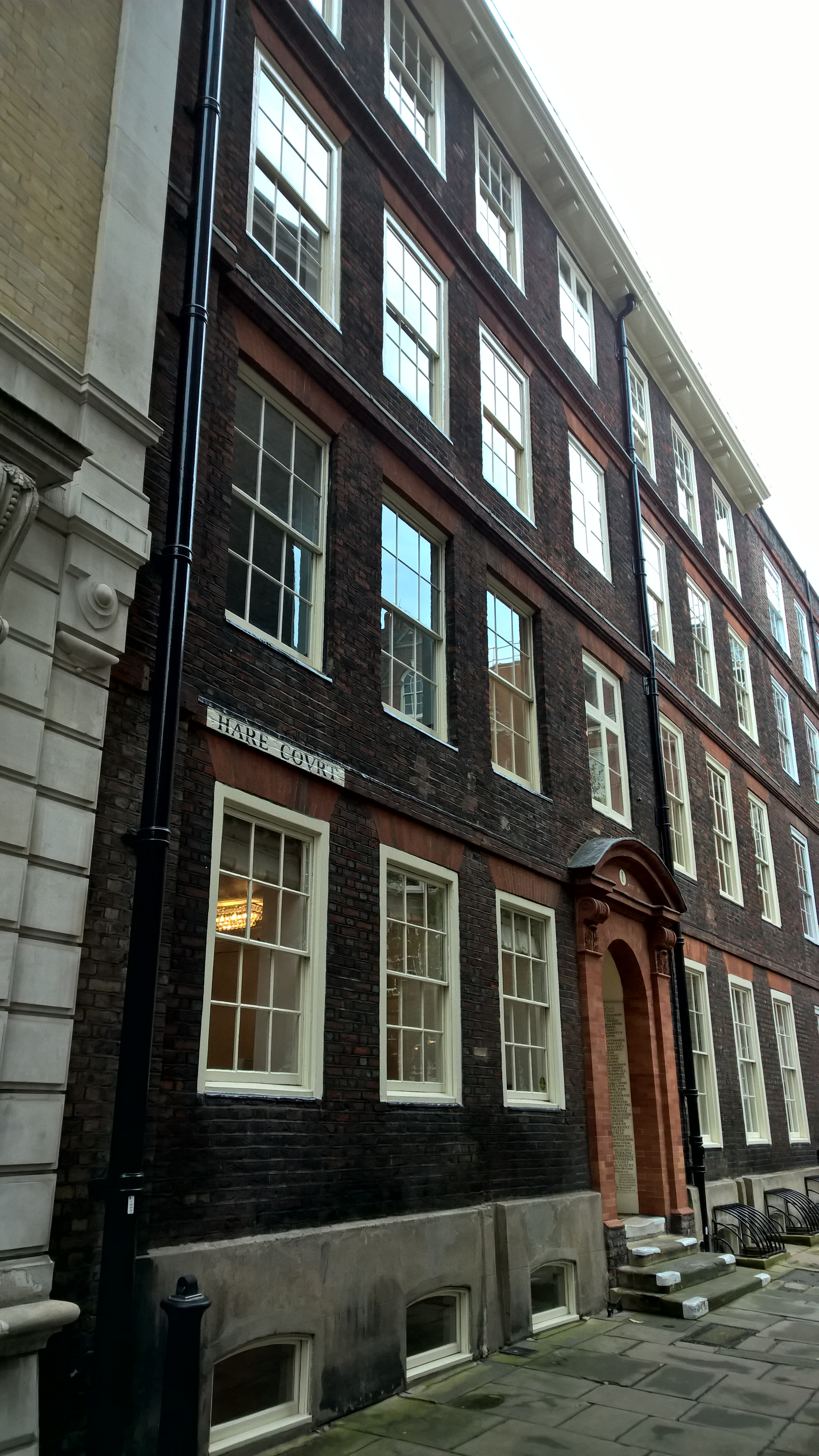
1, Hare Court

2, Hare Court

3, Hare Court

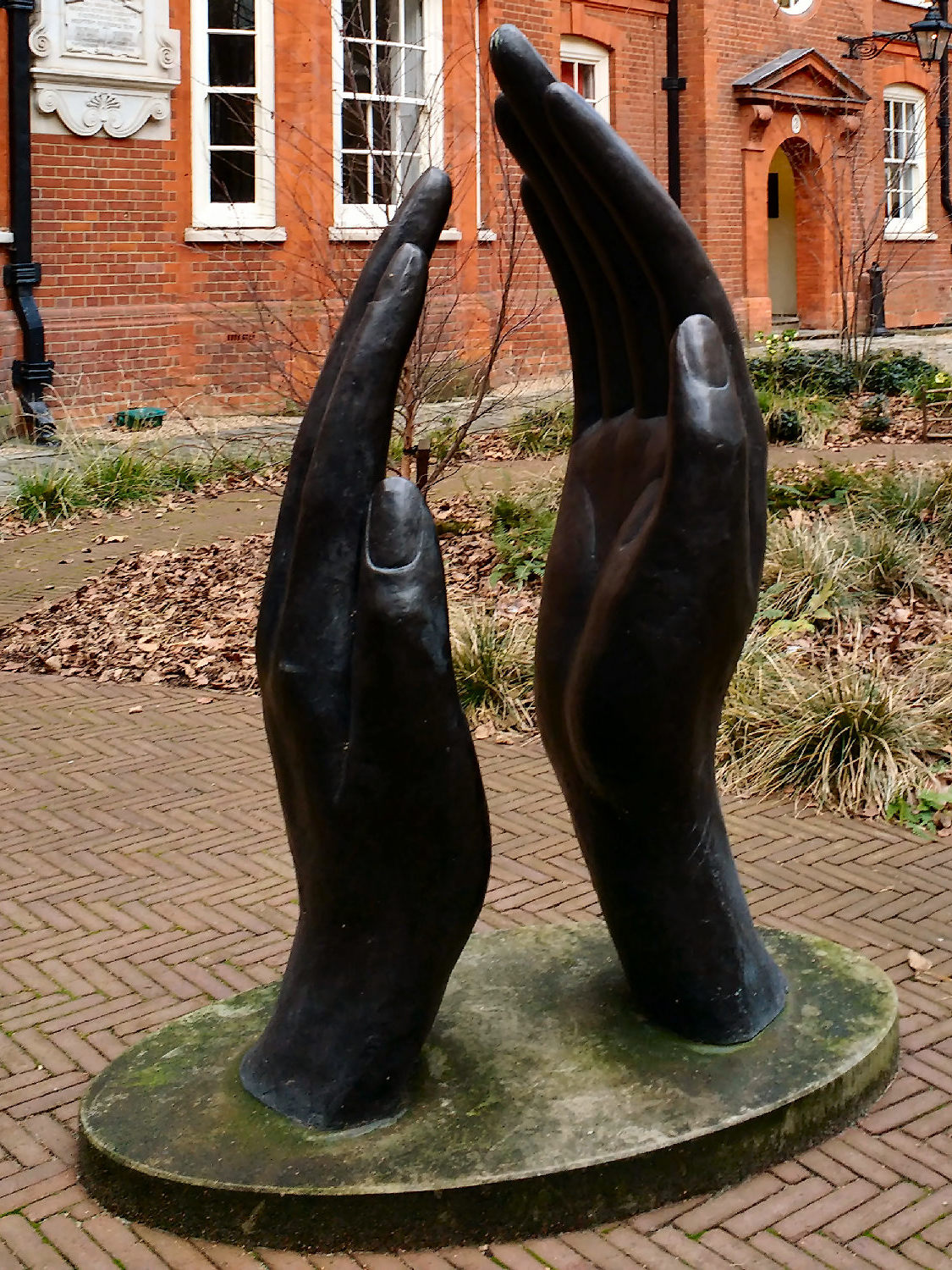
Hands of Justice sculpture by Tanya Russell

== Sources ==
- Bradley, Simon; Pevsner, Nikolaus (2002). London 1: The City of London. The Buildings of England. New Haven, US and London: Yale University Press. ISBN 0-300-09624-0.

== See also ==
- 2 Hare Court
