= Essex Court Chambers =

Barristers' chambers in London, England

Essex Court Chambers is a set of commercial barristers in Lincoln's Inn Fields, central London. It has 110 tenants, of whom 55 are King's Counsel, also known as Silks. It is considered by legal commentators to be one of the 'Magic Circle' of London's most prestigious commercial barristers' chambers.

The members of Essex Court Chambers are recognised specialists in all areas of commercial and financial litigation, arbitration, public law and public international law. Specialist practice areas include banking & finance, civil fraud, asset-tracing, crypto, modern chancery, international human rights, offshore, insolvency, insurance & reinsurance, energy, trade, shipping, revenue and employment.

The former Lord Chief Justice, Sir John Thomas, was a member of Essex Court Chambers when he was at the Bar. Other members or former members of Essex Court Chambers include Lord Collins of Mapesbury, Dame Rosalyn Higgins, Sir Christopher Greenwood, Lord Millett, Lord Steyn, Lord Savile and Lord Mustill.

The set is named after their former premises at 4 Essex Court in the Temple which it left in 1994. The chambers in its current incarnation date back to 1961. Lord Mustill, Michael Kerr (later Lord Justice Kerr), Anthony Evans (later Lord Justice Evans), Anthony Diamond (later Judge Diamond QC) and Robert MacCrindle were its founding members.

Essex Court Chambers is listed in Band 1 in Commercial, Fraud, International Arbitration, Offshore and Public International Law in the Chambers and Partners UK Bar Guide in 2024.

The set is also listed in Tier 1 in Art, Commercial, Fraud, International Arbitration and Public International Law in the Legal 500 UK Bar Guide 2024.

In 2021 it was announced that Essex Court Chambers was one of four entities to be sanctioned by China.

== Notes and sources ==
Notes

Sources

- Essex Court Chambers. London: Chambers and Partners. Archived from the original on 19 July 2012.
- Dowell, Katy (2011). "The Bar". The Lawyer. London: Centaur Media.
