= Jonathan Swift (judge) =

British judge

The Honourable Mr Justice Swift
- Royal coat of arms of the United Kingdom

Justice of the High Court
- Incumbent
- Assumed office 1 October 2018
- Monarch: Charles III

Personal details
- Born: 11 September 1964 (age 62) Rochford, England
- Education: Emmanuel College, Cambridge; New College, Oxford

Sir Jonathan Mark Swift (born 11 September 1964) is a British High Court judge.

== Early life and education ==
Swift was born in Rochford, England and educated at Southend High School for Boys. He studied at New College, Oxford and completed a BA in 1987. He followed this with an LLM at Emmanuel College, Cambridge in 1988.

He was called to the bar at Inner Temple in 1989 and practised from 11 King's Bench Walk. He was First Treasury Counsel from 2007 to 2014 and took silk in 2010. He served as a recorder from 2010 to 2018 and was appointed deputy High Court judge in 2016.

== High Court career ==
On 1 October 2018, Swift was appointed a High Court judge, and assigned to the Queen's Bench Division. He took the customary knighthood in the same year. Since 2020, he has been judge in charge of the Administrative Court.

On 10 June 2022, Swift ruled in favour of the UK Government that the deportation flights of unsuccessful asylum seekers in the UK to Rwanda should be allowed to proceed, as there was material public interest in doing so. He added in his ruling that the risk posed to refugees was "in the realms of speculation".

On 8 June 2023, Swift ruled in favour of the UK Government, and rejected the appeal of Julian Assange's legal team, which had filed two appeals before the court against then UK Home Secretary Priti Patel's decision to extradite Wikileaks founder being indicted by the United States under the Espionage Act.

== Personal life ==
In 2008, he married barrister Helen Evans with whom he has a son and a daughter.
