= Essex Court, Middle Temple =

Complex of historic legal buildings in Temple, London

Essex Court
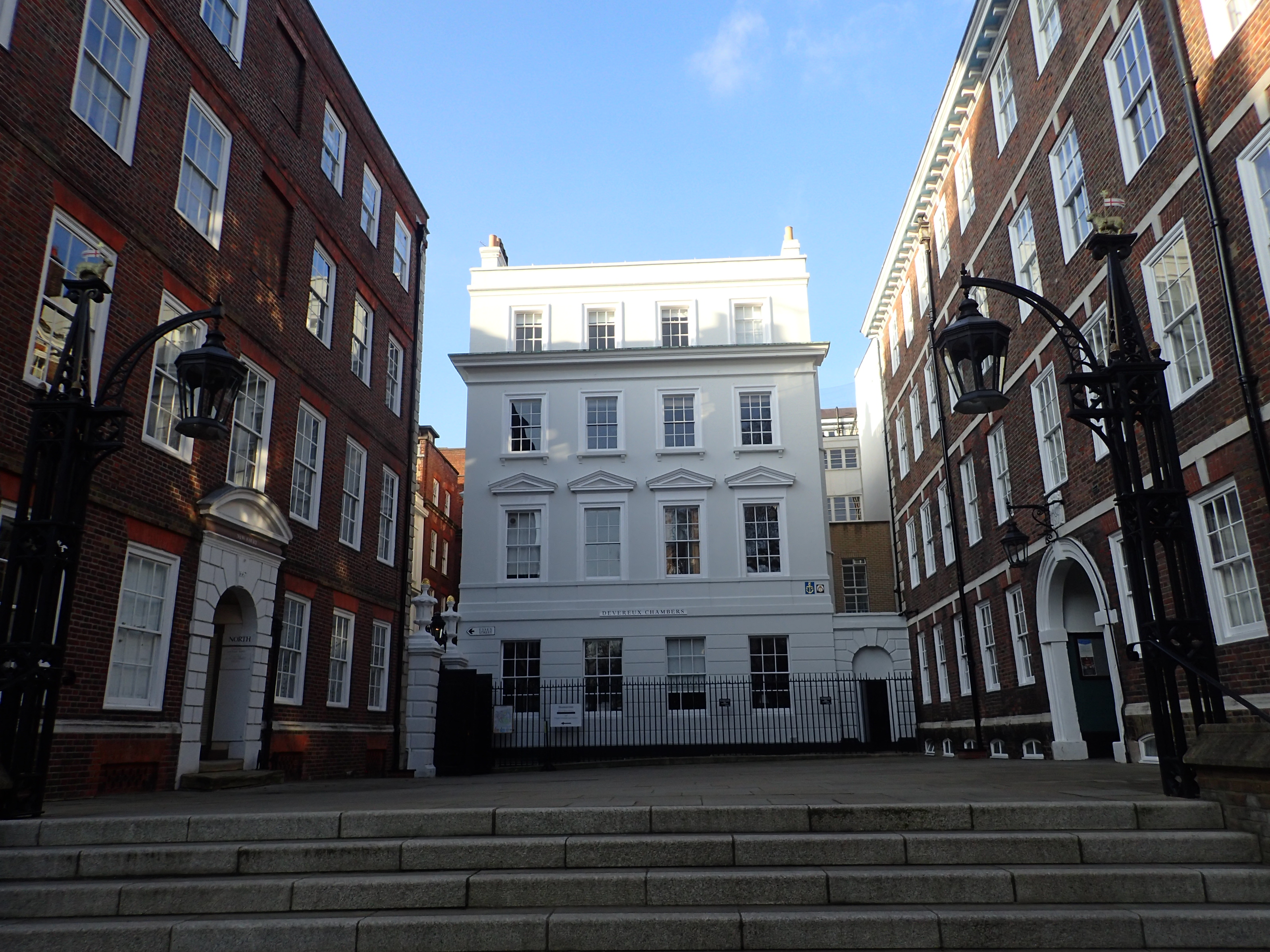
- Two sides of Essex Court with Devereux Chambers in the centre

- Location within Greater London
- 51.5128°N 0.1121°W
- Type: courtyard
- Location: Middle Temple, Temple, City of London

History
- Built: 1670s

Site notes
- Architect(s): Nicholas Barbon, builder
- Owner: Privately owned

Listed Building – Grade I
- Official name: 1, Essex Court
- Designated: 4 January 1950
- Reference no.: 1286024

Listed Building – Grade I
- Official name: 2 and 3, Essex Court
- Designated: 4 January 1950
- Reference no.: 1359199

Listed Building – Grade II*
- Official name: 4, Essex Court
- Designated: 5 June 1972
- Reference no.: 1193758

Essex Court is a complex of buildings in Middle Temple, in the Temple district in the City of London. It forms a courtyard separated from Temple Lane by another court, Brick Court. Essex Court was built by the developer Nicholas Barbon in the late 17th century. In the 21st century it houses mainly barristers' chambers. The buildings are constructed of London red brick. Numbers 1, 2 and 3 Essex Court are Grade I listed buildings, while Number 4, which is slightly later in date, is listed at Grade II*.

== History and description ==
The area of Temple lies on the western edge of the City of London, on its border with the City of Westminster. In the mid-12th century, the military order of the Knights Templar established themselves in the area, constructing their Temple Church at its centre. Following the suppression of the Templars in 1312, control of the district passed to the Order of St John which began to lease buildings in the area to legal clerks, then exclusively clerics, as offices and residences. This saw the establishment of the Middle and Inner Temples, as two of the four Inns of Court to which all barristers practicing in England and Wales must belong.

The Temple area saw considerable loss during the Great Fire of London, and subsequent fires in the next decades. This saw the initiation of an ambitious re-building scheme, begun with New Court which was undertaken by the developer, Nicholas Barbon in around 1675. The governors of the Middle Temple decreed that future developments in the area be modelled on Barbon's "London red brick" style, which accounts for the general uniformity of the designs. Barbon began Essex Court with Numbers 2 and 3, at a date just slightly after New Court. Number 1 followed in 1685, with Number 4 being completed to the same style in the early 18th century, shortly after Barbon's death in 1698.

In the 20th and 21st centuries, Essex Court houses some of London's major barristers' chambers including One Essex Court and Essex Court Chambers (Note: Essex Court Chambers relocated to Lincoln's Inn Fields in 1994.)

The buildings comprising Essex Court form two sides of a courtyard, in conjunction with the buildings of Brick Court. They were originally separated by a dividing range which was destroyed in the Second World War and which was not rebuilt. They are all constructed of London red brick and are of four storeys with basements. All have stone dressings. Numbers 1, 2 and 3 hold Grade I historic listing designations, while Number 4 is listed at Grade II*.

== Gallery ==
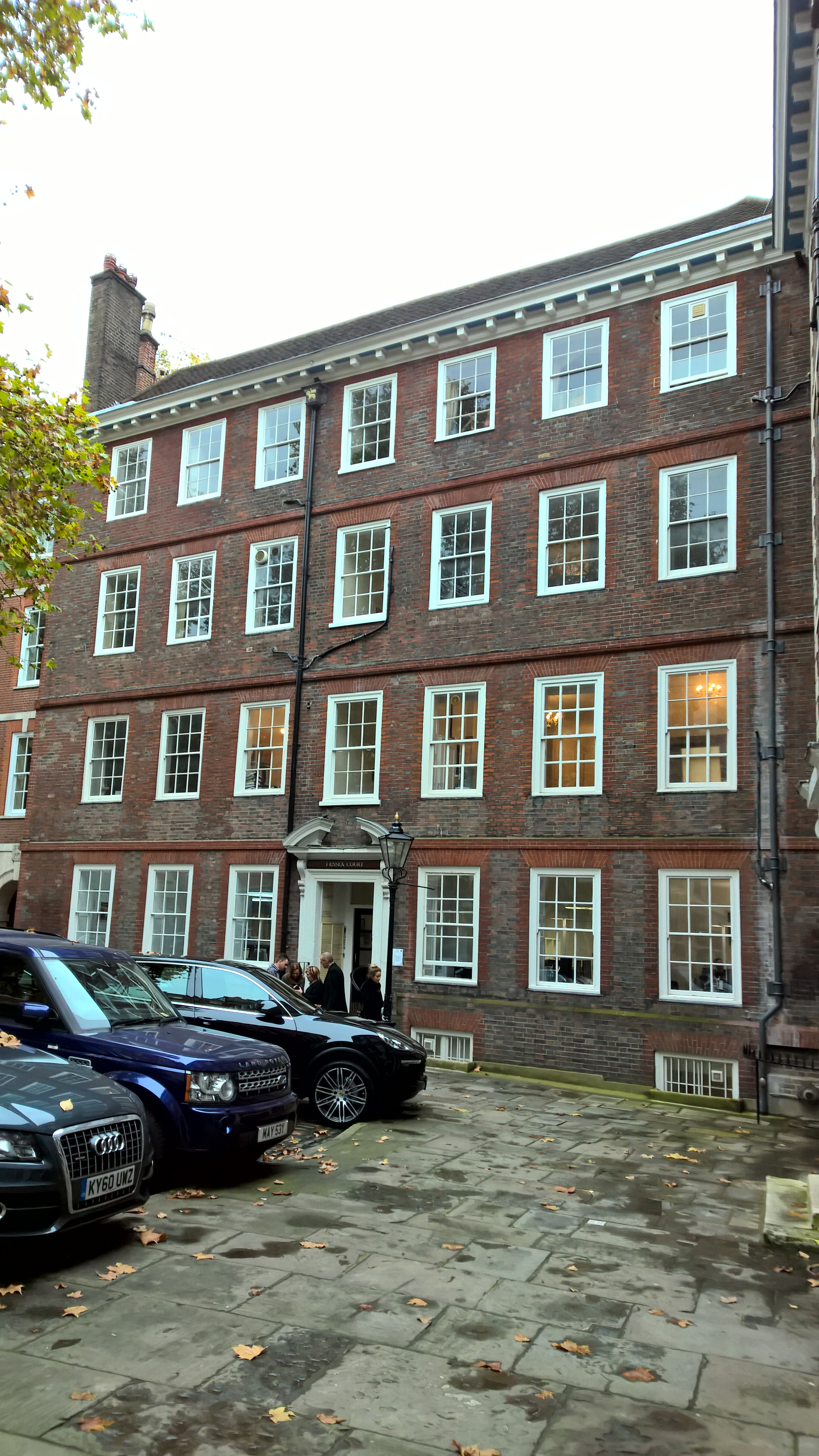
1, Essex Court

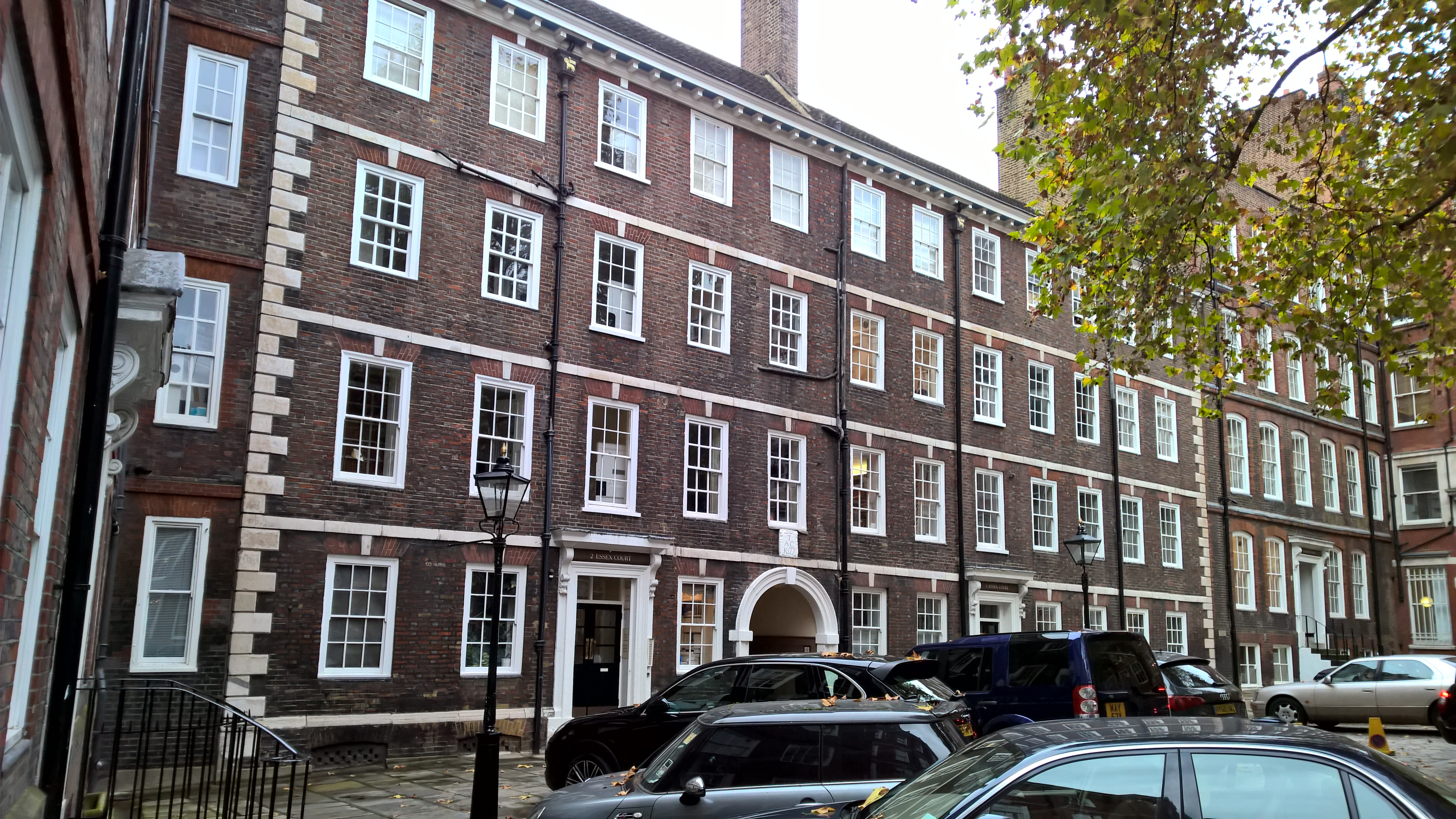
2 and 3, Essex Court

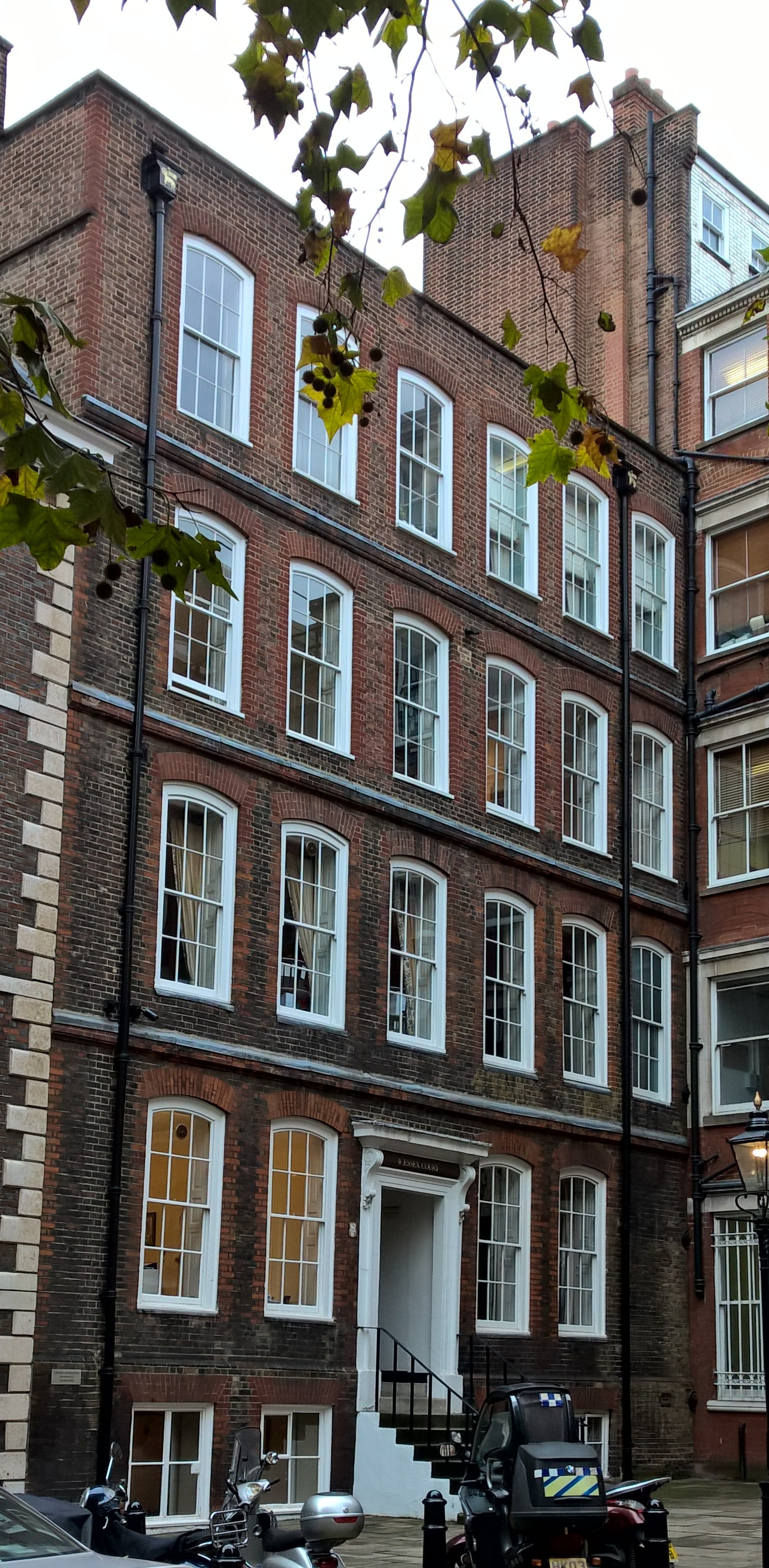
4, Essex Court

== Sources ==
- Bradley, Simon; Pevsner, Nikolaus (2002). London 1: The City of London. The Buildings of England. New Haven, US and London: Yale University Press. ISBN 0-300-09624-0.

== See also ==
- Essex Court Chambers
- One Essex Court
