= Edwin Russell (artist) =

English sculptor (1939–2013)

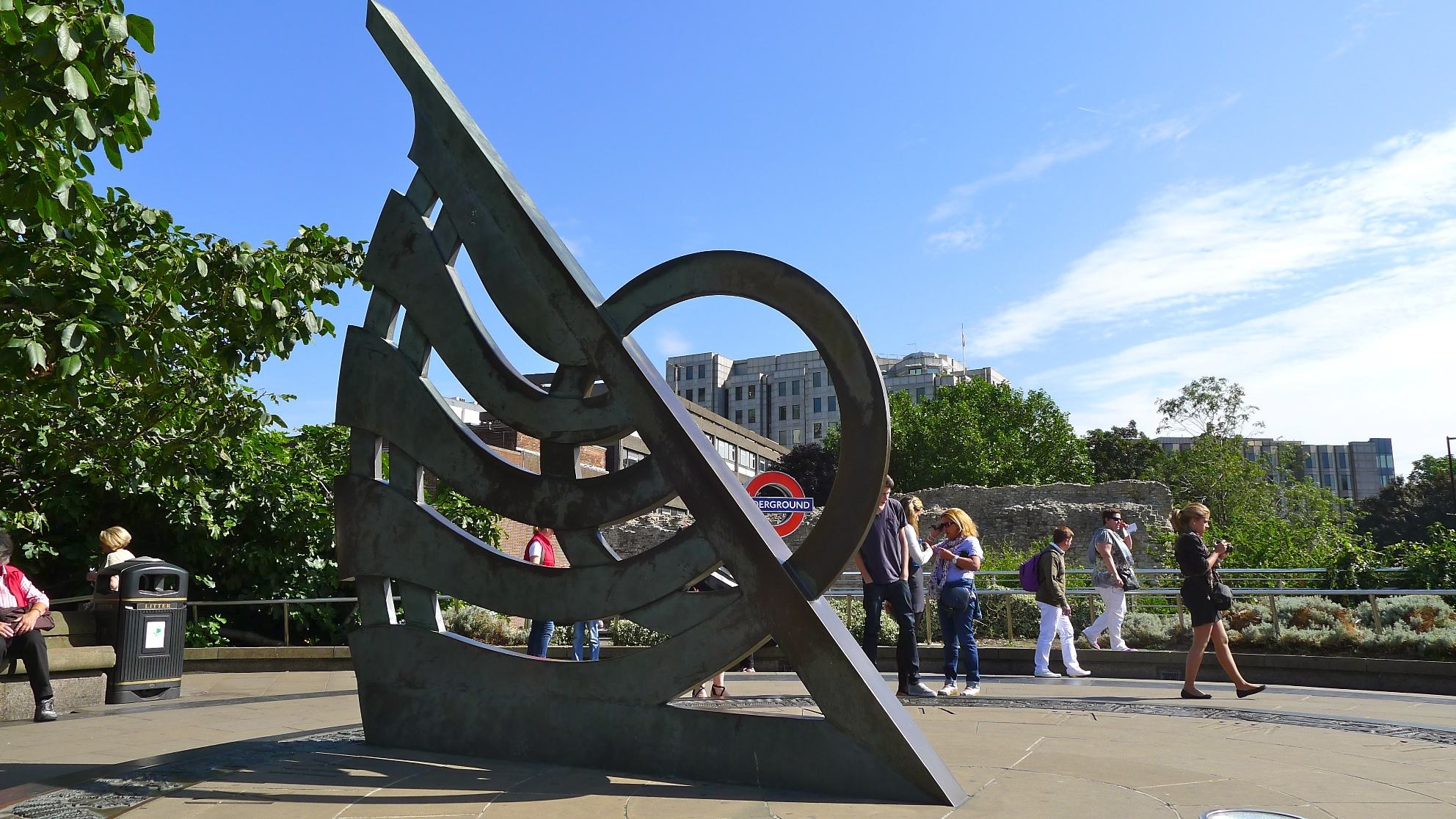
The Tower Hill Sundial

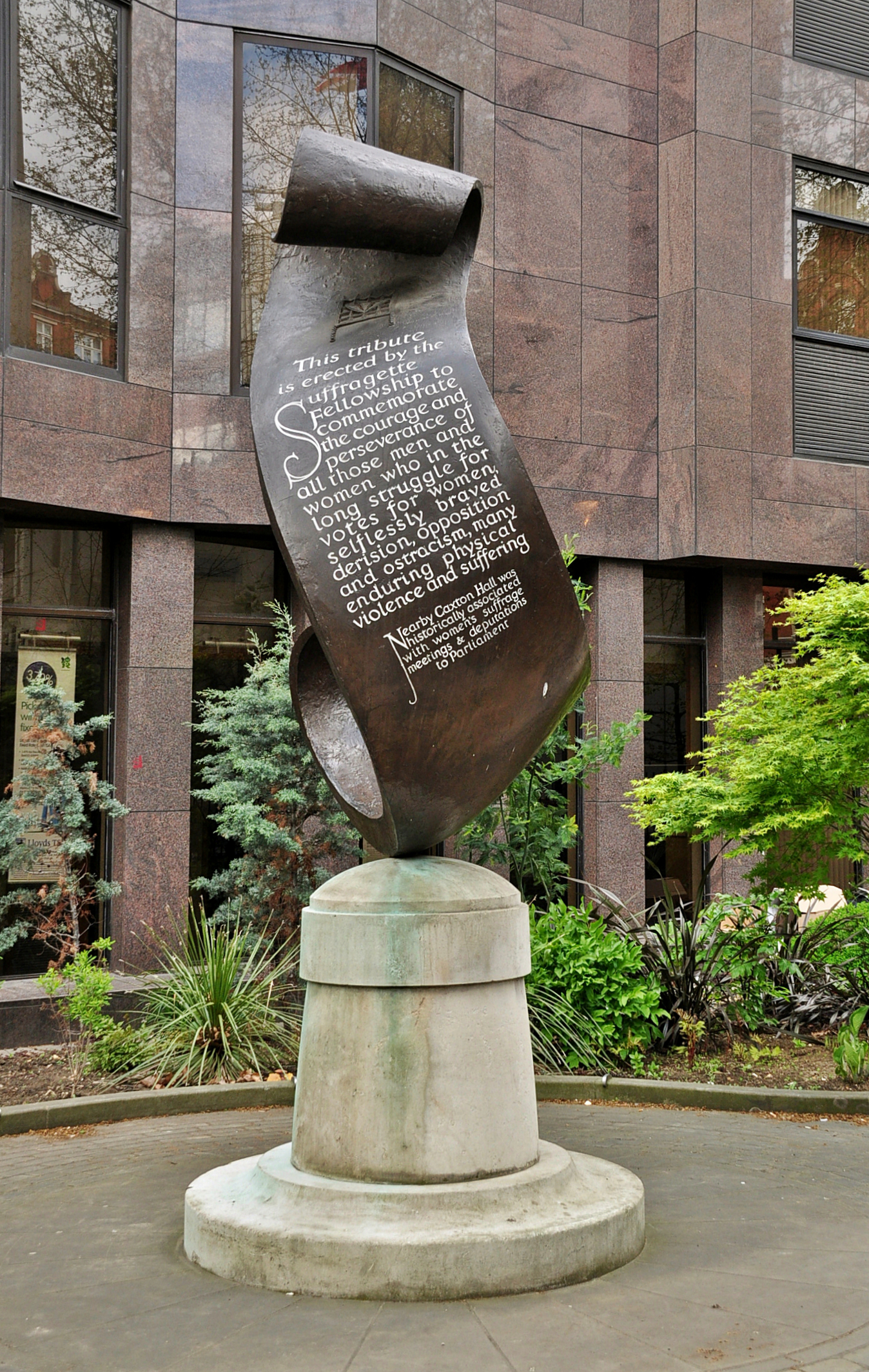
The Suffragette Memorial

Edwin John Cumming Russell (1939–2013), who was born in Heathfield, Sussex, was an English sculptor. He studied at the Brighton School of Art and the Royal Academy School.

He was married to fellow sculptor Lorne McKean. They worked together in sculpting the Suffragette Memorial, an outdoor sculpture in Victoria, London, commemorating those who fought for women's suffrage in the United Kingdom. The memorial was unveiled in 1970.

His sculpture in Warrington, Mad Hatter's Tea Party, was unveiled by Diana, Princess of Wales in 1984.

With the architect John Chitty he created the Tower Hill Sundial in the London Borough of Tower Hamlets. The sundial is outside the entrance to Tower Hill tube station and was commissioned by London Underground in 1990.

Russell died on 16 February 2013.

== Sources ==
- Ward-Jackson, Philip (2011), Public Sculpture of Historic Westminster: Volume 1, Public Sculpture of Britain, vol. 14, Liverpool: Liverpool University Press, ISBN 978-1-84631-691-3
