= Lorne McKean =

English sculptor

Lorne McKean (born 1939) is an English sculptor. She studied at the Guildford School of Art and the Royal Academy School, before being elected as a Fellow of the Royal Society of British Sculptors in 1972. McKean's husband was Edwin Russell (died 2013), a fellow sculptor.

== Selected public artworks ==
Image	Title / subject	Location and coordinates	Date	Type	Material	Dimensions	Designation	Notes
	Girl and Swan	Kings Road, Reading, UK 51.4548°N 0.9647°W	1984	Statue	Bronze			Depicts a young girl reaching up to touch a swan flying overhead.
	Horsham Heritage Sundial	Blackhorse Way Forum, Horsham, UK 51.06184°N 0.33151°W	2003	Sculpture; Sundial				With Damien Fennell and Edwin Russell
	Pirie's Donkey and Cart Play Sculpture	Piries Place, Horsham, UK 51.06228°N 0.32658°W	c.1991	Sculpture				
	Swans	Swan Walk Shopping centre, Horsham, UK	1990	Sculpture				
