= The Old Deanery, Ripon =

Building in Ripon, North Yorkshire, England

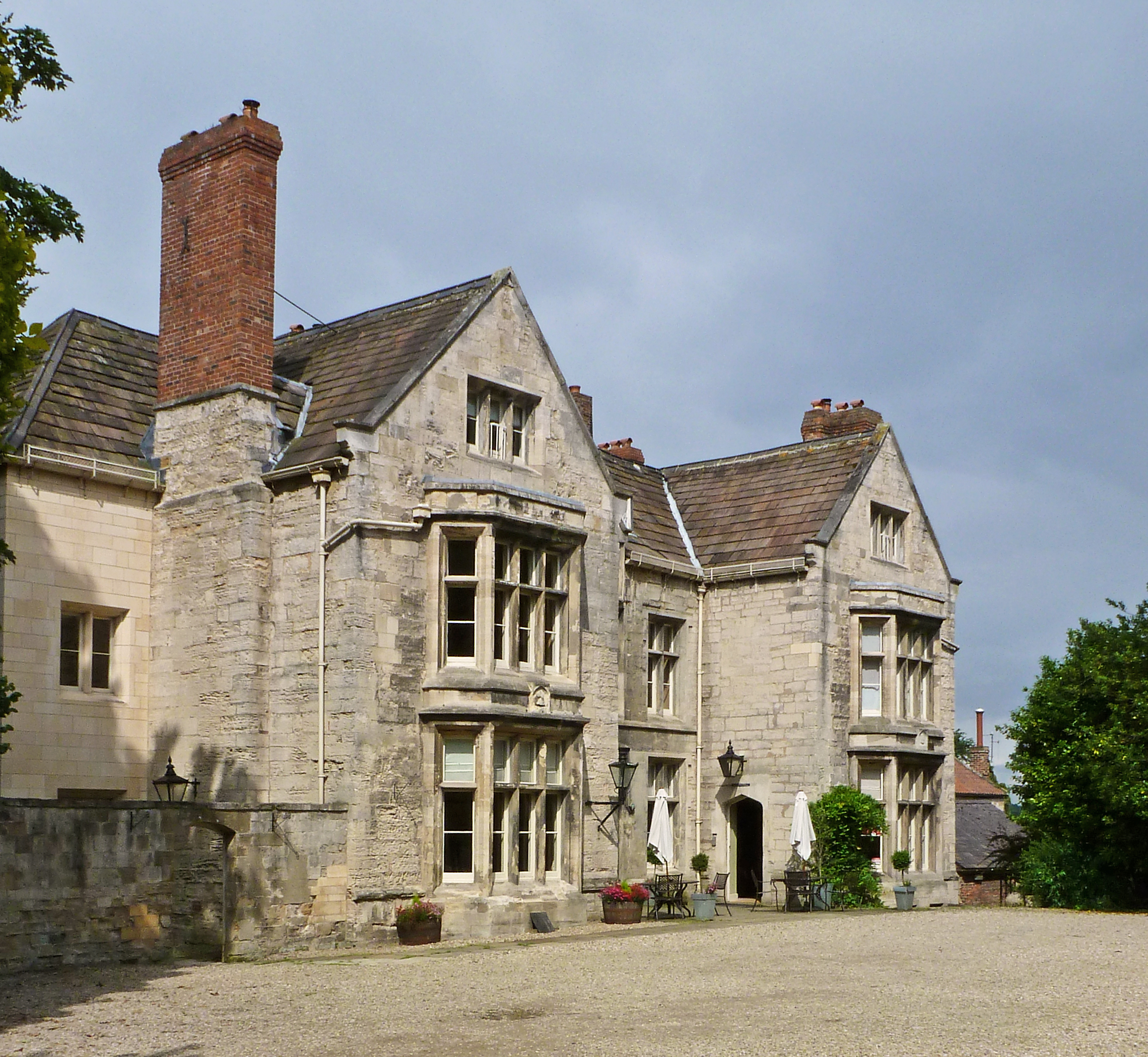
The building, in 2012

The Old Deanery is a historic building in Ripon, a city in North Yorkshire, in England.

In the Saxon period, St Wilfrid's Monastery was built, including what became Ripon Minster. The buildings to the north of the minster were cleared and replaced by the Bedern, accommodation for the vicars choral. This became disused in 1604 when James VI and I replaced the vicars choral with canons. The current building was constructed by the middle of the century, to house the Dean of Ripon. It originally had an H-shaped plan, but was extended in the rear centre in 1799. The building was altered in the 19th century, and a staircase extension was added in the early 21st century. The building has long served as a hotel, but in the 2020s it described itself as a "restaurant with rooms", and was listed in the Michelin Guide.

The building is constructed of limestone with a hipped stone slate roof. It has two storeys and attics, and three bays, flanked by projecting gabled wings with chamfered coping on cut stone kneelers. The central doorway has a four-centred arch, a two-light fanlight and a hood mould. The windows are mullioned and transomed, and there is a small gabled dormer containing an achievement and an inscription. On the wings are two-storey canted bay windows with string courses and parapets. Inside, it has a 17th-century staircase described by Historic England as "extremely fine", numerous ceilings with 17th-century plasterwork and others with plasterwork from 1799, and a couple of 18th-century fireplaces.

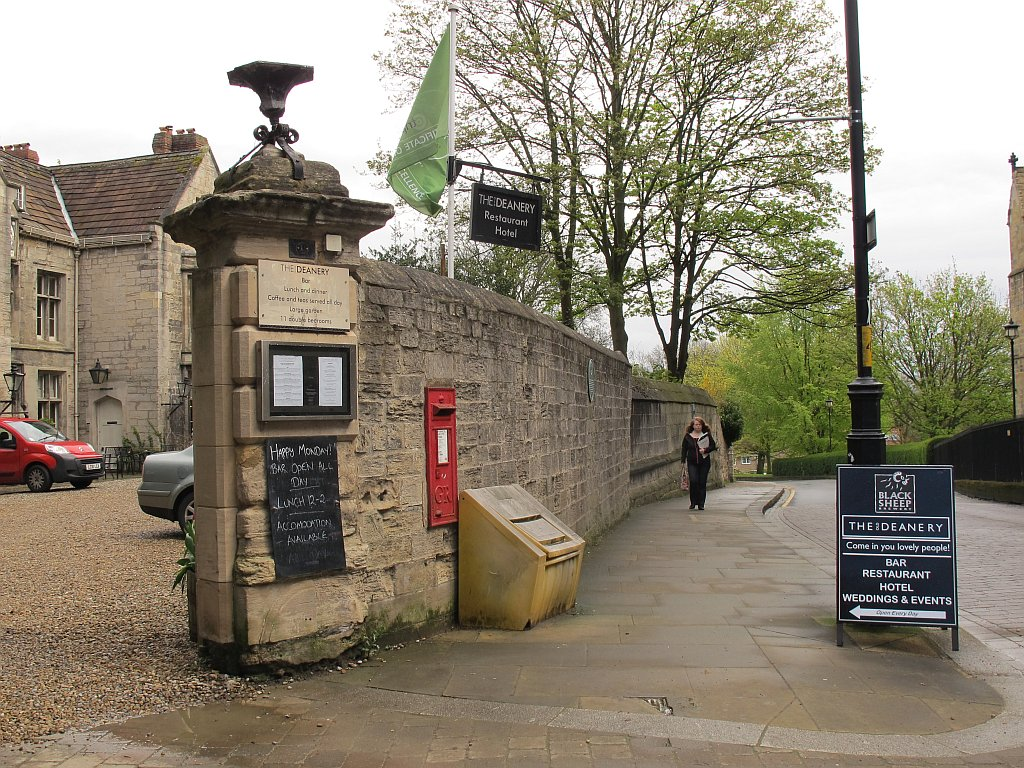
The wall in front of the building

The wall which runs along the north side of Minster Road, in front of the building, was built in about 1500 and is grade II listed. It is built of limestone, on a moulded chamfered plinth, with moulded coping. It contains a pair of gate piers with moulded cornices, a gateway with a moulded surround and a segmental cusped head, and a door with ogee panelling.

== See also ==
- Grade II* listed buildings in North Yorkshire (district)
- Listed buildings in Ripon
