= 2 King's Bench Walk =

Building in London, England

Coordinates: 51.5125°N 0.1088°W

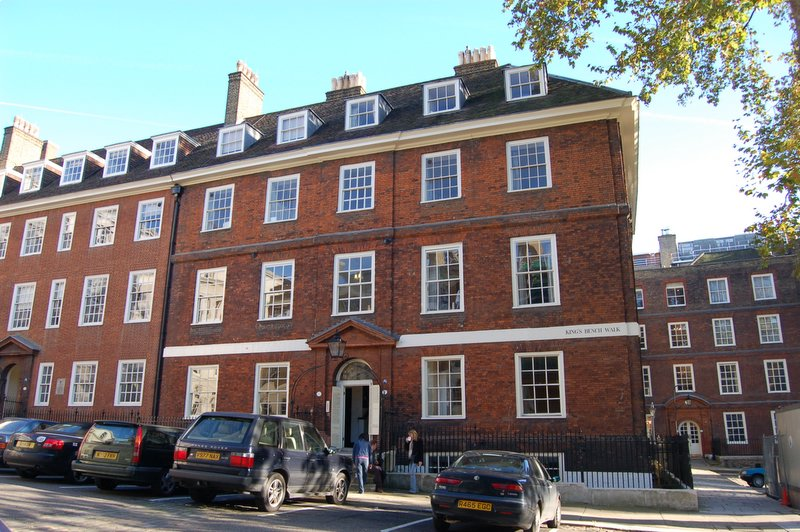
2 King's Bench Walk

2 King's Bench Walk is a Grade I listed building that houses barristers' chambers in the Inner Temple, Central London. It was designed by Sir Christopher Wren in about 1680, after the Great Fire of 1666.

The building survived the bombing of World War II, and remains as an important example of a well-proportioned seventeenth century townhouse. The corner position provides for a number of spacious dual-aspect rooms with views towards the River Thames. One of the rooms on the first floor contains a beautiful carved wooden mantelpiece together with wall panelling. The top floor continues to be used as a residence.

Various sets of barristers' chambers have existed at 2 King's Bench Walk, including a set formerly headed by Lord Campbell of Alloway QC ERD.
