= St Paul's Deanery =

Former deanery in London

- Interactive map of the St Paul's Deanery area

General information
- Type: Office
- Location: London, England
- Coordinates: 51°30′48″N 0°06′02″W
- Completed: c. 1670

Design and construction
- Architects: Traditionally Christopher Wren, more likely Edward Woodroffe

Listed Building – Grade I
- Official name: St Paul's Deanery
- Designated: 4 January 1950
- Reference no.: 1064683

St Paul's Deanery, now generally known as Deanery House, is the former deanery of St Paul's Cathedral in London. Now used as the residence of the Bishop of London, the building is a Grade I listed structure.

== History ==
The first deanery on the site existed as early as 1145, with the current building was built following the Great Fire of London around 1670. The architect is not known for certain, with the traditional claim of Christopher Wren not well documented. Other candidates include Edward Woodroffe, who provided houses at Amen Court for the canons of St Paul's. The building is Grade I listed, as well as the forecourt, screen wall, and gateway in a separate listing.

In 1977 the decision was made for the building to cease functioning as a deanery. Between 1981 and 1982 it was transformed into offices, with the Dean moving to Amen Court. Since 1996 the building has been used as the Bishop of London's palace. The Deanery is a Grade I listed building. The screen and gates enclosing the deanery forecourt have a separate Grade I listing.
