= Middle Temple =

Barristers' professional association

Honourable Society of the Middle Temple
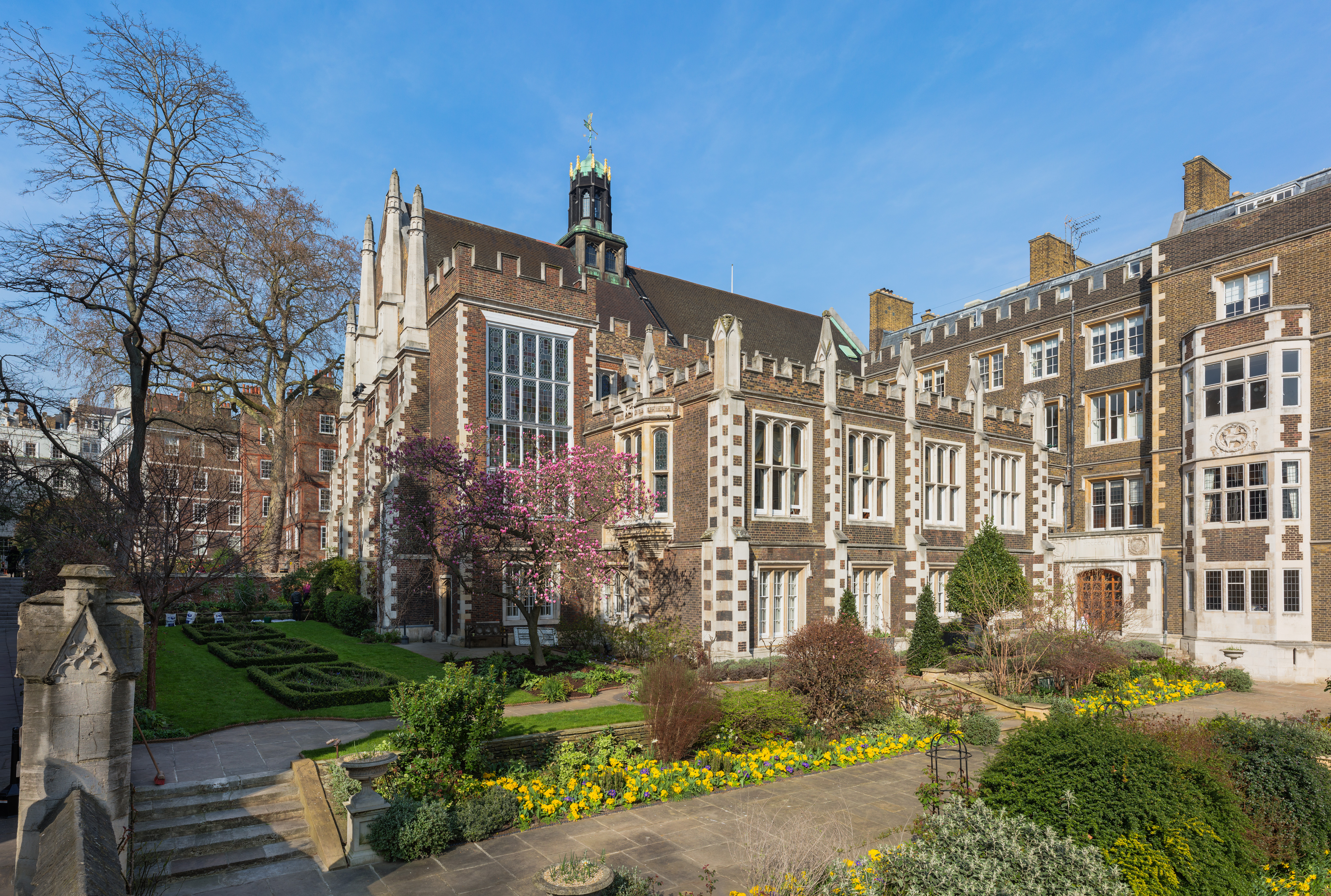
- Middle Temple Hall

General information
- Location: London, England
- Coordinates: 51.51192204511558°N 0.11134036618317555°W

Website
- https://www.middletemple.org.uk/

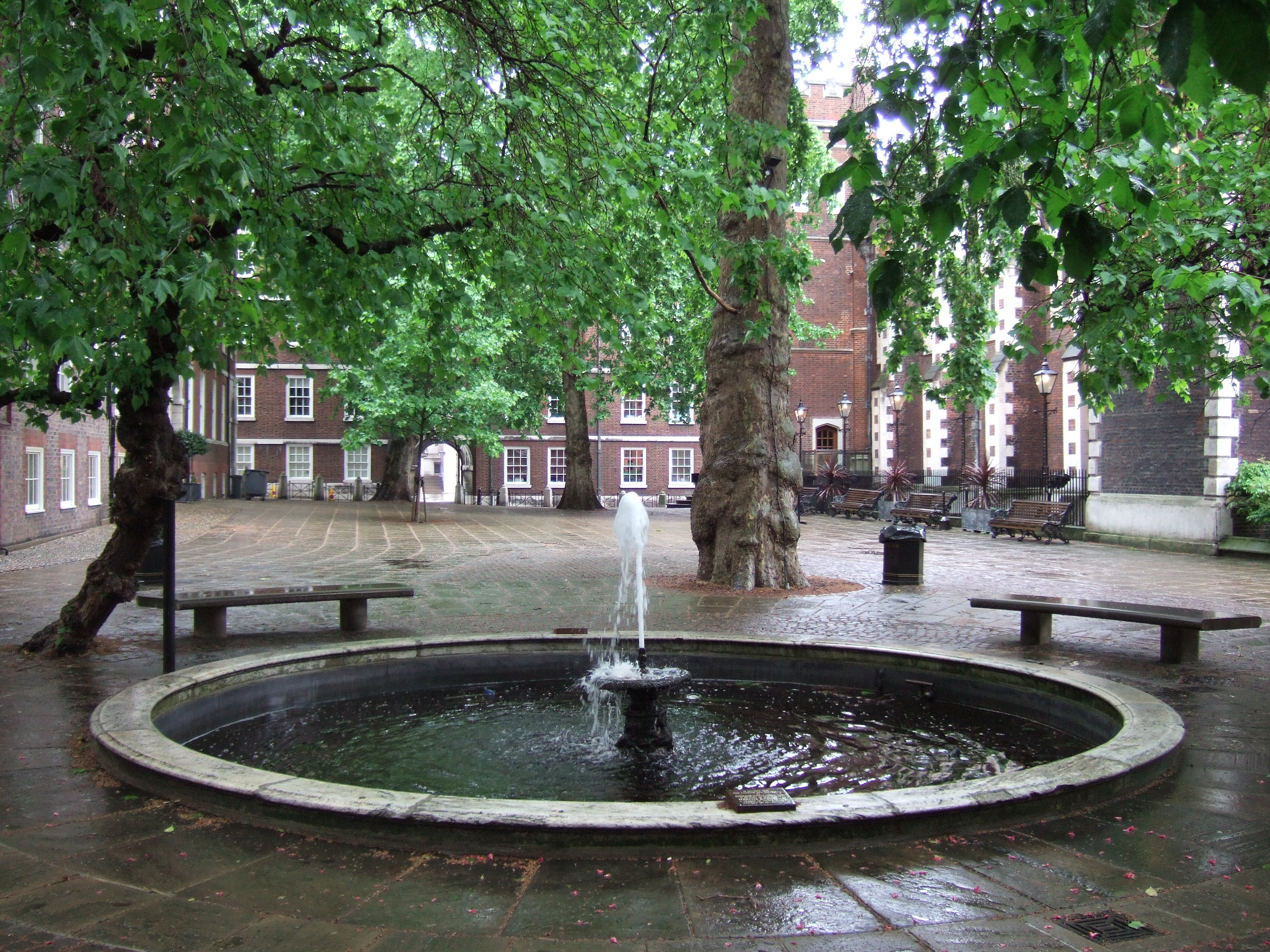
Fountain Court, at the heart of Middle Temple

The Honourable Society of the Middle Temple, commonly known simply as Middle Temple, is one of the four Inns of Court entitled to call their members to the English Bar as barristers, the others being the Inner Temple (with which it shares Temple Church), Gray's Inn and Lincoln's Inn. It is located in the wider Temple area of London, near the Royal Courts of Justice, and within the City of London. As a liberty, it functions largely as an independent local government authority.

== History ==
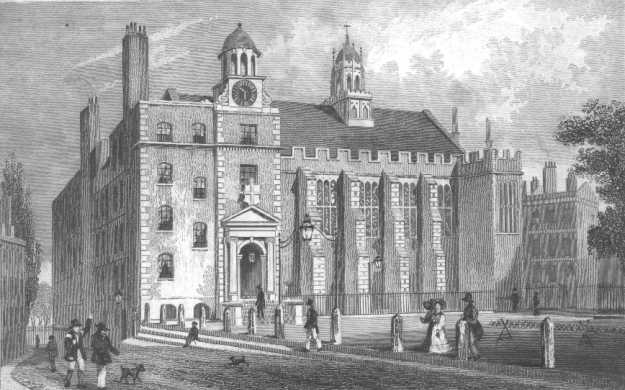
Part of Middle Temple, c. 1830, as drawn by Thomas Shepherd. The great hall is beneath the cupola.

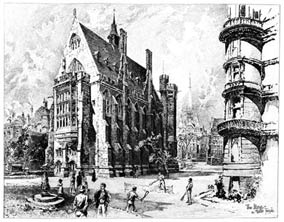
Middle Temple Library, 1892, by Herbert Railton

During the 12th and early 13th centuries the law was taught, in the City of London, primarily by the clergy. But a papal bull in 1218 prohibited the clergy from practicing in the secular courts (where the English common law system operated, as opposed to the Roman civil law favoured by the Church). As a result, law began to be practised and taught by laymen instead of by clerics. To protect their schools from competition, first Henry II and later Henry III issued proclamations prohibiting the teaching of the civil law within the City of London. The common law lawyers migrated to the hamlet of Holborn, as it was easy to get to the law courts at Westminster Hall and was just outside the City. They were based in guilds, which in time became the Inns of Court.

The Middle Temple is the western part of "The Temple", which was the headquarters of the Knights Templar until they were dissolved in 1312. There have been lawyers in the Temple since 1320, when they were the tenants of the Earl of Lancaster, who had held the Temple since 1315. The Temple later belonged to the Knights Hospitaller. In 1346 the knights again leased the premises to the lawyers – the eastern part (which became Inner Temple) to lawyers from Thavie's Inn, an Inn of Chancery in Holborn, and the western part to lawyers from St George's Inn. The Cross of St George is still part of the arms of Middle Temple today.

All of the Inn's records were burned during the Peasants' Revolt of 1381.

After Henry VIII seized the Temple from the Knights Hospitaller in 1540, each Inn continued to hold its share of the Temple as tenants of the Crown for £10 a year, until it was granted to them jointly in 1608 by James I, to be held in perpetuity so long as they continue to provide education and accommodation to lawyers and students and maintain the Temple Church and its Master. The Temple Church, consecrated in 1185, still stands as a "Royal Peculiar" (extra-diocesan) church of the Inner and Middle Temples.

Records of Fines Burnt, etc. Act 1679
- Act of Parliament
- Parliament of England
- Long title: An Act for reingrossing of the Records of Fines burnt or lost in the late Fire in the Temple.
- Citation: 31 Cha. 2. c. 3
- Territorial extent: England and Wales

Dates
- Royal assent: 27 May 1679
- Commencement: 6 March 1679 (Note: Start of session.)
- Repealed: 28 July 1863
Other legislation
Repealed by	Statute Law Revision Act 1863

Status: Repealed

Text of statute as originally enacted

Much of the Middle Temple was destroyed in a fire in January 1679, which caused more damage to the Inn than the Great Fire of 1666. The Thames being frozen over, beer from the Temple cellars was used to fight the fire, which was eventually only contained by blowing up some buildings with gunpowder. The Lord Mayor of London tried to exploit the occasion to assert his own jurisdiction over the Temple – which was independent of the City – and on being thwarted in this endeavour, he turned back a fire engine which was on its way to the fire from the City. Issues related to the destruction of records of the Office of the Chirographer of Fines of the Court of Common Pleas, held at Middle Temple, had to be resolved by an act of Parliament, the Records of Fires Burnt, etc. Act 1679 (31 Cha. 2. c. 3)

The first woman to be admitted to any Inn was Helena Florence Normanton, who joined Middle Temple as a student member on 24 December 1919. Olive Clapham, who joined Middle Temple on 17 January 1920, became the first woman to pass the bar finals examinations in May 1921.

The Temple was damaged extensively during the Blitz (1940–1944). The Library was destroyed, much of the Church was destroyed, the Master's House burned down, and the Hall was badly damaged. 112 chambers were destroyed, out of a pre-war total of 285 (39%).

The Inns served as colleges for the education of lawyers until they stopped being responsible for legal education in 1852, although they continue to provide training in areas such as advocacy and ethics for students, pupil barristers and newly qualified barristers. Most of the Inn is occupied by barristers' offices, known as barristers' chambers. One of the Middle Temple's main functions now is to provide education and support to new members of the profession. This is done through advocacy training, the provision of scholarships (over £1 million in 2011), subsidised accommodation both in the Temple and in Clapham, and by providing events where junior members may meet senior colleagues for help and advice.

In 2008 the 400th anniversary of the charter of James I was celebrated by Elizabeth II issuing new letters patent confirming the original grant.

== Buildings ==
The Middle Temple owns 43 buildings, many of which are listed buildings. The ones in the Temple itself are still held under the 1608 letters patent of James I, but some others just outside the Temple were bought subsequently. Some buildings are modern, replacing ones which were destroyed in The Blitz, but others date back to the 16th century. (There is a list here, showing the dates of construction, architect, and listed status.) The Inn is also jointly responsible, with Inner Temple, for Temple Church and the Master's House next to the church, a Georgian townhouse built in 1764.

=== The Hall ===
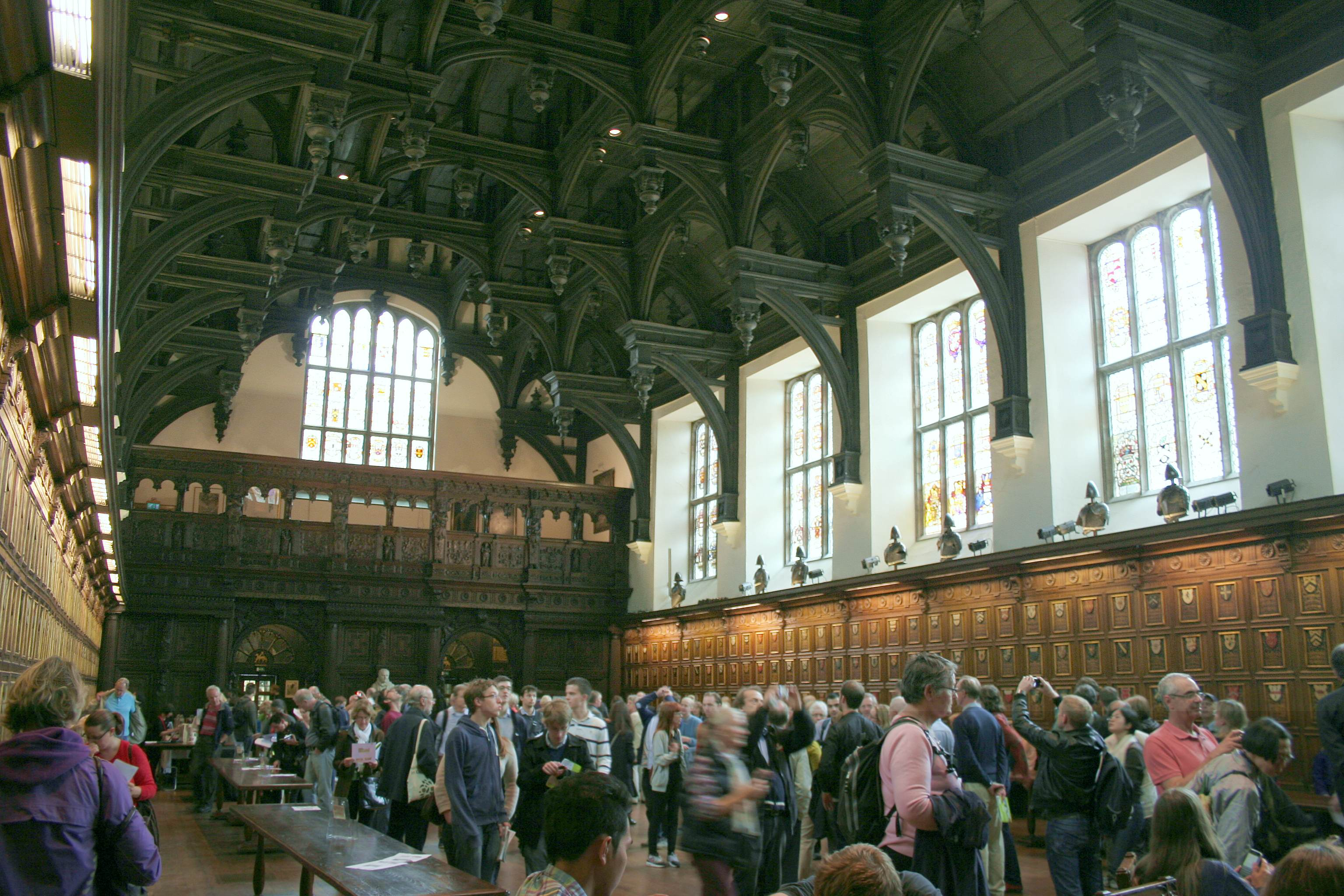
Interior of the hall and its double-hammerbeam roof

Construction of Middle Temple Hall began in 1562 and was completed in the early 1570s. Its hammerbeam roof has been said to be the best in London. Queen Elizabeth I visited the hall in 1578, unannounced, to inspect the new building and listen to a debate between barristers. This is the earliest known visit of a reigning monarch to an Inn of Court. One of the tables at the end of the hall is traditionally said to have been made from the timbers of the Golden Hinde, the ship used by Sir Francis Drake to circumnavigate the world. Above the table is a massive painting of King Charles I thought to be a copy by Peter Lely of the original by Anthony van Dyck, and also portraits of Charles II, James II, William III, Elizabeth I, Queen Anne and George I. On the walls are panels bearing the coats of arms of Readers (senior members (Note: Readers are Benchers of the Inn, who traditionally were appointed to give a 'Reading.')) dating back to 1597.

The first recorded performance of Shakespeare's play Twelfth Night occurred in the hall on 2 February 1602. Shakespeare himself was probably present.

The hall survived the Great Fire of London in 1666, but was damaged by bombing in the Second World War.

Middle Temple Hall is at the heart of the Inn, hosting several events per year for members of the Inn (and sometimes their guests), some of which also count as qualifying sessions for student members.

Middle Temple Hall is also a popular venue for banqueting, weddings, receptions and parties. In recent years, it has become a much-used film location, as has Middle Temple generally, because of its cobbled streets, historic buildings and gas lighting.

=== Library ===
Little is known about the original library, which was probably just a room in a barristers' chambers. All the books were stolen prior to the reign of Henry VIII. In 1625 a new library was established at the site of what is now Garden Court, and in 1641 it was enlarged when a member of the Inn, Robert Ashley, died and left his collection of books and £300 to the Inn. This library was demolished in 1830. After an interval of three decades, a new library was built, in a Gothic style designed by architect H. R. Abraham. It was opened by The Prince of Wales on 31 October 1861. This Victorian library was badly damaged during the London Blitz in 1940, and was demolished following the war. A new Library was constructed in the 1950s to a design by Edward Maufe and opened by the Queen Mother in 1958. The building still houses the Inn's library and archives as well as various administrative offices, and is now known as the Ashley Building.

Middle Temple Library possesses Emery Molyneux's terrestrial and celestial globes, which are of particular historical cartographical value.

=== Gatehouse ===
The present gatehouse, on Fleet Street on the northern boundary of the Inn, was built in 1684 by Sir Christopher Wren. It replaced an earlier one which had been allowed to decay until it had to be demolished. It leads into Middle Temple Lane, which proceeds southwards through the Inn to end at gates on the Victoria Embankment, south of the Temple. All of the buildings in the Temple lying west of the lane belong to Middle Temple; the buildings to the east belong to one Inn or the other.

=== Chambers ===
==== West of Middle Temple Lane ====
Proceeding south from the Fleet Street gatehouse, Middle Temple Lane passes Brick Court to the west, so called because it is said to consist of the first brick buildings to be built in the Temple, in the reign of Elizabeth I. Sir William Blackstone worked here before becoming the first professor to lecture in law at Oxford University. The poet and playwright Oliver Goldsmith also lived here from 1765 (having earlier resided in Garden Court), and is buried in the Temple Church. Blackstone, living on the floor below Goldsmith's chambers, complained about the noise made by Goldsmith's raucous parties, which were attended by many celebrities of the time, including Samuel Johnson. Blackstone later moved to Pump Court; whether because of the parties or for some other reason is unknown.

Next to Brick Court are the buildings called Essex Court, which actually form part of the same courtyard. The earliest record of Essex Court is from 1640, but the original buildings were replaced in 1656 and 1677. Today Essex Court and Brick Court are occupied by barristers' chambers. Through a passageway to the west is New Court, built by Wren, and a gate leading out of the Temple into Devereux Court and Essex Street. (Another passageway to the north leads through Outer Temple to Fleet Street.)

South of New Court and Essex Court lies Fountain Court. The fountain there was described by Charles Dickens in Martin Chuzzlewit. In her notes to her poem The Middle Temple Gardens, Letitia Elizabeth Landon says of it: 'it is the poetry of the place, or, rather, the voice of the poetry with which it is filled'. To the south of Fountain Court are, from west to east, Garden Court (where the old library used to be), Middle Temple Gardens (which extend to the southern perimeter of the Temple), and Middle Temple Hall. The current buildings of Garden Court, which lie along the western edge of the Temple, were constructed in 1883. South of Garden Court are Blackstone House, Queen Elizabeth Building, and a gate leading out of the Temple (and a short distance from Temple tube station).

South of the hall, and east of the gardens, are Plowden Buildings, built in 1831, which contain the Treasurer's office. South of that is the current library, and then, at the end of Middle Temple Lane, are the buildings called Temple Gardens, built on both sides of the lane by both Inns in 1861. The western part belongs to Middle Temple, and the eastern part is Inner Temple's. The lane passes through the middle of Temple Gardens via an archway and leads out of the Temple.

==== East of the lane ====
Along the east side of Middle Temple Lane (proceeding northwards from the southern archway), the buildings belong to Inner Temple, until the lane reaches Lamb Buildings. Lamb Buildings belong to Middle Temple, which bought the land from Inner Temple after the Great Fire of 1666. Inner Temple needed the money because it found itself short of funds due to the extensive property destruction. Lamb Buildings are built on the site of Caesar's Buildings, which were destroyed in the fire, and which had belonged to Inner Temple. The Lamb of God is the symbol of Middle Temple and is engraved above the entrances to the building.

Behind Lamb Buildings, further east, is Elm Court, built in 1880. The buildings on the south and east sides of Elm Court are part of Inner Temple; the west and north buildings are Middle Temple. Further north is Pump Court, one of the oldest courts in the Temple. Most of the buildings here belong to Middle Temple, except those in the north west corner. Further east are Middle Temple's cloisters, leading to Church Court between Temple Church and Inner Temple Hall. North of Pump Court is Inner Temple's Hare Court and then more buildings belonging to Middle Temple, until the lane ends at the gate to Fleet Street.

Parallel with and to the east of Middle Temple Lane lies Inner Temple Lane, which runs from Fleet Street to Church Court. On the east side of Inner Temple Lane, and opposite Hare Court, is Goldsmith Building, so named because of its proximity to Goldsmith's tomb in the adjacent Temple Church. Despite its location in the Inner Temple, Goldsmith Building actually belongs to Middle Temple, for reasons which are no longer remembered. It was built in 1861.

== Structure and governance ==
The Inn's supreme body is its Parliament, which is made up of the Benchers (judges and senior barristers), who are elected for life, and headed by the Treasurer who is elected annually. Parliament approves the Inn's budget and authorises Call of qualified student members to the Bar. Members of the British royal family who are made honorary benchers are known as "Royal Benchers". The first of these was the Prince of Wales, later Edward VII, who was made a Royal Bencher when he opened the newly constructed library in 1861.

The Inn is run from day to day by an Executive Committee and five Standing Committees, which are accountable to the Parliament. The Executive Committee consists of nine voting members (including the Treasurer and the Deputy Treasurer) and six non-voting members (including the Under Treasurer).

The Treasurer for 2026 is Bernard Richmond KC. The Chief Executive and Under Treasurer is Major-General Sir Christopher Ghika KCVO CBE.

The Inn's property is vested in four Trustees appointed by the Inn's Parliament.

=== Liberty ===
Middle Temple (like the Inner Temple) is one of the few remaining liberties, an old name for a geographic division. It is an independent extra-parochial area, historically not governed by the City of London Corporation (and is today regarded as a local authority for most purposes) and equally outside the ecclesiastical jurisdiction of the Bishop of London. The Middle Temple's functions as a local council are set out in the Temples Order 1971.

It geographically falls within the boundaries and wards of the City.

Some of the Inn's buildings (those along Essex Street, Devereux Court and the Queen Elizabeth Building near the Embankment) lie just outside the liberty of the Middle Temple and the City's boundary, and are actually situated in the City of Westminster. Quadrant House (7–15 Fleet Street) was acquired by the Middle Temple in 1999, and after five years of conversion is now a barristers' chambers. This lies outside the liberty (though immediately adjacent to it) but is within the City of London.

=== Badge and coat of arms ===
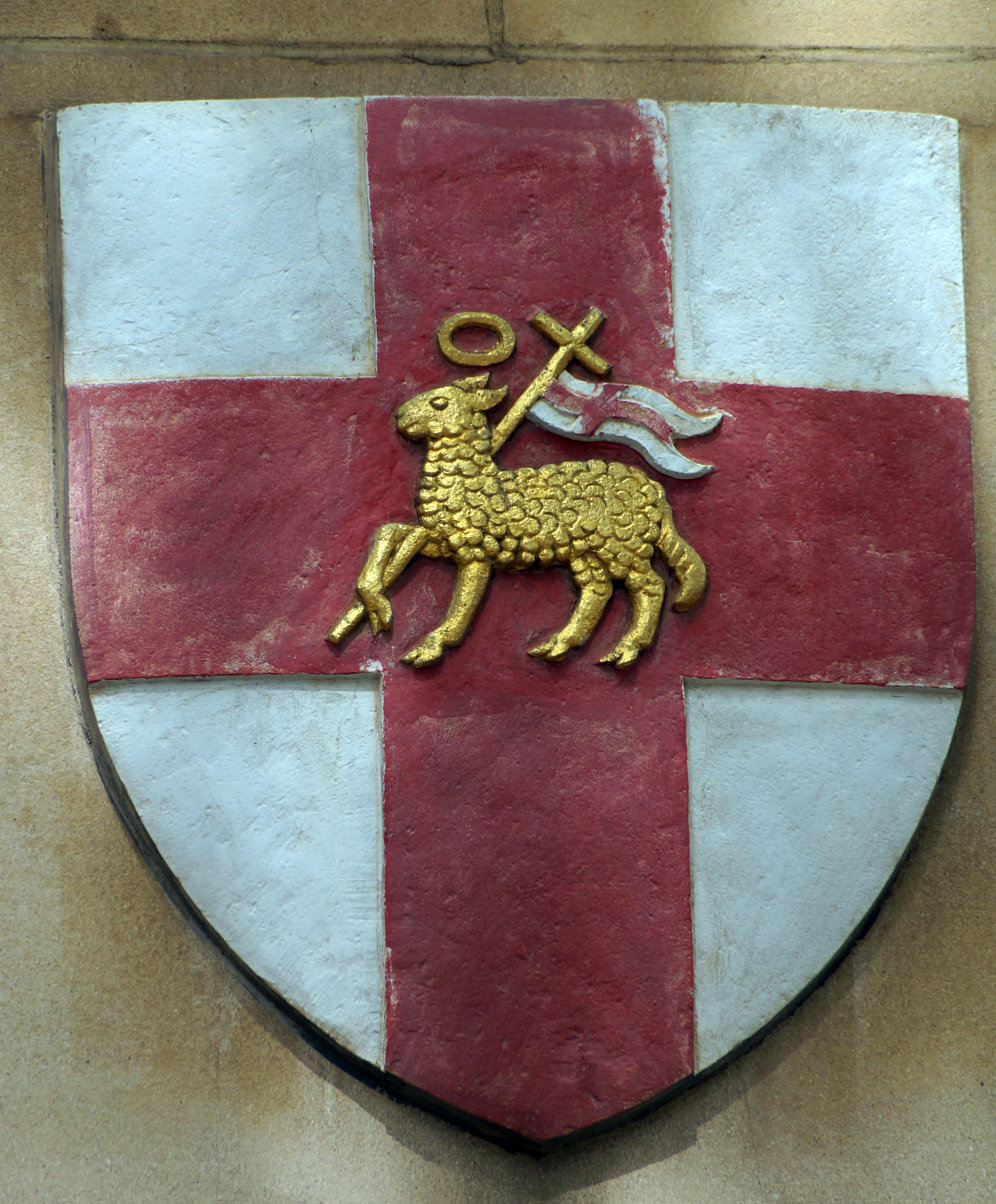
Coat of arms

The badge of the Middle Temple consists of the Lamb of God carrying a flag bearing the Saint George's Cross. This symbol appears in the centre of the Inn's coat of arms, against a background consisting of the same cross (a red cross on a white field). The cross, and the lamb with the flag, each were symbols of the Knights Templar.

== Qualifying sessions ==
The Inn's student members are required to attend a minimum of 10 qualifying sessions, 6 of which must be attended in person, either at the Inn or "on circuit" (outside London). Qualifying sessions, formerly known as "dinners", combine collegiate and educational elements and will usually combine a dinner or reception with lectures, debates, mooting, or musical performances, often taking place in The Hall.

== Notable members ==
- Sir Edmund Plowden, English lawyer
- William Byrd II, American lawyer and author
- Sir John Popham, Lord Chief Justice of England
- Sir Walter Raleigh, English statesman and author
- Arthur Onslow, English politician
- John Evelyn, English writer
- Sir William Blackstone, English jurist
- Charles Dickens, English writer
- Thomas Morris Chester, American lawyer and soldier
- Vallabhbhai Patel, Indian statesman and barrister
- Qazi Muhammad Isa, Pakistani statesman and barrister
- Chittaranjan Das, Indian lawyer
- Birendranath Sasmal, Indian independence activist and barrister
- Geoffrey Howe, British politician
- Ratu Sir Lala Sukuna, Fijian statesman and soldier
- John Rutledge, Chief Justice of the US Supreme Court and Governor of South Carolina
- Lee Kwan Yew, Barrister and former prime minister of Singapore
- Keir Starmer, former prime minister of the United Kingdom

=== Royal benchers ===
- The Prince of Wales (later Edward VII) (1861; served as Treasurer in 1866) (Note: The Prince's appointment as Treasurer was honorary, and the office's functions were performed by the Deputy Treasurer.)
- Prince Albert Victor, Duke of Clarence and Avondale (1885)
- The Prince of Wales (later Edward VIII) (1919)
- Queen Elizabeth The Queen Mother (1944)
- Diana, Princess of Wales (1988)
- Prince William (later Prince of Wales) (2009)

=== Other honorary benchers ===
- William Howard Taft (1922), US chief justice and president
- Anthony Eden (1952), prime minister
- Harold Macmillan (1958), prime minister
- Warren E. Burger (1971), US chief justice
- Lord Denning (1972), master of the rolls
- Sadiq Khan (2019), Mayor of London

== See also ==
- List of members of Middle Temple
