= Barristers' chambers =

Offices used by barristers

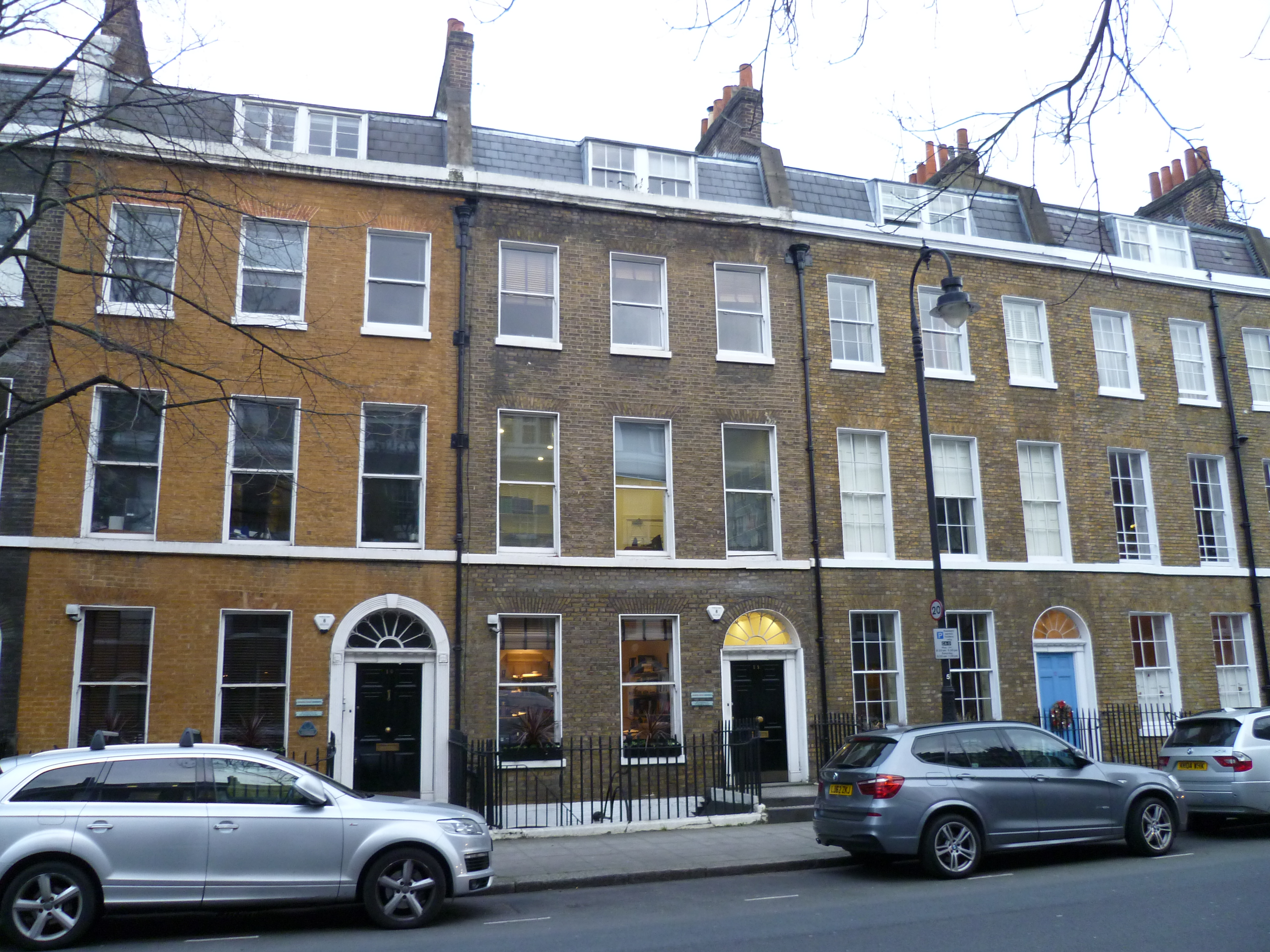
Doughty Street Chambers, a set of barristers' chambers in England

In law, a barrister's chambers or barristers' chambers are the rooms used by a barrister or a group of barristers. The singular refers to the use by a sole practitioner whereas the plural refers to a group of barristers who, while acting as sole practitioners, share costs and expenses for office overheads.

== Description ==
In England and Wales, New Zealand, Australia, India, Pakistan, Sri Lanka, and Hong Kong, chambers may refer to the office premises used by a barrister or to a group of barristers, especially in the Inns of Court. In these jurisdictions, barristers are forbidden from forming or becoming partners in law firms (though they may be employed by them) and (except for those employed by a law firm or by a government agency) are theoretically all sole practitioners. However, to share costs and expenses, barristers typically operate fraternally with each other as unincorporated associations known as "chambers".

The term "chambers" is used to refer both to the physical premises where the barristers' set conduct most of their work from, as well as the 'set' or unincorporated association itself.

Chambers typically have office spaces for the barristers to work from, conference rooms with infrastructure to conduct video conferencing for a large audience, printing and photocopying sections, a substantially large and updated library, and rooms for the barristers' and clients' dining and entertainment.

Most chambers have a staff to look after administrative matters, including a fully-fledged kitchen and dining hall to serve up meals and refreshments. The transactional side of chambers are administered by barristers' clerks who receive cases from solicitors and agree on matters such as fees on behalf of their employers; they then provide case details to the barristers and conduct office management for them. Some chambers specialise in particular areas of law. Members are known as tenants and may be dismissed only for gross misconduct.

There are chambers all over England and Wales; however, the largest concentration of them is in London. A report by the General Council of the Bar in 2006 showed that of the 355 practising chambers in the United Kingdom, 210 were based in London.

In Hong Kong, the 133 chambers within the special administrative region are almost exclusively located in the City of Victoria. In Sri Lanka, counsels would maintain their chambers at their residence, which serve as their office and contain their personal library.
