= 1998 New Year Honours =

British royal recognitions

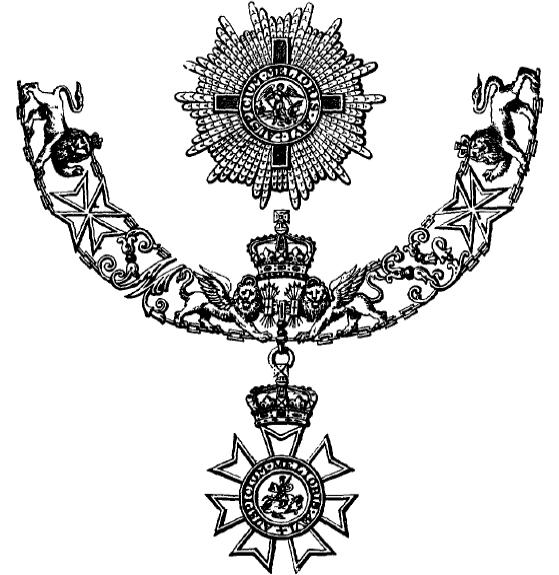
The insignia of the Grand Cross of the Order of St Michael and St George

The New Year Honours 1998 for the United Kingdom, Barbados, Grenada, Papua New Guinea, the Solomon Islands, Tuvalu, Saint Vincent and the Grenadines, Belize, Antigua and Barbuda, and Saint Christopher and Nevis were announced on 30 December 1997, to celebrate the year passed and mark the beginning of 1998. The New Year Honours for New Zealand were announced on 31 December 1997.

The Honours list is a list of people who have been awarded one of the various orders, decorations, and medals of the United Kingdom. Honours are split into classes ("orders") and are graded to distinguish different degrees of achievement or service, most medals are not graded. The awards are presented to the recipient in one of several investiture ceremonies at Buckingham Palace throughout the year by the Sovereign or her designated representative. The Prince of Wales (now Charles III) and The Princess Royal deputised for The Queen.

In the United Kingdom, the orders, medals and decorations are awarded by various Honours Committees which meet to discuss candidates identified by public or private bodies, by government departments or who are nominated by members of the public. Depending on their roles, those people selected by committee are submitted either to the prime minister, Foreign Secretary, or Secretary of State for Defence for their approval before being sent to the Sovereign for final approval. As the "fount of honour" the monarch remains the final arbiter for awards. In the case of certain orders such as the Order of the Garter and the Royal Victorian Order they remain at the personal discretion of the Queen.

The recipients of honours are displayed here as they were styled before their new honour, and arranged by honour, with classes (Knight, Knight Grand Cross, etc.) and then divisions (Military, Civil, etc.) as appropriate.

== United Kingdom ==
=== Life Peers ===
- Sir Frederick Edward Robin Butler, GCB CVO, Secretary of the Cabinet and Head of the Home Civil Service.
- Sir Ronald Ernest Dearing, CB, Chairman, National Committee of Inquiry into Higher Education.
- Paul Bertrand Hamlyn, CBE, Publisher.
- The Right Reverend David Stuart Sheppard, lately Bishop of Liverpool.

=== Privy Counsellors ===
- William David Trimble, MP, Member of Parliament for Upper Bann and Leader, Ulster Unionist Party.

=== Knights Bachelor ===
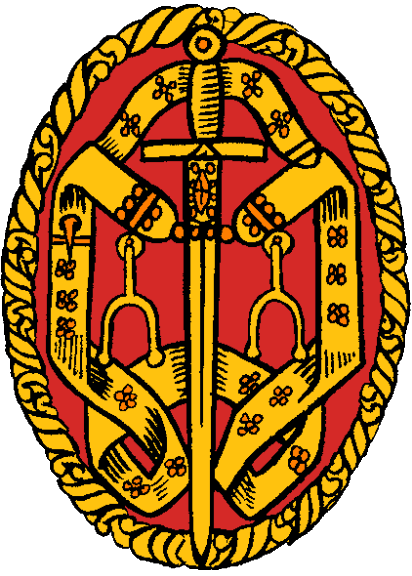
The insignia of a Knight Bachelor

- Professor John Peebles Arbuthnott, Principal, University of Strathclyde. For services to Higher Education.
- Peter Gilmour Noto Badge, lately Chief Metropolitan Stipendiary Magistrate.
- Frank Barlow, CBE. For services to the Newspaper Industry.
- Richard Rodney Bennett, CBE, Composer. For services to Music.
- Professor Michael John Berridge, FRS, Head, Laboratory of Molecular Signalling, Babraham Institute. For services to Science.
- Professor Alec Nigel Broers, FRS. For services to Engineering Education.
- George Jeffrey Bull, Chairman, Grand Metropolitan plc. For services to the Alcoholic Drinks Industry.
- John Gordon Thomas Carter, Chief Executive, Commercial Union Group and Chairman, Association of British Insurers. For services to the Insurance Industry.
- Professor Alfred Cuschieri, Professor of Surgery, University of Dundee. For services to Minimal Access Surgery.
- Thomas Finney, CBE, For services to Association Football.
- Terence Ernest Manitou Frost, Painter. For services to Art and to Art Education.
- Michael John Gambon, CBE, Actor. For services to Drama.
- Leslie Geoffrey Hampton, Head Teacher, Northicote School, Wolverhampton. For services to Education.
- Brian Hayes, CBE, QPM, Deputy Commissioner, Metropolitan Police. For services to the Police.
- Graham James Hearne, CBE, Chairman, Enterprise Oil. For services to the Oil Industry.
- Elton Hercules John, CBE, Musician and Composer. For services to Music and for charitable services.
- Peter Machin North, CBE, QC, Principal, Jesus College, Oxford. For Public Service and services to International Law.
- Professor John Ridley Pattison, Dean, University College London Medical School and Chair, Spongiform Encepalopathy Advisory Committee. For services to Medicine.
- Dennis Pettit, Leader, Nottinghamshire County Council. For services to Local Government and to the community in Nottinghamshire.
- Neville Ian Simms, Group Chief Executive and Deputy Chairman, Tarmac plc. For services to the Construction Industry.
- Major General Michael Edward Carleton-Smith, CBE, DL, lately Director General, Marie Curie Cancer Care. For services to Cancer Care.
- Norman Brian Smith, CBE, Non-executive Chairman, Cable and Wireless plc and BAA plc. For services to Industry and to the community.
- Edwin Barrie Stephens, Chairman, Siebe plc. For services to the Engineering Industry.
- Henry Dennistoun Stevenson, CBE, Chairman, GPA plc and Pearson plc. For services to Business and to the Arts.
- Professor Colin Alexander St. John Wilson. For services to Architecture.

Diplomatic Service and Overseas List

- Professor Derek William Bowett, CBE, QC, lately Member, International Law Commission.
- Dr. Arthur Charles Clarke, CBE. For services to literature.

=== Order of the Bath ===
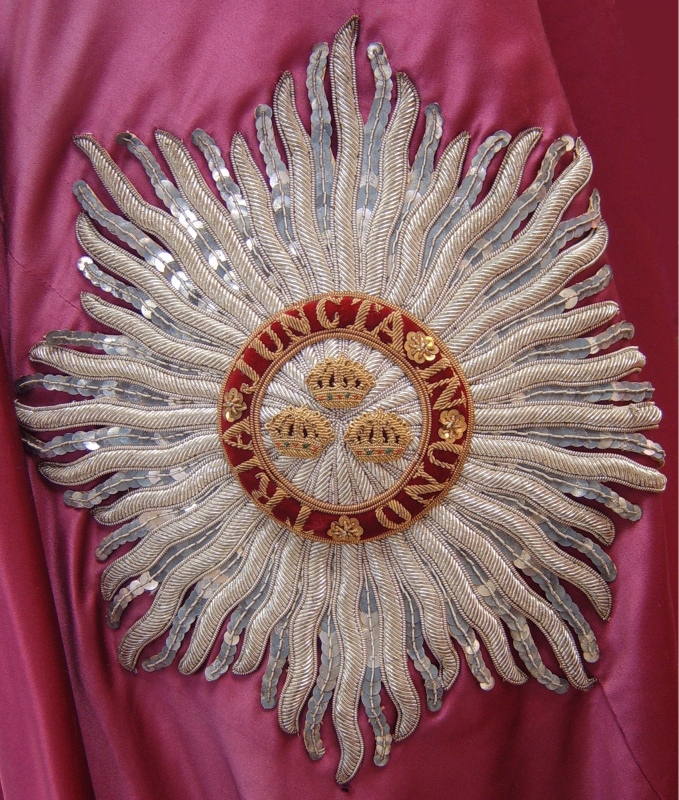
Representation of the star of the Order of the Bath (civil division).

The Most Honourable Order of the Bath is the fourth-most senior of the British Orders of Chivalry with three classes of member.

==== Knights Grand Cross (GCB) ====
Civil Division

- Sir John Anthony Chilcot, KCB, lately Permanent Secretary, Northern Ireland Office.
- The Right Honourable Sir Robert Fellowes, GCVO, KCB, Private Secretary to The Queen and Keeper of The Queen's Archives.

==== Knights Commander (KCB) ====
Military Division

- Vice Admiral John Hugh Dunt.
- Air Marshal Anthony John Crowther Bagnall, CB OBE, Royal Air Force.

Civil Division

- Richard Clive Mottram, Permanent Secretary, Ministry of Defence.
- Gerald Hayden Phillips, CB, Permanent Secretary, Department for Culture, Media and Sport.

==== Companions (CB) ====
Military Division

- Vice Admiral Michael Peter Gretton.
- Rear Admiral David John Wood.
- Major General Jonathan Michael Francis Cooper Hall, OBE, (480320), late The Royal Scots Dragoon Guards.
- Major General William John Pherrick Robins, OBE, (469087), late Royal Corps of Signals.
- Major General Charles Gerard Courtenay Vyvyan, CBE, (484776), late The Royal Green Jackets.
- Air Vice-Marshal David Anthony Hurrell, AFC, Royal Air Force.
- Air Vice-Marshal Peter Millar, Royal Air Force.

Civil Division

- Geoffrey Hubert Bush, Director General, Resources and Planning, Her Majesty's Board of Inland Revenue.
- Richard John Derek Garden, Head, Food Safety and Environment Directorate, Ministry of Agriculture, Fisheries and Food.
- Romola Carol Andrea Christopherson, Director of Press and Publicity, Department of Health.
- David Lovell Foot, Forestry Commissioner, Forestry Commission.
- Brian Michael Fox, Director, Senior Civil Service Group, Cabinet Office (Office of Public Service).
- James Hamill, Head, Home Department, Scottish Office.
- Julian David Hansen, lately Band 7, Ministry of Defence.
- Samuel Alexander Harbison, HM Chief Inspector of Nuclear Installations and Director of Nuclear Safety, Health and Safety Executive.
- John Clive Hedger, Director of Operations, Department for Education and Employment.
- Professor Julian Charles Roland Hunt, FRS, lately Chief Executive, Meteorological Office.
- James Dennis Maines, lately Director General, Command Information Systems, Ministry of Defence.
- Ronald Noel Martin. For public service.
- Michael Lewis Whippman, Policy Director, Department of Social Security.
- Charles Boniface Winnifrith, Clerk of Committees, House of Commons.
- Andrew William Saunders, Director, Communications-Electronics Security Group.

=== Order of St Michael and St George ===
Representation of the star of a Knight or Dame Grand Cross

The Most Distinguished Order of St Michael and St George is an order of chivalry used to honour individuals who have rendered important services in relation to Commonwealth or foreign nations.

==== Knights Commander (KCMG) ====
- The Most Reverend Archbishop Ernest Urban Trevor Huddleston. For services to UK–South African relations.
- Paul Lever, CMG, lately Deputy Under-Secretary of State, Foreign and Commonwealth Office.
- Christopher John Rome Meyer, CMG lately HM Ambassador, Bonn.

==== Companions (CMG) ====
- Anthony Hubert Male. For services to the Central Bureau for Educational Visits and Exchanges.
- Professor Norman Myers. For services to the Environment.
- Robert Daglish Smith, Executive Director, UK Committee for UNICEF. For services to UNICEF.
- Jonathan Sidney Spencer Beels, Counsellor, Foreign and Commonwealth Office.
- Kenneth Anthony Bishop, OBE, Counsellor, Foreign and Commonwealth Office.
- Alan Stanley Collins, Director General, British Trade and Cultural Office, Taipei.
- Charles Graham Crawford, HM Ambassador, Sarajevo.
- Nigel Kim Darroch, lately Counsellor, Foreign and Commonwealth Office.
- Joseph Brian Donnelly, lately Minister and Deputy Permanent UK Representative, North Atlantic Council.
- William Geoffrey Ehrman, lately Principal Private Secretary to the Secretary of State for Foreign and Commonwealth Affairs.
- Dr. Abraham Sek-Tong Lue, MBE, Member of the Executive, Great Britain-China Centre.
- Ralph Murphy, Counsellor, Foreign and Commonwealth Office.
- Tom Richard Vaughan Phillips, lately Counsellor, HM Embassy, Washington.
- Douglas Scrafton, lately HM Ambassador, Sana'a.

=== Royal Victorian Order ===
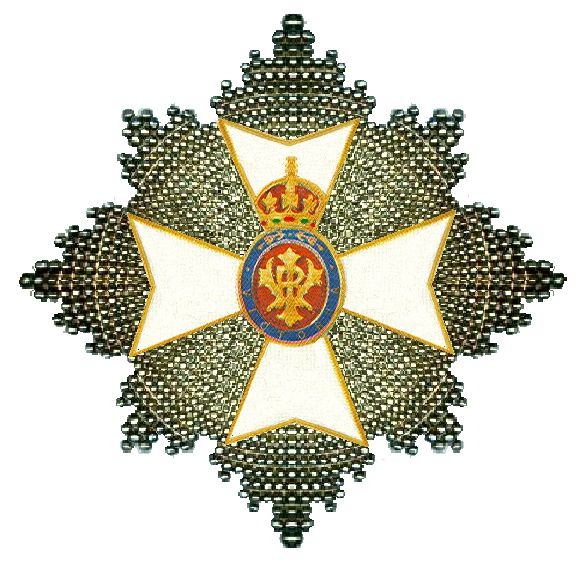
Breast Star of the Grand Cross of the Royal Victorian Order

The Royal Victorian Order is a dynastic order of knighthood and a house order of chivalry recognising distinguished personal service to the reigning monarch of the Commonwealth realms; admission remains in the personal gift of the monarch.

==== Knights Commander (KCVO) ====
- Robin Berry Janvrin, CB CVO, Deputy Private Secretary to The Queen.
- Lieutenant Colonel John St. Aubyn Parker, The Earl of Morley, Lord Lieutenant of Devon.
- Michael Charles Gerrard Peat, CVO, Keeper of the Privy Purse and Treasurer to the Queen.
- Allen John George, Baron Sheppard of Didgemere, lately Chairman of Business in the Community.
- Colonel Sir John Vernon Wills, TD, Lord Lieutenant of Somerset and former Lord Lieutenant of Avon.

==== Commanders (CVO) ====
- Charles Roderick Curwen, LVO OBE, Official Secretary, Office of the Governor of Victoria, Australia.
- Brigadier Miles Garth Hunt-Davis, CBE, Private Secretary to The Duke of Edinburgh.
- Giles Patrick Stretton Downes, Partner, Sidell Gibson Partnership. For services in connection with the restoration of the fire damage at Windsor Castle.
- Susan Richenda, The Lady Elton, Lady in Waiting to The Queen.
- Diana Marion, The Lady Farnham, Lady in Waiting to The Queen.
- Colonel Thomas Armitage Hall, OBE, Lieutenant, Body Guard of the Honourable Corps of Gentlemen at Arms.
- Lieutenant Colonel Anthony Charles McClure Mather, OBE, Secretary, Central Chancery of the Orders of Knighthood and Assistant Comptroller, Lord Chamberlain's Office.
- Robert James Maxwell, CBE, lately Secretary and Chief Executive of The King's Fund.
- Malcolm Cyril Pinchin, lately Trustee of The Duke of Edinburgh's Award.
- Hugh Ashley Roberts, LVO, Director of the Royal Collection and Surveyor of the Queen's Works of Art.

==== Lieutenants (LVO) ====
- Commander Jeremy Jonathan Frank Blunden, HM Yacht Britannia.
- Ivor John Dicker, Solicitor to the Duchy of Lancaster.
- Alan John Frost, Director, Donald Insall Associates. For services in connection with the restoration of the fire damage at Windsor Castle.
- Michael Edward Stanley Gibbins, Comptroller to Diana, Princess of Wales.
- Simon Alan Jones, Managing Director, Gardiner & Theobald Management Services. For services in connection with the restoration of the fire damage at Windsor Castle.
- Commander Simon Charles Martin, HM Yacht Britannia.
- Brian Walter Money, lately Head of Royal Matters Unit, Foreign and Commonwealth Office.
- Martin Gerard James Neary, Organist and Master of the Choristers, Westminster Abbey. For services in connection with the funeral of the late Diana, Princess of Wales.
- Caroline Anne Nunneley, Lady in Waiting to The Princess Royal.
- Claudia Ann Wyndham Payne, MVO, lately Secretary to the Secretary and Keeper of the Records of the Duchy of Cornwall.

==== Members (MVO) ====
- Lilian Joyce Amelia Burfield, Couture Fitter, Hardy Amies Limited.
- Captain David Charles Cole, HM Yacht Britannia.
- Hazel Margaret Dunlop, Assistant Property Administrator, the Royal Household.
- Robert Eric Evans, QPM, lately Chairman of the North Wales Committee of The Prince's Trust.
- Lettice Jones, Secretary to the Chapter Clerk, College of St. George, Windsor.
- Margaret Audrey Moore, Secretary to the Lord Chamberlain.
- Brian Neal, Gentleman of the Chapel Royal Choir, Windsor Great Park.
- Stephen James Patterson, Computer Systems Manager, the Royal Collection.
- Philip Rowley, Site Manager, Higgs & Hill Special Contracts Ltd. For services in connection with the restoration of the fire damage at Windsor Castle.
- George Edmund Gordon-Smith, Clerk to the Lieutenancy of Greater London.
- Richard William Lowestoft Smith, lately Honorary Treasurer, Chapel Royal, St. James's Palace.
- Christopher Michael Watson, Project Manager, Gardiner & Theobald Management Services. For services in connection with the restoration of the fire damage at Windsor Castle.
- Inspector Kenneth Ansley Wharfe, Royalty Protection Department, Metropolitan Police.
- Warrant Officer Robert Ernest White, HM Yacht Britannia.

=== Royal Victorian Medal ===
==== Gold ====
- Alexander Webster, RVM, Head Gardener, the Castle of Mey.

==== Bar to Silver ====
- Mary Doran, RVM, Housemaid to Queen Elizabeth The Queen Mother.
- David Malcolm Groves, RVM, lately Manager of the Reprographic Unit.
- Michael Perry, RVM, Valet to The Duke of York.

==== Silver ====
- Petty Officer Michael John Bennett, HM Yacht Britannia.
- Tonino Bonici, Palace Foreman, Buckingham Palace.
- Leading Seaman Patrick Bryan Caws, HM Yacht Britannia.
- Petty Officer Gary Edward Charman, HM Yacht Britannia.
- Sidney Charles Clarke, Chauffeur, Leverton and Sons Ltd. For services in connection with the funeral of Diana, Princess of Wales.
- George Bernard Clough, Decorator, Hare & Humphreys Ltd. For services in connection with the restoration of the fire damage at Windsor Castle.
- Philip Roland Elliott, Foreman, Fencing and Engineering Department, Crown Estate, Windsor.
- David Martin Griffin, Chauffeur to The Princess Margaret, Countess of Snowdon.
- Chief Petty Officer Steven John Hope, HM Yacht Britannia.
- Petty Officer Anthony Ingram, HM Yacht Britannia.
- Jonathan Warner Joy, Plasterer, A. G. Joy & Son Ltd. For services in connection with the restoration of the fire damage at Windsor Castle.
- James McGee, Head Storekeeper, Crown Estate, Windsor.
- Rodney Robin Playford, lately Farrier to the Royal Studs, Sandringham.
- Divisional Sergeant Major Lionel George Rossiter, MBE, Second Division of The Queen's Body Guard of the Yeomen of the Guard.
- Petty Officer David Christopher Rowe, HM Yacht Britannia.
- Constable Michael Edwin Slade, Royalty Protection Department, Metropolitan Police.
- Marshall Smith, lately Senior Fire Prevention Officer, Windsor Castle.
- Norman James Spruce, lately Gardener, Sandringham Estate.
- Clare Venables, Plasterer, St. Blaise Ltd. For services in connection with the restoration of the fire damage at Windsor Castle.
- Musician John Zopara Leo Wright, HM Yacht Britannia.
- Jonathan Wilfred Wright, Project Supervisor, Taylor Made Joinery (Bildeston) Ltd. For services in connection with the restoration of the fire damage at Windsor Castle.

=== Order of the British Empire ===
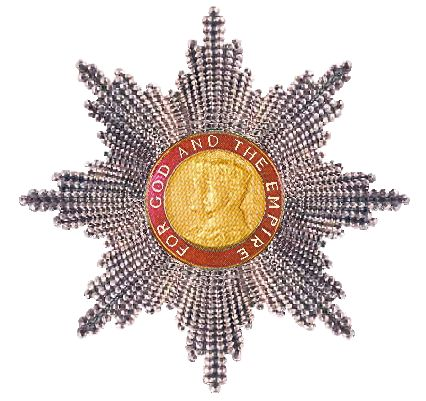
Grand Cross's star of the Order of the British Empire

The Most Excellent Order of the British Empire is an order of chivalry comprising five classes in civil and military divisions. It is the junior of the British orders of chivalry, and the largest, with over 100,000 living members worldwide. The highest two ranks of the order, the Knight/Dame Grand Cross and Knight/Dame Commander, admit an individual into knighthood or damehood allowing the recipient to use the title Sir or Dame.

==== Knights Grand Cross (GBE) ====
Military Division

- Air Chief Marshal Sir William Wratten, KBE, CB, AFC, Royal Air Force.

Civil Division

- Nathaniel Charles Jacob, Baron Rothschild. For services to the Arts and to Heritage.

==== Dames Commander (DBE) ====
Civil Division

- Patricia Collarbone, Director, London Leadership Centre. For services to Education.
- Tamsyn Imison, Head Teacher, Hampstead School, Camden, London. For services to Education.
- Mary Elizabeth Uprichard, OBE, President, United Kingdom Central Council for Nursing, Midwifery and Health Visiting. For services to Health Care.

==== Knights Commander (KBE) ====
Military Division

- Lieutenant General Roderick Alexander Cordy-Simpson, CB OBE, (474830), late 13th/18th Royal Hussars.

Diplomatic Service and Overseas List

- The Honourable Mr Justice John Charles Rowell Fieldsend, lately President, Court of Appeal, Gibraltar.
- Robert John Peliza, OBE ED, lately Chief Minister, Gibraltar.

==== Commanders (CBE) ====
Military Division

- Commodore Anthony James Hunter Burbridge, Royal Navy.
- Commodore Richard John Norman Hibbert, Royal Navy.
- Colonel Paul Anthony Davis, OBE, (488416), late The Princess of Wales's Royal Regiment.
- Colonel Timothy Edward Hall (489533), late The Royal Tank Regiment.
- Brigadier Edward Richard Holmes, OBE TD, (483098), General Staff Territorial Army.
- Brigadier Robert John Shields (480395), late Corps of Royal Electrical and Mechanical Engineers.
- Brigadier Michael Gordon Taylor, MBE, (475246), late Royal Corps of Signals.
- Air Commodore Brian Kevin Burridge, Royal Air Force.
- Group Captain John Edgar Chandler, OBE, Royal Air Force.
- Air Commodore Alan Peter Waldron, AFC, Royal Air Force.

Civil Division

- Professor Robert Cairns Brown Aitken, lately Chairman, Royal Infirmary of Edinburgh NHS Trust. For services to Health Care.
- William James Laidlaw Baillie, President, the Royal Scottish Academy. For services to the Arts.
- Mark Alexander Wyndham Baker, Chairman, Magnox Electric plc. For services to the Nuclear Electricity Industry.
- Raymond Edwin Baker, OBE. For services to the community and to Industry in Fife.
- William Lawrence Banks, lately Chairman of Council, Royal Postgraduate Medical School. For services to Medical Education and to Clinical Research.
- Neville Storr Bark, Chairman of Council, National Institute of Agricultural Botany. For services to Agriculture.
- Michael Cecil John Barnes, lately Legal Services Ombudsman, Lord Chancellor's Department.
- Brian Allan Blackwell. For public service.
- David Cecil Blakey, QPM, Chief Constable, West Mercia Constabulary. For services to the Police.
- Professor William Bonfield, Director, Interdisciplinary Research Centre in Biomedical Materials. For services to Health Care and to Material Science.
- Allan Bridgewater, Group Chief Executive, Norwich Union. For services to the Insurance Industry.
- Michael John Brindle, Consultant Radiologist, King's Lynn and Wisbech Hospital NHS Trust and President, Royal College of Radiologists. For services to Radiology.
- John Reginald Verney Brooks, Director and Head, Exploration and Licensing, Oil and Gas Directorate, Department of Trade and Industry.
- Robert David Burchill, Director of Operations, Royal Mint.
- Professor John Stewart Cameron, Emeritus Professor of Renal Medicine, United Medical and Dental Schools, Guy's Hospital, London. For services to Nephrology.
- Professor John David Cash, National Medical and Scientific Director, Scottish National Blood Transfusion Service. For services to Transfusion Medicine.
- Peter Barrie Cheeseman, Theatre Director, New Victoria Theatre, Newcastle-under-Lyme. For services to the Theatre.
- John George Church, DL, Chairman, Church & Company pic. For services to the Footwear Industry.
- Peter David Clark, Head Teacher, Rastrick High School, Calderdale. For services to Education.
- Anthony James Clarke, lately Deputy General Secretary, Union of Communication Workers. For services to Industrial Relations, and to voluntary services.
- John Egwin Craig, OBE. For services to Banking and to Regeneration.
- Frederick William Crawley. For services to the Royal Air Force Benevolent Fund.
- Kenneth Culley, Director and Chief Executive, Portman Building Society. For services to the Building Society Movement.
- Wing Commander John Irfon Davies, MBE, RAF (Retd). For public service, especially to the National Health Service, in Wales.
- Robert Henry Dickinson, lately Senior Partner, Dickinson Dees Solicitors, Newcastle upon Tyne. For services to Business in North East England.
- Arthur Allan Dove, Chairman, Council for Registered Gas Installers. For services to Safety in the Gas Industry.
- Alfred John Duncan, Chairman, Grampian Country Food Group Ltd. For services to Agriculture.
- James Dyson. For services to Industrial Design.
- Carole Ann Evans, Head Teacher, Priory Primary School, Slough, Berkshire. For services to Education.
- Robert Sidney Thompson Ewing. For public service.
- James Reiach Fells, lately Head, Road Haulage Division, Department of the Environment, Transport and the Regions.
- Professor William Irvine Fraser, Professor in Learning Disabilities, University of Wales College of Medicine. For services to Psychiatry.
- Keith Geddes, President, Convention of Scottish Local Authorities. For services to Local Government.
- Balram Gidoomal. For services to the Asian Business community and to Race Relations.
- Michael Ian Grade, lately Chief Executive, Channel 4. For services to Broadcasting.
- Gurdip Singh Gujral, President, International Punjabi Society. For services to Community Relations.
- Richard Frederick Paynter Hardman, Director of Exploration, Amerada Hess Ltd. For services to the Oil and Gas Industries.
- Professor Kenneth Reginald Harrap, lately Director, Cancer Research Campaign Centre for Cancer Therapeutics. For services to Cancer Research.
- Malcolm Anthony Harris, Head, Resource Allocation and Funding Team, Department of Health.
- Bernard Peter Harty. For services to the City of London and to Local Government Finance.
- Andrew David Derry Hill, Aztec Chairman, London Regional Training and Enterprise Council. For services to Training.
- Anthony James Eric Hollis, MBE, lately Principal Establishment and Finance Officer, Treasury Solicitor's Department.
- Christopher John Holmes, Director, Shelter. For services to Homeless People.
- Professor Brian John Hoskins, FRS, Professor of Meteorology, University of Reading. For services to Meteorology.
- Alan Mackenzie Howard, Actor. For services to Drama.
- Gwynne Richard Howell. For services to Opera.
- Roy Lewis James, lately Her Majesty's Chief Inspector of Schools in Wales.
- Roger Jefcoate. For services to disabled people.
- Brigadier Lewis Johnman, TD. For services to the Territorial Auxiliary and Volunteer Reserve Association.
- Professor David John Johns, Vice Chancellor and Principal, University of Bradford. For services to Higher Education.
- Annely Juda. For services to the Visual Arts.
- Peter John Kitteridge, Assistant Director, Prison Service, Home Office.
- Doris Littlejohn, President, Industrial Tribunals (Scotland).
- Patrick Locke, Secretary of the Church Commissioners. For services to the Church of England.
- Professor David Lockwood. For services to Social Science, particularly in the Use of Empirical Evidence.
- Professor David John Lodge, Writer. For services to Literature.
- Angus Donald Mackintosh Macdonald, Chairman, Scottish Chamber Orchestra. For services to Music.
- Alastair Mackenzie, Chief Planning Officer, Scottish Office.
- Eileen Catherine Marshall, Director, Regulation and Business Affairs, OFGAS. For services to Regulatory Policy.
- James William Martin, Joint Managing Director, Martin-Baker Aircraft Company Ltd. For services to the Defence Industry.
- Professor Margaret Mary McGowan (Mrs. Anglo), Research Professor of French, University of Sussex. For services to French Cultural Studies.
- Peter McKinlay, Chief Executive, Scottish Homes. For public service.
- Derek John Alexander McLauchan, lately Chief Executive, National Air Traffic Services Ltd. For services to Aviation.
- Catherine McLoughlin. For services to the National Health Service.
- Anthony William Merricks, Director, Balfour Beatty Civil Engineering and Chairman, Stent Foundations Ltd. For services to the Construction Industry.
- John William Harold Morgan, Chairman, Trafford Park Development Corporation. For services to Urban Regeneration.
- The Reverend Michael Stuart Nattrass, lately Her Majesty's Chief Inspector of Construction, Health and Safety Executive.
- Colin Gray Nears. For services to Ballet.
- David Gareth Newman, Principal, Brooke Weston City Technology College, Corby, Northamptonshire. For services to Education.
- Lotte Therese Newman, OBE, General Medical Practitioner and President, Royal College of General Practitioners. For services to Medicine.
- Brian Thomas Graves Nicholson, Chairman, Advertising Standards Board of Finance Ltd. For services to the Newspaper Industry and to Advertising.
- Alan Osborne, Chairman, Construction Industry Standing Conference. For services to the Development of Vocational Qualifications.
- Michael David Patten, Collector, Eastern England, Her Majesty's Customs and Excise.
- Judith Mary Phillips, Head, Strategic Planning and Resources Team, Office for Standards in Education.
- Antony David Portno, Chairman, Bass International Brewers, Bass Leisure. Former Chairman, Bass Brewers. For services to the Brewing Industry.
- Geoffrey Walter Robinson, lately Director of Technology, IBM UK Ltd. For services to Engineering.
- Brian Hampton Saunders, Commercial Director, GEC Marconi Ltd. For services to the Defence Industry.
- William Howard Scholl. For services to the community on the Isle of Man.
- Evelyn Janet Sharman. For services to Conservation.
- Anthony John Sheppeck, Board Member, London Transport. For services to Public Transport in London.
- John Sherrington, QFSM, lately Chief Fire Officer, Essex County Fire and Rescue Service. For services to the Fire Service.
- Ruth Muldoon Silver, Principal, Lewisham College, London. For services to Further Education.
- Graeme Maxwell Simmers, OBE, Chairman, Scottish Sports Council. For services to Sport.
- Joan Rutherford Smyth. For services to Equal Opportunities.
- Keith Sullens, lately Chief Executive, Paymaster Agency, Her Majesty's Treasury.
- Ian Carr Fry Swithenbank, Leader, Northumberland County Council. For services to Local Government and to the community in Northumberland.
- Vivian Elliott Sgrifan Thomas, OBE, For services to the British Standards Institution.
- Clive Hepworth Thompson, lately Deputy Chairman, Audit Commission. For services to Local Government.
- Peter Kenneth Timms, MBE, Chairman and Managing Director, Flexible Technology Ltd. For services to the Electronics Industry in Scotland.
- Peter Tolman Warden, lately Executive Secretary, The Royal Society. For services to Science Administration.
- Michael Edward Wates, Chairman, Wates Group. For services to the Construction Industry.
- Peter Westland. For services to the Social Service.
- Professor Alasdair David Wilkie. For services to the Actuarial Profession.
- Peter James Joseph Winship, QPM, Her Majesty's Inspector of Constabulary. For services to the Police.
- Jeremy Frederick Woolridge, Chairman and Managing Director, B.E. Wedge Holdings Ltd. For services to Business in the West Midlands.

Diplomatic Service and Overseas List

- George David Blenkinsop, AM. For services to British culture in Australia.
- Petula Sally Clark (Mrs. Wolff). For services to entertainment.
- Egidio Anabile Cutayar. For services to British business in Egypt.
- Ruth Prawer Jhabvala. For services to literature and the cinema.
- Deborah Jane Kerr (Mrs. Viertel). For services to the theatre and cinema.
- Ian Ramsey Wilson. For services to banking and community welfare in Hong Kong.

==== Officers (OBE) ====
Military Division

- Commander Frances Ann Boyd, RD, Royal Naval Reserve.
- Commander Robert Andrew Mark Brown, Royal Navy.
- Commander Patrick John Gale, Royal Navy.
- Commander John Huntly Gordon, Royal Navy (to be dated 5 December 1997. Now deceased).
- Commander Richard Thomas Govan, Royal Navy.
- Commander Martin Roger Marks, Royal Navy.
- Chaplain Simon Edward Stephens, Royal Navy.
- Lieutenant Colonel James Godfrey Askew (507400), The Royal Logistic Corps.
- Colonel Peregrine Simon Wynch Felton Falkner (491148), late The Life Guards.
- Lieutenant Colonel Timothy Payn Murray Forster (516595), The Royal Logistic Corps.
- Acting Colonel Ian Robert Keers (494697), Leicestershire and Northamptonshire Army Cadet Force.
- Lieutenant Colonel Kenneth Gordon Lawson (495102), Adjutant General's Corps (ETS).
- Lieutenant Colonel Jeffrey John Little (499741), The Royal Logistic Corps.
- Lieutenant Colonel Nigel Patrick Lloyd (501637), The Royal Logistic Corps.
- Lieutenant Colonel Godfrey Jason John McFall (495204), The Parachute Regiment.
- Lieutenant Colonel David Charles Parkinson (496647), The Parachute Regiment.
- Lieutenant Colonel John Julius Rogers (485816), The King's Royal Hussars.
- Lieutenant Colonel John Noel Wolsey (503973), Adjutant General's Corps (SPS).
- Wing Commander Richard Michael Eastment (8024803T), Royal Air Force.
- Group Captain Glenn Howard Edge, Royal Air Force
- Wing Commander Phillip Giles (0207876G), Royal Air Force Volunteer Reserve (Training).
- Wing Commander Ray Russell Innes, MBE, (8000670G), Royal Air Force.
- Wing Commander Melvyn Frank Charles James, MBE, (5201616G), Royal Air Force.
- Wing Commander Anthony Leonard, BEM, (1934833V), Royal Air Force.
- Wing Commander Richard Graham Leonard (8021122D), Royal Air Force.
- Wing Commander Rosalie Ann Reid, ARRC, (0408852D), Princess Mary's Royal Air Force Nursing Service.
- Wing Commander Ian David Thorne (5203582J), Royal Air Force.
- Wing Commander Robert George Torrens, MBE, (5203152H), Royal Air Force.

Civil Division

- Ian Adamson. For services to Local Government.
- Elizabeth Allen, Head of Division, Personnel Policy and Management, The Highways Agency, Department of the Environment, Transport and the Regions.
- Nigel Alliance. For charitable services for the good of human kind in the North West of England.
- Ronald John Amy. For services to the Pensions Industry.
- Michael Deane Munro Ann. For services to Tourism and to Young People.
- Bertram Henry Annett. For services to Animal Welfare, especially FRAME.
- Kenneth Armstrong, JP. For services to the Magistracy in Tyne and Wear.
- Anthony Austin, Team Leader, Her Majesty's Board of Inland Revenue.
- John Christopher Stewart Baker, Grade 5, Ministry of Defence.
- Anne Heather Barlas. For services to the British Red Cross Society in Scotland.
- Tony William Bastock, Group Sales and Marketing Director, Contract Chemicals Ltd. For services to the Chemical Industry.
- David Leonard Nowell Battersby, Managing Director, Hospitality and Leisure Manpower. For services to Training in the Tourist Industry.
- Philip Stafford Baxendale. For services to Industry, especially Employee Share Ownership in Lancashire.
- Professor Brian Leicester Bayne. For services to the Prevention of Marine Pollution.
- Daryell Beaney. For services to the Police.
- Bruce Richard Bedwell, Audit Manager, National Audit Office.
- Geoffrey Bingham, Group Manager, Lord Chancellor's Department.
- Margaret Jean Blackburn, JP. For services to the British Red Cross Society in Berkshire.
- Peter Anthony Blake, lately Head Teacher, Windsor Boys' School, Berkshire. For services to Education.
- Norman Charles Blamey, Painter. For services to Art.
- David Edward Bland, Director General, Chartered Insurance Institute. For services to Training in the Insurance Industry.
- John Raymond Botham, Head Teacher, Greenwood Junior School, Nottingham. For services to Education.
- Ashley Keith Bowes. For services to the Federation of Fresh Meat Wholesalers.
- Pamela Ann Bowmaker, Head Teacher, Varndean School, Brighton. For services to Education in East Sussex.
- Dorothy Codling Bowman, Chairman of Governors, Cherry Willingham Primary School, Lincolnshire. For services to Education.
- Squadron Leader Barrie Epwell Lear Browning, MBE. For services to the Soldiers', Sailors' and Airmen's Families' Association in North Yorkshire.
- George Bruce, Chairman, Caithness and Sutherland NHS Trust. For services to Health Care.
- Graham William Butler, Deputy Chief Fire Officer, Tyne and Wear Metropolitan Fire Brigade. For services to the Fire Service.
- David Byers, Officer in Charge, Her Majesty's Board of Inland Revenue.
- Jennifer Cardwell. For services to Women's Hockey.
- Alistair Richard Cheyne, Director of Operations, The Automobile Association. For services to Motoring.
- Christopher David Clark, Principal Professional and Technology Officer, Ministry of Defence.
- Barry Keith Clarke. For services to the Save the Children Fund.
- Yvonne Jean Constance, JP, Chairman of the Chairmen's Group, Electricity Consumers' Committees. For services to Electricity Consumers.
- Barry John Cooke, Head Teacher, Hyde Technology School, Tameside. For services to Education.
- Laurence Charles George Cramp. For services to the Administration of Justice.
- Martin James Crane, Underwriting Manager, Export Credits Guarantee Department.
- Mary Cropper, Director of Operations, Community Healthcare Bolton NHS Trust. For services to Health Care.
- Annette Crosbie, Actress. For services to Drama.
- Alan Curless, Chief Executive, Chamber of Commerce, Training and Enterprise Hereford and Worcester. For services to Training.
- Peter John Davey. For services to Architecture.
- John Michael Davidson. For services to Groundwork and to Environmental Regeneration.
- Brian Keston Davies, lately Director of Education, Catholic Fund for Overseas Development. For services to Development Education.
- Christopher Norman George Dawes, Grade A (Upper) Department for Culture, Media and Sport.
- Robert Dean, lately Grade 7, Crown Prosecution Service.
- Satish Balkrishna Desai, PB6, Department of the Environment Transport and the Regions.
- Brigadier Anthony Keith Dixon. For services to the Ex-Services Mental Welfare Society.
- Rita Margaret Donaghy. For services to UNISON and to Industrial Relations.
- Walter Done, Deputy County Education Officer, Cheshire. For services to Education.
- Robert Frank Dorey, Chairman, Tramtrack Croydon Ltd. For services to Public Transport.
- David John Meredith Doubble. For services to the Property Advisory Group.
- Anne Coultas Dunford, President, Anglia Region, the Guide Association. For services to Guiding.
- John Bryson Durno, Director of Custody, Scottish Prison Service.
- Grattan Endicott. For services to the Foundation for Sport and the Arts.
- Lieutenant Commander George Evatt RN (Retd.), Member, Board of Visitors, Her Majesty's Prison Dartmoor. For services to Prisoner Welfare.
- Judith Mary Eve. For services to the community.
- James Edmund Everitt, Chairman, Centre for Applied Microbiology and Research. For services to Health Care.
- Joseph Finklestone. For services to Journalism.
- Frank A. Flear, DL, Chairman, Grimsby Fish Dock Enterprise Ltd. For services to the Fishing Industry.
- Lorraine Fletcher, Director of Social Policy, Equal Opportunities Commission. For services to Equal Opportunities.
- Professor Alexander Robert Forrester, Vice-Principal, University of Aberdeen. For services to Science and to Education.
- Robert Gale. For Services to the Consumer in Europe Group.
- Nicholas Withycombe Garland, Cartoonist. For services to Journalism.
- Ronald Stanley Gee, Deputy Chair, Local Government Association. For services to Local Government.
- Cecilia Margaret Gerrard, DL, Lately Chairman, Surrey County Council. For services to Local Government.
- Keith Gillard, Chief Executive, Mid Glamorgan Education Business Partnership. For services to Industry and Education in South Wales.
- Group Captain Eric John Goodman. For services to Princess Marina House and to the RAF Benevolent Fund in West Sussex.
- Antony Mark David Gormley, Sculptor. For services to Sculpture.
- Teresa Colomba Graham, Member, Government Better Regulation Task Force. For service to Small Business.
- Squadron Leader Andrew Duncan Green, Driver, Thrust Supersonic Car.
- Dennis Green, Principal Valuer, Her Majesty's Board of Inland Revenue.
- Leon Greenman. For services to Community Relations.
- Paul Gregory, Director of Planning and Development, Scottish Borders Council. For services to Local Government.
- Judith Grice, Head, Environmental Design and Planning, British Waterways. For services to Waterway Conservation.
- Gwilym Huw Griffith, Senior Consultant Surgeon and Medical Director, Glan Hafren NHS Trust. For services to Medicine.
- David Nicholas Hall, Director, Foundation for Science and Technology. For services to the Understanding of Science and Technology.
- Rosemary Charlotte Hall, Inspector of Taxes, Her Majesty's Board of Inland Revenue.
- Trevor Hall, Senior Race Relations Consultant, Home Office.
- Leslie Edward Hamilton, Lately Mayor, Hove Borough Council. For services to the community in East Sussex.
- Ann Elizabeth Hamlin. For public service in the Built Heritage.
- Colin Hammacott. For services to Health Care and to the community in Swansea, South Wales.
- Alison Joy Hardinge. For services to the Food Advisory Committee.
- Geoffrey Hare, Lately County Librarian, Essex. For services to Librarianship.
- Anke Harris, Vice-Chairman, Dorset Training and Enterprise Council. For services to Training.
- Peter Richard Head, Chief Executive, Maunsell & Partners. For services to Bridge Engineering.
- Richard John Heald, Consultant Surgeon, North Hampshire Hospitals NHS Trust. For services to Medicine.
- Patricia Herrmann, JP. For services to the Magistracy and the community in Essex.
- James Higgins, Consultant Forensic Psychiatrist. For services to the Advisory Board on Restricted Patients.
- Anthony Brian Hill. For services to the community in the North East of England.
- Keith Stevens Gleave Hinde, TD. For services to the King George's Fund for Sailors and to the Cutlers' Company.
- James Keith Howell, Head of Publicity Section, Office of Fair Trading.
- John Robert Hume, Chief Inspector of Historic Buildings, Scottish Office.
- Martin Osborne Johnson. For services to Rugby Union Football.
- Michael Stanley Johnson, Director, France Area, Commonwealth War Graves Commission.
- Brigadier Peter Dunbar Johnson, General Secretary, The Officers' Association. For services to ex-Service personnel.
- Jane Madeleine Johnston. For services to the community, especially Health Care, in North Cumbria.
- Helena Denise Josephine Kellaway, Section Head, Department of Health.
- Abdul Matin Khan, President, Ethnic Minorities Minority Group. For services to Community Relations in Scotland.
- Sandra June Kilner, lately Principal Scientific Officer, Ministry of Defence.
- William Andrew Kilpatrick, Farmer. For services to the Dairy Industry and to the Hostein Friesian Society.
- James Leckie Kinloch, Chairman, Kinloch Group. For services to the Electronic Engineering Industry and to the community in Inverclyde.
- Brian John Kirky, Chairman, Advisory Board on Homoeopathic Products. For services to Health Issues.
- Beryl Edith Knox, Grade 7, Health and Safety Executive.
- Arthur Ernest Lally, Head of Radiochemistry Unit, Veterinary Laboratories Agency, Ministry of Agriculture, Fisheries and Food.
- Peter George Lambert, Regional Director (West Midlands), Business in the Community. For services to Business/Education Links.
- Professor Ronald Lander, Chairman and Managing Director, Scotlander plc. For services to Small Businesses.
- William Antony Lawrence, Business Development Director (Armaments), VSEL. For services to the Defence Industry.
- Morris Daniel Levine, Director, North West London Housing Association. For services to Homeless Offenders and Substance Misusers.
- Ronnie Stuart Levine, General Dental Practitioner and Scientific Adviser to the Health Education Authority, Leeds. For services to Dentistry.
- Kenneth Charles Lewis, Managing Director, Dutton Engineering (Woodside) Ltd. For services to Industry in East Anglia.
- David Lindley, Managing Director, Lindley Associates. For services to Renewable Energy and to the Wind Turbine Industry.
- Margaret Rutherfurd Lindsay, Director, Centre for Residential Child Care. For services to Young People.
- Peter Woodgate Lipscomb, External Affairs Director, Diageo plc. For services to the Packaging Industry, Business and the Environment.
- Gerard Anthony Lobo, Grade 6, Department of the Environment, Transport and the Regions.
- John Robert Love, Grade 7, Welsh Office.
- The Very Reverend Robert Victor Alexander Lynas. For services to Education.
- Geoffrey William Lynch. For services to the Export Credit Guarantee Department.
- William Lyons, lately Regional Director, Scottish Agriculture College. For services to Agricultural Education.
- Professor Sarah Jane Macintyre, Director, MRC Sociology Unit, Glasgow. For services to Medical Sociology.
- Brian Mackenzie. For services to the Superintendents' Association of England and Wales, and to the Police.
- Georgina Mary Mace, Research Fellow, Institute of Zoology. For services to the Preservation of Endangered Species.
- Rupert Mahaffy. For services to the National Army Museum Development Trust.
- Jeremy John Crosby Mallinson, Director, Jersey Wildlife Preservation Trust. For services to Animal Conservation.
- Professor Aubrey William George Manning, lately Professor of Natural History, University of Edinburgh. For services to the Environment.
- Paul Raymond Marshall. For services to Commercial and Economic Development in Wales.
- Susan Wilson Marshall, lately Director of Housing Services, Brighton Borough Council. For services to Housing.
- William Robert Graham Martin, JP. For services to the community.
- Professor Thomas Jefferson Maxwell, Director, Macaulay Land Use Research Institute. For services to Land Use and to Hill Farming.
- Pamela May. For services to Ballet.
- William Greer McCollum. For services to Agriculture.
- Christine E. Mcgregor, lately Social Work Commissioner, Mental Welfare Commission. For services to Social Work.
- Geoffrey Walter Medcraft, Professional and Technology Superintending Grade, Defence and Evaluation and Research Agency, Ministry of Defence.
- Walter Millsom. For charitable services in the field of Property Management.
- Michael Kerry Bostock Molyneux, Senior Group Occupational Hygienist, Shell International Ltd. For services to Occupational Hygiene.
- James Joseph Monaghan. For public service.
- Oswald Norman Morris, DFC AFC. For services to Cinematography and to the Film Industry.
- John Bruce Mowson. For services to the community, especially Health Care, in East Anglia.
- Ian Holstein Muir, Chairman, Board of Management, Jewel and Esk Valley College. For services to Education and to Industry.
- Shelagh Mary Murphy, International Secretary, Royal College of Nursing. For services to Health Care.
- John Murray, lately Director, Publications Group, Central Office of Information.
- Michael Murray, Chief Civil Engineer, Babcock Rosyth Defence Ltd. For services to Civil Engineering and to the Defence Industry.
- Ernest Naylor. For services to Marine Science Research.
- Haji Mohammad Nazir, Chair, Sheffield Racial Equality Council Executive Committee. For services to Community Relations.
- Geoffrey William Newman, Assistant Collector, London Airports, Her Majesty's Customs and Excise.
- Patrick Nolan, Director of Social Services, Rotherham, South Yorkshire. For services to the Social Services.
- Judy Norman. For services to the Soldiers', Sailors' and Airmen's Families Association.
- Celeste Veronica Nri. For services to the Wandsworth Black Elderly Project and Age Activity Centre, Wandsworth, London.
- Thomas John O'Malley, lately Head Teacher, St David's Roman Catholic High School, Dalkeith. For services to Education.
- Patrick O'Neill, JP, Provost, West Dunbartonshire Council. For services to Local Government.
- Professor Martin Lewis Parry. For services to the Environment and to Climate Change.
- Rowland Albert Penrose, QPM, National Co-ordinator, Regional Crime Squads for England and Wales. For services to the Police.
- Timothy Andrew Pickup. For services to the Telecommunications Industry.
- Jennifer Susan Pitman, Trainer. For services to Horse Racing.
- Lynda Lee-Potter, Feature Writer and Columnist, The Daily Mail. For services to Journalism and for charitable services.
- John Edward Curtis Prebble, Historian. For services to History and to Literature.
- John David Miles Preshous, lately Head Teacher, Bishop's Castle Community College, Shropshire. For services to Education.
- Ann Veronica Priston, Senior Forensic Scientist, Home Office.
- Gillian Mary Pugh, Chief Executive, Thomas Coram Foundation for Children. For services to Young People's Development.
- Oliver Rackham. For services to Nature Conservation.
- Brigadier John Joseph Regan. For services to the Leonard Cheshire Foundation.
- Elizabeth Heather Reid. For services to Education.
- David Richardson, Grade 7, Ministry of Defence.
- Gareth Winston Roberts. For services to Local Government in Wales.
- Jennifer Susan Margaret Roberts, Chief Probation Officer, Hereford and Worcester Probation Service. For services to the Rehabilitation of Offenders.
- Richard Noel Roberts, Chairman, Welsh Optical Committee. For services to Optometry in Wales.
- Roger Hedley Roberts, Manager, Explosives, AWE Aldermaston. For services to the Defence Industry.
- Graham Roy Robertson, lately Leader, Bristol City Council. For services to the community in Bristol.
- Neil Stewart Robinson, Deputy Chairman, Radio Partnership Ltd. For services to Radio Broadcasting.
- Simon Richard Noel Rodway. For services to the British Red Cross Society.
- Diana Rookledge, Chairman, Home Office's Immigration and Nationality Complaints Audit Commission.
- Commander Walter Ross, Chief Officer, Royal Parks Constabulary.
- Bernard Rowe, TD, Director, Division of Enteric Pathogens, Central Public Health Laboratory. For services to the Surveillance of Food Borne Illnesses.
- Jack Rowell. For services to Rugby Union Football.
- Charles Keith Rowland, lately Principal, Tresham Institute of Further Education, Northamptonshire. For services to Further Education.
- Penelope Marilyn Hughes Ryan, Principal, Gorseinon College, Swansea. For services to Education in Wales.
- Tessa Sanderson, MBE. For services to Athletics and for charitable services.
- Vivien Inez Saunders. For services to Women's Golf.
- Patricia Molly Scopes, Senior Vice-Principal, Queen Mary and Westfield College, University of London. For services to Higher Education and to Science.
- The Reverend John Francis Searle, Consultant Anaesthetist, Exeter Health Trust. For services to Medicine and to the Hospice Movement.
- Martha Pettigrew Sheridan, Anti-Smuggling Business Manager, Her Majesty's Customs and Excise.
- Elizabeth Sidney. For services to Women's Issues.
- John William Simms, Grade 6, Ministry of Defence.
- David Tennant Sinker, JP. For Services to the Legal Aid Board.
- David Bodfield Smith, Grade 7, Department of Social Security.
- Gordon Thomas Smith, lately Assistant Controller, Her Majesty's Board of Inland Revenue.
- Leonard Charles Smith, Grade 7, Department of Social Security.
- Alan Sparkes, Chief Engineer, ASRAAM, BAe (Dynamics Division). For services to the Defence Industry.
- Professor Frank Russell Stannard, lately Professor of Physics, Open University. For services to physics and to the Popularisation of Science.
- Max Laurence Steinberg, Regional Director, Housing Corporation, Merseyside and North West Region. For services to Housing in Liverpool.
- J. H. Alan Stevenson, Executive Manager, Scottish Association of Meat Wholesalers. For services to the Scottish Meat Industry and to Export.
- James Stevenson, Chief Executive, British Cement Association. For services to the Construction Industry.
- Richard Michiel Stevenson. For services to the Galleries of Justice Museum, Nottingham.
- Yvonne Anne Strachan, Scottish Women's Organiser, Transport and General Worker's Union. For services to Industrial Relations and to Women.
- Edward Cornock Straiton. For services to the Veterinary Profession and to Agriculture.
- Michael Thomas Street, Deputy Chairman, Transfed. For services to Training in the Bus Industry.
- Paul Strickland, Medical Manager, the Paul Strickland Scanner Centre, London. For services to Health Care.
- Diane Elizabeth Sudlow, Director, Scottish Road Safety Campaign. For services to Road Safety.
- Rex Vincent Symons, Regional Human Resource Manager, Employment Service, Department for Education and Employment.
- John Tarbit, Senior Fisheries and Aquatic Resource Adviser, Department for International Development.
- Barbara Ann Thomas, Programme Manager and Director of Training, Jarvis Breast Screening, Diagnostic and National Training Centre, Surrey. For services to Health Screening.
- David Emrys Thomas, Local Government Commissioner for England. For services to Local Government.
- Ian Mitchell Thomas, Chairman and Managing Director, Culpeper Ltd. For services to Export.
- David Hayhow Thompson. For services to the John Grooms Association for Disabled People.
- William Geoffrey Thompson, DL, Managing Director, Blackpool Pleasure Beach Ltd. For services to Tourism.
- William King Townend, lately Senior Adviser, Waste Management and Regulation Policy Group, Environment Agency. For services to Waste Management and Regulation.
- Stuart Charles Trotter, Lately Political Correspondent, The Herald. For services to Journalism.
- Sarah Merion Vaughan, Grade 7, Ministry of Defence.
- Susan Walker, Regional Water Manager, Environment Agency. For services to Water Management.
- William Connell Walker. For services to Air Cadet Gliding.
- Cecilia McCloskey-Walters. For services to Education.
- David John Waplington, Governor 2, Her Majesty's Young Offenders' Institution Moorland.
- Michael Daniel Ward, Chairman, Business Link Teesside. For services to the Business Link Movement.
- Judith Mary Waterman, Speech and Language Therapy Officer, Department of Health.
- Anthony Waterson. For services to Forestry in Scotland.
- John Grenville Bernard Watson, lately Chief Executive, Bradford City Challenge. For services to Regeneration.
- David Robert Watts, Principal Professional and Technology Officer, Ministry of Defence.
- Vincent Challacombe Watts. For advisory services to Financial Management and Change in Public Sector.
- Beverley Webster, Chief Executive, Webster Schaeff & Company. For services to the Coal Industry.
- Hilary, Lady Weir. For services to the Architectural Heritage Fund and to the Preservation of Historic Buildings.
- Ian Christopher White, Managing Director, The International Tanker Owners' Pollution Federation Ltd. For services to the Environment.
- William Haskins Whiteley. Lately Principal Inspector, Health and Safety Executive.
- Huw Tregelles Williams, Director, BBC National Orchestra of Wales. For services to Music.
- Professor Brian Wilshire, Pro Vice-Chancellor, University of Wales, Swansea. For services to Higher Education.
- Professor Barbara Ann Wilson, Senior Scientist, Applied Psychology Unit, Medical Research Council. For services to Medical Rehabilitation.
- James Renwick Wilson. For services to the Engineering Industry.
- Joan Wilson. For services to Counselling.
- Margaret Helen Wilson, Lately Chief Librarian, Department for Education and Employment.
- Duncan Ramsay Winning, Honorary President, Scottish Canoe Association. For services to Canoeing.
- John Winup, Lately Director, Procurement Services Division, Central Communications and Telecommunications Agency.
- Professor John Patrick Woodcock, Clinical Director of Medical Physics and Bioengineering, University Hospital of Wales and Professor of Medical Physics and Bioengineering, University of Wales College of Medicine, Cardiff. For services to Medical Science.
- Fred Simon Worms. For charitable services to the B'nai B'rith Housing Society.
- The Reverend Professor Frances Margaret Young, Edward Cadbury Professor of Theology, University of Birmingham. For services to Theology.
- Helen Elizabeth Zealley, QHP, Director of Public Health, Lothian Health Board. For services to Public Health.

Diplomatic Service and Overseas List

- Anna Joan Allott. For services to British-Burmese relations.
- Richard Lloyd Davies, Chief Resident Engineer, Mott MacDonald, Pakistan.
- Stephen Doyle, British Consular Correspondent, Maldives.
- Dr. Dorothy Anne Eggleton, Regional Medical Officer, HM Embassy, Moscow.
- Barbara May Ellington, lately Deputy Political Adviser, Hong Kong.
- Farzad (Fred) Faiz. For services to development in Hungary.
- Allen Foster. For services to ophthalmology in developing countries.
- Dr. William Michael Gould. For medical services in Nepal.
- David George Harries, MBE, Management Officer, British High Commission, Freetown.
- William Hay, Project Officer, Foreign and Commonwealth Office.
- Marcus Laurence Hulbert Hope, HM Ambassador, Kinshasa.
- Charity Ann Hopkins, Assistant Editor, British Yearbook of International Law.
- Dr. Derek Hopwood. For services to Middle East Studies.
- John Klaus Humbach, lately Head Minutewriter, NATO Secretariat.
- John Jackson, First Secretary, Foreign and Commonwealth Office.
- Stephen Roy Kendall, Member, Public Service Commission, Bermuda.
- Alasdair Russell Kerr. For services to British-Brazilian trade.
- Albert Norman King, LVO, Senior Management Officer, British High Commission, Lagos.
- Alan Kirkham, lately Managing Director, Mitel Telecom Ltd.
- Roger Anthony Latchford. For services to British business in Germany.
- Mostyn Thomas Lloyd. For services to British trade in the Western USA.
- Douglas Robert Manning. For services to business and the community in the South Eastern USA.
- Evan Ransford Missick. For public service, Turks and Caicos Islands.
- Agnes Nicol. For medical and welfare services to British Forces in Germany.
- Dr. Claire Dorothea Taylor Palley. For services to the promotion of human rights.
- Dr. Geoffrey Alan Perry. For services to British-Canadian relations.
- Richard Charles Perry, International Planning, Cable and Wireless Comms Ltd.
- Michael Paul Potter, Director, British Council, Argentina.
- James Richardson Potts, Director, British Council, Australia.
- Paul Reddicliffe, lately HM Ambassador, Phnom Penh.
- Peter Herman Rothschild. For services to British exports to continental Europe.
- Michael Dowdeswell Sargent, Director, British Council, Ethiopia.
- Frederick Scott, MBE. For services to British business in Nigeria.
- David Michael Skinner, lately Principal Assistant Secretary, Hong Kong.
- Dr. Helen Margaret Soteriou. For medical services in Cyprus.
- Christine Stone. For services to education in Nepal.
- Abraham Alan Tabbush. For services to British-Latin American relations.
- Richard Simon Tangye. For services to British business in Taiwan.
- Professor Victor Gerald Bulmer-Thomas, Director, Institute of Latin American Studies, University of London.
- Anthony Brian Travers. For professional and public service, Cayman Islands.
- Peter Michael Walsh, lately Senior Logistics Officer, UNHCR Tuzla, Bosnia-Herzegovina.

==== Members (MBE) ====
Military Division

- Captain (Local Major) Kenneth Richard Allison, Royal Marines.
- Lieutenant Commander Nicholas Jeremy Burton, Royal Navy.
- Warrant Officer Michael Keith Cooke.
- Lieutenant Commander Brian Hugh Douglas Cuming, Royal Navy.
- Captain Baden James Curtis, Royal Marines.
- Warrant Officer Robert Dean.
- Captain (Acting Major) David Campbell Dow, Royal Marines.
- Chief Petty Officer (Communications) Ian Thomas Driver, Royal Fleet Auxiliary.
- Lieutenant Commander William Robert Newby-Grant, RD, Royal Naval Reserve.
- Lieutenant Commander Nicholas John Hammond, Royal Navy.
- Warrant Officer David Harris.
- Warrant Officer Peter Brindley Hooson.
- Lieutenant Commander (now Acting Commander) Peter Reginald Lewis, Royal Navy.
- Lieutenant Commander Duncan Neil Matthews, Royal Navy.
- Leading Wren Education and Training Support Katherine Diana McWilliams, W137793E.
- Warrant Officer Stephen Derek Parry.
- Marine David Stephen Perkins, Royal Marines, PO29770H.
- Warrant Officer Alan Trevor Reynolds.
- Lieutenant Commander Duncan Charles Simmonds, Royal Navy.
- Warrant Officer John Snoddon.
- Lieutenant Commander Leslie Taylor, Royal Navy.
- Warrant Officer 1 William Weston, Royal Marines.
- Acting Lieutenant Colonel John Stewart Anderson (464288), Queen Mary's Grammar School Combined Cadet Force.
- 24429896 Warrant Officer Class 2 Gary McAvoy Bennett, Royal Regiment of Artillery.
- Acting Captain Roy Whitley Bevan (498499), Merseyside Army Cadet Force.
- 24722104 Corporal Steven Albert Bishop, Royal Corps of Signals.
- 24367814 Staff Sergeant Stephen Floyd Brealey, Royal Corps of Signals.
- 24396911 Warrant Officer Class 2 Nicholas John Buxton, Corps of Royal Electrical and Mechanical Engineers.
- 24630712 Warrant Officer Class 2 Donald Nicolson Cameron, Adjutant General's Corps (SPS).
- Captain Philip Caplin (542099), The King's Regiment, Territorial Army.
- Major Alan Douglas Campbell Clacher (503782), The Royal Logistic Corps.
- Major Richard Charles David Clark (499597), Royal Regiment of Artillery.
- Major Sally Phyllis Coulthard (515850), Adjutant General's Corps (ETS), Territorial Army.
- 24505738 Warrant Officer Class 2 Paul William Cunliffe, Welsh Guards.
- Major Michael John Davis (511304), Corps of Royal Electrical and Mechanical Engineers.
- W0814015 Sergeant Emma Doherty, Adjutant General's Corps (SPS).
- 24505610 Warrant Officer Class 1 Gerald Wilbert Edwards, The Royal Green Jackets.
- 24511574 Warrant Officer Class 1 Christopher Ashley Firth, Adjutant General's Corps (SPS).
- Major Philip Geoffrey Fisher (531256), The Queen's Royal Lancers.
- W0458807 Warrant Officer Class 2 Margaret Lillian Powers, Army Physical Training Corps.
- Captain Norman Michael Fox, (531551), Royal Regiment of Artillery.
- 24713624 Sergeant Damian Charles Gascoyne, Royal Regiment of Artillery.
- 24588747 Staff Sergeant Brian Douglas Gates, Corps of Royal Engineers.
- Lieutenant Colonel Robin Dewhurst Gibson (502975), Corps of Royal Engineers.
- Major Hemprakash Goshai (526018), Royal Army Medical Corps.
- Lieutenant Colonel James Gordon Graham (498638), Adjutant General's Corps (SPS).
- Major David Green (529671), The Royal Logistic Corps.
- The Reverend Roger John Hall (527113), Chaplain to the Forces (3rd Class), Royal Army Chaplains' Department.
- Major Paul Harris (533884), Grenadier Guards.
- 23988422 Warrant Officer Class 2 Thomas Ignatius Hayes, The Royal Irish Rangers, Territorial Army.
- Major Michael Clive Heelis (516419), Corps of Royal Electrical and Mechanical Engineers.
- Captain Philip Anthony Heyes (547620), Corps of Royal Engineers.
- Major Rowland John Thomas Hill (526167), Royal Regiment of Artillery.
- 24378547 Warrant Officer Class 1 Paul Clark Holden, Army Physical Training Corps.
- Major Anthony Hollingsworth (523721), The King's Regiment.
- Major Andrew Gordon Hughes (514507), The Queen's Royal Lancers.
- Major Bryan Hughes (520996), Intelligence Corps.
- 24118767 Warrant Officer Class 2 Alwyn Jones, 1st The Queen's Dragoon Guards.
- Major David John Morgan-Jones (513573), Royal Army Medical Corps.
- 24875044 Sergeant Tarquin Kitchin, Intelligence Corps.
- 24502091 Warrant Officer Class 2 Mark Knight, Royal Regiment of Artillery.
- 24482598 Colour Sergeant James Alexander Knox, The Royal Irish Rangers, Territorial Army.
- 24303240 Colour Sergeant Alan John Patrick Lewis, The Royal Regiment of Wales.
- 24234448 Warrant Officer Class 1 Paul Harry Lewis, Corps of Royal Electrical and Mechanical Engineers.
- Major (Queen's Gurkha Officer) Deoman Limbu (526962), The Royal Gurkha Rifles.
- Lieutenant Colonel Michael Hayward Lipscomb (467592), Corps of Royal Engineers.
- Captain Paul Logan (507589), Royal Regiment of Artillery, Territorial Army.
- 24425790 Warrant Officer Class 2 Christopher Lowthian, The Royal Logistic Corps.
- Lieutenant Colonel Lance Spencer Prescott Mans (501647), The Princess of Wales's Royal Regiment.
- 24383525 Warrant Officer Class 2 Frank Martin, Adjutant General's Corps (SPS).
- WO801715 Corporal Jane Elizabeth McClintock, The Royal Logistic Corps.
- 24373603 Warrant Officer Class 2 John Arthur Stanley McIlree, Coldstream Guards.
- 24683530 Sergeant Stephen James McKenna, Adjutant General's Corps (SPS).
- 24468236 Warrant Officer Class 2 Nicholas Charles McKeown, Army Air Corps.
- Captain Derek George Mertens (506673), The Royal Wessex Yeomanry.
- 24333087 Bombardier Jonathan Dennis Neal, Royal Regiment of Artillery.
- Acting Major Jonathan Stafford Nguyen Van-Tam (530726), Lincolnshire Army Cadet Force.
- 23846532 Staff Sergeant Gilbert Anderson Nimmo, Army Air Corps.
- Major George Pemberton Ross Norton (513733), Grenadier Guards.
- Major Philip Davis Nunn (521373), The Queen's Royal Hussars.
- 24314110 Warrant Officer Class 2 Peter Parnell, The Prince of Wales's Own Regiment of Yorkshire.
- 24284697 Warrant Officer Class 2 Stanley Payne, The Highlanders.
- Major James Edward Richardson (518948), Royal Corps of Signals.
- 24581235 Warrant Officer Class 2 Lenard Robey, The Royal Logistic Corps.
- Captain Michael Ross (508945), Royal Regiment of Artillery, Territorial Army.
- 24335142 Signaller Christoper Scales, Royal Corps of Signals.
- Major David Seed (485827), The Royal Regiment of Fusiliers.
- 24395077 Staff Sergeant Kevin Roy Smith, Corps of Royal Electrical and Mechanical Engineers.
- Major Thomas Leslie Smith (529206), The Royal Green Jackets.
- Major Paul Tucker (474078), Royal Regiment of Artillery.
- Major Philip Arthur Watkins (529847), Army Physical Training Corps.
- Major Raymond Watson (514737), Coldstream Guards.
- Acting Lieutenant Colonel Anthony George Williams (506052), Hele's School Combined Cadet Force.
- Lieutenant Colonel Colin Stewart Winter (476964), The Royal Highland Fusiliers.
- 24335680 Warrant Officer Class 1 Granville Orlando Yeomans, Royal Corps of Signals.
- Squadron Leader John Everard Abra (0688933A), Royal Air Force.
- Master Air Loadmaster Paul William Archard (J8141294), Royal Air Force.
- Warrant Officer Graham Desmond Ash (H0594040), Royal Air Force,
- Flight Sergeant Gary George Bennett (J8132893), Royal Air Force.
- Chief Technician Richard John Brew (P8109890), Royal Air Force.
- Warrant Officer Brian Maurice Cardy (HI950206), Royal Air Force.
- Flight Lieutenant Rupert Julian Sebastian Clark (2621881L), Royal Air Force.
- Sergeant Stephen Corrigan (R8208874), Royal Air Force.
- Warrant Officer Anthony Andrew Crossman (Q8068174), Royal Air Force,
- Flight Sergeant Paul Deacon (N1943953), Royal Air Force.
- Wing Commander Gordon Edward Diffey (8023510F), Royal Air Force.
- Warrant Officer Owen Gerard Frame (A8068889), Royal Air Force.
- Squadron Leader Douglas James Gale (5204990W), Royal Air Force.
- Corporal Stephen John Golightly (F8245890), Royal Air Force.
- Chief Technician Antony Derrick Harry Gower (Q8139105), Royal Air Force.
- Squadron Leader Anthony John Howell (5202722L), Royal Air Force.
- Warrant Officer John James Hunter, BEM, (V0594211), Royal Air Force.
- Squadron Leader Maxwell Patrick Jardim (5206808L), Royal Air Force.
- Warrant Officer David Walter John Lunnon, BEM, (N4272842), Royal Air Force.
- Warrant Officer Ian Gerald Macbeth (A 1931508), Royal Air Force.
- Sergeant Ashfaq Ahmed Malik (B8196346), Royal Air Force.
- Sergeant Alex McGregor (K8107233), Royal Air Force
- Squadron Leader Howard William Nash (8028480P), Royal Air Force.
- Flight Sergeant Steven Colin Parker (T8001962), Royal Air Force.
- Chief Technician Raymond George Pickering (E8072954), Royal Air Force.
- Chief Technician Kevin Rutter (Q8084620), Royal Air Force.
- Warrant Officer Eric Smith (D4276973), Royal Air Force.
- Flight Sergeant Bharat Bhushan Thaneja (K8008727), Royal Air Force.
- Flight Lieutenant Philip Tyler (8014520H), Royal Air Force.
- Flight Lieutenant Simon Timothy Walker (5203641D), Royal Air Force.
- Corporal Bryn David Williams (A8218878), Royal Air Force.

Civil Division

- David Adam, Physical Education Instructor, Her Majesty's Young Offenders' Institution Polmont.
- Susan Christine Adams, For services to the Citizens Advice Bureau in Tadley, Hampshire.
- Daphne Winifred Affleck. For services to Elderly People in Shrewton, Wiltshire.
- Donald Ernest John Allen, Chairman, Shrivenham Parish Council. For services to the community in Oxfordshire and Wiltshire.
- Joseph Anthony Allen, Industrial Technician, Ministry of Defence.
- Catherine Elizabeth Althaus. For services to the British Tourist Authority.
- Doris Amis. For services to the community in Selsey, West Sussex.
- Sarah Elizabeth Arnull. For services to the mobility of disabled people.
- David Sloan Coullie Arthur. For services to the Samaritans.
- Mary Crerar Arthur, Head Teacher, Tulloch Primary School, Perth. For services to Education.
- Audrey Kate Artus. For services to the ADA Reading Service for blind and disabled people.
- Edward Ashwell, Inspector, Metropolitan Police. For services to the Police.
- Edwin Albert Francis Atkinson. For charitable services to the community.
- Doris Auclair. For services to OXFAM in Chiswick.
- Mervyn Auty. For services to the British Limbless ex-Service Men's Association.
- Joan Bailey. For services to the Kids Club Network and to the community in Peterlee, County Durham.
- Joan Westrope Bailey. For services to the community in Buntingford, Hertfordshire.
- June Bailey. For services to the Gravesend Grammar School for Girls, Kent.
- Sarah Joanne Bailey. For services to Swimming for People with Disabilities.
- George Alexander Bain. For services to ENABLE in East Buchan.
- Raymond Whittier Baldwin. For services to the community in North West England.
- Myrtle Letitia Balfour. For public service.
- Ivan James Ball. For charitable services to the community in Aylestone, Leicestershire.
- Jane Irene Ballantyne, Revenue Officer, Her Majesty's Board of Inland Revenue.
- Oenwen Ballinger, lately Administrative Officer, Department of the Environment, Transport and the Regions.
- Kenneth John Banfield, JP, Organising Secretary, Plymouth and Devon Association of Boys' Clubs. For services to Young People.
- Joan Mary Banks. For services to Young People in Accrington, Lancashire.
- The Reverend John Banks. For services to the Manchester Methodist Housing Group and to Homeless People.
- Anne Banner. For services to the Billingham Ladies' Guilds, Royal National Lifeboat Institution.
- Dorothy Barker. For services to the WRVS and to the community in Stafford.
- James Leslie Barker, Senior Professional and Technology Officer, Ministry of Defence.
- Alice Barrow. For services to the Thwaites Primary School, Cumbria.
- Roger Maxwell Batten, Chairman, International Cost Engineering Council. For services to Cost Engineering.
- Lisbeth-Anne Howard Bawden. For services to the Lyme Regis Museum, Dorset.
- Christine Elizabeth Beedle, Managing Director, Monthind Ltd. For services to the Contract Cleaning Industry.
- Frederick Dennis Rhind Belford. For services to Folk Dance.
- Eileen June Bell. For services to Paediatric Nursing.
- Margaret Bell. For services to the British Red Cross Society.
- Gerard Michael Benbow, lately Senior Partner, Garston Veterinary Group. For services to Veterinary Science and to Animal Welfare.
- Beatrice Elisabeth Beresford, Author. For services to Children's Literature and for charitable services on Alderney.
- David Victor Best. For services to Hospital Broadcasting in Portsmouth Hospitals, Hampshire.
- Joyce Bethune. For services to Elderly People in Newcastleton, Roxburghshire.
- Enid Rosina Bickle. For services to the community in Port Talbot.
- Ceinwen Biffin. For services to Nursing in Neath and Port Talbot, South Wales.
- John Bishop, Transport Manager, Wolverhampton Metropolitan Borough Council. For services to Public Transport.
- Richard Blackburn, JP, Member, London Borough of Barking and Dagenham. For services to the community in Dagenham, Essex.
- Nancy Blair Blaik. For services to the Children's Hospice Association, Scotland.
- Robert James Blandford, Railway Signaller, Railtrack plc. For services to the Railway Industry and to the community in Wilton, Wiltshire.
- Albert Blood, PB8, Employment Service, Department for Education and Employment.
- Harold Charles Blumenthal, Honorary Alderman, Birmingham City Council. For services to the community in Birmingham.
- Paul Charles Bodkin, Police Constable, Gloucestershire Constabulary. For services to the community.
- Edward Boyle, Head Janitor, Hawick High School, Roxburghshire. For services to Education.
- Wendy Joyce Boyle, Personal Secretary, Her Majesty's Customs and Excise.
- Veronica Bradbury, Head, Allfarthing Primary School, Wandsworth, London. For services to Education.
- William Alan Brailsford. For services to Young People, especially Scouting, in Hereford.
- Helena Braithwaite. For services to Music Education in Wales.
- William George Bray, Foreman, Devonport Management Ltd. For services to the Defence Industry.
- Jeanne Esme Braybon. For services to disabled people in West Sussex.
- Vera Braynis. For services to Jewish Women's Issues.
- Margaret Ann Bremner. For services to Homeless People and to the NSPCC in West Bridgford, Nottinghamshire.
- Kenneth Brett, Skilled Fitter, Vickers Defence Systems Ltd. For services to the Defence Industry.
- Marlene Penelope Bristow, Senior Personal Secretary, Ministry of Defence.
- Michael Charles Britton, JP. Senior Executive Officer, Department of Social Security.
- Bessie Amelia Beatrice Brooker, Cook-in-Charge, Lychett Minister School, Dorset. For services to Young People.
- David Brown. For services to the Soldiers', Sailors' and Airmen's Families' Association in Cheshire.
- Houston Lowry Brown. For services to Agriculture.
- June Mary Brown. For services to the Citizens Advice Bureau in Wilmslow, Cheshire.
- Patricia Mary Brown. For services to Education.
- Jennifer Bryce, Principal, Bobath Centre for Children with Cerebral Palsy, London. For services to Health Care.
- Helen Sophia Bryson. For services to Prisoner Welfare.
- Frederick William Buckland. For services to the Ileostomy Association in London.
- Lee Reginald Budd, Team Leader, Vosper Thornycroft (UK) Ltd. For services to the Defence Industry.
- Malcolm James Bulcock. For services to Church Music in East Lancashire.
- David Edgar Burchell, Senior Professional and Technology Officer, Ministry of Defence.
- Rodney Burge, Coxswain, Amble Lifeboat, Royal National Lifeboat Institution. For services to Safety at Sea.
- Janet Winifred Anne Burgess. For services to the community, especially people with Autism, in Bromley, Kent.
- John Pickard Burnley. For services to War Pensioners.
- Ann Burrell. For services to Community Relations.
- Alma Butcher, Usher, Lord Chancellor's Department.
- Marjorie N. Butcher. For services to NCH Action for Children.
- Jillian Margaret Butler. For services to Mentally Ill People in Canterbury Kent.
- Sarah Ann Butterfield. For services to Young People with Disabilities on Guernsey.
- William Caird. For services to the community in Musselburgh, East Lothian.
- Edward Patrick Callender, Head of Honours, Department of Trade and Industry.
- Iain Donald Robert Cameron, lately Administrative Officer, War Pensions Agency, Department of Social Security.
- Sheila Smith Campbell, JP, Member, Scottish Legal Aid Board. For services to the community in Dumbarton.
- Kathleen Daisy Capp, School Crossing Patrol, Bedfordshire County Council. For services to Road Safety.
- Margery Carey, President, Union of Shop, Distributive and Allied Workers. For services to Industrial Relations.
- Shirley Joy Carman, Clerk, Essex Police. For services to the Police.
- Christine Jean Carmichael, Diabetic Nurse Specialist, Kirkcaldy Acute Hospitals NHS Trust. For services to Diabetic Children.
- Leonard Morgan James Carroll. For services to Young People in Wales.
- Isobel Cartwright. For services to the Glazert Activity Group, Lennox Castle Hospital, Glasgow.
- Thomas Henry Caskey. For services to the Police.
- Thomas D. Cassidy. For services to the Toy Industry and for charitable services in Lancashire.
- Michael Joseph Henry Caswell, lately Higher Executive Officer, House of Commons.
- The Reverend Canon Keith William Catchpole, Chaplain, Royal Military Police Training School, Chichester. For services to the Armed Forces.
- Patricia Mary Catt, Postmistress, Dalham, Suffolk. For services to the Post Office and to the Community.
- Geoffrey Thomas Chalder, Senior Investigation Officer, Her Majesty's Customs and Excise.
- Robert Ernest Chandler, Senior Professional and Technology Officer, Council for the Central Laboratory of the Research Councils. For services to Industrial Relations.
- John Chapman, Museum Technician 2, Royal Air Force Museum, Ministry of Defence.
- Michael Chapman, lately Executive Producer, Thames Television Ltd. For services to Television Drama.
- Bruce David Charman. For services to the community on the Isle of Wight.
- Hanora Cherkez, Support Grade 1, Department of Social Security.
- Monica Mary Cherry. For services to the Citizens Advice Bureau in Abingdon, Oxfordshire.
- Shun Chiu Chick, Laundryman, Ministry of Defence.
- Arthur Douglas Chimes. For services to the community on the Saffron Estate, Leicester.
- Gordon Imrie Christie, Regional Manager, Southern Region, Scottish Power. For services to the Electricity Industry and to Customer Relations.
- Ian John Christie. For services to the Boys' Brigade in Aberdeen.
- Christopher Frank Clarke, Retired Officer 2, Ministry of Defence.
- Frank Barnard Clarke, Member, North Hykeham Town Council. For services to the community in North Hykeham, Lincolnshire.
- Gillian Clarke, Dancer. For services to Dance.
- Sean Martin Clarke, Trade Union Coordinator, Defence Evaluation and Research Agency, Ministry of Defence.
- Dennis Edward Cloney, General Secretary, Scottish Taxi Federation. For services to the Taxi Trade.
- Iain Sutherland Coghill, lately Section Manager, Intervention Board, Ministry of Agriculture, Fisheries and Food.
- Shelagh Hazel Coleman. For services to the WRVS in Leamington Spa, Warwickshire.
- Michael Arthur Thomas Coles. For services to the Public Health Laboratory Service, Cambridge.
- Peter John Collard, Head of City Centre Management, Coventry City Council. For services to Motoring and to SCOPE.
- Margaret Anne Collyer. For services to Education for Young People with Learning Difficulties.
- Patricia Anne Comber, Inspector of Taxes, Her Majesty's Board of Inland Revenue.
- Norman Connolly. For services to the Police.
- Andrew Constantine, lately Waste Regulation Officer, Environment Agency. For services to Waste Management and to the Environment.
- Georgina Cook, lately Cafeteria Supervisor, House of Commons.
- William Cooper, lately Senior Scientific Officer, University of Dundee. For services to Scientific and Clinical Research.
- William Norman Cope, Fisherman. For services to the Fish Industry.
- The Reverend Joseph Benjamin Corbett. For services to the community in Aston, Birmingham.
- Jane Coward. JP. for services to the community in Shrewsbury, Shropshire.
- Robert James Craig. For public service.
- Harry Edward Cramp. For services to the community in Torrington, Devon.
- June Ann Crannaford, Senior Personal Secretary, Ministry of Defence.
- Graham Cribb, Foster Parent, Farnham. For services to Young People in Surrey.
- Pamela Cribb, Foster Parent, Farnham. For services to Young People in Surrey.
- Richard Owen Glendower Croft. For services to the community, especially Island Partnership, on the Isle of Sheppey, Kent.
- Winifred Joyce Crow. For services to the Sussex Archaeological Society.
- Brian Alan Cumming, lately Estate Warden, Ministry of Defence.
- Gordon Cunliffe, JP, Human Resource Manager, Milliken Industrials Ltd. For services to Business and Education Links.
- Father Christopher Basil Cunningham. For services to the community in the City of London.
- David James Currie, Higher Professional and Technology Officer, Ministry of Defence.
- James Kerr Fulton Currie. For services to Local Government.
- Joan Daly. For services to the community, especially Young People, in Wavertree, Liverpool.
- June Darrah. For services to Voluntary Agencies including the WRVS in Northallerton, and the district of Yorkshire.
- Kenneth Malcolm Davies. For services to Swimming in Wales.
- Marian Daves, lately Teacher, Wood Green School, Witney, Oxfordshire. For services to Education.
- Ronald John Day, Subpostmaster, Morecambe, Lancashire. For services to the Post Office and to the community.
- Alice De Carteret. For charitable services, especially to the Professor Saint Medical Charity on Sark.
- Terry Denison. For services to Swimming.
- Doris Elsie Dewing, Support Grade 1, Chief Whip's Office, 12 Downing Street.
- Rachel Mary Dickson. For charitable services to the community in Richmond, Surrey.
- Francis Dillon, lately Registrar, Falkirk. For services to the community.
- Robert Nicol Dinnie, Head Commissionaire, Strathclyde Police. For services to the Police and to the community in Glasgow.
- Peter Goodwyn Disbrey. For services to the community in Rotherham, South Yorkshire.
- Thomas Dixon. For services to the community in Slough, Berkshire.
- Christopher Dodkin, Administrative Officer, Ministry of Defence.
- Marlene Dolman, School Secretary and Budget Manager, Northfield Infant and Junior Schools, Nottinghamshire. For services to Education.
- Kathleen Dougall. For charitable services in Wrexham.
- Evelyne Clare Dove. For charitable services to the community in Thanet, Kent.
- Sarah, Lady Dowson. For services to West London Action for Children.
- Olive Lucy Drage. For services to the Royal Society of Chemistry.
- Elizabeth Betty Drake. For services to the community, especially the Royal British Legion, in Yeovil, Somerset.
- Phyllis Janet Drake, Higher Executive Officer, Department of Social Security.
- Peter Dransfield. For services to the community in Mirfield, West Yorkshire.
- Margaret Dundas, Member, Lothian Health Council. For services to the community in West Lothian.
- William Dunn, Postman Higher Grade, Plymouth, Devon. For services to the Post Office and to St. Luke's Hospice.
- Joseph John Dunton, President, J. Dunton & Company. For services to the Camera and Film Industries.
- William Henry Dutfield. For services to the Carpet Industry and for charitable services to the community in Axminster, Devon.
- Patricia Dye, Usher, Lord Chancellor's Department.
- Christine Lloyd Dyer. For services to Nursing, especially to Elderly and Mentally Infirm People, in South Wales.
- John William Eadson, Farm Worker. For services to Agriculture in Mansfield, Nottinghamshire.
- Lilian Joyce Eagle. For services to the London Rowing Club.
- Michael James Easterbrook, lately County Commandant, Hertfordshire Special Constabulary. For services to the Police.
- Patricia Alice Eastop. For services to the community, particularly the Nativity Play, in Aldermaston, Berkshire.
- Michael David Ebborn, Firefighter, Bedfordshire and Luton Fire and Rescue Service. For services to the Fire Services' National Benevolent Fund.
- John Edward Ebenezer. For charitable services to Young and Disabled People in Surrey.
- Susanah Mary Edmunds, lately Senior Paintings Conservator, Victoria and Albert Museum.
- Peter John Edwards, Team Leader, Jealott's Hill Research Station, Zeneca Agrochemicals. For services to Ornithology and to Conservation in Agriculture.
- Frances Ballantyne Elder. For services to Stresswatch Scotland.
- Patricia England. For services to Mentally Ill People.
- Joyce Isabel Eustace, School Crossing Patrol, Twickenham, Middlesex. For services to Road Safety.
- David Anthony Evans, Group Leader, Her Majesty's Board of Inland Revenue.
- Derwyn Robert Evans. For services to Local Government in Ceredigion, Wales.
- Dorothy Olwen Evans. For services to the WRVS at Her Majesty's Prison, Cardiff.
- Francis Norman Evans. For charitable services.
- Glyn Evans, JP. For services to the YMCA in Swansea and to Y Care (Wales).
- Kathryn Benson-Evans. For services to the Guide Movement.
- Jennifer Anne Farrell. For charitable services in Warwickshire.
- Joan Primrose Scott Ferguson, Honorary Secretary, Scottish Genealogy Society. For services to Genealogy.
- Mala Shusila Rani Ramdour Fernando, Health Care Attendant (Outpatients), Great Ormond Street Hospital for Children NHS Trust. For services to Health Care.
- Elizabeth Gair Fisher, Superintendent Physiotherapist, Inverclyde Royal Hospital. For services to Health Care.
- Barry Victor Fitzgerald. For services to the Norfolk and Suffolk Committee for the Employment of People with Disabilities.
- Henry George Fleuret. For services to the Band of the Island of Jersey.
- Carl George Fogarty. For services to Motor Cycling.
- Kathleen Mary Fogg, lately Head Teacher, RAF Waddington Nursery School. For services to Service Families.
- Gloria Ford, Personal Secretary, Home Office.
- John Ian Forsyth. For services to Nature Conservation.
- Brian Gordon Fowler, Senior Storekeeper, Ministry of Defence.
- Andrew Fulton Fraser, Local Officer 2, Benefits Agency, Department of Social Security.
- Alan Leslie Freeman, Broadcaster. For services to Music.
- Beryl Olive Frood. For services to the Friends of Annandale and Eskdale Museums.
- Michael Henry Fussey. For services to the protection of Public and Animal Health.
- John Gallagher. For services to the Regeneration of Castlemilk, Glasgow.
- David James Gardner, Managing Director, DJG Exhibition Freight Services Ltd. For services to Export.
- Jayne Garlick, Helpline Assistant, Yorkshire Water Services Ltd. For services to the Water Industry in Yorkshire.
- Michael Rhoderick Garton, lately Environmental Health Manager, Brighton Borough Council. For services to Health and Safety at Work.
- Margaret Gaskin. For services to the community in Warrington, Cheshire.
- Sandra Mary Gate. For services to Remploy, Cleator Moor, Cumbria.
- Joseph Woolf Gerber. For services to Scottish Theatre.
- Roy Leonard Gerrard. For services to Enterprises by the Blind in Bedfordshire.
- Malcolm Peter James Gibbon, Registration Executive 1, Land Registry.
- Ian James Gibson, Head Teacher, Parkgate Junior School, Watford, Hertfordshire. For services to Education.
- Charan Singh Gill, Managing Director, Harlequin Leisure Group Ltd. For services to the Food and Restaurant Industry.
- William John Gillam, Group Manager, Area Traffic Control, Leicester City Council. For services to Transport Planning.
- Richard John Holt Gillman. For services to REMAP in Hampshire.
- James Alexander Gilzean, Estate Manager, Brahan Estates, Ross and Cromarty. For services to Agriculture.
- Ella Glazer. For services to the Celebrities Guild of Great Britain.
- Peter John Goss. For services to Yachting.
- Alfred Richard Gover. For services to Cricket.
- Dario Gradi. For services to Association Football.
- Joan Mary Grainger. For services to the Friends of Furness Hospitals, Cumbria.
- George Lockhart Grant. For services to the St. Andrew's Ambulance Association in Dundee and Angus.
- Kenneth Stafford Gray, Executive Officer, Department of Social Security.
- Margaret Gray. For services to Education.
- Paula Greaves. For services to the National Federation of Solo Clubs.
- May Green. For services to Special Educational Needs at Queens Church of England Junior School, Warwickshire.
- Royden George Greening. For services to the community, especially Disabled People in Cardiff.
- George Royston Gregory. For services to the Soldiers', Sailors' and Airmens' Families' Association in Cambridgeshire.
- Charles Griffiths. For services to Bridgend Town Cricket Club.
- Raymond Vaughan Griffiths, Sub-Divisional Officer, Special Constabulary, South Yorkshire Police. For services to the Police.
- Henry Shaw Guildford, lately Chairman, Dertwentside District Council. For services to the community in Durham.
- Harold William Gulliver, Governor 3, Prison Service Headquarters, Home Office.
- Hermione Jennifer Gurney, JP. For services to Learning Disabled People, especially those with Down's syndrome, in Canterbury, Kent.
- Eric Haines, Sub-Officer (Retained), South Wales Fire Service. For services to the Fire Service.
- Thomas Leslie Haines, Chief Inspector, Gloucestershire Constabulary. For services to the community in Nailsworth, Gloucestershire.
- Thomas Hale. For services to Employment.
- Stewart Hall, Prison Officer, Her Majesty's Prison Hull.
- Patricia Harding. For services to Music in East Sussex.
- Enid Hare, Higher Executive Officer, Department for Education and Employment.
- Avril Harfield, lately School Crossing Patrol, Metropolitan Police. For services to Road Safety.
- John Harlow, Senior Programme Manager, British Aerospace plc. For services to the Defence Industry.
- Edwina Hart, Chairperson, Wales TUC. For services to the Trade Union Movement.
- Eric Hart, Company Welfare Officer, British Nuclear Fuels Ltd. For services to Employee Welfare and to the community in Lancashire.
- Oubay Hassan, Lecturer, University of Wales Swansea. For services to the Thrust Supersonic Car Team.
- William Hastings. For services to the Royal Air Forces Association in Fife.
- Ethel May Hatheld, lately School Crossing Patrol, Stoke-on-Trent City Council. For services to Road Safety.
- Colin Haylock. For services to Maxillofacial Technology.
- David Fredrick Hayward, lately Sergeant, Northamptonshire Police. For services to the Police.
- Michael David Hendry, General Medical Practitioner, Cupar, Fife. For services to Medicine.
- Bernard Robert Hewins, Group Scout Leader, Amblecote, West Midlands. For services to Scouting.
- Muriel Hewitt. For services to the Electricity Industry.
- Kathleen Teresa Joan Hinde. For services to the community in the Vale of Glamorgan.
- Joan Hinnigan, Secretary, Manx Music Festival. For services to the community on the Isle of Man.
- Florence Winifred Hobson. For services to the Police.
- Cyril Hodgson. For services to the Royal British Legion in Cumbria.
- Gerald Laurence Holbrook. For services to the Newspaper Industry.
- Veronica Holder. For services to Mentally Handicapped People, especially MENCAP, in Cardiff.
- Kenneth Robert Hollingsworth. For services to the National Union of Mineworkers.
- Stuart Eastwood Holt, Head of Building Surveying Services, Staffordshire Moorlands District Council. For services to the Construction Industry and Building Control.
- Myra Horder. For services to the Citizens Advice Bureau in Portsmouth, Hampshire.
- Lieutenant Commander Gordon Alfred George Horn. For services to the Royal Navy and Royal Marine Branch and Special Duties Officers' Benevolent Fund.
- Jane Isabella Horn, JP, Chair, Cardigan House and Ripon House Voluntary managed Probation Hostels. For services to the Probation Service in West Yorkshire.
- Alan John Horner. For services to the Rossington Colliery, RJB Mining plc.
- Frank Ralph Howe. For services to disabled people and to the community in Colchester, Essex.
- Barbara Hughes, lately Vice-Principal, Coleg Powys. For services to Education in Powys.
- David William Gethin Hughes. For services to Music in Wales.
- Leslie Mark Hughes. For services to Association Football.
- Peter Henry Hunt. For services to Public/Private Sector Relations.
- Valerie Ann Hunt, Revenue Officer, Her Majesty's Board of Inland Revenue.
- James Henry Hunter, Senior Agricultural Officer, Scottish Office.
- Michael David Hunter, General Medical Practitioner, Shetland. For services to Health Care.
- William Alexander Hunter. For services to the Boys' Brigade.
- Lal Hussain. For services to Community Relations in Sutton, Surrey.
- Maurice Arthur Hutson, Executive Chairman, Parker Plant Ltd. For services to the Mechanical Engineering Industry.
- Stanley Henderson Inniss, JP. For services to the Caribbean and wider community in Huddersfield, West Yorkshire.
- Margaret Irving, Theatre/Out Patient Sister, Lawson Memorial Hospital, Golspie. For services to Health Care and to the community.
- Lena Jackson. For services to Cancer Charities.
- Annand Prakashkaur Jasani. For services to the Asian Community in Wales.
- Hilda W. Jeffrey. For services to the WRVS and to the community in Edinburgh.
- William Alfred Jenkins, Director, Flat Roofing Contractors' Advisory Board. For services to the Construction Industry.
- Peter Allison Jerrome. For services to the Petworth Society, West Sussex.
- Patricia Ruth Jeskins, lately Head of Classics, Taunton's College, Southampton, Hampshire. For services to Education.
- Michael Eccles Jimdar, Administrative Officer, Criminal Injuries Compensation Authority, Home Office.
- Andrew Johansson. For services to the Guide Dogs for the Blind Association.
- Eleanor Mary Stewart John, JP. For services to Winchester Cathedral, Hampshire.
- Jean Mary Johnson. For services to the Parkinson's Disease Society.
- Zena Johnson. For services to the British Red Cross Society in Gloucestershire.
- Edmund Alexander Johnston. For services to the Dairy Industry and to the community.
- Peter Harry Johnston, Senior Probation Officer, West Yorkshire Probation Service. For services to the Resettlement of Offenders and to the Victims of Crime.
- William Rankin Johnston. For services to the Royal British Legion.
- Thomas Llewellyn Jones. For services to Agriculture and to the community in West Wales.
- Ronald Sidney Major Jones, Head, Customer Operations HMG Business, GKN Westland Helicopters Ltd. For services to the Helicopter Industry.
- The Reverend Stanley Owen Jones, Chaplain, RAF Benson. For services to the RAF.
- Tecwyn Jones. For services to the community, especially Music, in Mid-Wales.
- Achhar Ram Kaushal. For services to Community Relations in Lancashire.
- Velma Maureen Keating. For services to the Cub Scout Movement in Lancaster.
- Elizabeth Edgar Keir. For services to the Multiple Sclerosis Society in Perth.
- Derek Alfred Kelly, Managing Director, Derek Kelly Turkeys. For services to the Farm Fresh Poultry Industry.
- Jean Kennedy. For services to Public Records in Norfolk.
- Robert Agnew Kerr, Trade Union Side Secretary, Scottish Airports Ltd, British Airports Authority. For services to Aviation.
- Leslie Keyte, Member, OFWAT Customer Service Committee, Wessex. For services to Water Consumers.
- Mohammed Yakub Khan, JP, Higher Executive Officer, Companies House, Department of Trade and Industry.
- Monawar Khan, General Medical Practitioner, Lambeth, Southwark and Lewisham, London. For services to Medicine.
- Robin Julian Khan, Chief Conservation Ranger, Forestry Commission.
- The Reverend Sarah Kilbey. For services to Deafened and Hearing Impaired People in Edinburgh and the Lothians.
- Ferguson King, Rivers Operative, Environment Agency. For services to the community in Northumbria.
- Reginald George King, Chairman, Albyn Housing Society Ltd., Invergordon, Ross-shire. For services to the Scottish Federation of Housing Associations.
- Sewa Singh Kohli. For services to Community Relations in Glasgow.
- Edward Alexander Kotlewski, Retained Sub-Officer, Fife Fire and Rescue Service. For services to the Fire Service.
- Anthony Felix Lackner, Clerk, Romney Marsh Levels Internal Drainage Boards. For services to Land Drainage.
- Valerie Ann Laird, lately Senior Personal Secretary, Ministry of Defence.
- John Curnow Laity. For services to the community in Penzance, Cornwall.
- Valerie Lake, Midwife, Hartlepool and East Durham NHS Trust. For services to the Baby Bereavement Support Group.
- Patricia Margaret Larby. For services to the Commonwealth Nurses Federation.
- Anne Theresa Lavelle. For services to the Police.
- Peter Lavine, Sub-Officer, West Yorkshire Fire and Civil Defence Authority. For services to the Fire Service and to the community.
- Terence Laybourne, Chef. For services to the Restaurant Trade in Northumberland.
- Jurat Mazel Joan Le Ruez. For services to the community on Jersey.
- Andrew Richard Leal, Head of Open and Flexible Learning, Plymouth College of Further Education, Devon. For services to Open Access Education.
- Alan Lee. For services to the Scout Association in Greater Manchester.
- James Leighton. For services to Association Football.
- Major Brian Archibald Scott Leishman. For services to Tourism in Edinburgh.
- Brenda Elizabeth Leonard. For services to the community in Kendal, Cumbria.
- Pauline Leslie, Revenue Officer, Her Majesty's Board of Inland Revenue.
- Cyril Kenneth Lewis. For services to Campanology and to the community in Altrincham, Cheshire.
- Gwendoline M. Lewis. For services to the community in Monkton Farleigh, Wiltshire.
- Joan Lingard, Author. For services to Children' Literature.
- David James Lloyd. For services to Local History and to the community in Ludlow, Shropshire.
- Gerald Charles Lockyer. For services to the National Association of Retired Police Officers.
- George Glyn Scott Longstaff, lately Taxing Director, Lord Chancellor's Department.
- Maxwell Lowe, Senior Finance Assistant, St. George's Healthcare NHS Trust, St. George's Hospital, London. For services to Health Care.
- Charles William McCaughey Lowry, TD. For services to the Not Forgotten Association.
- June Patricia Luker, Records and Administration Manager, UK Atomic Energy Authority. For services to Records Management in the handling of Radioactive Waste.
- Martin Frederick Edward Lunn. For services to Astronomy and to the Yorkshire Museum.
- Roy Lunn. For services to Music and to the community in Cutgate, Lancashire.
- Kenneth Mackay, Master of Works, the Royal Highland Agricultural Society of Scotland. For services to Agriculture.
- Donald J. Macmillan. For services to the community in the Kyle of Lochalsh.
- Robert Macpherson, Member, Farm Animal Welfare Council. For services to the Veterinary Profession and to Animal Welfare.
- Patrick Lawrence Magee. For services to the community.
- Robert Eamonn Magee. For services to the Fire Service.
- John Peter Magennis. For services to Chemistry and to Industrial Relations.
- Anthony John Mallard. For services to the community in Guildford, Surrey.
- Kathleen Mary Manning, Administrative Officer, Companies House, Department of Trade and Industry.
- Arthur James Mervyn Mansell, DSC. For services to Ealing Cricket Club and to Youth Cricket in Middlesex.
- Daphne Marche. For services to the Grace Project and to the Afro Caribbean community in North London.
- Albert Sutcliffe Marshall, JP, Member, Todmorden Town Council. For services to the community in Todmorden, West Yorkshire.
- Margaret Dora Marshall, lately Assistant to the Inspector of Regimental Colours. For services to Her Majesty's Forces.
- William Stuart Marson, General Medical Practitioner, Lambeth, London. For services to Medicine.
- The Reverend James Smiley Martin. For services to Mentally Handicapped People.
- Samuel Ernest Howard Martin, Voluntary Observer, Meteorological Office, Ashover, Chesterfield, Derbyshire.
- Ronald William Mason. For services to the community in Hampton-in-Arden, Staffordshire.
- Jeanette Mary Matthews, Senior Support Administrator, Track Engineering, London Underground Ltd. For services to Health and Safety.
- Ena Maxim. For services to the Soldiers', Sailors' and Airmen's Families' Association in Northamptonshire.
- William Godfrey McCann. For charitable services to Health Care.
- Janet Hughes McCathie, Chairman, Riding for the Disabled, Guernsey. For services to disabled people.
- Sheila Attracta McCaul. For services to Education.
- William Clifford McCord. For services to Medicine and to the community.
- George Henry McCreedy, Senior Youth and Community Worker, Prudhoe High School, Northumberland. For services to Young People.
- Michael Frederick McCrow, Head, Customer Support, Matra BAe Dynamics (UK) Ltd. For services to Customer Relations.
- Anne Marshall McDonald. For services to Remploy in Clydebank.
- Annie Elizabeth Eleanor McDougle. For services to the community, especially the Citizens Advice Bureau, in Northallerton, North Yorkshire.
- Lilian McGurk. For services to the All England Netball Association.
- Alexander James McKenzie, Detective Sergeant, Metropolitan Police. For services to the Police.
- Spencer McManus, General Manager, Network Services, London Underground Ltd. For services to Public Transport in London.
- Francis David McMullen. For services to Young People.
- John Moncur McNeill. For services to the community in Wester Hailes, Edinburgh.
- Mary Josephine McPhillips. For services to the British Red Cross Society.
- Finola Mary Carmen McQuade. For public service.
- Alec George Gardner-Medwin, DFC. For services to the Stanley Spencer Art Gallery, Cookham, Berkshire.
- Alan John Melrose, Environmental Control Manager, Manchester Airport. For services to Environmental Technology.
- Elizabeth Alma Melville. For services to Young People.
- David Miles. For services to the Derngate Housing Society and to the community in Northampton.
- Gwendoline Dora Miles. For services to the Basildon and Thurrock General Hospitals NHS Trust.
- Cecile Monique Milton. For services to the community in Elsted, West Sussex.
- Dennis Walter Mitchell. For services to Training in the West Midlands.
- Gillian Margaret Mitchell, Administration Manager, British Constructional Steelwork Association. For services to the Construction Industry.
- Shirley Moore. For services to the WRVS in Essex.
- John Arthur Morgan, Director, Train Maintenance Services Division, Adtranz. For services to the Railway Industry and to the community in Cheshire.
- Patricia Irwin Morgan, JP. For services to the community, especially the Magistracy, in Buckingham.
- Elizabeth Laura Morhange, Range D, Her Majesty's Treasury.
- Elizabeth Clare Morley, lately Support Grade 1, Highways Agency, Department of the Environment, Transport and the Regions.
- Philip Cyril Morris. For services to OXFAM.
- Walter Morrison. For services to the community in Corkerhill, Glasgow.
- Vicki Mossie, Manager, Probation Office, Manchester Crown Court. For services to the Rehabilitation of Offenders.
- Robert Innes Mowat. For services to the Lhaidhay Croft Museum, Dunbeath.
- George Robert Munro, Chief Steward, Caledonian MacBrayne. For services to the Transport Industry.
- Senga Munro, Senior teacher with responsibility for Traveller Education, Fife Council. For services to Education.
- The Reverend William Albert Murphy. For services to Prisoner Welfare.
- Sheila Napier. For services to the community in Dundee.
- Bhopinder Singh Naru. For services to community Relations in Newcastle upon Tyne.
- Audrey Needham, Member, Board of Visitors, Her Majesty's Young Offenders' Institution Huntercombe. For services to Prisoner Welfare.
- Kathleen Neville, Projects Manager, Her Majesty's Board of Inland Revenue.
- Paul William Newark, lately Sub-Officer, Buckinghamshire Fire and Rescue Service. For services to the Fire Service.
- Bessie McKee Newham. For services to the community, especially the WRVS, in Whitley Bay, Tyne and Wear.
- Carol Ann Newmam, Registry Supervisor, Home Office.
- Jean Marion Ann Nichols. For services to the community in Kingsand, Cornwall.
- David Laurence Nicholson, lately Customer Services Manager, Employment Service, Department for Education and Employment.
- Alan Edward Nicol. For services to Community Drama in Scotland.
- David Ralph Nicolson, Crofter and Grazing Clerk, Shetland. For services to Agriculture.
- Mavis Joan Nixon, Local Officer 2, Department of Social Security.
- David Michael Norman. For services to Young People in Leeds, West Yorkshire.
- Ian Albert Norman. For services to the community in Speldhurst, Kent.
- Jean O'Loughlin, JP. For services to the community in Middleton, Manchester.
- Owen O'Neil. For services to Horticulture in North Wales.
- Daniel O'Shea. For services to War Pensioners in Lancaster.
- John Joseph O'Sullivan, Fire Protection Manager, British Airways plc. For services to the Aviation Industry and to the Environment.
- Roy Oakley, Prison Officer, Her Majesty's Prison Stoke Heath.
- Surinder Mohan Ojha, Team Leader, Her Majesty's Customs and Excise.
- Gordon Frederick Osborne, Spearfish Afterbody Design Manager, GEC-Marconi plc. For services to the Defence Industry.
- Edward Owen, Manager, St Mungo's Hostel, Wandsworth. For services to the Rehabilitation of Offenders.
- Michael Barry Owers. For services to the community, especially Rutland Water Rescue Service, in Oakham, Rutland.
- Graeme Henry Pagan. For services to the Scottish Solicitors' Will Aid Scheme.
- Francis Bruce Wyndham Parker. For services to the community in Chipping Norton, Oxfordshire.
- Patricia Marian Parker. For services to the community, especially Marie Curie Cancer Care, in Dorking, Surrey.
- John Stephen Parkins, Executive Officer, Pay and Industrial Relations Division, Department for the Environment, Transport and the Regions.
- John Dennis Parr, Member, Winwick Parish Council. For services to the community in Winwick, Cheshire.
- David John Parsons. For services to Golf for Disabled People.
- Elizabeth Parsons. For services to the John Taylor Hospice, Birmingham.
- Manharlal Purshottam Patel, Chief Warder, National Gallery.
- Isabelle Mary Paterson. For services to the community in West Linton, Peeblesshire.
- James Paul, Assistant Head Teacher, Castlemilk High School, Glasgow. For services to Education and to School's Football.
- Anthony Pearce, Auxiliary Coastguard in Charge, Her Majesty's Coastguard, St. Davids and Sub Officer in charge, St. Davids Fire Station. For services to Safety at Sea and to the Fire Service.
- David Pearce, Social Worker. For services to the community in Dorset.
- Elizabeth Anne Pearson, JP. For services to the National Blood Service in Chipping Sodbury, Bristol.
- Jacqueline Shirley Peglitsis, Personnel Unit Business Manager, Her Majesty's Customs and Excise.
- Fabiano Bonifacio Pereira, Administrative Officer, Highways Agency, Department of the Environment, Transport and the Regions.
- Jack Perry, lately Training Officer, Nexus (Tyne and Wear Metro PTE). For services to the Rail Industry.
- Catherine Jane Pettis. For services to the Volunteer Bureau Movement.
- Michael James Petty. For services to Librarianship and to Local Studies in Cambridgeshire.
- Joan Edith Philpott, Administrative Officer, Department for Education and Employment.
- Esther Ida Phorson, Administrative Officer, Department of the Environment, Transport and the Regions.
- Jean Dorothy Pickett. For services to the Millbrook and Maybush Youth Club, Southampton, Hampshire.
- Barbara Pickles, Head, Freshfield Nursery School, Stockport, Cheshire. For services to Nursery Education.
- David Lloyd Pike. For services to the community in Sidbury, Devon.
- Rose Winifred Pitman. For services to Faith in Action in Telford, Shropshire.
- Peter John Plant, Insecticides Manufacturing Manager, Zeneca Agrochemicals. For services to the Chemical Weapons Convention.
- The Reverend Michael Lionel Plaskow. For services to disabled people and to the Jewish Community in Woodside Park, London.
- Ellison Alfred Platt, Deputy Director of Operations and Director of Publishing Services, Open University. For services to Higher Education.
- Irene Lilian Nelder Pollard, Clerk, Service Institute Fund, RAF Locking. For services to the Royal Air Force.
- Myrtle Pollard. For services to the community especially the RNLI and OXFAM, in Liskeard, Cornwall.
- Eileen Ponting. For services to the community in Swindon, Wiltshire.
- Edwina Mary Pope. For services to the community, especially Stag Lane Middle School, in Edgware, Middlesex.
- Margaret Elizabeth Pottage. For services to the community, especially the Moorlands Nature Reserve, in York.
- Beryl Lloyd Powell. For services to the community, especially Cancer Research, in Mold, Flintshire.
- John Prentice Shearer Poyner. For services to the community in Stourbridge, West Midlands.
- Colin Price. For services to the Celynen Silver Band, Newbridge.
- Norman Frank Price, Construction Superintendent, Cleveland Structural Engineering Ltd, Darlington. For services to Bridge Building.
- Edith Mary Jean Procter. For services to the Women's Land Army Society.
- Stephen Pullen. For services to Judo for Disabled People.
- Mollie Turner Quirk. For services to Education and to the community on the Isle of Man.
- Robina Anne Penelope Rafferty, Director, CHAS (Catholic Housing Aid Society). For services to Homeless People.
- Sally Ramsden. For services to the community in Bridlington, East Riding of Yorkshire.
- Bruce Ramsay, Senior Technical Officer, Greater Manchester Police. For services to the Police.
- James Cuthbert Ramsey, lately Governor 5, Her Majesty's Prison Long Lartin.
- David John Randolph, JP, DL. For services to the Cotswold Community Trust and to the community in Wiltshire.
- William Rawling. For services to Agriculture and to the community in Ennerdale, West Cumbria.
- Rex Raven Rayner, lately Post Design Support Manager, GEC Alsthom Paxman Diesels. For services to the Royal Navy.
- Roy Read. For services to the community on the Bloomsbury Estate, Birmingham.
- John Stanley Redpath. For services to the community.
- R. Nalda Rees. For services to the community in Pontarddulais, Swansea.
- Anthony Hallett Rhodes, Head of Transport Engineering, University of Newcastle upon Tyne. For services to Highways Engineering and voluntary organisations.
- Doreen Majorie Rhodes, lately Higher Executive Officer, Ministry of Defence.
- Lily Richards. For services to the Welsh Language and to the community in Caerphilly, South Wales.
- Stanley George Richards. For services to the community in Bridgnorth, Shropshire.
- James Daley Ritchie, lately Officer Instructor, Her Majesty's Prison, Perth.
- Cedric Geoffrey Roberts, Voluntary Observer, Meteorological Office, West Midlands.
- David John Roberts, Manager, UK Passports Agency, Home Office.
- John Lloyd Roberts, Warden, Snowdonia National Park. For services to the Environment.
- Lynda Mary Roberts, Teacher, Goodnestone Primary School, Canterbury, Kent. For services to teaching and special educational needs.
- Peter Frederick Roberts, JP. For services to the Magistracy in Cheshire.
- Raymond Joseph Roberts, Chairman, Goldwell (Hair Cosmetics) Ltd. For services to the Hairdressing Industry.
- Alice Robinson. For public service.
- Augustine Alberto Robinson, Managing Director, Gus Robinson Developments Ltd. For services to Business and to the community in County Durham.
- David Allan Robinson, TD, JP, DL. For services to the community in Woking, Surrey.
- Robert John Roch. For services to the community in Angle, Dyfed.
- Edward Rodgers. For charitable services to the community in Birmingham.
- John Millar Roger. For services to the community in Arncroach, Fife.
- Barbara Joan Ronchetti. For services to the Worcester Archaeological Society and to the community.
- Roderick Thomson Ross, Area Community Support Manager, Stirling Council. For services to Youth and Community Education.
- Bryan John Rowe, Manager, Assynt Centre, Lochinver. For services to Elderly People.
- Pamela Rowland, Higher Executive Officer, Department of Social Security.
- Robert Hendry Roy, Electrician, UK Atomic Energy Authority. For services to Industrial Safety and to the SSPCA.
- Mary Adams Russell. For public service.
- Rose Russell. For public service.
- Roy Frederick John Russell. For services to the community in Wolverhampton, West Midlands.
- Dora Jessie Saint, Author. For services to Literature.
- Jane Sargeant. For services to Livestock Owners in the West Midlands.
- Barry John Sargent, Firefighter, London Fire and Civil Defence Authority. For services to the Fire Service and to the community.
- Daman Lal-Sarin. For services to Rotary International.
- Matthew John Saunders. For services to the Ancient Monuments Society and to Architectural Conservation.
- James Owen Savers, JP, DL. For services to Crime Prevention in Clydebank.
- Vincent Charles Seaman. For services to the Royal Air Forces Association in Doncaster.
- Florence Sehman, Executive Officer, Department of Social Security.
- Mary Jocelyn Selson. For services to Music Aid.
- Ronald Edwin Shapland. For services to Forestry.
- Annie Shaw. For services to the community in Rothesay, Isle of Bute.
- Catherine Johnston Shearer. For services to the community in Glasgow.
- George John Shearing. For services to the Colliers Wood Community Association, Surrey.
- Diane Katherine Simpson, Section Head, Department of Health.
- Duncan Simpson, Founder and Editor, Grampian Tape Service for the Blind. For services to Blind People.
- Maurice Skilton, lately Vice Chairman, East Sussex County Council. For services to the community in East Sussex.
- Ronald Scott Skinner. For services to Local Authority Revenue and Rating.
- Julia Slotopolsky Slater. For services to the community in Castlemilk, Glasgow.
- Elizabeth Jane Young Smart. For services to the community in Ancrum, Jedburgh.
- Alan Trevis Smith, lately Member, Inland Waterways Amenity Advisory Council. For services to Inland Waterways, particularly in the West Midlands.
- Colin Stewart Smith, Founder, Toot Hill Dance Band. For services to Music.
- Dennis Brian Smith. For services to the community in Tunbridge Wells, Kent.
- Joan Smith. For services to the community in Stockport, Cheshire.
- Patricia Elsie Smith. For services to the Humberside Training and Enterprise Council and to Investors in People.
- Peter Smith, lately head of public relations, Association of Metropolitan Authorities. For services to Local Government.
- Roger Eirian Smith. For services to Industrial Relations in North Wales.
- Captain Sydney Thomas Smith. For services to Mariners and the Marine Profession.
- Sylvia Smith. For services to the community, especially Young People, in Sussex.
- Colin John Smithen, Chairman, Capel-le-Ferne Parish Council. For services to the community in East Kent.
- Carole Smithies, Purchasing Manager, Vickers Defence Systems. For services to the Defence Industry.
- Miriam Sopel, JP. For services to the Magistracy and to the community in Inner London.
- Geraldine Souter, Audit Support, Her Majesty's Customs and Excise.
- Simon Springett, Head, Abbots Langley School, Hertfordshire. For services to Education.
- William Jackson Wylie Steele, Foreman, Forestry Commission.
- Matthew Stephenson. For services to Swallow Hotels.
- Muriel Elizabeth Stevenson. For public service.
- Sarah Stone. For services to the League of Jewish Women in Cardiff.
- John Christopher Strachan, RD. For services to the Port of London.
- Dorothy Stutt. For services to the community in Beverley, East Riding of Yorkshire.
- Darshan Kumar Suri, JP, General Medical Practitioner, Haringey, London. For services to Medicine.
- Brian Sykes, Building Superintendent, Joseph Priestley College, Leeds. For services to Education.
- John Michael Alan Tamplin, TD. For services to the Order and Medals Research Society.
- Frederick John Taylor. For services to the Protection of Intellectual Property.
- Graham Vincent Taylor, Coxswain Mechanic, Filey Lifeboat, Royal National Lifeboat Institution. For services to safety at Sea.
- Joy Vera Taylor, lately School Crossing Patrol, Southwark, London. For services to Road Safety.
- Sydney Taylor. For services to the National Association of Retired Firefighters.
- Wendy Elizabeth Taylor. For charitable services to the community in Nantwich, Cheshire.
- Harold Temblett. For services to the Far East Prisoner of War Association.
- Kenneth Sidney Thatcher, TD. For services to disabled people in Swansea.
- Alison Margaret Thomason. For services to the Mobility of Disabled People in Bury, Lancashire.
- Agnes Cunningham Lambie Thomson. For services to the community in Sorn, Ayrshire.
- Michael James Thresher, lately Borough Treasurer and Head of Corporate Resources, Taunton Deane Borough Council. For services to Local Government in Taunton, Somerset.
- Heather Todd. For public service.
- Ian Joseph Topham, Member, Boroughbridge Town Council. For services to the community in Boroughbridge, North Yorkshire.
- Thomas Topham. For services to the Submarine Old Comrades Association.
- Ian Torrance, Chief Photographer, The Daily Record. For services to Photographic Journalism.
- Walter George Townsend. For services to the Salvation Army in Kingston upon Thames, Surrey.
- Richard George Townshend, Sector Manager, Coastguard Agency, Department of the Environment, Transport and the Regions.
- Rose Ann Towse, Deputy Director of Nursing, Mayday Hospital, Croydon. For services to Health Care.
- Brian George Turnbull, Sub-Officer (Retained), County Durham and Darlington Fire and Rescue Brigade. For services to the Fire Service.
- Stanley Tuthill. For services to the Federation of Master Builders and to Training in the Building Industry.
- Edward Tuton. For voluntary services to Railway Pensioners.
- Mabel Kathleen Twist. For services to the Royal British Legion and for charitable services.
- Jane Claire Valerie Uff, lately Curator, Chequers. For services to Chequers.
- Walter Umpleby. For services to Conservation in the Yorkshire Dales (see New House Meadows, Malham).
- Joan le Gros Uzzell. For services to the Victim Support Scheme in Exeter, Devon.
- Philip James Vickers, Superintendent, Northamptonshire Police. For services to the Police.
- George Thomas Vidler, Administrative Officer, Employment Tribunals Service, Department of Trade and Industry.
- Jane Wade. For services to the community in Durham.
- Margaret Iona Letitia Wake-Walker, JP, DL. For services to the community, especially the Magistracy, in Chichester, West Sussex.
- Peter Geoffrey Ault Walker, JP. For services to the community in Llangollen, North Wales.
- Robert Walker. For services to the community, especially the Army Cadet Force, in Worthing, West Sussex.
- Shirley Walker, Home Care Worker, Devon County Council. For services to the community in Plymouth.
- Veronica Mary Wallace, Personal Assistant to the Chief Executive, Scottish Council Development and Industry. For services to Industry.
- Geoffrey Albert George Wallis. For services to the community, especially the Bells Piece Cheshire Home, in Farnham, Surrey.
- Alan Ware. For services to the Sea Cadet Corps in Haringey.
- Albert Waterfield, Director, Metrotec Training and Enterprise Council. For services to Training.
- Rita Watret, lately Personal Assistant to the Chairman and General Manager, Dumfries and Galloway Health Board. For services to Health Care.
- James Watson. For services to RAF Kinloss.
- Marjorie May Watson. For services to the Frank Knox Fellowships and to the Kennedy Memorial Trust.
- Philip Brian Weaver, Business Manager, Employment Service, Department for Education and Employment.
- George William Lorenzo Webster. For services to Swimming and to Life Saving in Lincolnshire.
- Margaret Weeks. For services to the Citizens Advice Bureau in Milton Keynes, Buckinghamshire.
- Barbara Wells, Chairman of the Governing Bodies, Robert Pattinson GM Comprehensive School and North Scarle Primary School, Lincolnshire. For services to Education and to the community.
- Christopher John Gordon-Wells, Organ Builder. For services to Music.
- Alan Frederick Westaway, Commissionaire, Rolls-Royce Military Aero-Engines Ltd. For services to Rolls-Royce and to the community in Bristol.
- Michael Henry Wheeler, lately Superintendent of Depot, Royal National Lifeboat Institution. For services to the RNLI.
- Ann Eleanor White, Administrative Office, Ministry of Defence.
- Phyllis Evelyn White. For services to the community in Oxford.
- Jacqueline Whiteley. For services to the Cub Scouts in Huddersfield.
- Doreen Mary Whitwell. For services to the community in Sunderland, Tyne and Wear.
- Terence John Wilding, Member, Swaffham Town Council and Breckland District Council. For services to the community in Norfolk.
- Colin Wilkinson, lately Head Caretaker, Norfolk School, Sheffield. For services to Education.
- John Herbert Willard. For conservation and restoration services to Museums.
- Barbara Williams. For services to the British Red Cross Society in North Wales.
- John David Williams. For services to Local Government and to the community in North Wales.
- Shirley Audrey Williams. For services to the British Red Cross Society in Northumberland.
- Leslie Williamson, Higher Telecommunications Technical Officer, Ministry of Defence.
- Stella Willing. For services to the Royal British Legion in South Humberside.
- Sister Anthony Wilson. For services to the Metropolitan Cathedral of Christ the King in Liverpool, Merseyside.
- Ian John Agnew Wilson. For services to the community.
- Professor Richard Christopher Lane Wilson, Member, Council of English Nature. For services to the promotion of Earth Sciences and Nature Conservation.
- Robert Trevor Wilson, Detective Constable, Metropolitan Police. For services to Dreamflight.
- William George Morrison Wilson, Customer Service Group Manager, Her Majesty's Board of Inland Revenue.
- Diana Rosalind Wincott, Principal, Guy's Hospital School of Dental Nursing, London. For services to Dentistry.
- James Edward Wood, lately Chief Designer, Sauer-Sundstrand Ltd. For services to Training in the Engineering Industry.
- Professor Patricia Jane Woodward, Professor Emeritus, University of Central England. For services to Higher Education.
- Neil Ross Workman, Honorary Secretary, Red Bay Lifeboat Station, Royal National Lifeboat Institution. For services to the RNLI.
- Michael Yallop, Field Welfare Officer, Automobile Association. For services to the Automobile Association.
- Kenneth Victor Young, Chief Security Officer, Department for Education and Employment.

Diplomatic Service and Overseas List

- David Elliot Balfour, Honorary Consul, Galapagos Islands, Ecuador.
- John Ballantine, Customs and Excise Branch, Gibraltar.
- Kenneth Lawrence Bandey, Consular Correspondent, Cochin, India.
- Stephanie Louise Bee, Third Secretary, Foreign and Commonwealth Office.
- John Douglas Binks, Chief Assistant Secretary (Defence Projects), SARG Security Bureau, Hong Kong.
- Karen Christine Blackburne, locally engaged Consular Officer, Kano.
- Eugene Algernon Blakeney. For public service in Bermuda.
- Jacqueline Joan Bonney. For services to leprosy treatment in India.
- Raymond Preston Brownell, Project Manager, Foreign and Commonwealth Office.
- Edward Arthur George Coles, Consular Agent, Monrovia.
- Andrea Stephanie Frances Doolan. For services to Gurkha family resettlement in Nepal.
- Joan Kathleen Fallert. For services to the British community in Chicago.
- Mary Elizabeth Fenton. For services in the US to tourism in Britain.
- Clarence Levi Flowers. For public and community service, Cayman Islands.
- Frederick Gentile, Honorary Consul, Brindisi.
- Nidia George. For community services, British Virgin Islands.
- Colin James Kerr Glass, lately Deputy High Commissioner, Freetown.
- Timothy William Grandage. For services to the welfare of street children, India.
- David Peter Hart, Security Officer, British High Commission, Islamabad.
- David Harwood, Honorary Consul, Libreville, Gabon.
- Avril Margaret Isobel (Penny) Hay, Research Officer, Foreign and Commonwealth Office.
- Julia Frances Hodgson. For services to the British School in Ankara.
- Doreen Elena Hogg. For welfare services to the community, Buenos Aires.
- Janet Catherine Holdsworth. For services to education in China and Laos.
- David John Hutchinson. For services to British-Colombian trade.
- John Mitchell Inglis, Honorary Consul, Calais.
- Maurice Elwyn Jenkins. For services to British-Japanese relations.
- Colonel Charles William David Harvey-Kelly. For welfare services to the ex-service community in the Republic of Ireland.
- Dr. Irene Leeser. For medical services in Andhra Pradesh, India.
- Rodney Charles Little. For services to British-Nigerian trade.
- Major Joseph Gabriel Lynch, Commanding Officer, Royal Montserrat Defence Force.
- Shirley Mair Mantle, lately Personal Assistant to HM Ambassador, Lisbon.
- Kenneth Mason. For community and charitable services in Nairobi.
- Stanley Jeremy Moulden. For services to education and charitable work in Peru.
- John Edward Munn. For services to the Royal British Legion, Boulogne.
- Gratia Philomena Marie Blossom Nair, RVM, locally engaged Accommodation Officer, British High Commission, Dar es Salaam.
- Jean Elsie Obi. For services to the blind in Nigeria.
- Sheila Irene Pacheco, locally engaged Vice-Consul, San Jose.
- Ann Rosemary Palmer. For services to women's and children's welfare in Kenya.
- John Gemmell Paton, lately Committee Secretary, Executive Secretariat, NATO.
- Doreen Eva (Dreena) Rogers. For charitable services in Bahrain.
- Richard Rust, Government Higher Scientific Officer.
- Peter Henry Ryder. For services to British shipping overseas, latterly in Japan.
- Jane Senior, Second Secretary and Nursing Officer, British High Commission, Islamabad.
- Beryl Eileen Smart, Government Cleaner.
- Allan Constable Smith, Consular Correspondent, Francistown, Botswana.
- Frederick Stephen Smith. For services to the Royal British Legion, Buenos Aires.
- Wendy Smith, Personal Assistant to HM Consul, Cape Town.
- Helena Joan Spruce. For services to the study of Falkland Islands history.
- Jane Ann Standley. For services to radio journalism.
- Rosemary Phyllis Stapley. For services to health care and literacy in India.
- Joan Taylor. For charitable services, latterly in Brasilia.
- Jeanette Kay Thomas, Headmistress, St. Maur International School, Yokohama.
- Eric Arthur Watts. For charitable services in Africa, latterly in Kenya.
- Charmaine Penelope Westwood, IBRD/IADB Liaison Officer, HM Embassy, Washington.
- Joseph John Williams. For charitable services in Mozambique.
- Lorraine Teresa Williams. For charitable services in Mozambique.
- Patricia Margaret Winfield, lately Senior Secretary, NATO Secretariat.
- Margaret Woodley. For services to the Anglican Church, Corfu.
- William James Russell Yates, Oxfam Special Envoy, Burundi.

=== Companions of Honour ===
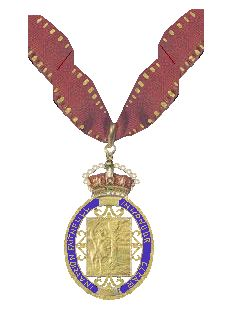
Riband and badge of the Companions of Honour

The Order of the Companions of Honour was founded by King George V in June 1917, as a reward for outstanding achievements in the arts, literature, music, science, politics, industry, or religion.

- Professor Eric John Ernest Hobsbawm, Emeritus Professor of Economic and Social History, University of London. For services to History.
- The Right Honourable Christopher Francis Patten, former Governor and Commander-in-Chief, Hong Kong. For public service.

=== Royal Red Cross ===
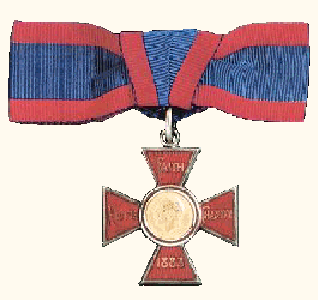
The Royal Red Cross for exceptional services in military nursing

The Royal Red Cross is a military decoration awarded for exceptional services in military nursing. There are two classes of medal.

==== First Class ====
- Major Wendy Jane Spencer (510882), Queen Alexandra's Royal Army Nursing Corps.

=== Queen's Police Medal ===
The Queen's Police Medal (QPM) is awarded to police officers in the United Kingdom and Commonwealth for distinguished service or gallantry.

England and Wales

- Paul Acres, Assistant Chief Constable (Designate), Merseyside Police.
- Bertram Finnie Aitchison, lately Commander, Metropolitan Police.
- Frank Bellwood, Detective Sergeant, Durham Constabulary.
- Peter Ryan Boatman, Inspector, Northamptonshire Police.
- Paul Norman Canning, Inspector, British Transport Police.
- Michael Jon Foster, Detective Chief Superintendent, West Midlands Police.
- Michael Anthony Gains, Constable, North Yorkshire Police.
- Colin Horton, Superintendent, Kent County Constabulary.
- Rodney Peter Lind, Assistant Chief Constable (Designate), Wiltshire Constabulary.
- John Mertl, Constable, Essex Police.
- Barrie Robin Meyers, Superintendent, Metropolitan Police.
- Stephen Charles Pilkington, Commander (Designate), Central Area, Metropolitan Police.
- Phillip Samuel Pyke, Chief Superintendent, Devon and Cornwall Constabulary.
- Keith Rodgers, lately Assistant Chief Constable (Designate), Humberside Police.
- Julian Russell Smith, lately Superintendent, Nottinghamshire Constabulary.
- David William Thursfield, Assistant Chief Constable (Designate), West Mercia Constabulary.
- Francis Wakem, lately Chief Superintendent, Wiltshire Constabulary.
- Bryan Frederick Wren, Detective Sergeant, Metropolitan Police.

Scotland

- George Paul Macdonald, Assistant Chief Constable, Strathclyde Police.
- James Alexander Mackay, Assistant Chief Constable, Tayside Police.
- Vallance Robert Robison, Assistant Chief Constable, Dumfries and Galloway Constabulary.

Northern Ireland

- Thomas Milne Barbour, Detective Superintendent, Royal Ulster Constabulary.
- John Robert Cecil Morrison, Superintendent, Royal Ulster Constabulary.

Overseas

- Francis (Frank) Hooper, Commissioner of Police, Montserrat.

=== Queen's Fire Service Medal ===
The Queen's Fire Service Medal is awarded to members of the fire services in the United Kingdom and Commonwealth of Nations for distinguished service.

England and Wales

- John Bryan Acey, lately Divisional Officer 1, Humberside Fire and Rescue Service.
- Alan Ronald House, Deputy Chief Fire Officer, Hampshire Fire and Rescue Service.
- Raymond Hughes, Assistant Chief Fire Officer, Tyne and Wear Metropolitan Fire Brigade.
- Peter James Jones, Chief Fire Officer, Gloucestershire Fire and Rescue Service.
- Malcolm Alastair Stewart, Station Officer, Surrey Fire and Rescue Service.

Scotland

- Gerald Austen Ronald Dunn, Assistant Firemaster, Dumfries and Galloway Fire Brigade.
- Donald MacInnes, Assistant Firemaster, Lothian and Borders Fire Brigade.

== Barbados ==
=== Order of the British Empire ===
==== Commanders (CBE) ====
- Trevor Robinson. For services in the development of a Ship's registry for Barbados.

== Grenada ==
=== Order of the British Empire ===
==== Commander (CBE) ====
- Dr. James De Vere Pitt. For services to education.

==== Officer (OBE) ====
- Dr. Ethelstan Philbert Friday. For services to medicine.

==== Members (MBE) ====
- Tyrone Harbin. For services to sport.
- Eli Llewelyn Noel Peter. For public service.

=== British Empire Medal (BEM) ===
- Clayton James De Roche. For services to the fishing industry.
- Agnes Nesta Pascal. For services to social work.

== Papua New Guinea ==
=== Knight Bachelor ===
- Leith Reinsford Steven Anderson, CBE. For community and public service.

=== Order of Saint Michael and Saint George ===
==== Companions (CMG) ====
- Alan Ine'e Oaisa, ISO. For public and foreign service.
- The Honourable Bill J. W. Skate, MP. For services to the community, public and politics.

=== Order of the British Empire ===
==== Knights Commander (KBE) ====
- Michael Roger Bromley. For services to commerce and industry.
- Makena Viora Geno, CBE. For services to the auditing and accounting profession and Public Service.

==== Commanders (CBE) ====
Military Division

- Brigadier General Leo Raphael Nuia, OBE, Papua New Guinea Defence Force.

Civil Division

- Karo Vagi. For services to the community and the administration of justice.

==== Officers (OBE) ====
Military Division

- Colonel Steve Reginald Renagi, Papua New Guinea Defence Force.

Civil Division

- Dike Kara. For public service.
- Mathias Kauage. For services to culture and tourism.
- Martin Loi. For services to the community and the administration of justice.
- Peter Allan Lowing. For services to the community and charity.
- Norman Steele. For community and public service.
- Victor Wong. For services to the community and country.

==== Members (MBE) ====
Military Division

- Major Unjo Ukengo, Papua New Guinea Defence Force.

Civil Division

- Mesulam Aisoli. For services to the rural community and education.
- Marcus Bayam. For services to the community and the administration of justice.
- Inspector Lomas Ubega Bedura. For services to the Royal Papua New Guinea Constabulary.
- Veali David. For services to Air Niugini and the government.
- Ging Tetaclase Dawidi. For public service.
- Simon Mow Kueng Foo. For services to Air Niugini and the country.
- Doura Frank. For services to the Government Printing Office and the government.
- Warkia Baul Kaminiel. For services to local government.
- Christopher George Marlow. For public services, especially to the Forest Authority.
- Regget Marum. For services to the community and the administration of justice.
- Pastor Kundi Pok. For services to religion and the community.
- Manu Kevau Raho. For services to the community and the National Capital District Commission.
- Munangkec Tinning. For public service.
- Tipo Vuatha. For public service.

=== Imperial Service Order (ISO) ===
- Tom Moses. For public and community service.

=== British Empire Medal (BEM) ===
- Rebeca Anda. For services to religion and the community.
- Bia Doru. For services to the community.
- Paul Elope. For public service.
- Constable Wagumisi Kamo. For services to the Royal Papua New Guinea Constabulary.
- Phineas Kayaroa. For public service.
- Constable Noha Kjmi. For services to the Royal Papua New Guinea Constabulary.
- Kawagle Kondi. For community service.
- Gibus Korea. For services to the Health Department.
- Kunai Nanawing. For public services.
- Charles Francis Wahii Nolih. For services to the community and to the administration of justice.
- Councillor Yak Wandaki. For services to the community.

=== Queen's Police Medal ===
- Chief Inspector Martin Powis, Royal Papua New Guinea Constabulary.

== Solomon Islands ==
=== Order of the British Empire ===
==== Officers (OBE) ====
- Toswell Kaua. For services to education and public administration.
- David Ernest Kera. For services to commerce and public administration.
- David Dongalio Oeta. For political services to Malaita Provincial Government.

==== Members (MBE) ====
- Haikiu H. Baiabe. For services to the Seventh Day Adventist Church.
- Benjamin Faamauri. For services to commerce.
- Josaiah Philip Riogano. For services to the Provincial Government and Lands administration.

== Tuvalu ==
=== Order of the British Empire ===
==== Officer (OBE) ====
- The Honourable Vasa Founuku Vave. For community, public and political services.

==== Members (MBE) ====
- Amasone Kilei. For public service and services to the community and education.
- The Reverend Eti Kine. For services to the community and the Church.

=== British Empire Medal (BEM) ===
- Taulima Filisai. For services to the community, especially in the field of public health.
- Sualo Malofelo. For services to the community and the Nanumaga Island Council.
- Mono Manalea. For services to the community and the Vaitupu Island Council.

== Saint Vincent and the Grenadines ==
=== Order of the British Empire ===
==== Officer (OBE) ====
- Inez Delpesche. For services to the community.
- Karl Errol Vernon John. For public service.

== Belize ==
=== Order of the British Empire ===
==== Commanders (CBE) ====
- Manuel Sosa. For public service.

==== Officer (OBE) ====
- The Right Reverend Bishop Osmond Peter Martin. For services to education and the Church.

==== Members (MBE) ====
- Wilhelmina Erlean Casasola. For services to education and the community.
- Maud Agatha Williams. For services to education.

== Antigua and Barbuda ==
=== Order of the British Empire ===
==== Members (MBE) ====
- Ezekel Lionel Michael. For public service.
- Joslyn Melita Williams. For services to music.

=== British Empire Medal (BEM) ===
- Genevieve Candace Beazer. For public service.

== Saint Christopher and Nevis ==
=== Order of the British Empire ===
==== Officer (OBE) ====
- George Percival John Walker. For services to religion.

==== Members (MBE) ====
- Denzil Bruce Renwick. For services to commerce, culture and the community.
- Sarah Pearline Warner. For services to education.
