= William J. L. Baillie =

Scottish painter (1923–2011)

William James Laidlaw Baillie, CBE, PPRSA (19 April 1923 – 21 May 2011) was a Scottish artist, specialising in watercolour paintings. He served as president of the Royal Scottish Academy from 1990 to 1998. He had taught in schools in Edinburgh (1951–1960) and was a lecturer at the Edinburgh College of Art (1960–1988), before retiring from teaching to dedicate himself to his art.

In the 1998 New Year Honours, Baillie was appointed Commander of the Order of the British Empire (CBE) "for services to the arts".
