= Martin Lunn =

Martin Frederick Edward Lunn MBE FRAS is a British astronomer and curator.

== Biography ==
Lunn gained a degree in astrophysics from the Open University before working for the Civil Service. In 1989 he joined the Yorkshire Museum as Honorary Curator of Astronomy. Lunn was awarded a MBE for services to astronomy in the 1998 New Year Honours.

In 2013 he presented a broadcast for Stargazing Live from the Yorkshire Museum. Lunn has served on the council of the Society for the History of Astronomy.

=== Publications ===
- Lunn, M. 1995. The Earth From Space. London, BBC.
- Lunn, M. 1996. Earth and Space' (BBC Fact Finders). London, BBC.
- Lunn, M., Potter, T., and Bishop, K. 1997. Earth and Beyond (BBC Fact Finders). London, BBC.
