= Advertising Standards Board of Finance =

The Advertising Standards Board of Finance (ASBOF) collects a voluntary levy on advertising costs to fund the Advertising Standards Authority (ASA). Typically, the levy is 0.1% on non-broadcast costs (e.g. 0.1% of the cost of placing a newspaper advertisement), and 0.2% of the cost of a Mailsort contract. ASBOF collects the levy and then passes the funds on to the ASA to ensure that the ASA are unaware of who has contributed to its funding. This avoids the question of money influencing the ASA's decision in its rulings.

All advertising charges (except classified lineage and semi-display) are subject to a 0.1% Advertising Standards Board of Finance (asbof) levy, payable by advertisers to help finance the self-regulatory system administered by the Advertising Standards Authority.

The levy will be collected from advertisers by advertising agencies or, in case of direct accounts, by media owners.

In December 2009 after 18 months' consultation with the industry and ASA, it was agreed that the levy would be expanded to include paid search advertising. However, unlike traditional media, the digital expansion of the levy is voluntary , which was a concession negotiated by Google under the leadership of Matt Brittin as the then managing director for Google UK.
