= Patricia Collarbone =

British educationist, writer and speaker

Dame Patricia Collarbone DBE FRSA (born July 1947) is a British educationist, writer and speaker. She was the founding director of the London Leadership Centre and of Creating Tomorrow Ltd, a consultancy focused on leadership development and delivering self-sustaining change programmes. She was made a Dame Commander of the Order of the British Empire in 1997 for services to Education.

In 2004, she was asked by the Labour Government to lead a major workforce modernisation programme in all 22,000 schools in England. The success of the project led to her being asked to manage further system-wide changes such as Every Child Matters. She has held the post of Director of Leadership programmes at the National College of School Leadership, Executive director of the National Remodelling Team and a director at the Training and Development Agency.

During her consultancy and advisory career she has advised a range of organisations both in the UK and overseas, notably leading the development of the Principal Standard in Australia.

She is a fellow of the Royal Society of Arts. She has been a visiting professor at Canterbury Christ Church University and a visiting fellow at the Institute of Education.

== Education and early career ==
Collarbone was educated at Spalding high school for girls followed by a Teacher Training course at College of All Saints Tottenham, London. She went on to complete a BA Hons at Middlesex Polytechnic in the Sociology of Education. In 1995 she completed an MBA in Education at Leeds Metropolitan University. In 1999, she completed her Doctorate on Educational leadership at the University of Humberside and Lincolnshire.

In 1968, she began her teaching career at Haggerston School in the London Borough of Hackney where, having held a number of positions of responsibility, she became Headteacher in 1990 until December 1996.

== Government advisor ==
Collarbone served as a member of the Department for Education and Employment's advisory committee from 1997. She was a member of Hackney school Improvement Team, appointed by Secretary of State in 1997/8.

In 1998, she was appointed as a Special Advisor to the 9th Education Government Select Committee investigating the role of Headteacher. In the same year she was appointed as a Special Advisor to the Department for Education and Science on headship and leadership aspects linked to the 1998 Green Paper Teachers Meeting the Challenge of Change (1998-2001). In 1999 she led the review of the leadership programme for serving headteachers NPQH.

In 1999, she was included in Good Housekeeping's 100 Most Influential Women in Britain.

In 2007, she chaired The Care Matters working group for DfES producing the Best Practice in Schools paper to help inform the Care matters: Time for Change White Paper.

== London Leadership Centre ==
In 1996, Collarbone established the London Leadership Centre at Institute of Education UCL Institute of Education, University of London and in January 1997 she took up the post of Founding Director. She led the development of the National Professional Qualification for Headteachers between 1999 and 2001. A move away from a competence model, which places emphasis on minimum standards outputs, to a competency-based approach described as what "a successful person characteristically brings to a specified task or role". She has since advised a number of countries in the development of standards.

2002/3 she directed the London Leadership Centre consortium which managed the Transforming the School workforce Pathfinder on behalf of the DES. The success of this led to her being asked to be the Director of the National Remodelling Team (NRT)in 2003, a three-year programme to transform the way school staff work. Each school developed a "change team" to help introduce new ideas. Ofsted in a review of these initiatives "found that the reforms have resulted in a revolutionary shift in the culture of the school workforce".

=== National College for School Leadership ===
Between 2002- 2005 Collarbone was seconded to The National College for School Leadership as Director of Leadership Programmes where she led the development and delivery of a portfolio of leadership programmes including the Leadership programme for Serving Headteachers, Middle Management, Governors and Executive Leaders.

=== Training and Development Agency for Schools ===
In 2005-06, together with the NRT she transferred as a director to the Training and Development Agency for schools.

== Consultancy roles ==
=== Education Change Associates ===
In 2006 she set up Education Change Associates Ltd a private consultancy firm. She advised on the design of a professional qualification for educational leaders in the Cayman Islands and advised the Thai ministry contributing to the development of a leadership development framework.

=== Creating Tomorrow Ltd ===
In 2008, she cofounded Creating Tomorrow Ltd a consultancy with the specific aim of developing cost effective and sustainable change programmes that any organisation could use. In 2010, she led an intensive and collaborative process to develop the Australian Professional Standard for Principals involving over 550 stakeholders as well as national and international research. The standard provides a framework for what principals should know, understand and do to succeed as a school leader. The success of this led her to be asked to develop leadership profiles - actions that can be implemented depending upon context, career stage and capabilities.

She closed Creating Tomorrow in 2018 to concentrate on her charitable interests sitting on a number of educational trusts.

== Honours ==
In 1998 Collarbone was made a Dame Commander of the Order of the British Empire the equivalent of a knighthood for women for services to education. In March 2006 she was appointed Visiting Professor in Faculty of Education at Christ Church Canterbury University.

== Publications ==
=== Books ===
- Collarbone, P. (1987) Lower School Humanities. Geography Schools Industry Project, Oxford University.
- Collarbone, P., Connolly, J., Scriviner, C. and Westaway, J. (1988) Urban Patterns and Processes Heinemann Geographical Association Award Winner, best publication of the year.
- Collarbone, P., Connolly, J., Scriviner, C. and Westaway, J. (19981988) Heinemann Rural Urban Links.
- Barber M., Collarbone P., Cullen E., Owen PD. (1994) Keele University Two Towns Project Evaluation Report.
- Collarbone, P. (1996) A Journey of a 1,000 Miles – the Haggerston Journey. A chapter in Reengineering and Total Quality in Schools, Editors: Davies B. and West-Burnham J.
- Stoll, L., Bolam, R. and Collarbone, P. (2002). Leading for Change: Building Capacity for Learning. A chapter in the International Handbook of Educational Leadership and Administration (Section editor: Phil Hallinger).
- Collarbone, P. and West-Burnham, J., (2008). Understanding Systems Leadership: Securing excellence and equity in education. London: Network Continuum
- Collarbone, P., (2009) Creating tomorrow: Planning, developing and sustaining change in education and other public services. London: Network Continuum
- Collarbone, P. and Edkins, S. (2013) Autonomy and Professional Courage: Emotional and Political Aspects of Change. A chapter in Sustainable School Transformation: An Inside-Out School Lead Approach. Edited by David Crossley: Bloomsbury
- Collarbone, P. and Edkins, S. (2021) Change @ Work: A proven process that addresses the rational, emotional and political challenges of creating a better tomorrow. Kindle Direct Publishing

=== Papers and presentations ===
- Collarbone, P. (1997) The Lead Learner. London Regional News.
- Various articles in Leading Edge (1997 to 2002), the Journal of the London Leadership Centre.
- Billingham, M. and Collarbone, P. (1998) Research Matters: Leadership and Our Schools in Research Matters.
- Collarbone, P. (1998) Dolphin or Dodo: A note for LEAs. Education Review. Volume 12, No. 1.
- Collarbone, P. (1999) Schools of the Future and their Leadership: A Blueprint for Success. An RSA lecture. Collarbone P. Volume 3, Number 1.
- Collarbone, P. and Shaw. R. (1999) The National College for School Leadership. Head of Review, NAHT.
- Collarbone, P. (1999) Education in the United Kingdom: Issues for Headteachers. Hot Topics, Australian Council for Educational Illumination.
- Collarbone, P. (2001) Leadership Programme for Serving Headteachers: A Review. Nottingham: National College for School Leadership.
- Collarbone, P. (2001). The Governing Body and NPQH. In Governors’ Agenda, Issue Number 19, Coventry: CEDC
- Halpin, D., Collarbone, P., Earley, P., Evans, J. and Gold A., (2002) Conducting online focus groups in research on school leadership: a methodological discussion. For publication in the BELMAS magazine “Management in Education”.
- Collarbone, P., Earley, P., Evans, J., Gold A. and Halpin, D., (2002). The Current State of School Leadership in England. A research paper commissioned by the DfES.
- Collarbone, P., Earley, P., Evans, J., Gold A. and Halpin, D., Values-driven Leadership in Education: Evidence from Ten Case Studies of “Outstanding” School Principals. A paper to be presented at the Annual Meeting of the American Educational Research Association, April 2002.
- Collarbone, P. and Southworth, G., (2004). Learning to Lead: NCSL’s Strategy for Leadership Learning. Nottingham: National College for School Leadership
- Collarbone, P., (2005). Remodelling Leadership. An address to the North of England Conference
- Collarbone, P., (2005). “Touching Tomorrow: Remodelling in English Schools” in The Australian Economic Review, Vol 38, No 1. Melbourne: Blackwell Publishing
- Collarbone, P. (2005) Shaping the future - Leading Personalised Learning in Schools - Helping individuals grow
- Collarbone, P., (2005). Education 2010: A World of Difference. The Annual Lecture at the Institute of Education, Manchester Metropolitan University.
- Collarbone, P., (2006). Learning and Teaching in 2020. Paper prepared for the DfES
- Collarbone, P., (2006). The School Workforce in 2020. Paper prepared for the DfES
- Collarbone, P. (Chair), (2007). Best Practice in Schools. Nottingham: DfES Publications
- Collarbone, P. (2012) Leading Change, Changing Leadership Part 1 Centre for Strategic Education Occasional Papers
- Dinham, S. Collarbone, P. Evans, M. Mackay, A. (2013) The Development, Endorsement and Adoption of a National Standard for Principals in Australia. Educational Management Administration & Leadership, vol. 38, 5: pp. 644–646
- Collarbone, P. (2015) Leading Change, Changing Leadership Part 2 Centre for Strategic Education Occasional Papers
