= Gillian Pugh =

Dame Gillian Mary Pugh DBE

Chief Executive of Coram Family
- In office 1997 – 25 April 2005

Dame Gillian Mary Pugh, DBE was Chief Executive of Coram Family, England’s oldest children’s charity, until her retirement on 25 April 2005, after eight years of service.

She has been a pioneer in contemporary childcare services and an important contributor to Government thinking on the education, social care and health services support for disadvantaged children and their families.

During her time at Coram Family the charity:

- Increased the number of children, young people and families benefiting from Coram Family’s services from 300 to over 6,000 a year
- Repositioned the organisation and brought its work into the forefront of Government thinking
- Established a separate charitable trust to enable the public to have access to the charity’s art collection at the Foundling Museum
- Developed the Coram Community Campus as an integrated early childhood service, which has been designated “early excellence centre”
- Won Charity of the Year award (children and youth category) in 2003

Gillian Pugh was elected Chair of the National Children's Bureau (NCB) in November 2006 and is also a Member of the Children’s Workforce Development Council (CWDC). In 2009, she became President of the National Childminding Association.

She was awarded an honorary Fellowship by the University of Chichester in 2010.

She is a member of the Family Law Review Panel.
