= Jenny Roberts =

English probation officer (1940–2010)

Jenny Roberts

Jenny Susan Margaret Roberts, OBE (12 August 1940 – 19 November 2010) was an English probation officer and writer. She served as the Chief Probation Officer for Hereford and Worcester. Roberts introduced new concepts on how women offenders were treated in the UK justice system which went on to influence women's probation services in Australia, the Irish Republic and Northern Ireland. She was the first woman to chair the Association of Chief Officers of Probation (ACOP) in 1992.

== Early life ==
Jenny Roberts was born Jenny Susan Margaret Dunton on 12 August 1940 in Sevenoaks, Kent. She was the eldest child of Albert Henry Dunton, insurance clerk, and his wife, Joyce Monica, née Cheeseman, and she had an younger brother, Simon. After the family moved to Bexhill-on-Sea, she attended Bexhill girls' grammar school.

== Education and first probation career ==
Dunton studied modern languages at King's College London which included a year at the Sorbonne. She initially worked for the BBC and then the Royal College of Physicians. She then took a one-year postgraduate course in social work at the University of Nottingham, qualifying in 1966. She got a job at the Nottinghamshire probation service in 1967.

Whilst at Nottingham, Dunton got involved in developing community service in the area. She was also involved in setting up a workshop, Beaver, which provided offenders with the opportunity to develop basic skills. More than half of those who attended found work within six months, and the reoffending rate was halved.

In 1969, Dunton married Ronald Thomas West, a fellow social worker, and she left the service in 1970 to have her first child, Sophie. Sophie had cerebral palsy and other neurological conditions requiring additional care. The marriage to West broke down and Dunton became a single parent living on state benefits.

== Chief Probation Officer and work with women offenders ==
In 1979, Dunton moved to Staffordshire as assistant chief probation officer. She also married Colin Roberts, a university lecturer in criminology at the University of Manchester and subsequently the University of Oxford.

In 1983, Roberts was appointed chief probation officer in the Herefordshire and Worcestershire Probation Service. She established a number of major initiatives, including a young offender project and the first computerized offender management system. She also created a separate offender programme for women.

Roberts was a member of Lord Carlisle's committee on the parole system, whose report in 1988 contributed to changes introduced within the Criminal Justice Act of 1991. In 1989, Roberts established the 'What Works' conferences on probation and prison reform.

She was appointed chair of the Association of Chief Officers of Probation (ACOP) in 1992–3, and was the first woman to hold the position.

In 1995 Roberts became joint editor, with Colin Thomas, of a new journal about the management of probation work, Vista (now Eurovista). She remained its editor until her retirement.

Roberts also worked with the Prison Reform Trust's commission on justice for women, and directly supported the work of the women's policy team in the Home Office. Her work and writings about women in the criminal justice system influenced Baroness Corston's report, Women with Particular Vulnerabilities in the Criminal Justice System. In 1997 she received the OBE for her distinguished service to probation.

Roberts wrote numerous journal articles and contributed chapters to more than a dozen books on probation and criminology. She also lectured on probation issues at the Institute of Criminology, University of Cambridge, for a period.

== Retirement and Asha centres ==
Roberts retired as Chief Probation Officer in 2001 but remained active in the field. In 2003 she edited a book on probation work in European Union accession countries and was a key presenter at the Council of Europe criminological research conference in Strasbourg.

Roberts also established the Asha centres in Worcester and Kidderminster in 2002. These centres offer a women-centred safe environment, and services including advice, counselling, employment training, education, recreation, and health care. women on probation are encouraged to use the services.

In 2007, Roberts co-authored 'Provision for women offenders in the community' for the Fawcett Society.

== Death ==
Roberts died of spindle cell cancer of the lung on 19 November 2010.
