= List of dames commander of the Order of the British Empire =

Below is a list of dames commander of the Order of the British Empire from the order's creation in 1917 until the present day. Honorary dames commander of the Order of the British Empire can be found at Category:Honorary Dames Commander of the Order of the British Empire.

== 1910s ==
- 1917:The Marchioness of Dufferin and Ava; The Lady Houston; Sarah Lees; The Marchioness of Londonderry; Edith Balfour Lyttelton; The Lady Pentland; The Marchioness of Willingdon
- 1918: Eva Anstruther; The Lady Arnott; The Duchess of Atholl; The Lady Bell of Rounton Grange; Maud Bevan; Maud Burnett; The Marchioness of Bute; The Lady Davidson; The Lady Donner; Alice Godman; The Lady Jekyll; Adelaide Livingstone; Ethel Locke King; The Lady Lugard; Nellie Melba; Margaret Pryse-Rice; Clarissa Reid; The Viscountess Ridley; The Countess Roberts; The Lady Sclater; The Lady Smith-Dorrien; Janet Stancomb-Wills; The Countess Waldegrave; Mary Webster
- 1919: Rachel Crowdy; The Countess of Darnley; Blanche Gordon Lennox; Helen Gwynne-Vaughan; The Countess of Harrowby; The Lady Henderson; The Lady Monro; The Lady Mount Stephen; The Lady Northcote; The Lady O'Dwyer; Sarah Oram; Florence Simpson

== 1920s ==
- 1920: Georgiana Buller; Clara Butt; Alice Chisholm; The Dowager Countess of Eglinton; The Countess of Gosford; Catherine Hunt; The Countess of Leicester; The Lady Melchett; The Lady Oliver, Ethel Pearson; Una Pope-Hennessy; The Dowager Viscountess Rhondda; Louise Samuel; Ethel Shakespear; The Lady Talbot of Malahide; Meriel Talbot; Catherine Wingate; Sophia Wintz
- 1921: Adelaide Anderson; The Lady Dixon
- 1922: The Viscountess Greenwood; Ethel Smyth; Margaret Greville
- 1923: The Lady Cox; The Lady (Barbara) Strickland
- 1924: Henrietta Rowland Barnett; The Viscountess Bridgeman; Janet Campbell; Beatrix Lyall; Rani Shiv Kunwar Sahiba, Senior Rani and Rani-Regent of Narsinghgarh
- 1925: Emma Albani; Louisa Aldrich-Blake; The Lady Cook; Louisa Lumsden; The Lady St Helier; Anne Smith; Mary Wills
- 1926: Agnes Hunt; Madge Kendal; Maude Lawrence; Jessie Phipps; Mary Scharlieb
- 1927: Edith Antrobus; The Countess of Cavan; The Dowager Countess of Jersey; Emily Penrose; The Countess of Stradbroke; The Viscountess Templewood
- 1928: The Duchess of Bedford; Frances Dove; Eadith Walker; Elizabeth Wordsworth
- 1929: The Lady Brittain; The Lady Findlay; The Lady Humphrys; Laura Knight; Louise McIlroy; Bertha Phillpotts

== 1930s ==
- 1930: The Lady Bailey
- 1931: Joanna Cruickshank; Maharani Lakshmi Devi of Dhar; Sarah Mair; Sybil Thorndike
- 1932: Margaret Tuke; Edith Brown
- 1933: The Lady Denman; The Viscountess Simon
- 1934: Elizabeth Cadbury; Alicia Lloyd Still
- 1935: Annie Jean Connor; Constance D'Arcy; Maria Ogilvie Gordon; The Lady MacDonald; Rosalind Paget; The Duchess of Portland
- 1936: The Duchess of Abercorn; Regina Evans; The Lady Gilmour; Christabel Pankhurst
- 1937: The Lady Anderson; Geraldine Cadbury; Mary Gilmore; Ellen Pinsent; The Lady Rhys-Williams; The Lady (Margaret) Strickland; Marie Tempest; Violet Wills
- 1938: The Countess of Elgin; Florence Lambert; Gwendoline Trubshaw
- 1939: The Lady Hillingdon; Ellen Musson

== 1940s ==
- 1941: The Viscountess Craigavon; Myra Hess; The Marchioness of Reading; The Lady Stanley; Irene Vanbrugh
- 1942: Katharine Jones
- 1943: Emily Blair; Lilian Braithwaite; Anne Loughlin; Ethel Walker
- 1944: Lilian Barker; Doris Beale; Jane Trefusis Forbes
- 1945: Joan Marsham; Vera Laughton Mathews; Katherine Watt
- 1946: Edith Evans; The Countess of Limerick; The Duchess of Richmond; Mary Welsh; Leslie Whateley
- 1947: Madeline Brock; Gertrude Cosgrove; Evelyn Fox; Matilda Goodrich; Caroline Haslett; Emmeline Tanner; The Lady Walwyn
- 1948: The Baroness Sharp; Louisa Wilkinson
- 1949: Harriette Chick; Myra Curtis; Anne Curwen; The Lady Meynell; Dehra Parker; Felicity Peake; Mary Smieton; Gladys Taylor; Mary Tyrwhitt

== 1950s ==
- 1950: Marjorie Cox; Frances Farrer; Adeline Genée, Grace Kimmins; Olive Wheeler; Jocelyn Woollcombe
- 1951: Ellen Acton; Florence Cardell-Oliver; Helen Cargill; Mary Daly; Elizabeth Gilmer; Florence Hancock; Hilda Lloyd; Lillian Penson; Anne Thomson; Ninette de Valois
- 1952: Florence Bevin; Kathleen Courtney; The Viscountess Davidson; Mary Lloyd; Marjorie Maxse
- 1953: The Baroness Asquith of Yarnbury; Cynthia Colville; Mary Coulshed; Catherine Fulford; Elisabeth Kelly; Flora MacLeod of MacLeod; Enid Russell-Smith
- 1954: Lilian Bromley-Davenport; Helen Gillespie; Edith Sitwell
- 1955: Mabel Brookes; Elizabeth Cockayne; The Countess of Rosebery; Nancy Salmon; The Baroness Ward of North Tyneside; Roberta Whyte
- 1956: The Countess of Albemarle; Peggy Ashcroft; Margot Fonteyn; Kathleen Lonsdale; Mary Railton; Hilda Ross; Lucile Sayers
- 1957: Anne Bryans; The Countess De La Warr; Annabelle Rankin; Nancy Robertson; Janet Vaughan
- 1958: Mary Henrietta Barnett; The Baroness Elliot of Harwood; Monica Golding; Mary Latchford Kingsmill Jones; Rose Macaulay; The Duchess of Portland; Maggie Teyte, Alice Mary Williamson
- 1959: The Viscountess Brookeborough; Ruth Buckley; Mary Colvin; Rebecca West

== 1960s ==
- 1960: Judith Anderson; Alice Berry; The Baroness Brooke of Ystradfellte; The Lady Herring; Elizabeth Hoyer-Millar; Alice Lowrey, Merlyn Myer; Flora Robson
- 1961: Kitty Anderson; Elizabeth Couchman; The Baroness Hornsby-Smith; Anne Stephens
- 1962: Anne Godwin; Edith Pitt; Marie Rambert; Jean Roberts; Barbara Salt; Eva Turner
- 1963: Joyce Bishop; The Lady Bromet; Barbara Cozens; Jean Davies; Honor Fell; Alicia Markova; The Lady Murdoch
- 1964: Veronica Ashworth; Jean Rivett-Drake; Margaret Shepherd; The Baroness Vickers; Eileen Younghusband
- 1965: The Lady Adrian; Florence Cayford; Mabel Crout; Sibyl Hathaway; Joan Henderson; Barbara Hepworth; Elizabeth Lane; Catherine Scott; Margot Turner; The Lady Wakehurst
- 1966: Elsie Abbot; Margaret Drummond; Felicity Hill; Leah Manning; Ngaio Marsh; Annie McEwen; Ruth Railton; Grace Tebbutt; Mabel Tylecote
- 1967: Margery Corbett Ashby; The Countess of Brecknock; Ivy Compton-Burnett; Gladys Cooper; Helen Gardner; Pauline Giles; Mabel Miller; Beryl Paston Brown; Margaret Rutherford; Ivy Wedgwood; Albertine Winner
- 1968: Zara Bate; Annis Gillie; Isabel Graham Bryce; Mary Green; Muriel Powell; Kathleen Raven; Hilda Stevenson; Muriel Stewart; Dorothy Tangney; Veronica Wedgwood; Ethel Wormald
- 1969: Rita Buxton; Hilda Bynoe; The Lady Carey Evans; Mary Cartwright; The Lady Gibbs; Ella Macknight; Daphne du Maurier; Anna Neagle; Sister Mary Regis; Lucy Sutherland; Elizabeth Yarwood

== 1970s ==
- 1970: Elizabeth Ackroyd; Mary Anderson; Te Atairangikaahu; Sara Barker; The Lady Bottomley; Margaret Cole; Marion Kettlewell; Margaret Miles; Peggy van Praagh
- 1971: Kate Campbell; Agatha Christie; Mabel Coles; The Lady Cramer; Adelaide Doughty; Kathleen Ollerenshaw
- 1972: Nancy Buttfield; Cicely Courtneidge; Unity Lister; The Lady Plowden; Diana Reader Harris; Freya Stark; Susan Walker
- 1973: The Lady Bolte; Sylvia Crowe; Kathleen Kenyon; Sister Mary Leo; Marjorie Williamson
- 1974: Josephine Barnes; Emma Clode; The Baroness Denington; Phyllis Frost; Joan Hammond; Rose Heilbron; Albertha Isaacs; The Baroness Jackson of Lodsworth; The Viscountess Macmillan of Ovenden; Margot Smith
- 1975: The Lady Angliss; Helen Blaxland; Bridget D'Oyly Carte; Joyce Daws; Frances Gardner; Wendy Hiller; Margaret Kidd; Ruth Kirk; Vera Lynn; Dorothy Rees; Betty Ridley
- 1976: Janet Baker; Edith Burnside; Violet Dickson; Joan Evans; Monica Gallagher; Elizabeth Hill; Ada Norris
- 1977: Geraldine Aves; The Lady Browne; Patricia Mackinnon; Rosemary Murray; Iris Origo; Marjorie Parker; Cecily Pickerill; Winifred Prentice; Frances Yates
- 1978: Isobel Baillie; Mary Durack; Audrey Reader; Joan Howard Roberts; Sheila Sherlock; Meere Uatioa
- 1979: Mary Austin; Margaret Booth; Sister Philippa Brazill; The Baroness Butler-Sloss; Elizabeth Coker; Gracie Fields; The Baroness Hart of South Lanark; Naomi James; Doris Johnson; Daphne Purves; Joan Sutherland; Margaret Weston

== 1980s ==
- 1980: Rachel Cleland; Miriam Dell; Phyllis Friend; Margaret Guilfoyle; Ida Mann; Raigh Roe; Cicely Saunders; The Lady Soames; Ann Springman
- 1981: Beryl Beaurepaire; Margaret Blackwood; Mary Bridges; Whina Cooper; Pamela Hunter; Celia Johnson; Ruby Litchfield; Betty Paterson; The Baroness Pike; Shelagh Roberts; Margaret Scott
- 1982: Doris Fitton; Elisabeth Frink; Catherine Hall; Roma Mitchell; Kiri Te Kanawa; Alice Wedega; Ida Yonge
- 1983: The Marchioness of Anglesey; Rosamund Holland-Martin; Leonie Kramer; Olga Uvarov
- 1984: The Baroness Seccombe; The Lady Tilney; Catherine Tizard; The Baroness Warnock
- 1985: Jean Herbison; The Lady Jenkins of Hillhead; The Baroness Knight of Collingtree; Alison Munro; Joan Varley
- 1986: Vivienne Boyd; Peggy Fenner; Dorothea Horsman; Christian Howard; Gwyneth Jones; Merle Park; Simone Prendergast; Barbara Shenfield; Rosa Tokiel
- 1987: Elizabeth Chesterton; Marie Clay; Dorothy Fraser; Penelope Jessel; Mary Kekedo; Elizabeth Maconchy; Joan Metge; Iris Murdoch; Sheila Quinn
- 1988: Barbara Clayton; Judi Dench; Beryl Grey; Rosalinde Hurley; Elaine Kellett-Bowman; Laurie Salas
- 1989: Silvia Cartwright; The Baroness Dunn; The Baroness Emerton; The Baroness Fookes; Margaret Fry; Barbara Goodman; Rosemary Rue

== 1990s ==
- 1990: Josephine Abaijah; Venetia Blaize; Joyanne Bracewell; The Baroness Hylton-Foster; The Baroness Lloyd of Highbury; Maggie Smith; Miraka Szászy; Rachel Waterhouse; Dorothy Winstone
- 1991: Barbara Cartland; Stella Casey; Eugenia Charles; The Lady Digby; Gwen Ffrangcon-Davies; Jane Gow; Malvina Major; The Lady Porter; The Lady Ridsdale; Lucie Rie; Sue Tinson; Margaret Turner-Warwick
- 1992: Jocelyn Barrow; Ann Ebsworth; Rangimārie Hetet; Edna Lewis; Moura Lympany; Wendy Mitchell; Shirley Oxenbury; Anne Poole; Norma Restieaux; Angela Rumbold; Elisabeth Schwarzkopf; The Baroness Serota; Janet Smith
- 1993: The Lady Arden of Heswall; Ann Ballin; Patricia Bergquist; Catherine Cookson; Mary Corsar; Pat Evison; Mary Glen-Haig; Phyllis Guthardt, Louise Henderson; Thora Hird; Dawn Lamb; Anne McLaren; The Lady Muldoon; Annette Penhaligon; Margaret Price; Muriel Spark; Heather Steel; Augusta Wallace
- 1994: Margaret Brain; The Baroness Byford; The Baroness Hale of Richmond; Marea Hartman; Georgina Kirby; Eileen Mayo; Diana Rigg; Gillian Wagner
- 1995: The Baroness Anelay of St. Johns; Elizabeth Clarke Anson; Josephine Barstow; Marjorie Bean; June Clark; Sister Pauline Engel; Elizabeth Esteve-Coll; Elizabeth Harper; The Lady Higgins; Mary Hogg; Rose Kekedo; Anne Salmond; The Lady Thorneycroft
- 1996: Fiona Caldicott; The 18th Baroness Darcy de Knayth; Jane Drew; The Baroness Fritchie; Felicity Lott; The Baroness Noakes; Antoinette Sibley; Gillian Weir
- 1997: Rachael Dyche; Deirdre Hine; Cleo Laine; Barbara Mills; Bridget Ogilvie; Joan Sawyer; Rosanna Wong
- 1998: Gillian Beer; Lorna Boreland-Kelly; Patricia Collarbone; Tamsyn Imison; Betty Kershaw; Helen Metcalf; Gillian Oliver; The Viscountess Runciman of Doxford; Veronica Sutherland; Mary Uprichard
- 1999: The Lady Black of Derwent; Lois Browne-Evans; A. S. Byatt; Diana Collins; Pauline Fielding; Mavis Grant; The Baroness Hallett; Norma Major; Yvonne Moores; Helen Reeves; Margaret Seward; Helena Shovelton; Lesley Southgate; Maureen Thomas

== 2000s ==
- 2000: Julie Andrews; Beryl Bainbridge; Shirley Bassey; Beulah Bewley; Jill Macleod Clark; Marie Descartes; Vivien Duffield; Anne Evans; Glynne Evans; Geraldine Keegan; Judith Kilpatrick; Patricia Morgan-Webb; Lorna Muirhead; Mary Peters; Anne Rafferty; Marlene Robottom; Miriam Rothschild; Steve Shirley; Patricia Symmonds; Elizabeth Taylor; Dorothy Tutin
- 2001: Ingrid Allen; Eileen Atkins; The Baroness Campbell of Surbiton; Wendy Davies; Karlene Davis; Jill Ellison; ~~Jean Else;~~ Julia Higgins; Sharon Hollows; Thea King; Sheila McKechnie; Sally Powell; Lesley Rees; Mary Richardson; Dela Smith; Marilyn Strathern; Janet Trotter
- 2002: Margaret Barbour; Laura Cox; The Baroness Deech; Catherine Elcoat; Judith Mayhew Jonas; Jessica Rawson; Janet Ritterman; Marjorie Scardino; Meg Taylor; Sheila Wallis
- 2003: Elizabeth Blackadder; Yve Buckland; Pamela Coward; Pauline Green; Louise Johnson; Helen Mirren; Elizabeth Neville; Anna Pauffley; Julia Polak; Ruth Robins; Anita Roddick; Rita Weller; Jenifer Wilson-Barnett
- 2004: Florence Baron; Enid Bibby; The Lady Brittan of Spennithorne; Alexandra Burslem; Hilary Cropper; Sandra Dawson; Jacqueline Docherty; Jane Goodall; Joan Harbison; The Lady Harris of Peckham; Patricia Hodgson; Elisabeth Hoodless; Olwen Hufton; Deirdre Hutton; Gillian Morgan; The Baroness Neuberger; The Lady Olivier; Denise Platt; The Lady Popplewell, Jane Roberts; Marion Roe; The Lady Ronson
- 2005: Carol Black; Maureen Brennan; Linda Dobbs; The Baroness Grey-Thompson; Kelly Holmes; The Lady Kidu; Ellen MacArthur; Mary Macdonald; Julia Macur; Sarah Mullally; The Lady Openshaw; Gillian Pugh; Nancy Rothwell; Jennifer Smith; Jean Thomas; Fanny Waterman
- 2006: Averil Cameron; Liz Forgan; Anna Hassan; Carole Jordan; Susan Leather; Julie Mellor; Janet Nelson; Daphne Sheldrick; Ruth Silver; Vivienne Westwood
- 2007: Jocelyn Bell Burnell; Yasmin Bevan; Marcela Contreras; Mary Douglas; Ann Dowling; Evelyn Glennie; Joan Higgins; Janet Husband; Mary Keegan; Barbara Kelly; Emma Kirkby; Ann Leslie; Mary Marsh; Mary Perkins; Josephine Williams
- 2008: The Baroness Bakewell; Christine Beasley; Hilary Blume; Lynne Brindley; Kay Davies; Margaret Drabble; Janet Finch; Clara Furse; Eleanor King; Donna Kinnair; Monica Mason; The Baroness O'Loan; Judith Parker; Sonia Proudman; Fiona Reynolds; Elizabeth Slade; Barbara Stocking; Mary Tanner; Jacqueline Wilson
- 2009: Jenny Abramsky; Sally Davies; Elizabeth Fradd; The Lady Gould of Brookwood; Barbara Hakin; Wendy Hall; Anne Owers; Linda Partridge; Philippa Russell; Rosalind Savill; Victoria Sharp; Joan Stringer; Mitsuko Uchida

== 2010s ==
- 2010: Valerie Beral; Claire Bertschinger; Monica Dacon; Nicola Davies; Athene Donald; The Baroness Eaton; Amelia Fawcett; Jacqueline Fisher; Janet Gaymer; Julia Goodfellow; Susan Ion; Barbara Monroe; Janet Paraskeva; Paula Rego; Alison Richard; Kathryn Thirlwall; Clare Tickell; Marcia Twelftree; Naila Zaffar
- 2011: Helen Alexander; Elish Angiolini; Patricia Bacon; Anne Begg; Ruth Carnall; Rosemary Cramp; Antonia Fraser; Susan John; Reena Keeble; Sally Macintyre; Beverley Lang; Jenni Murray; Felicity Palmer; Indira Patel; Anne Rafferty; The Lady Rees of Ludlow; Janet Suzman; Lucy Theis; The Lady Wallace of Saltaire; Harriet Walter
- 2012: The Lady Archer of Weston-super-Mare; Margaret Makea Karika Ariki; Glynis Breakwell; The Baroness Brown of Cambridge; Moira Gibb; Zaha Hadid; Judith Hill; The Baroness Jowell; Tina Lavender; Penelope Lively; Julie Moore; Sylvia Morris; The Baroness Neville-Rolfe; Joan Ruddock; Theresa Sackler; Janet Thornton
- 2013: Sarah Asplin; The Baroness Beckett; Janet Wolfson de Botton; Susan Bourne; Christine Braddock, Sally Coates, Sarah Cowley; Nicky Cullum; Diana Ellis; Nancy Hallett; Helen Hyde; Anne Mandall Johnson; Monica Joseph; Hermione Lee; Joan McVittie; Priscilla Newell; Vicki Paterson; Janice Pereira; Judith Rees; Carol Robinson; The Lady Rose of Colmworth; Dana Ross-Wawrzynski; Phyllis Somers; Sarah Storey; Angela Watkinson
- 2014: Geraldine Andrews; Kathryn August; Susan Bailey; Kate Barker; Maizie Barker-Welch; Colette Bowe; Rosemary Butler; Alison Carnwath; Sue Carr; Jessica Corner; Laura Davies; Celia Hoyles; Penelope Keith; Asha Khemka; Frances Kirwan; Elisabeth Laing; Angela Lansbury; Gillian Lynne; Louise Makin; Hilary Mantel; Maura McGowan; Nicola Nelson-Taylor; Frances Patterson; Alison Peacock; Shirley Pearce; Erica Pienaar; Dawn Primarolo; Seona Reid; Zandra Rhodes; Jennifer Roberts; Alison Russell; Pamela Shaw; Ingrid Simler; Julia Slingo; Rachel de Souza
- 2015: Frances Ashcroft; Annette Brooke; Sue Bruce; Victoria Bruce; Frances Cairncross; Bobbie Cheema-Grubb; Joan Collins; Kate Dethridge; Carol Ann Duffy; Oremi Evans; Anne Glover; Pippa Harris; The Baroness Hodge of Barking; Siobhan Keegan; Fiona Kendrick; Zarine Kharas; Juliet May; Denise McBride; Anne McGuire; Joyce Plotnikoff; Mary Quant; Esther Rantzen; Teresa Rees; The Baroness Shafik; Eileen Sills; Kristin Scott Thomas; Dianne Thompson; Marina Warner; Philippa Whipple; Glenis Willmott; Fiona Woolf
- 2016: Anita Allen; The Baroness Black of Strome; The Baroness Casey of Blackstock; Denise Coia; Polly Courtice; The Lady Davies; Caroline Dean; Anna Dominiczak; Lesley Fallowfield; Judith Hackitt; Alice Hudson; Nerys Jefford; Susan Jowett; Rotha Johnston; Frances Lannon; Christine Lenehan; Georgina Mace; Natalie Massenet; Carolyn McCall; Henrietta Moore; Finola O'Farrell; Julia Peyton-Jones; Siân Phillips; Heather Rabbatts; Benita Refson; Caroline Spelman; Glenys Stacey; Arabella Warburton; Margaret Whitehead; Penelope Wilton; Barbara Windsor; The Baroness Winterton of Doncaster
- 2017: Elizabeth Nneka Anionwu; Vera Baird; Inga Beale; Hilary Boulding; Carmen Callil; Sarah Connolly; Olivia De Havilland; Jessica Ennis-Hill; Amanda Fisher; Helen Fraser; Barbara Frost; The Baroness Grainger; Carolyn Hamilton; Jane Jiang; Parveen Kumar; Gwynneth Knowles; Ottoline Leyser; Theresa Marteau; The Baroness Morrissey; Clare Moulder; Patricia Routledge; Cilla Snowball; Angela Strank; Julie Walters; Caroline Leigh Watkins; June Whitfield; Anna Wintour; Amanda Yip
- 2018: Mary Beard; Janet Beer; Darcey Bussell; Hilary Chapman; Jane Dacre; Jacqueline Daniel; Louise Ellman; Pratibha Gai; Cheryl Gillan; Moya Greene; Susan Lesley Hill; Vivian Hunt; The Baroness Laing of Elderslie; Stella Manzie; Clare Marx; Angela McLean; Angela Pedder; The Lady Rice; Christine Ryan; Frances Saunders; Rosemary Squire; Emma Thompson; Janet Vitmayer; Cathy Warwick
- 2019: Madeleine Atkins; Glenda Bailey; Janet Bostwick; Sara Cockerill; Elizabeth Corley; Johannah Cutts; Cressida Dick; Jennifer Eady; Carolyn Fairbairn; Sarah Falk; Judith Farbey; The Baroness Foster of Oxton; Uta Frith; Jayne-Anne Gadhia; Ann Gloag; Marianne Griffiths; The Lady Havelock-Allan; Frances Judd; Julie Kenny; Christina Lambert; Sandra Lau; Lesley Lawson; Laura Lee; Nathalie Lieven; Louise Martin; Constance Mitcham; Mary Ney; Alison Nimmo; Ann Louise Robinson; Elan Closs Stephens; Karen Steyn; Justine Thornton; Sara Thornton; Rachel Whiteread

== 2020s ==
- 2020: Caroline Allen; The Baroness Benjamin; Mary Berry; The Lady Bichard; Muffy Calder; The Baroness Campbell of Loughborough; Siobhan Davies; The Baroness Gerada; Lynn Gladden; Teresa Graham; Victoria Heywood; Susan Elizabeth Hill; Elaine Inglesby-Burke; Diana Johnson; Donna Langley; Maureen Lipman; Olivia Newton-John; Magdalene Odundo; Cally Palmer; Linda Pollard; The Baroness Rafferty; Lesley Regan; Rose Tremain; Julia Unwin; Emma Walmsley; Sarah Whatmore; The Baroness White of Tufnell Park; Sarah Worthington
- 2021: Helen Atkinson; Karin Barber; Phyllida Barlow; Catherine Bingham; Imogen Cooper; Angela Eagle; Uta Frith; Sarah Gilbert; Jane Glover; Rachel Griffith; Sheila Hancock; Irene Hays; Meg Hillier; Sandra Horley; Jean Kekedo; Andrea Leadsom; Prue Leith; Sara Llewellin; Caroline MacEwen; Caroline Mason; Pat McGrath; Carol Propper; Arlene Phillips; Maura Regan; Anne Richards; Jo da Silva; Alwen Williams
- 2022: The Lady Arbuthnot of Edrom; Kelyn Bacon; The Lady Cannadine; Rowena Collins Rice; Vivienne Cox; Flora Duffy; Naomi Ellenbogen; The Baroness Foster of Aghadrumsee; Christine Gilbert; Sue Gray; Clare Grey; Nia Griffith; Jenny Harries; Sylvia Heal; Deborah James; Fionnuala Jay-O'Boyle; Karen Jones; The Lady Kenny; Sara Khan; The Lady Lancaster of Kimbolton; Emily Lawson; Diane Lees; The Baroness Limb; Joanna Lumley; Julie Lydon; Sally Mapstone; Ruth May; Maria Miller; Fiona Powrie; June Raine; Vanessa Redgrave; Louise Richardson; The Lady Sainsbury of Turville; Joanna Smith; Sarah Springman; Mary Stacey; Helen Stokes-Lampard; Amanda Tipples; Heather Williams
- 2023: Angela Ahrendts; Jackie Baillie; Karen Bradley; Dawn Childs; Lyn Chitty; Shirley Conran; Diane Coyle; Nicola Dandridge; Julia Dias; Sally Dicketts; Jackie Doyle-Price; Anita Frew; Henrietta Hill; Andrea Jenkyns; Annette King; Susan Langley; Denise Lewis;Averil Mansfield; Julie Maxton; Kathryn McDowell; Heather McGregor; Virginia McKenna; Amanda Milling; Eleanor Milner-Gulland; Sarah Morgan; Elizabeth Nicholl; Cathy Nutbrown; Priti Patel; Norma Redfearn; Alison Rose-Slade; Robina Shah; Ann Sindall; Neslyn Watson-Druée; Melanie Welham; Shelley Williams-Walker
- 2024: Maggie Aderin-Pocock; Harriett Baldwin; Amanda Blanc; Sonia Boyce; Karen Buck; The Baroness Coffey; Jilly Cooper; Tracey Crouch; Felicity Dahl; Jennifer Dixon; Tracey Emin; The Lady Hague of Richmond; Rebecca Harris; Tristia Harrison; Anya Hindmarch; Julia Hoggett; Karen Holford; Dianne Jeffrey; Valerie Lund; Clare Marchant; Siobhain McDonagh; Ruth Miskin; Dervilla Mitchell; Marit Mohn; Judith Petts; Hannah Rothschild; Jasvinder Sanghera; Janice Sigsworth; Imelda Staunton; Helen Stephenson; Molly Stevens; Cristina Taylor; Evelyn Taylor; Emma Thomas; Judith Weir; Moira Whyte; The Baroness Wolf of Dulwich
- 2025: The Lady Alberti; Clare Barclay; Pat Barker; Julia Black; Emma Bridgewater; Julia Buckingham; Debbie Crosbie; Jane Cummings; Alison Etheridge; The Lady Evans of Temple Guiting; Alison Fuller; Marie Gabriel; Anne Glover; Sonia Harris, Ruth Heggs; Ruth Henke, Patricia Hewitt; Anne Hudson; Celia Ingham Clark; Nicole Jacobs; Ursula Martin; Penny Mordaunt; Carmen Munroe; Chi Onwurah; Elaine Paige; Lesley Anne Powell; Barbara Rae; Lisbet Rausing; Emily Thornberry; Ijeoma Uchegbu; Theresa Villiers
- 2026: Sarah Anderson; Polina Bayvel; Sheila Bird; Malorie Blackman; Sonia Blandford; Carol Brayne; Wendy Carlin; Carol Colburn Grigor; Lorna Dawson; Anneliese Dodds; Julia Donaldson; Jane Fraser; Helen Gordon; Sarah Lucina Hackman; Melanie Hall; Carol Homden; Serena Kennedy; Iammogapi Launa; Shelagh Legrave; Beverly Lindsay; Suzannah Lishman; Jessica Morden; Crystal Oldman; Amanda Pritchard; Fiona Rayment; Hayaatun Sillem; Heather Stevens; Meera Syal; Anna Taylor; Jayne Torvill; Sue Tranka; Meena Upadhyaya

== See also ==
- List of dames grand cross of the Order of the British Empire
- List of knights grand cross of the Order of the British Empire
