= Anne Marie Rafferty =

British nurse (born 1958)

The Right Honourable The Baroness Rafferty DBE FRCN
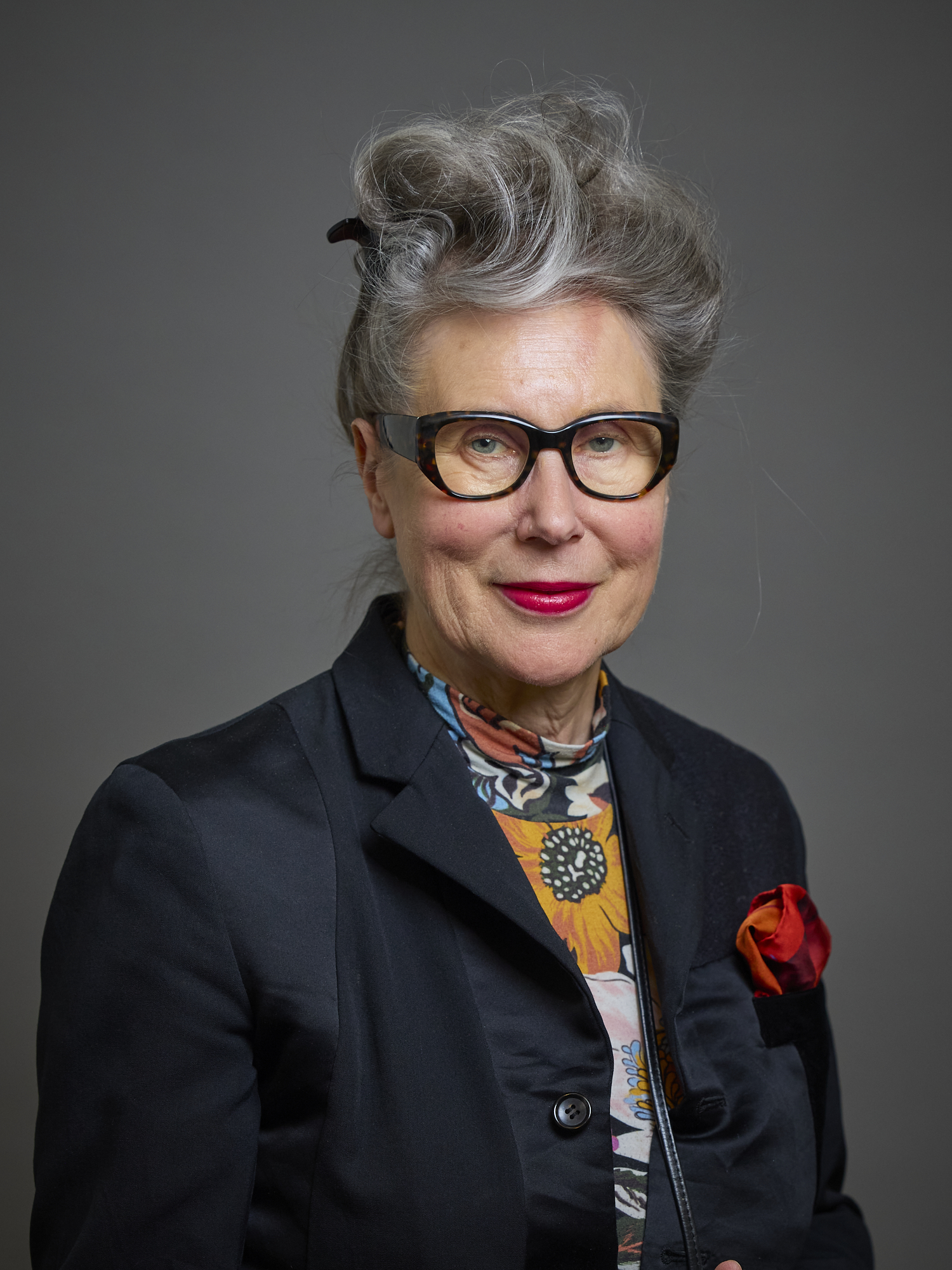
- Official portrait, 2025
- Born: 7 May 1958 (age 68); Kirkcaldy, Fife, Scotland
- Citizenship: British
- Occupation: Professor of Nursing Policy
- Known for: Research on nursing and healthcare policy

Academic background
- Education: University of Edinburgh; University of Nottingham; University of Oxford
- Thesis: The politics of nurse education, 1860-1948 (1992)

Academic work
- Discipline: Nursing
- Institutions: King's College London

Member of the House of Lords
- Lord Temporal
- Life peerage 10 February 2025

Personal details
- Party: Labour

Anne Marie Rafferty, Baroness Rafferty DBE FRCN (born 7 May 1958) is a British nurse, academic and researcher. She is the professor of nursing policy and the former dean of the Florence Nightingale Faculty of Nursing, Midwifery and Palliative Care at King's College London. She served as President of the Royal College of Nursing from 2019 to 2021.

She is a fellow of the Royal College of Nursing, the American Academy of Nursing, and the Academy of Medical Sciences. In 2008, she was seconded to the Department of Health to work with Lord Ara Darzi on the Next Stage Review of the NHS and was subsequently appointed Commander of the Order of the British Empire (CBE) for services to healthcare. She was a member of the Prime Minister's Commission on the Future of Nursing and Midwifery between 2009 and 2010, Front Line Care (Report published 2010). and a member of the Parliamentary Review of Health and Social Care in Wales which reported in 2018. She is a current member of the NHS Assembly. In 2020, she was appointed Dame Commander of the Order of the British Empire (DBE) for services to nursing.

== Early life and education ==
Rafferty was born and raised in Kirkcaldy, Fife, Scotland. Her father was a coal miner and her mother a nurse. Rafferty says that it was hearing her mother's stories of nursing prisoners of war during the Second World War that inspired her to become a nurse. Rafferty attended St Marie's Primary School and St Andrew's High School, both in Kirkcaldy, Fife. She graduated from the University of Edinburgh in 1982 with a BSc in nursing studies. From 1982 to 1986 she worked as a staff nurse and research assistant at the Queen's medical centre, Nottingham while studying for her MPhil in Surgery at the University of Nottingham.

Rafferty studied for her DPhil (Modern History) at the Wellcome Unit for the History of Medicine at the University of Oxford and was a student of Green College (now Green Templeton College). During her studies, Rafferty worked part-time as a nurse teacher and lecturer at the John Radcliffe Hospital and Open University.

In 1989, she was awarded her DPhil and is widely cited as the first nurse to be awarded a DPhil from the University of Oxford. In 1994, Rafferty was awarded a Harkness Fellowship to study nursing policy at the University of Pennsylvania, where she worked with Linda Aiken on the role of nursing in the Clinton Administration health care reform agenda.

== Career ==
Rafferty is an historian, healthcare workforce and policy researcher. Her research into the healthcare workforce was the first to establish the link between nurse staffing and patient mortality rates in the UK. She designed the Culture of Care Barometer which has been adopted by the hospital outcomes research network in Europe.

Rafferty has worked clinically as a nurse at the Royal Infirmary of Edinburgh, the Queen's Medical Centre, Nottingham, and the John Radcliffe Hospital, Oxford. In 1991, she took up the position of lecturer and admissions tutor at the then newly established Department of Nursing and Midwifery studies at the University of Nottingham. For the academic year 1994-1995 she was a Harkness Fellow at the University of Pennsylvania and subsequently took up the post of senior lecturer at the London School of Hygiene and Tropical Medicine where she established the Centre for Policy in Nursing Research. Rafferty was promoted to Reader and became head of the Health Services Research Unit at the London School of Hygiene and Tropical Medicine in 2001. She subsequently moved to King's College London in 2004 to become Professor of Nursing Policy and Dean of the Florence Nightingale Faculty of Nursing and Midwifery. She stood down as Dean in September 2011 to become Director of Academic Outreach. Rafferty has subsequently been co-director of the Wellcome Centre for Humanities and Health and is currently co-director of the Health and Social Care Workforce Policy Research Unit at King's College London.

In 2008, Rafferty was seconded to the Department of Health to advise on nursing policy for the then Minister of Health Lord Ara Darzi and the Chief Nursing Officer Professor Dame Christine Beasley during the Next Stage Review of the NHS. In 2009, she served on the Prime Minister's Commission on the Future of Nursing and Midwifery. Rafferty co-led the Student Commission on the Future of the NHS which was supported by NHS England, and was a member of the Parliamentary Review of Health and Social Care in Wales which reported in 2018. She is a member of the NHS Assembly.

Rafferty served as a member of the nursing and midwifery panel in the UK's Research Assessment Exercise 2008, and as a member of the allied health professions, nursing, dentistry and pharmacy sub-panel for Research Excellence Framework 2014 and 2021.

Rafferty holds honorary appointments at the University of Pennsylvania and Poly University, Hong Kong. She is visiting professor at the National Institute for Health and Care Research (NIHR) funded Patient Safety Translational Research Centre at the Imperial Healthcare NHS Trust. Rafferty holds honorary doctorates from the University of Dundee and University of East Anglia.

In 2018, it was announced that Rafferty would become the next President of the Royal College of Nursing (RCN), a position she held from January 2019 to July 2021. Previously she had acted as the RCN representative on the Health Quality Improvement Partnership and was also a member of the RCN's Safe Staffing Expert Reference Group. Rafferty is the founding director and President of the European Nursing Research Foundation.

== Honours and awards ==
Rafferty was appointed Commander of the Order of the British Empire (CBE) in the 2009 New Year Honours for services to healthcare and Dame Commander of the Order of the British Empire (DBE) in the 2020 Birthday Honours for services to nursing. Rafferty holds fellowships from Royal College of Nursing (2002), the Queens Nursing Institute (2005) and the American Academy of Nursing (2011). She was elected a Fellow of the Academy of Medical Science in 2019 and a Member of the Academia Europaea in 2020. She is also a Fellow of King's College London where she has been the professor of nursing policy since 2004.

Rafferty has been the recipient of various awards including the Nursing Times Leadership Award in 2014 and Health Services Journal Top 100 Clinical Leaders Award in 2015. She was inducted onto the Sigma Theta Tau International Hall of Fame in 2016 and in 2017 Rafferty was nominated as one of the 70 most influential nurses in the first 70 years of the National Health Service.

Rafferty was nominated by Keir Starmer for a life peerage on 20 December 2024 as part of the 2024 Political Peerages. She was created Baroness Rafferty, of Kirkcaldy in the County of Fife on 10 February 2025.
