= Marjorie Cox =

Marjorie Cox may refer to:

- Marjorie Cox Crawford, Australian tennis player
- Dame Marjorie Sophie Cox, British public servant (created a Dame Commander of the Order of the British Empire in 1950)
