= Elizabeth Coker =

Elizabeth Coker may refer to:

- Libby Coker, Australian politician
- Dame Elizabeth Coker, British businessperson, see the list of dames commander of the Order of the British Empire
