= Rethinking Health =

British health education campaign

- Formation: 2024
- Type: Health education campaign
- Parent organisation: NHS Charities Together (host)
- Website: rethinkinghealth.uk

Rethinking Health (also known as Rethinking Health: Hope for the Future) is a British campaign, led by healthcare students and trainees, that calls for health professional education to place greater emphasis on prevention and health creation. Founded in 2024, it is hosted by NHS Charities Together, which provides administrative and income-generation support.

== History ==
Rethinking Health was founded in 2024 by a group of healthcare students and early-career health professionals. It launched its report, Hope for the Future, at the House of Lords in November 2024, at an event attended by Nigel Crisp, Donna Kinnair, David Haslam and Sam Everington, among others. In December 2024 members of the campaign set out its case for reforming medical education in an opinion article in The BMJ. On 25 March 2025, at a Council of Deans of Health parliamentary reception, Crisp cited the role that the council's members could play in the campaign's work on disease prevention and health creation.

On 11 February 2026 the campaign held a round table at the House of Lords, chaired by Crisp, that brought together NHS leaders, people in training, academics and policy makers. NHS Charities Together said that insights from the discussion would be used to shape a policy white paper.

== Activities ==
The campaign runs a national Champion scheme, in which healthcare students and early-career professionals give talks or workshops on campus and work with local societies, GP educators or community health projects. The scheme has been promoted by the Workforce, Training and Education directorate of NHS England and by professional bodies, including the British and Irish Orthoptic Society. The campaign combines this activity by people in training with guidance from senior health leaders and engagement with policy makers. In June 2026 it published a Charter for Champions and Advocates, which sets out six principles under three aims.

== People ==
A Strategic Advisory Board guides the campaign. Its co-chairs are Nigel Crisp, a former chief executive of the NHS in England, and Donna Kinnair, a former chief executive and general secretary of the Royal College of Nursing. Other members include David Haslam, Robina Shah, Keith Willett, Norman Lamb, Katie Petty-Saphon and Kamran Abbasi, together with Alf Collins.

== Publications ==
Members of the campaign published an opinion article, "Medical education fit for the future requires radical change", in The BMJ in 2024. A conference abstract, "Rethinking health: mobilising the future health workforce from sick-care to systems change", appeared in Evidence-Based Medicine in 2025. In a 2025 article in The BMJ, Nigel Crisp described the campaign, which he called Hope for the Future, as "a group of young health professionals" who were "already working to build a positive future". A 2026 article by Crisp in the Oxford Medical School Gazette included a section describing the campaign's aims.
