= Maria McIlgorm =

OBE Maria McIlgorm

Chief Nursing Officer for Northern Ireland
- Incumbent
- Assumed office March 2022
- Preceded by: Linda Kelly (interim)

Personal details
- Born: Belfast, Northern Ireland
- Children: 2
- Education: University of the West of England

Maria McIlgorm OBE is a Northern Irish nurse midwife and healthcare administrator who has served as the Chief Nursing Officer (CNO) for Northern Ireland since March 2022. She previously worked for nearly 30 years in the National Health Service (NHS) in England and Scotland, holding senior roles including chief midwife/nurse for NHS Lothian and professional adviser within the Scottish Government. As CNO, McIlgorm launched a five-year strategic vision for the profession and has overseen initiatives to increase student training places and reform the use of agency nurses. In October 2023, she was also appointed an honorary professor of practice at Queen's University Belfast.

== Early life and education ==
McIlgorm was born in Belfast, Northern Ireland. She began her nursing training in the Republic of Ireland, working at Our Lady of Lourdes Hospital, Drogheda. She joined the nursing register in 1988 before moving to London to train as a midwife, a qualification she gained in 1990. In 1994, she earned an undergraduate degree in midwifery from the University of the West of England. McIlgorm completed a leadership programme with Harvard Business School. In 2011, received a postgraduate diploma in Leadership Practice from Edinburgh Napier University. She also completed a Coaching and Leading for Improvement programme through NHS Scotland.

== Career ==
=== Early career in England and Scotland ===
McIlgorm worked in a range of acute and community health and social care settings in both England and Scotland. After training, she worked in several different roles in London before moving to NHS Scotland. In 2003, she was appointed Chief Midwife/Nurse for Women's Services for NHS Lothian. Her role there was expanded in 2012 to include the Directorate of Neurology and Neurosciences. By January 2022, McIlgorm had worked in the National Health Service (NHS) for nearly 30 years.

In 2015, McIlgorm became the chief nurse for the Edinburgh Health and Social Care Partnership. She later served as a professional adviser within the Chief Nursing Officer Directorate at the Scottish Government, at which she contributed to policy development.

=== Chief Nursing Officer for Northern Ireland ===
On 19 January 2022, Northern Ireland's Health Minister Robin Swann announced McIlgorm's appointment as the new Chief Nursing Officer (CNO). She officially began her term in March 2022, succeeding professor Charlotte McArdle and taking over from outgoing interim CNO Linda Kelly. McIlgorm's tenure began as the health service was emerging from the COVID-19 pandemic in Northern Ireland and facing budgetary and political challenges.

In May 2023, she launched her strategic blueprint, Shaping our Future: A Vision for Nursing and Midwifery in Northern Ireland: 2023–2028, at a conference in Belfast. The vision's strategy was drawn from the Nursing and Midwifery Task Group (NMTG) report and identifies four key priorities: workforce and workload planning; education and training; improving career pathways; and creating a quality assurance framework.

During her tenure, McIlgorm has overseen several initiatives. Under a 2020 agreement, the health department delivered 900 extra undergraduate nursing and midwifery student places over a three-year period. She also established a new framework for the supply of agency nurses and midwives to eliminate the use of "off-contract" agency workers and launched the Continuity of Midwifery Carer framework to provide integrated care during pregnancy and birth.

In October 2023, McIlgorm was appointed honorary professor of practice in the School of Nursing and Midwifery at Queen's University Belfast. She delivered her inaugural professorial lecture at the university on 24 September 2024, in which she discussed the role of Northern Ireland's 29,000 nurses and midwives in addressing health and social care challenges. She was made an Officer of the Order of the British Empire during the 2026 New Year Honours.

== Personal life ==
McIlgorm has two children.
