= Ruth May =

Ruth May may refer to:

- Ruth May (nurse), Chief Nursing Officer for England from 2019
- Ruth May Fox (1853–1958), English-born women's rights activist in the Territory of Utah
