= John Appleby (economist) =

British economist

John Appleby, FAcSS is a British economist. He was chief economist at the King's Fund from 1998 to 2016 and is now Director of Research and Chief Economist at the Nuffield Trust.

Appleby has worked in the National Health Service in Birmingham and London, and was a senior lecturer at the University of Birmingham and University of East Anglia. He is a visiting professor at the City Health Economics Centre, City University London. For five years he worked for the National Association of Health Authorities (now the NHS Confederation) as manager of the Association's Central Policy Unit. He writes extensively about current health policy matters, including the economic issues associated with the government's reform agenda for health care such as the expansion of competitive forces in the NHS, patient choice, secondary care payment system, the use of patient reported outcome measures and the measurement of productivity in health care.

He has acted as an advisor to the UK government and Parliament in various capacities, for example, carrying out a review for Ministers of the future funding needs of Northern Ireland's health service, and as a task force member for the Marmot Commission on health inequalities; a special adviser to the House of Commons Health Select Committee, member of the National Quality Board's Priorities sub-committee and as a member of the Department of Health's Stakeholder Reference Group on patient reported outcome measures. He was also an expert advisor on the Prime Minister's independent commission into nursing and midwifery that published the Front Line Care (Report) in 2010.

In 2021, Appleby joined the board of the first ever NHS Race and Health Observatory which examines the health inequalities experienced by Black and minority ethnic communities in England.

== Honours ==
In 2016, Appleby was elected a Fellow of the Academy of Social Sciences (FAcSS).

== Publications ==
- Using Patient Reported Outcomes to Improve Health Care with Nancy Devlin and David Parkin, John Wiley & Sons, 2016. ISBN 9781118948606.
- The NHS productivity challenge Experience from the front line with Amy Galea, Richard Murray Kings Fund 2014
- How is the health and social care system performing? with Richard Humphries, James Thompson, Amy Galea Kings Fund June 2013
- The Reorganized National Health Service, with Ruth Levitt, Andrew Wall, Chapman & Hall, 1995
