= Aisha Holloway =

Scottish nurse

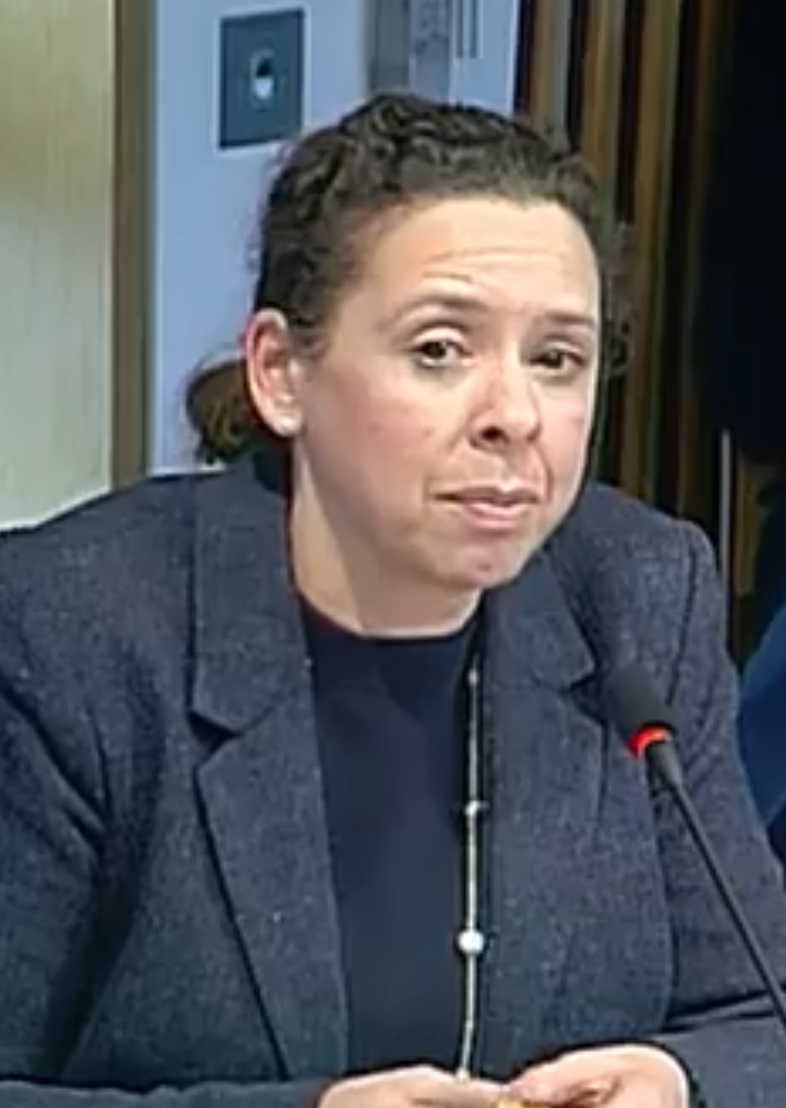
- Holloway in 2017

Chief Nursing Officer for Scotland
- Incumbent
- Assumed office November 2025
- Preceded by: Anne Armstrong (interim)

Personal details
- Education: Abertay University; Glasgow Caledonian University

Aisha Holloway is a Scottish nurse and academic who was appointed Chief Nursing Officer (CNO) for Scotland in 2025. She is also chair of nursing studies at the University of Edinburgh, with a research focus on global public health, alcohol-related harm, and political leadership in nursing. Holloway is a fellow of the Royal College of Nursing and the Royal College of Surgeons.

== Education ==
Holloway earned a BSc in nursing from Abertay University in 1992. In 2000, she completed a Ph.D. at Glasgow Caledonian University. Her dissertation was an evaluation of self-efficacy and minimal interventions for problem drinkers in a hospital setting.

== Career ==
Holloway's career is based at the University of Edinburgh, where she is as professor, chair of nursing studies, and head of nursing studies. She is an adjunct professor at Johns Hopkins School of Nursing. Her research program spans over three decades, and she has held advisory roles with Public Health England and served on the board of the Royal College of Nursing Publishing (RCNi). She was a recipient of a Chief Nursing Officer (CNO) Scotland Research Fellowship.

Holloway's research on alcohol-related harm gained media attention in 2012 for highlighting the need for better nurse training, in 2015 for its use of photography to aid recovery, and in 2016 for a project helping male remand prisoners. In 2016, as a Florence Nightingale Leadership Scholar, she visited the U.S. Congress and submitted written evidence to a UK All-Party Parliamentary Group. On March 17, 2017, she provided evidence to the Scottish Health and Sport Committee.

Holloway received the Established Career Research Award in 2017 and a Cavell Star Award in 2019. In 2020, she co-founded the Edinburgh Global Nursing Initiative (EGNI). She joined the Law Society of Scotland as a lay member in May 2022. She played a key role in the Scottish Government's Nursing and Midwifery Taskforce, established in 2023.

Holloway holds the title of Fellow ad eundem of the Faculty of Nursing and Midwifery at the Royal College of Surgeons in Ireland (FNMRCSI ad eundem) and is a Fellow of the Royal College of Surgeons. On June 2, 2024, she was made a Fellow of the Royal College of Nursing. In July 2025, the Scottish Government announced her appointment as the next Chief Nursing Officer for Scotland, with Health Secretary Neil Gray offering his congratulations. She succeeded the interim CNO, Anne Armstrong, who had held the position since Alex McMahon retired. Holloway is scheduled to begin her term in November 2025.
