= Jane Salvage =

British global health leader and writer (born 1953)

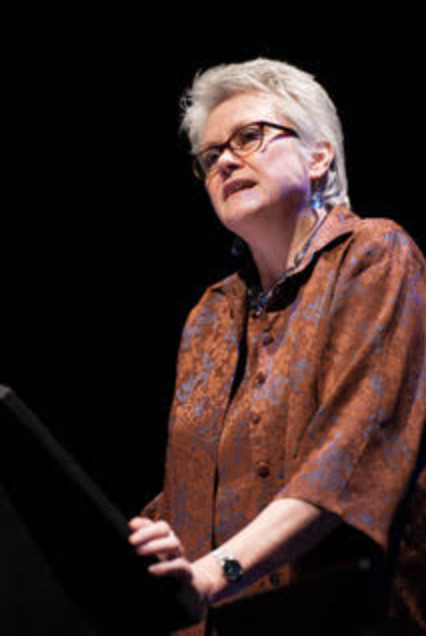
- Born: 6 August 1953 (age 73); Brighton, Sussex, United Kingdom
- Education: Newnham College, Cambridge
- Occupations: Nurse; Teacher; Writer
- Years active: 1974 – present

Jane Salvage (born 6 August 1953 in Brighton, Sussex) is a British nursing and midwifery policy activist, teacher, and writer. She has been described as "a hugely influential nurse leader who has contributed to advancing nursing in a wide number of roles throughout her career".

Her first book, The Politics of Nursing, called for widespread reform and greater recognition of the profession and of women carers. She worked as a nurse, then a nursing journalist, and established a career in global health, leading programmes in nursing and midwifery in Europe and worldwide for the World Health Organization (WHO), International Council of Nurses and others. Throughout her career, she has highlighted the politics of health, including related issues including nurses and midwives' low pay, poor treatment and working conditions, and lack of status.

Her latest book, The Midwives' Gospel: the forgotten women at the birth of Jesus (2025) blends compelling storytelling, art history and political analysis. It highlights the historical importance of midwives and current concerns about the downgrading of their role.

== Early life and education ==
Jane Salvage was born in Brighton, Sussex, England. After winning a scholarship to Brighton and Hove High School for Girls, she studied English, French, and Italian Literature at Newnham College, Cambridge, where she was President of the Junior Common Room and the first student to serve on Newnham College's governing body. She later became a Newnham Associate and then Honorary Associate.

The sudden death of her brother Guy in 1974 influenced her decision to enter nursing after graduating from Cambridge. She trained at the Princess Alexandra School of Nursing, based at the London Hospital, Whitechapel. After qualification as a registered general nurse she worked there as a staff nurse.

== Career ==
Salvage became active in the Royal College of Nursing and local politics in the East End of London in the late 1970s. In 1978 funding cuts to the National Health Service (NHS) threatened to close Bethnal Green Hospital, and she campaigned and wrote about it. She was also active in the Anti-Nazi League and Rock Against Racism.

=== Scholarship and writing ===
After her 1978 article in Nursing Mirror about cuts to the National Health Service and the poor treatment of nurses, Salvage was invited to write a monthly "Student's View" column. She later joined the staff of Nursing Mirror full time and won the Trainee of the Year award, completing the International Publishing Corporation Business Press proficiency training. In 1981 she moved to the rival weekly magazine Nursing Times as news and features editor. In 1984, she became the launch editor of Senior Nurse (1984 – 1987), then special projects editor on Nursing Standard.

While working on these magazines, Salvage published and spoke at conferences on issues related to nurses' low pay, poor working conditions, and lack of status, and also raised awareness of the broader politics of health. She was an active member of the Radical Nurses Group, which contributed to her first book, The Politics of Nursing (Heinemann 1985). She promoted feminist views of nursing and highlighted the need for intersectionality in healthcare. In 1988 Andrew Cole described her as "the radical voice of nursing".

The success of The Politics of Nursing stimulated and reflected nurses' growing recognition of the need to be more assertive. Neil Kinnock, the then leader of the Labour Party, helped launch the book, commending her for bringing the ideas of the modern women's movement to nursing.

In 1988, she obtained a MSc in sociology with special reference to medicine from Royal Holloway and Bedford New College, University of London. Her dissertation focused on the movement known as 'the New Nursing', which promoted patient-centred care and modernization of the profession.

Her next book, Nurses at Risk (Heinemann 1988), was co-authored with Rosemary Rogers and updated in 1999 with Roger Cowell. It focused on nurses' health and safety at work, and was described as 'a courageous ground-breaker' in her citation for an honorary doctorate from the University of Sheffield in 1996. In 1997, while editor-in-chief of Nursing Times, she was the British Society of Magazine Editors runner-up Editor of the Year. In 1999, she was the Periodical Publishers Association Columnist of the Year for her weekly column in Nursing Times. In 1998, she was a speaker in the 50th Anniversary Lecture Series marking the foundation of the NHS.

Between 2010 and 2012, she edited NMC Review for the UK Nursing and Midwifery Council. From 2013 to 2025, she was Writer in Residence and Visiting Professor at Kingston University and St George's, University of London.

=== Health and nursing leadership ===
From 1988 to 1991, Salvage was founding director of the Nursing Developments Programme at the King's Fund. It supported Nursing Development Units in hospitals and community services to promote research-based, patient-centred care and advocate greater nursing autonomy. She obtained government funding to encourage the foundation of more NDUs.

From 1991 to 1995, she was Regional Adviser for Nursing and Midwifery at the WHO European regional office, based in Copenhagen. She focused particularly on improving nursing and midwifery in central and eastern Europe and the new WHO member states of the former USSR. Her team also produced the first evidence-based comparative study of nursing and midwifery in Europe. In 2004, she served as interim chief scientist for nursing at WHO headquarters in Geneva. She continued to undertake consultancy work for WHO, the European Union and others, including a project to improve the quality of nursing and midwifery in post-conflict Bosnia and Herzegovina. She also worked with the British non-governmental organization Medact, co-authoring and editing three reports on the health and environmental costs of the Iraq War .

In 2009 - 2010, she worked full-time in the Department of Health, England, in the secretariat of the Prime Minister's Commission on the Future of Nursing and Midwifery. Launched by Prime Minister Gordon Brown and chaired by MP and nurse Ann Keen, its recommendations were published in Front Line Care 2010. She then worked in the secretariat of the Commission on Nursing Education, based at the Royal College of Nursing and chaired by Lord (Phil) Willis. Its 2012 report, Quality with Compassion: the future of nursing education, underlined the importance of moving to an all-graduate nursing profession.

As policy advisor to the UK All-Party Parliamentary Group on Global Health, she worked closely with its chair, Lord (Nigel) Crisp, on a review of global nursing. Its report, Triple Impact, urged policy-makers worldwide to see nursing in a different light, and offered solutions and development opportunities. Triple Impact was the springboard for the global Nursing Now campaign, which led to the declaration of 2020 as the International Year of the Nurse and Midwife. Salvage wrote and spoke about the campaign worldwide.

From 2016 to 2021 she was director of the International Council of Nurses' Global Nursing Leadership Institute, an annual programme helping senior nurse leaders from round the world to improve their strategic policy competencies. In 2021 she directed a midwifery leadership programme commissioned by the Government of India to advance its Midwifery Initiative, in partnership with the WHO Country Office for India. This led to her consultancy with WHO Headquarters to create a model midwifery leadership programme for global use.

== Awards and recognition ==
In 2008, Nursing Times named her the sixth most influential nurse of the last 60 years. In 2018, as part of the 70th anniversary of the NHS, the NHS identified her as one of the 70 most influential UK nurses and midwives of the past 70 years. In 2012, she was appointed Fellow of the Royal College of Nursing. In 2019, she was elected Fellow of the Faculty of Nursing and Midwifery of the Royal College of Surgeons in Ireland. She has honorary doctorates from the University of Sheffield (1996), Kingston University and St George's, University of London (2011), and Middlesex University (2016). She is also a fellow of the Queen's Nursing Institute (now the Queen's Institute of Community Nursing).

== Select bibliography ==
- 1985 The Politics of Nursing. London: Butterworth-Heinemann; ISBN 9780433290100
- 1986 Models for Nursing (edited Betty Kershaw & Jane Salvage). John Wiley and Sons; ISBN 9780471909910
- 1988 Nurses at Risk: A Guide to Health and Safety at Work (with Rosemary Rogers). London: Butterworth-Heinemann; ISBN 9780433000372
- 1990 Models for Nursing 2 (edited Jane Salvage & Betty Kershaw). London: Scutari Press. ISBN 9781871364262
- 1991 Nurse Practitioners: Working for Change. London: King's Fund; ISBN 9780903060967
- 1993 Nursing in Action: Strengthening Nursing and Midwifery to Support Health for All. Copenhagen: World Health Organization. ISBN 9289013125
- 1997 Nursing in Europe: A Resource for Better Health Copenhagen: World Health Organization; ISBN 9789289013383
- 1999 Nurses at Risk: A Guide to Health and Safety at Work (second edition), with Rosemary Rogers and Roger Cowell. Basingstoke: Macmillan Press; ISBN 0-333-73185-9
- 2011 Skyros: Island of Dreams. Skyros Foundation; ISBN 9780956901903
