= Front Line Care =

The Front Line Care report was a Prime Minister's independent commission on the future of nursing and midwifery in England. It was published in 2010, followed by the UK Government's response in 2011. It was the first overarching governmental review of nursing and midwifery since the Briggs Report was published in 1972.

== Context ==
In 2010 there were around 541,400 registered nurses in the UK, which made it the largest professional workforce in the UK. The report focused on the nursing and midwifery workforce; it was very wide ranging, given the breadth of care settings, specialisms, and career levels in the professions.

Prime Minister Gordon Brown (Labour Government) commissioned the report in March 2009. The report was published in March 2010, not long before the May 2010 United Kingdom general election which resulted in a coalition government, led by David Cameron (Conservative) and Nick Clegg (Liberal Democrats).

The nursing and midwifery sector were heavily invested in the outcome as this was the first significant government review of the sector commissioned in 38 years. The committee included significant nursing leaders and offered twenty far-reaching recommendations. However, the 2010 general election may have explained the 'scant attention' given to it by the media.

== Content ==
This workforce report set out to:

- Identify the competencies, skills and support required by nurses and midwives, and the barriers that they faced
- Identify the potential for nurses and midwives to lead and manage their own services
- Engage with the nursing and midwifery professions, patients and the public to identify challenges and opportunities.

== Committee ==
The Chair was Ann Keen MP, Chair of the commission who trained as a nurse.

The Commissioners were Gail Adams (Unison); Christine Beasley; Sue Bernhauser (Health UK, Dean of Council of Deans); Kuldip Bharj (University of Leeds); Peter Carter (Royal College of Nursing); Dawn Chapman (Addenbrooke's Hospital); Audrey Emerton, Baroness Emerton; Professor Dame Elizabeth Fradd; Judith Griffin (NHS Blackburn); Professor Dame Donna Kinnair; Heather Lawrence (NHS Chelsea and Westminster); Joanna Pritchard (Central Surrey Health); Professor Dame Anne Marie Rafferty; Claire Rayner; Professor Laura Serrant; Janice Sigsworth (NHS Imperial College); Eileen Sills; Tamar Thompson (Independent); Ray Walker (NHS 5 Boroughs); and Cathy Warwick (Royal College of Midwives).

The Support Office joint leads were Ursula Gallagher and Jane Salvage.

The expert advisors were Linda Aiken; John Appleby; Professor James Buchan Queen Margaret University; Kathy George (Nursing and Midwifery Council); Fiona Ross; and Professor Dickon Weir-Hughes (Nursing and Midwifery Council).

== Recommendations ==
The report made twenty high-level recommendations re workforce on seven key themes: high quality, compassionate care; health and wellbeing; caring for people with long-term conditions; promoting innovation in nursing and midwifery; nurses and midwives leading services; careers in nursing and midwifery; the socioeconomic value of nursing and midwifery.

The recommendations were headed:

1. A pledge to deliver high quality care
2. Senior nurses’ and midwives’ responsibility for care
3. Corporate responsibility for care
4. Strengthening the role of the ward sister
5. Evaluating nursing and midwifery
6. Protecting the title ‘nurse
7. Regulating nursing and midwifery support workers
8. Regulating advanced nursing and midwifery practice
9. Building capacity for nursing and midwifery innovation
10. Nursing people with long-term conditions
11. Nurses’ and midwives’ contribution to health and wellbeing
12. A named midwife for every woman
13. Staff health and wellbeing
14. Flexible roles and career structures
15. Measuring progress and outcomes
16. Educating to care
17. Marketing nursing and midwifery
18. Fast-track leadership development
19. Integrating practice, education and research
20. Making best use of technology.

== Government response and impact ==
The Government's response to the report was led by Anne Milton, at that point the Conservative Parliamentary Under Secretary of State for Public Health, and published in April 2011. Rather than introducing any new commitments, the response primarily signposted existing activities such as International Nurses' Day or existing structures such as the Care Quality Commission or the Nursing Midwifery Council.

Without government commitment, progress on recommendations was slow and inconsistent. For example, recommendation number six, to protect the 'nurse' title was only brought forward as a bill to Parliament in 2025 - fifteen years after the report was published. Or where the regulation of support workers recommendation was partially met by the creation of the Council for Healthcare Regulatory Excellence (CHRE) (which became the Professional Standards Authority for Health and Social Care (PSA)).

Similarly the new government's vision for nurses' wellbeing was indicated in the response as being set out in Healthy Lives, Healthy People: our strategy for public health in England, which would be implemented through the 2011 Health and Social Care Bill. The recommendation on wellbeing was rolled into the NHS Health and Wellbeing Review by Dr Steven Boorman which was to be locally implemented, and the expectation that employers would implement policies supporting zero tolerance of direct threats to the physical safety of staff.

One significant response was to recommendation eleven, committing to a Director of Nursing in the Department of Health, ensuring that the nursing perspective would be incorporated into public health policy.

Despite the nursing and midwifery sector's view that the report was critical to their professions and to patient care, little attention was given to it by the media. The media focused on the government's response to recommendation sixteen, reiterating a commitment that that pre-registration nursing programmes would convert to an all graduate profession on qualification by 2013.

The lack of response to the report is primarily explained by the change of government, and that the incoming coalition government focused on the introduction of their Health and Social Care Act 2012. Known as the Lansely Reforms (for the Conservative MP Andrew Lansley who led the work) it was the most extensive reorganisation of the structure of the National Health Service in England to date. This did little to meet the needs of the nursing and midwifery sector as set out in the Front Line Care report, and was not well received in the nursing sector. On 13 April 2011, 96 per cent of 497 delegates at the Royal College of Nursing conference backed a motion of no confidence questioning Andrew Lansley's handling of NHS reforms in England.

As at 2023, the report remained the most recent government workforce strategy for nursing and midwifery published by the Government, despite there being an ongoing global and national vacancy crisis in the sector.
