= Chief Nursing Officer (United Kingdom) =

Most senior government adviser on nursing matters

The Chief Nursing Officer (CNO) is the most senior adviser on nursing matters in a government. The CNOs in the United Kingdom are appointed to advise their respective governments: His Majesty's Government, the Northern Ireland Executive, the Scottish Government and the Welsh Government. Each CNO is assisted by one or more Deputy Chief Nursing Officers, and is complemented by a Chief Medical Officer.

== Chief Nursing Officers for England ==
The Chief Nursing Officer is based at the Department of Health and Social Care (and its predecessors).

- 1941–1948: Dame Katherine Watt
- 1948–1958: Dame Elizabeth Cockayne
- 1958–1972: Dame Kathleen Raven
- 1972–1982: Dame Phyllis Friend
- 1982–1992: Dame Anne Poole
- 1992–1999: Dame Yvonne Moores
- 1999–2004: Dame Sarah Mullally
- 2004–2012: Dame Christine Beasley
- 2012–2019: Dame Jane Cummings
- 2019–2024: Dame Ruth May
- 2024–present: Duncan Burton

== Chief Nursing Officers for Scotland ==
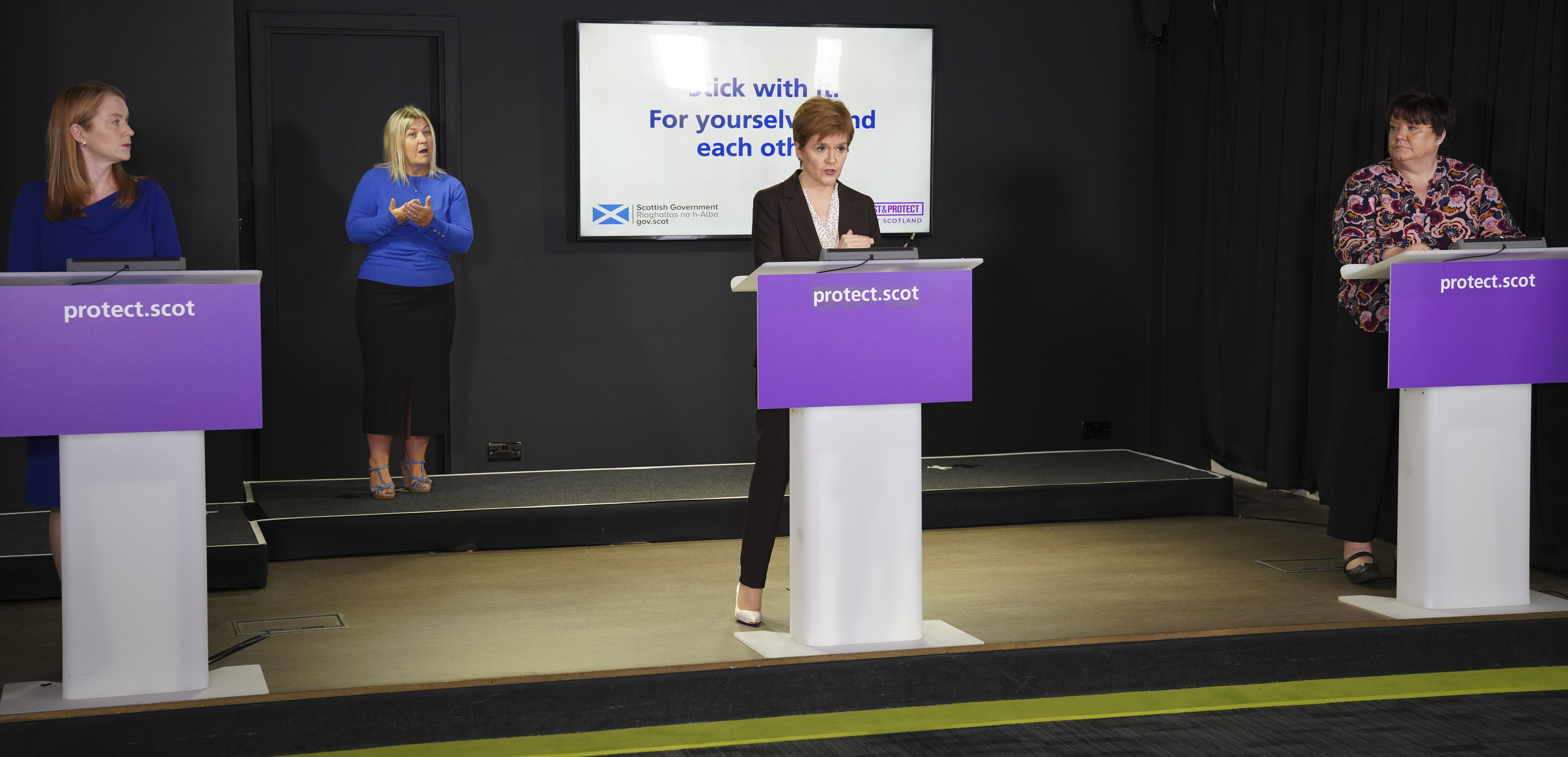
Shirley-Anne Somerville, Nicola Sturgeon and Fiona McQueen briefing Scotland during the COVID-19 pandemic in September 2020

The Chief Nursing Officers for Scotland is based at the Scottish Government and previously at the Scottish Office.

- 1939–1944: Margaret Colville Marshall
- 1944–1961: Mary Olivia Robinson
- 1961–1969: Margaret Macnaughton
- 1970–1976: Dame Muriel Powell
- 1977–1988: Margaret Gibson Auld
- 1988–1992: Dame Yvonne Moores
- 1992–2004: Anne Jarvie
- 2004–2009: Paul Martin
- 2010–2014: Rosalyn Elaine Moore
- 2015–2020: Fiona McQueen
- 2020–2021: Prof Amanda Croft
- 2022–2024: Prof Alex McMahon
- 2024–2025: Anne Armstrong (interim)
- 2025–present: Prof Aisha Holloway

== Chief Nursing Officers for Wales ==
- 1972–1981: Edith Alice Bell
- 1982–1988: Dame Yvonne Moores
- 1999–2010: Rosemary Kennedy
- 2010–2021: Jean White
- 2021–2021: Gareth Howells (interim)
- 2021–present: Sue Tranka

== Chief Nursing Officers for Northern Ireland ==
The Chief Nursing Officer for Northern Ireland is based at the Department of Health (and its predecessors).

- 1960–1975: Mona Grey
- 1995–2005: Judith Hill
- 2005–2011: Martin Bradley
- 2013–2021: Charlotte McArdle
- 2022–present: Maria McIlgorm

== See also ==
- Chief Dental Officers (United Kingdom)
- Chief Medical Officers (United Kingdom)
