= Jane Cummings =

Chief Nursing Officer for England

Dame Jane Frances Cummings DBE is a former Chief Nursing Officer for England, formerly at the Department of Health and subsequently at NHS England.

In November 2013 she was interviewed about the demand for safe staffing levels in NHS hospitals and told ITV Daybreak: "The most important thing to do is to use evidence to determine what the staffing levels should be. "It's actually quite dangerous to to [sic] suggest that there must be a particular minimum and what we really need to do is to look at the needs of the patients on a particular ward or service and that will vary."

In 2012, Cummings developed and published the 6C's of Nursing – a set of core values and expectations of registered nurses in the UK.

In December 2013 she was involved in the launch of the £100 million Nursing Technology Fund and said "Technology is a tool that, if embraced and used in the right way, allows healthcare professionals to work differently and more effectively so they can focus on what they do best – providing compassionate, high quality care for patients."

She was said by the Health Service Journal to be the 36th most powerful person in the English NHS in December 2013. As of 2015, Cummings was paid a salary of between £165,000 and £169,999 by NHS England, making her one of the 328 most highly paid people in the British public sector at that time.

She was appointed a Commander of the Order of the British Empire (CBE) in the 2019 New Year Honours for services to Nursing and the NHS. She was made a Dame Commander of the Order of the British Empire (DBE) in the 2025 Birthday Honours list when she was Chair of RCN Foundation.

She was succeeded as Chief Nursing Officer for England by Ruth May, in January 2019.

Preceded by Christine Beasley	Chief Nursing Officer for England -2019	Succeeded by Ruth May
