= Duncan Burton =

British nurse administrator

Chief Nursing Officer for England
- Incumbent
- Assumed office 25 July 2024
- Preceded by: Dame Ruth May

Personal details
- Profession: Nurse

Duncan Burton is a British nurse. Since 2024 he has served as Chief Nursing Officer for England in NHS England.

== Education ==
Burton has a bachelor's degree in Nursing and master's degree in Healthcare Practice.

== Career ==
Barton has been an NHS nurse for all of his career. From 2014 to 2017, as Executive Director of Nursing and Patient Experience at the Kingston Hospital NHS Foundation Trust, he oversaw the Trust's dementia strategy. As Deputy Chief Nursing Officer for England, he led England's maternity and neonatal programme, nursing workforce policy and infection prevention and control. In this role, he implemented a Nursing International Recruitment Programme and Health Care Support Worker Recruitment Programme.

Preceded by Ruth May	Chief Nursing Officer for England; 2024 – present	Succeeded by Incumbent
