= Margaret Auld =

Scottish nurse, Matron and Chief Nursing Officer for Scotland (1977–1988)

Margaret Auld FRCN
- 1978
- Born: 11 July 1932; Cardiff, Wales
- Died: 10 September 2010 (aged 78); Edinburgh, Scotland
- Occupations: Nursing Sister; Matron; Chief Nursing Officer for Scotland
- Known for: The Aberdeen Formula
- Medical career
- Profession: nursing
- Institutions: Queen's Park Hospital, Blackburn; Cardiff Maternity Hospital; Queen Mary Hospital, Dunedin; Simpson Memorial Maternity Pavilion; Scottish Home and Health Department

Margaret Gibson Auld FRCN (11 July 1932 – 10 September 2010) was a Scottish nurse, Matron at Simpson Memorial Maternity Pavilion, Edinburgh and Chief Nursing Officer for Scotland from 1977 to 1988.

== Early life and education ==
Auld was born in Cardiff on 11 July 1932 to Scottish parents, Eleanor Margaret Ingram and Alexander John Sutton Auld. She attended Cardiff High School for Girls and Glasgow High School, going on to train as a nurse at Radcliffe Infirmary, Oxford, qualifying as a state registered nurse in 1953. She further qualified as a midwife in 1954. In 1962 she qualified with a teaching diploma in midwifery and received her Certificate in Nursing Administration from the University of Edinburgh in 1966. In 1974 she received her MPhil from the university.

== Career ==
In her early career, Auld worked at Queen's Park Hospital (1953–54), Blackburn, as a staff midwife at Cardiff Maternity Hospital in 1955 and as Sister in 1957. She then travelled to New Zealand to work as a Sister at Queen Mary Hospital, Dunedin (1959–1960). She returned once again to Cardiff Maternity Hospital where she was Departmental Sister from 1960 to 1966. She then transferred to Scotland where she would remain for the rest of her life. She was Assistant Matron at Simpson Memorial Maternity Pavilion in Edinburgh from 1966 to 1968, and Matron from 1968 to 1973. In 1973 she became Chief Area Nursing Officer for Borders Health Board.

She was appointed Chief Nursing Officer for Scotland in 1977, holding the position until 1988. As CNO she was key to the development of the Aberdeen formula, a method for calculating the number and quality of nurses required for hospital service. She supported the training and education of nurses in Scotland and made the case for them to take up senior positions in medical services. She was proud of the fact that, at that time, Scotland produced 50 percent of nurse graduates in the UK.

In her professional capacity she sat on many boards and committees including as; a member of the Briggs Committee on Nursing (1972–1976), member of the Human Fertilization and Embryology Authority (1990–93), a member of the Committee on Ethics of Gene Therapy (1990–1993), and governor of the Board of Governors of Queen Margaret College (1989–2000), and as Chairperson from 1997 to 2000.

== Recognition ==
The Margaret Auld Prize at the University of Glasgow was created in 1993 in recognition of her contribution to nursing and midwifery education in Scotland. It is awarded each graduating year for the best dissertation in the university's BSc(Hons) Nursing.

In 1987 she received the first Honorary Degree, a DSc, to be awarded by Queen Margaret College, Edinburgh.

She was made a Fellow of the Royal College of Nursing in 1981.

== Personal life ==
Auld met her lifelong companion Kay Rowe in Edinburgh in the 1960s. After her retirement Auld travelled extensively with Rowe.

She was fond of animals and kept dogs.

Auld died in Edinburgh on 10 September 2010. Rowe predeceased her by a few months.
