= Sarah Cowley (nurse) =

British health visitor and academic

Professor Dame Sarah Cowley is a British health visitor and academic, specialising in the field of child and family public health.

== Biography ==
Cowley started a career in Eastbourne as a health visitor and practice teacher. After completing doctoral studies, she joined the faculty of King's College London leading the University's programme in health visiting and district nursing programme. She was appointed Professor of Community Practice Development in 1997, and retired in 2012.

During her career she served on a number of editorial boards, and was the author of paper and books including Community Public Health in Policy and Practice (Elsevier, 2008) and, with Marion Frost, The Principles of Health Visiting: Opening the door to public health (2006).

== Career ==
Professor Cowley has served as:

- Adjunct Professor, University of Technology Sydney
- Visiting Professor University of São Paulo
- Member of the National Institute for Health Research
- Past Chair of the Community Practitioners and Health Visitors Association (CPHVA)
- Fellow and former vice-chair of the Queen's Nursing Institute
- Professorial Fellow of the Royal Society of Public Health
- Fellow of the Irish Institute of Community Health Nursing.

== Honours ==
In 2012, she was awarded a lifetime achievement award by the CPHVA. She was raised to Dame Commander of the British Empire (DBE) for services to health visiting in the 2013 New Year Honours.
