= Anne Poole =

Dame Anne Poole DBE
- Born: Avril Anne Barker; 11 April 1934 (age 91)
- Occupation: Chief Nursing Officer (CNO)

Dame Avril Anne Barker Poole DBE (born 11 April 1934), known as Anne Poole, is a former British civil servant who was Chief Nursing Officer for England at the Department of Health, from 1982 to 1992.

On 27 January 1997 she was named to serve on the Criminal Injuries Compensation Appeal Panel.
