= Judith Hill (nurse) =

Dame Judith Hill DBE

Chief Nursing Officer for Northern Ireland
- In office 1995 – March 2005
- Succeeded by: Martin Bradley

Personal details
- Born: January 1948 (age 78)

Dame Judith Hill DBE (born January 1948) is an English nurse who served as the Chief Nursing Officer (CNO) for Northern Ireland from 1995 to 2005 and later as the chief executive of the Northern Ireland Hospice. During her tenure as CNO, she oversaw the introduction of nurse prescribing and the integration of nursing education into the university system. She was appointed a Commander of the Order of the British Empire (CBE) in 2001 and a Dame Commander of the Order of the British Empire (DBE) in 2012 for her contributions to nursing and palliative care.

== Career ==
=== Early career ===
Hill began her nursing career at St Thomas' Hospital in London before moving into nurse education. She specialised in palliative care, holding the role of senior nurse and tutor at Countess Mountbatten House in Southampton, and was assisted in the establishing the group that would become the Royal College of Nursing's (RCN) palliative care forum. She served as a nurse director in both the Wessex and the South West Regional Health Authorities in England.

=== Chief Nursing Officer for Northern Ireland ===
In 1995, during the first ceasefire of The Troubles, Hill was appointed Chief Nursing Officer for Northern Ireland, a post she would hold for nearly ten years. She took on the role amidst a challenging political landscape, navigating periods of direct rule and local governance. In a 1999 interview, Hill outlined her strategic vision for the profession, called Valuing Diversity, which focused on developing practice, education, research, and leadership. As part of this work, she identified challenges, noting in the same interview that Northern Ireland's cancer services had "some very poor results in relation to the rest of UK and Europe" that required remedial work. She also initiated north–south cooperation with her counterpart in the Republic of Ireland, meeting quarterly to work on shared issues such as public health and education.

Hill was responsible for the framework that integrated nursing and midwifery education into higher education in 1997 and chaired the Northern Ireland review of palliative care services, which published the report "Partnerships in Caring" in 2000. She oversaw the successful introduction of nurse prescribing in the province.

For her services to nursing, Hill was appointed a Commander of the Order of the British Empire (CBE) in the 2001 New Year Honours. That same year, her office was criticised by Pauline Hunter, the RCN's head of education in Northern Ireland, for allegedly not commissioning enough nurse practitioner posts to support key projects. A spokesperson for Hill's department responded by stating they fully supported the role of nurse practitioners and noted there were 30 such posts across the province.

At a 2003 conference, Hill spoke about the need for policy to address specific social determinants such as "mental health needs, poverty and the legacy of the Troubles". In a 2003 editorial, Hill identified four areas for nursing management, policy development, workforce development, service development, and practice development. During her CNO tenure, she also contended with an increase in demand for nurses, which led to the recruitment of nearly 1,000 nurses from the Philippines and India. This influx was met with some racist attacks, prompting the health department to launch an anti-racism strategy to support the overseas staff.

After nearly ten years as CNO, Hill stepped down from the post in March 2005.

=== Northern Ireland hospice ===
Immediately following her departure as CNO in 2005, Hill became the chief executive of the Northern Ireland Hospice, a voluntary organisation providing care for adults and children. In June 2008, she was presented with the RCN Northern Ireland Outstanding Achievement Award. The following year, in May 2009, she was made a Fellow of the Royal College of Nursing in acknowledgment of her work in overseeing nurse prescribing and other contributions to healthcare.

In 2010, Hill was part of a consortium including the Ulster University that secured funding to establish the All Ireland Institute for Hospice and Palliative Care (AIIHPC). She served as the chair of the AIIHPC's Management Committee and its Policy and Practice Committee. In July 2011, the university awarded her an honorary Doctor of Science (DSc) degree for her services to nursing and palliative care. She was also a visiting professor at the university's School of Nursing.

In the 2012 New Year Honours, Hill was appointed a Dame Commander of the Order of the British Empire (DBE) for her services to palliative care. In 2013, as a panellist at an RCN congress fringe meeting, she discussed personal health budgets, expressing the view that the direct payment system was "just bureaucracy".
