= Linda Aiken =

American nurse and scholar (born 1943)

Linda Aiken Ph.D., FAAN, FRCN, RN
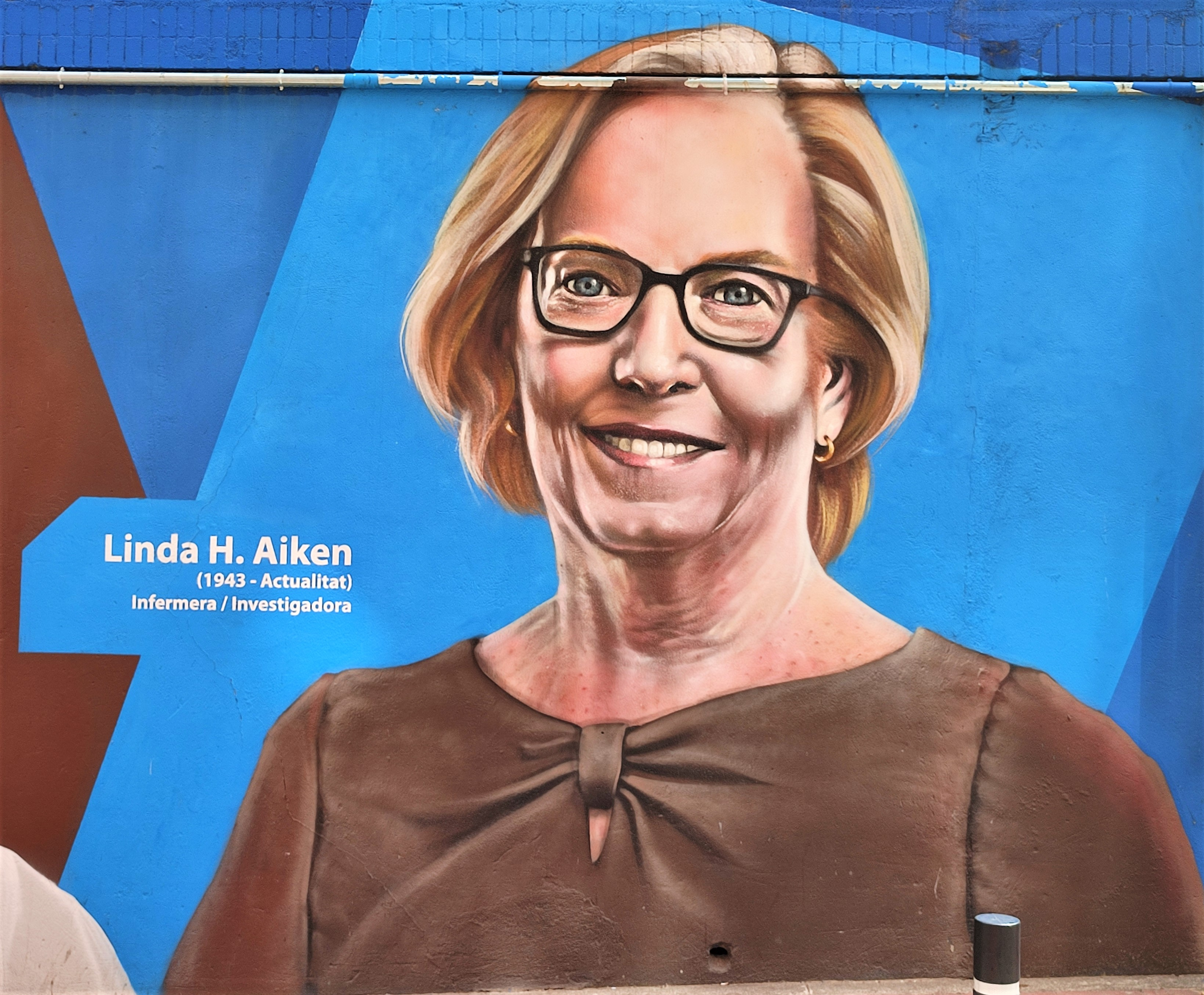
- Portrait of Aiken on the external wall of the Vall d'Hebron University Hospital in Barcelona, Spain
- Born: July 29, 1943 (age 83)
- Education: University of Florida; University of Texas at Austin
- Occupations: Nurse; professor at University of Pennsylvania

Linda H. Aiken (born July 29, 1943) is an American nurse and researcher who is currently the Founding Director for the Center for Health Outcomes and Policy Research and a Senior Fellow of the Leonard Davis Institute of Health Economics. She also is the Claire M. Fagin Leadership Professor of Nursing Science and a professor of Sociology at the University of Pennsylvania, Philadelphia.

== Early life and education ==
=== Early life ===
Aiken grew up in Gainesville, Florida, a college town which her family life was centered around the activities at the University of Florida. Both of her parents attended the College of William & Mary. Her role mentor was Dorothy Smith, Dean of the University of Florida's School of Nursing.

=== Education ===
Aiken received her Bachelor of Science in Nursing cum laude at the University of Florida in 1964. She went on to earn a Master of Science in Nursing in thoracic surgery in 1966.

She initially intended to be a clinician and worked at Shands Teaching Hospital for a few years before deciding to return to school. Aiken had met many influential sociologists throughout her undergraduate education and first few years working as a clinician.

She decided to return to school and received a Ph.D. in Sociology at the University of Texas at Austin specializing in Demography in 1973. She went on to the University of Wisconsin–Madison and completed a post-doctoral fellowship in Medical Sociology in 1974.

== Career ==
Following completion of her post-doc in 1974, Aiken began work as a program officer for The Robert Wood Johnson Foundation. She served in various roles while there including Director of Research, Assistant Vice President, and Vice president.

In 1988, she joined the faculty at the University of Pennsylvania. She has continued on the faculty at University of Pennsylvania and serves as the Clare M. Fagin Leadership Professor of Nursing, a professor of sociology, and the Director for the Center for Health Outcomes and Policy Research. In addition, she is a Research Associate and on the executive committee at the Population Studies Center at Penn as well as a Senior Fellow at the Leonard Davis Institute of Health Economics. She has been a visiting professor at Katholieke Universiteit Leuven in Belgium since and has been an adjunct professor in the School of Nursing at Queensland University of Technology since 2011.

== Research ==
Linda Aiken has worked in the health research field for most of her career. She is an authority for causes and consequences of nurse shortages in the U.S. and globally.

Her research focuses on reducing health outcomes disparities across various patient populations. She has directed large scale studies on the impact of nursing on health outcomes of patients, including aging patients, minority patients, chronically ill patients, patients undergoing various surgical procedures, those with AIDS, and other factors.

Her research focuses on the determinants of variation in health services(i.e. hospitals, rehabilitation centers, etc.) on patient outcomes, the impact of culture and organizational work environments of healthcare organizations on patient, workforce, and cost outcomes, comparative international health outcomes research, and outcome evaluations of healthcare policies and programs.

She is co-director of the RN4CAST, a study of the nursing workforce and quality of hospital care for fourteen countries: Europe, China, South Africa, and Botswana.

She is an advisory for the China Medical Board, creating a network with China's eight leading nursing schools for conducting a policy relevant research. She is also the founder and leader for the International Hospital Outcomes Consortium, which has conducted national studies in sixteen countries and worldwide, and also serves as an advisor for the Dubai Health Care City developing of its flagship university hospital and directing a national study of hospital care in the United Arab Emirates.

She was an expert adviser on the Prime Minister of the United Kingdom's independent commission into nursing and midwifery that published the Front Line Care (Report) in 2010.

To improve health in the countries of the former Soviet Union, Aiken collaborated with American International Health Alliance. She was a former leader for the international dissemination of the Magnet Recognition Program which includes the establishment of the four nursing programs of excellence for the hospitals in Russia and Armenia.

== Awards and honors ==
In 2005, Aiken received the AcademyHealth Distinguished Investigator Award in Health Services Research for her research that demonstrated the link between the patient safety and the adequacy of nursing. In 2006, she was chosen as the inaugural recipient for the Baxter International Foundation's William B. Graham Prize for Health Services Research, and also in 2003, she received the Individual Earnest A. Codman Award from the Joint Commission on Accreditation of Healthcare Organizations (JCAHO) for her leadership performing and demonstrating relationships of nursing care and patient outcomes. She was elected a fellow of the American Academy of Arts and Sciences in 1998 and she was named the American Academy of Political and Social Science's 2003 Theodore Roosevelt Fellow. Aiken is also a fellow and past president of the American Academy of Nursing. Furthermore, Aiken is the recipient of six honorary doctorates.

== Notable works ==
- McHugh, M., Kelly, L., Sloane, D., Aiken, L. Contradicting Fears, California's Nurse-To-Patient Mandate Did Not Reduce the Skill Level of the Nursing Workforce in Hospitals. Health Affairs, Jul 2011, 30(7): 1299–1306.
- Aiken, L.H. Nurses for the Future. NEJM, Jan 20 2011, 364(3): 196–198.
- Naylor, M., Aiken, L., Kurtzman, E., Olds, D., Hirschman, K. The Care Span: The Importance of Transitional Care in Achieving Health Reform. Health Affairs, Apr 2011, 30(4): 746–754.
- Vahey, D.C., Aiken, L.H., Sloane, D.M., Clarke, S.P., Vargas, D. Nurse Burnout and Patient Satisfaction. Medical Care, 2004, 42(2): Suppl, II57-66.
- Rogers, A.E., Hwang, W.T., Scott, L.D., Aiken, L.H., Dinges, D.F. The Working Hours of Hospital Staff Nurses and Patient Safety. Health Affairs, 2004, 23(4): 202–12.
- Aiken, L.H. Achieving an Interdisciplinary Workforce in Health Care. NEJM, 2003, 348(2): 164–6.
- Aiken, L., Clarke, S., Cheung, R., Sloane, D., Silber, J. Educational Levels of Hospital Nurses and Surgical Patient Mortality. JAMA, 2003, 290(12): 1617–23.
- Clarke, S.P., Aiken, L.H. Failure to Rescue. American J of Nursing, 2003, 103(1): 42–7.
- Aiken, L., Clarke, S., Sloane, D., Sochalski, J., Silber, J. Hospital Nurse Staffing and Patient Mortality. Nurse Burnout and Job Dissatisfaction. JAMA, 2002, 288(16): 1987–93.
- Cooper, R.A., Aiken, L.H. Human Inputs: The Health Care Workforce and Medical Markets. JHPPL, 2001, 26(5): 925–38.
- Aiken, L., Clarke, S., Sloane, D., Sochalski, J., Busse, R., Clarke, H., Giovannetti, P., Hunt, J., Rafferty, A., Shamian, J. Nurses' Reports on Hospital Care in Five Countries. Health Affairs, 2001, 20(3): 43–53.
- Aiken, Linda (1988). "Linda Aiken". In Schorr, Thelma M.; Zimmerman, Anne (eds.). Making Choices, Taking Chances: Nurse Leaders Tell Their Stories. St. Louis, Missouri: The C. V. Mosby Company. ISBN 0801646111.
