= Caroline Watkins =

English academic

Dame Caroline Watkins DBE
- Education: The Merchant Taylors’ School; University of Liverpool, BA (Hons); University of Liverpool, PhD
- Awards: Special Recognition Life After Stroke Award, Stroke Association, September 2016
- Scientific career
- Fields: Stroke recovery
- Workplaces: University of Central Lancashire; National Institute for Health Research
- Thesis: The Effects of Patient's Expectations on the Rehabilitation Process (1990-1999)
- Website: uclan.ac.uk/staff_profiles/professor_caroline_watkins.php

Dame Caroline Leigh Watkins DBE, is an English academic, the Professor of Stroke and Older People's Care - and Director of Research and Innovation - of the College of Health and Wellbeing, University of Central Lancashire. She is the only nursing stroke care professor in the United Kingdom.

== Career ==
Watkins was educated at the Merchant Taylors’ School (MTGS) in Crosby, Liverpool. She achieved her PhD at the University of Liverpool for her thesis titled The Effects of Patient's Expectations on the Rehabilitation Process, 1990-1999.

Watkins leads the Clinical Practice Research Unit (CPRU) for stroke research, is Director of Lancashire Clinical Trials Unit (Lancashire CTU) and an Honorary Stroke Nurse Consultant at Lancashire Teaching Hospitals NHS Foundation Trust (LTHTR). She is also the Director of Capacity Building and Implementation for National Institute for Health Research Collaboration for Leadership in Applied Health Research and Care North West Coast (NIHR CLAHRC NWC) and lead UK arm of the "HeadPost" international study into acute stroke care. She was formerly the chair of UK Stroke Forum (UKSF).

Watkin's work is internationally recognised, has been used to guide researchers and clinicians globally, and has informed UK health policy and national stroke guidelines.

== Awards ==
Watkins was awarded the honour of Dame (DBE) in the 2017 New Year Honours, for services to Nursing and Older People's Care. She was also recognised with a Special Recognition Life After Stroke Award by UK's The Stroke Association in 2016.

Watkins is a member of the World Stroke Organisation and is a Fellow of the European Stroke Organisation (ESO), an honour which is usually only given to doctors.
