= Charlotte McArdle =

Irish nurse

Charlotte McArdle is the Chief Nursing Officer for Northern Ireland. She began her nursing training at Beaumont Hospital in Dublin in 1988, qualifying in 1991. Her career has seen her work in both the Republic of Ireland and Northern Ireland. She was appointed as Chief Nursing Officer by the Department of Health in 2013, and served in that role during the COVID-19 pandemic.

== Life ==
Charlotte McArdle is the Chief Nursing Officer for Northern Ireland. She began her nursing training at Beaumont Hospital in Dublin in 1988, qualifying in 1991. She completed a Bachelor of Science in health studies in 1996, and earned an MSc in nursing at Queen’s University, Belfast in 1999. Her career has seen her work in both the Republic of Ireland and Northern Ireland, having worked in Beaumont Hospital, Musgrave Park Hospital and Royal Group of Hospitals. At the Royal Group of Hospitals she was Ward Sister, and was awarded the 1999 Nursing Times/Foundation of Nursing Studies Leadership Award. She rose to be Deputy Director of Nursing there in 2004. In 2007 she moved to the South Eastern Trust, where she became Director of Primary Care, Older People and Executive Director of Nursing. McArdle was appointed as Chief Nursing Officer by the Department of Health in 2013, and served in that role during the COVID-19 pandemic.

McArdle is an alumna of the Florence Nightingale Executive Leadership Programme and the International Council of Nurses’ Global Nurse Leaders Programme.

She was awarded an honorary doctorate by Ulster University, and is a Fellow of the Queen's Nursing Institute and of the Faculty of Nursing and Midwifery at the Royal College of Surgeons in Ireland. She is vice chair of the RCN Foundation and a Sigma nursing liaison officer to the United Nations.
