= Yvonne Moores =

British nurse (born 1941)

Dame Yvonne Moores DBE FRSH
- Born: 14 June 1941 (age 85)
- Occupations: Consultant to the United Nations and World Health Organization

Dame Yvonne Moores, DBE, FRSH, CIMgt (born 14 June 1941) is a retired British nurse. She is a former Chief Nursing Officer for Wales, for Scotland and for England, the only person as of 2006 to have served as chief nurse in three UK countries. As a Director of the NHS, she played a key role as advisor to the Prime Minister and Secretary of State for Health on a range of issues related to policy and improving the quality of clinical services. Moores served as consultant to the United Nations and the World Health Organization. She has been a Pro-Chancellor at Bournemouth University and Council Chair of Southampton University. In 1999, she was named Dame Commander of the Order of the British Empire. She has been awarded nursing organisation Sigma Theta Tau's International Lifetime Achievement Award, and an honorary degree from the University of Southampton.

== Life ==
Yvonne Moores was born on 14 June 1941. She qualified as a nurse and midwife in Southampton, and worked initially in London and Winchester as a ward sister. Having moved into leadership roles in London and Manchester, she was appointed Chief Nursing Officer for Wales, a position she filled for six years. She was then appointed Chief Nursing Officer for Scotland, and then for England. She is the only person (as of 2006) to have served as Chief Nursing Officer in three UK countries. As a Director of the NHS, she played a key role as advisor to the Prime Minister and Secretary of State for Health on a range of issues related to policy and improving the quality of clinical services. Moores retired in 2006.

Moores serves as consultant to the United Nations and the World Health Organization. She has been a Pro-Chancellor at Bournemouth University and Council Chair of Southampton University (2000–06).

In 1999, she was named Dame Commander of the Order of the British Empire. She was awarded an honorary degree at the University of Southampton in 2006 in recognition of her contribution to nursing. In 2017 she received nursing organisation Sigma Theta Tau's International Lifetime Achievement Award in recognition of her "extraordinary contribution to the health and wellbeing of world citizens".
