= Lucile Sayers =

American-British political activist

Dame Lucile Newell Sayers DBE JP (née Schiff; 27 February 1887 – 4 November 1959) was an American-British political activist.

Sayers was born in Cincinnati, Ohio, the daughter of Charles Schiff, a banker from Trieste, Austria, and Mary Ballard Burch of Chattanooga, Tennessee. The family moved to London when she was a young child. In 1910, she married Maj. Lorne Sayers.

From 1946 to 1949, Sayers was chairwoman of the Conservative Women's Advisory Committee. She was chairwoman of the National Union of Conservative and Unionist Associations in 1951–52 and president of organisation in 1955–56. From 1955 to 1957, she was the United Kingdom delegate to the United Nations' Status of Women Commission and in 1955 was the UK delegate to the General Assembly of the United Nations.

She was appointed Commander of the Order of the British Empire (CBE) in the 1952 New Year Honours and advanced to Dame Commander of the Order (DBE) in the 1956 New Year Honours for political and public services.

She collapsed and died in London on 4 November 1959, aged 73, from undisclosed causes.
