= Elizabeth Cockayne =

British nursing administrator (1894–1988)

Dame Elizabeth Cockayne DBE
- Title: Chief Nursing Officer
- Awards: Florence Nightingale Medal

Dame Elizabeth Cockayne, DBE (29 October 1894 – 4 July 1988) was Chief Nursing Officer from the inception of the National Health Service in 1948 until her retirement a decade later in 1958. She was succeeded by Dame Kathleen Raven.

== Career ==
Born in Burton-on-Trent, Cockayne decided to become a nurse due to her own experiences with ill health, such as smallpox and scarlatina. She was trained in Plymouth and Sheffield. In 1954 she chaired the World Health Organization's Expert Committee on Nursing.

== Awards/honours ==
She was awarded the Florence Nightingale Medal by the International Council of Nurses. In 1955 she was appointed a Dame Commander of the Order of the British Empire (DBE).

== Death ==
Dame Elizabeth Cockayne died at Rushett Cottage, Littleheath Lane, Cobham, Surrey on 4 July 1988, aged 93.
