= Valerie Lund =

British rhinologist (born 1953)

Dame Valerie Lund DBE MS FRCS
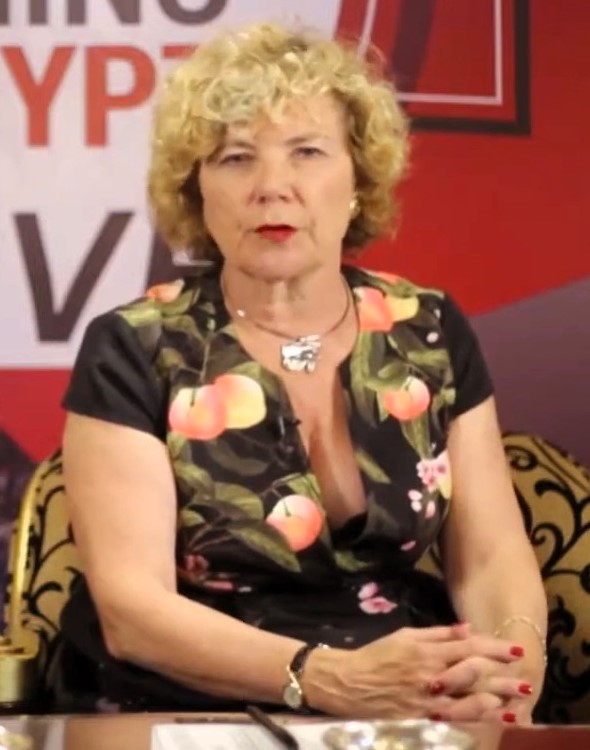
- Lund in 2024
- Born: 9 May 1953 (age 73)
- Education: University of London
- Scientific career
- Workplaces: University College London
- Thesis: Inferior meatal antrostomy : fundamental considerations of design and function (1987)

Dame Valerie Joan Lund (born 9 May 1953) is a British surgeon who is Emeritus Professor in Rhinology at University College London. Lund has worked on endoscopic endonasal surgery and studies sinonasal conditions She was elevated from CBE to DBE in the 2024 New Year Honours.

== Early life and education ==
Lund studied medicine at Charing Cross Hospital Medical School, part of University of London. She completed her master's degree in surgery in 1987 and became a Fellow of the Royal College of Surgeons of England (FRCS) in 1982 and an FRCS ad eundem of the Royal College of Surgeons of Edinburgh in 1993.

== Research and career ==
Lund was appointed an honorary consultant ENT surgeon at the Royal National Throat, Nose and Ear Hospital in 1987 which she holds to the present time, now Royal Ear, Nose, Throat and Eastman Dental Hospital, University College London Hospitals Trust. She became a senior lecturer, University College London in 1987, reader in 1993 and was professor of rhinology from 1995 to 2017 when she became Emeritus Professor. She was also honorary ENT surgeon for Moorfields Eye Hospital from 1990 to 2017. Lund specialises in all nose and sinus conditions. She has extensively developed endoscopic sinus surgery and its extended applications, particularly in the skull base and orbit. She has worked particularly in the management of nose and sinus tumours, chronic rhinosinusitis and hereditary haemorrhagic telangiectasia. She has worked to improve patient outcomes, through landmark clinical studies such as the National Comparative Audit of Surgery for Chronic Rhinosinusitis and consensus documents covering rhinitis, rhinosinusitis and sinonasal tumours. She developed the Lund-Mackay score that can be used to assess extent of rhinosinusitis on endoscopy, imaging and surgery which is used internationally. She has been a co-chair of the European Position Paper on Rhinosinusitis and Nasal Polyps (EPOS2005-2020), Editor of 'Rhinology' (1999–2014) and general secretary of European Rhinologic Society (2008–2016).

She was an elected member of the Royal College of England council from 1994 to 2006, during which she chaired the Education board (1999–2004) and the Woman in Surgical Training Committee (1997–1999, 2004–2005). In 2008, artist Jane Brettle photographed Lund as part of a series of professional women which is displayed at the Royal College of Surgeons of England. Alongside her clinical duties, Lund served as president of the British Rhinological Society from 2006 to 2009, president of Royal Society Section of Laryngology and Rhinology from 2009 to 2010 and president of ENT UK from 2012 to 2015.

== Awards and honours ==
- 1993 FRCS ad eundem of the Royal College of Surgeons of Edinburgh
- 2008 Commander of the Order of the British Empire
- 2009 German Academy of Science Leopoldina
- 2016 Honorary DM University of Brighton and University of Sussex
- 2017 Honorary Fellow of the American College of Surgeons
- 2017 Honorary Member, International Rhinologic Society
- 2018 Master of the British Academic Conference in Otorhinolaryngology
- 2018 Honorary Member of the European Rhinologic Society
- 2019 Honorary Member, ENT-UK
- 2019 Lifetime Achievement Award, British Rhinologic Society
- 2019 Lifetime Achievement Award, American Rhinologic Society, International Rhinologic Society, International Society of Allergy and Inflammation of the Nose
- 2024 Dame Commander of the Order of the British Empire

== Select publications ==
- Wytske J Fokkens; Valerie J Lund; Joachim Mullol; et al. (2012). "EPOS 2012: European position paper on rhinosinusitis and nasal polyps 2012. A summary for otorhinolaryngologists". Rhinology. 50 (1): 1–12. doi:10.4193/rhino50e2. PMID 22469599. Wikidata Q83792713.
- V. J. Lund; D. W. Kennedy (1997). "Staging for rhinosinusitis". Otolaryngology–Head and Neck Surgery. 117 (3 Pt 2): S35-40. doi:10.1016/s0194-5998(97)70005-6. PMID 9334786. Wikidata Q41614415.
- Lund VJ; Kennedy DW (1995). "Quantification for staging sinusitis. The Staging and Therapy Group". The Annals of otology, rhinology & laryngology. Supplement. 167: 17–21. PMID 7574265. Wikidata Q71777919.
