= Cathy Warwick (midwife) =

Scottish midwife, trade union leader and abortion rights activist

Dame Catherine Lilian "Cathy" Warwick DBE is a Scottish midwife, trade union leader, and abortion rights activist. She was the Chief Executive of the Royal College of Midwives from 2008 to 2017. She is also Chair of Trustees of BPAS, one of the UK's leading providers of abortion services.

She received a nursing degree from the University of Edinburgh in 1975, and completed a one-year midwifery course at Queen Charlotte's Hospital in 1976. She is an Honorary Professor of Midwifery at King's College London School of Midwifery. She was appointed a CBE for services to healthcare in the 2006 Birthday Honours and elevated to DBE in the 2018 New Year Honours.

She sat on the Prime Minister's independent commission into nursing and midwifery that published the Front Line Care (Report) in 2010.

She was ranked sixth in the Health Service Journal's list of Clinical Leaders in 2015. In October 2014, she led the first ever strike by midwives in the United Kingdom.

Warwick is also a feminist who has espoused the belief that women should be able to make their own choices regardless of what those choices may be.
