= Phyllis Friend =

British nurse and nursing officer

- Born: 28 September 1922
- Died: 24 June 2013 (aged 90); Princess Alexandra Hospital Harlow
- Occupation: nurse
- Employer: Royal London Hospital Department of Health and Social Security
- Organization: Royal College of Nursing
- Known for: Chief Nursing Officer (United Kingdom) 1972–1982
- Awards: FRCN
- Honours: DBE, CBE

Dame Phyllis Muriel Friend, DBE FRCN (28 September 1922 – 24 June 2013) was a British nurse and the Chief Nursing Officer (United Kingdom) 1972–1982.

== Education and early career ==
Friend attended the Herts and Essex School in Bishop’s Stortford. Her parents both worked there - her mother was the Matron and her Father the Master. Friend originally thought that she would like to study history and become a researcher.

Friend spent much of her professional career at The London Hospital. There she received her basic nursing education between 1940 and 1943, registering as a nurse with the General Nursing Council in 1943, and undertook Part I Midwifery Training. She held the posts of ward sister, nurse tutor (1948) and assistant matron at 'The London' (1954) before becoming deputy matron at St. George's Hospital, London in 1956.

In 1959, she returned to The London Hospital as Matron Designate. In 1961, she became matron. In 1964, The London was the first to install its own computer system; a development in which Friend was heavily involved. In 1969, she was appointed Chief Nursing Officer at the Department of Health and Social Security in London in 1969, a post she held until she retired in 1982. Friend was President of the Association of Matrons from 1969 to 1972.

== Honours/awards ==
For her services to nursing she was created a Commander of the Order of the British Empire in 1972 and a Dame Commander of the Order of the British Empire in 1980. She was made a Fellow of the Royal College of Nursing in 1980.

== Dame Phyllis Friend Award ==
The Dame Phyllis Friend Award is awarded annually in recognition of the work of nurses using information and communications technology to support care. It results from a donation by Dame Phyllis herself to the Nursing Specialist Group, part of the Health Informatics Forum of the British Computer Society.

== Death ==
Friend died on 24 June 2013 in Princess Alexandra Hospital, Harlow after a long period of ill health.
