= Sonia Blandford =

British teacher, academic and professor

Dame Sonia Blandford DBE
- Born: Feltham
- Education: Bretton Hall College of Education; University of Bristol
- Scientific career
- Workplaces: Plymouth Marjon University; University College London
- Thesis: The relationship between education theory, research and practice : A teachers perspective [sic] (1995)

Dame Sonia Blandford is a British teacher and academic who is a professor of Social Mobility at University College London. Blandford is an expert in improving the educational opportunities of children from disadvantaged backgrounds. She is the founder and CEO of the charity Achievement for All.

== Early life and education ==
Blandford grew up above a sweet shop in an estate in Feltham. Her father learned to read and write as an adult, and her mother could not read or write. At the age of nine, Blandford got her first job, rolling balls of wool, and she failed her eleven-plus examinations. She has said that she her local libraries and school teachers showed her that another life was possible. Despite constant setbacks, Blandford earned a position at Bretton Hall College of Education. She says that other children were encouraged not to play with her because of her accent.

Blandford completed master's degrees in music and education, and eventually completed an education doctorate on teaching and management at the University of Bristol.

== Research and career ==
Blandford joined Oxford Brookes University as a senior lecturer. She was eventually made dean of their education programme, before moving to the University of Warwick.

Blandford was a music teacher in the 1980s. She has argued that there is an uneven educational playing field for wealthy children compared to their less well off counterparts, particularly in literacy, writing and mathematics. She has also shown that the gap is more stark for girls than boys. She believes the answer lies in reassessing over-reliance on class structures, better understanding the learning strategies of people from disadvantaged backgrounds, increasing the number of vocational training opportunities, diversifying extracurricular activities and encouraging ambition.

In 2011, Blandford founded the charity Achievement for All, which provides educational opportunities and support for young people and children. The charity seeks to improve the academic and social outcomes of students. To encourage young people to read, she launched the 200 million minutes reading challenge.

Blandford worked as a professor of Social Mobility at Plymouth Marjon University.

Blandford was appointed a Dame Commander of the British Empire in the 2026 New Year Honours.

== Selected publications ==
- Tanya Ovenden-Hope; Sonia Blandford; Tim Cain; Bronwen Maxwell (21 September 2018). "RETAIN early career teacher retention programme: evaluating the role of research informed continuing professional development for a high quality, sustainable 21st century teaching profession". Journal of Education for Teaching. 44 (5): 590–607. doi:10.1080/02607476.2018.1516349. ISSN 0260-7476. Wikidata Q129206134.

=== Books ===
- Blandford, Sonia (2017). Born to Fail? Social Mobility: a Working Class View. London: John Catt Educational, Limited. ISBN 978-1-911382-40-9.
- Blandford, Sonia (2019). Social Mobility: Chance or Choice?. London: John Catt Educational, Limited. ISBN 978-1-912906-09-3.
