= Clarissa Reid =

British philanthropist, collector, and wartime volunteer

Dame Clarissa Reid DBE (née Blanche; 1840 – 1933) was a British philanthropist, collector, and wartime volunteer. She was appointed a Dame Commander of the Order of the British Empire in the 1918 Birthday Honours for services as President of the Workers Committee and Honorary Secretary of Anglo-South American Central Depot.

== Establishment of the Anglo-South American Central Depot ==
The Anglo-South American Central Depot was established by Reid at 2 Queen's Gate in London as a club for British volunteers from the South American continent and where help was sent from Chile. Clarissa established the club after observing that volunteers from South America were alone and feeling lost in London, needing a place of welcome where contributions could be channelled. The club received assistance from British and South American volunteers, as well as banks, commercial firms, steamship companies, and railway companies.

== Collections ==
Reid and her husband amassed a collection of Peruvian antiquities and Spanish colonial furniture during his time managing the South American interests of a British merchant and shipping firm, Duncan, Fox & Co. from 1878 to 1909 Reid later bequeathed her husband's collection of Peruvian antiquities to the British Museum. His collection of Spanish colonial furniture, composed of 36 pieces, was lent to the Victoria and Albert Museum after his death in 1909 and Clarissa bequeathed it to her friend, Lady Ramsden, upon her death in 1933.

== Connection to Braemar, Scotland ==
A regular summer visitor to the Scottish village of Braemar during the 1920s, Reid leased Braemar Castle for 5 years and, during this time, commissioned Ninian Comper to make a window at St. Margaret's Church in 1928 in memory of her husband James Guthrie Reid.
