= Sue Tranka =

Dame Sue Tranka DBE
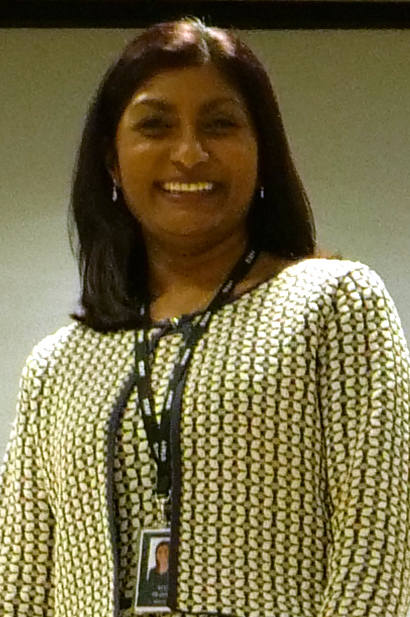
- Tranka in 2022

Chief Nursing Officer for Wales
- Incumbent
- Assumed office August 2021

Personal details
- Born: South Africa

Dame Sumeshni Tranka DBE is a South African-born nurse and healthcare administrator serving as the Chief Nursing Officer (CNO) for Wales since August 2021. She is the first person from a minority ethnic background to hold a chief nurse position in the United Kingdom. Tranka's work focuses on patient safety, quality improvement, and addressing health inequalities. She describes her leadership philosophy as leading with "head and heart," which blends data-driven analysis with compassionate, relational strategies.

== Early life and education ==
Originally from South Africa, Tranka has spoken about how growing up amid injustice and inequality motivated her to pursue a career focused on public service. She is qualified in multiple nursing specialities, including as a registered general nurse, midwife, mental health nurse, and community nurse. Tranka also studied at medical school before making a conscious decision to return to nursing. She is an alumna of the National Health Service (NHS) Leadership Academy's Stepping Up programme, which is designed for leaders from Black, Asian, and minority ethnic backgrounds. Tranka is focused on quality improvement, human factors, and safety systems.

== Career ==
As of 2024, Tranka has over three decades of nursing experience, with 26 years spent working in the NHS. She held several senior leadership positions in England, including Chief Nurse at Ashford and St Peter's Hospitals NHS Foundation Trust in Surrey. She later became the Deputy Chief Nursing Officer for Patient Safety and Innovation at NHS England and NHS Improvement, where she led the national nursing response for infection prevention and control during the COVID-19 pandemic. In October 2020, during her tenure as Deputy CNO, she was named one of the Health Service Journal's 50 most influential people in health from a Black, Asian, and minority ethnic background.

Tranka's appointment as CNO for Wales was officially announced on 29 April 2021, and she began the role in August of that year. She is the first person from a minority ethnic background to hold a chief nurse position in the United Kingdom. As CNO, Tranka serves as the primary adviser to Welsh government ministers on nursing and midwifery matters. She has focused on tackling significant challenges facing the nursing workforce, including staff shortages and the mental health impact of the COVID-19 pandemic on healthcare workers. A key initiative under her leadership was the development of a maternity and neonatal safety support programme, where she used the personal stories of women from diverse communities to highlight racial disparities in care and successfully secure funding for the project. Tranka describes her leadership philosophy as leading with "head and heart," which blends data-driven analysis with compassionate, relational strategies.

In April 2022, Tranka was appointed an honorary visiting professor at Cardiff University. Her work has also been recognized with fellowships from the Queen's Nursing Institute and the Royal College of Surgeons in Ireland (RCSI), the latter of which she received in December 2024. She was again named to the Health Service Journal's influential persons list in 2024.
