= Community Practitioners and Health Visitors Association =

British Trade Union

- Professional, Radical, Caring

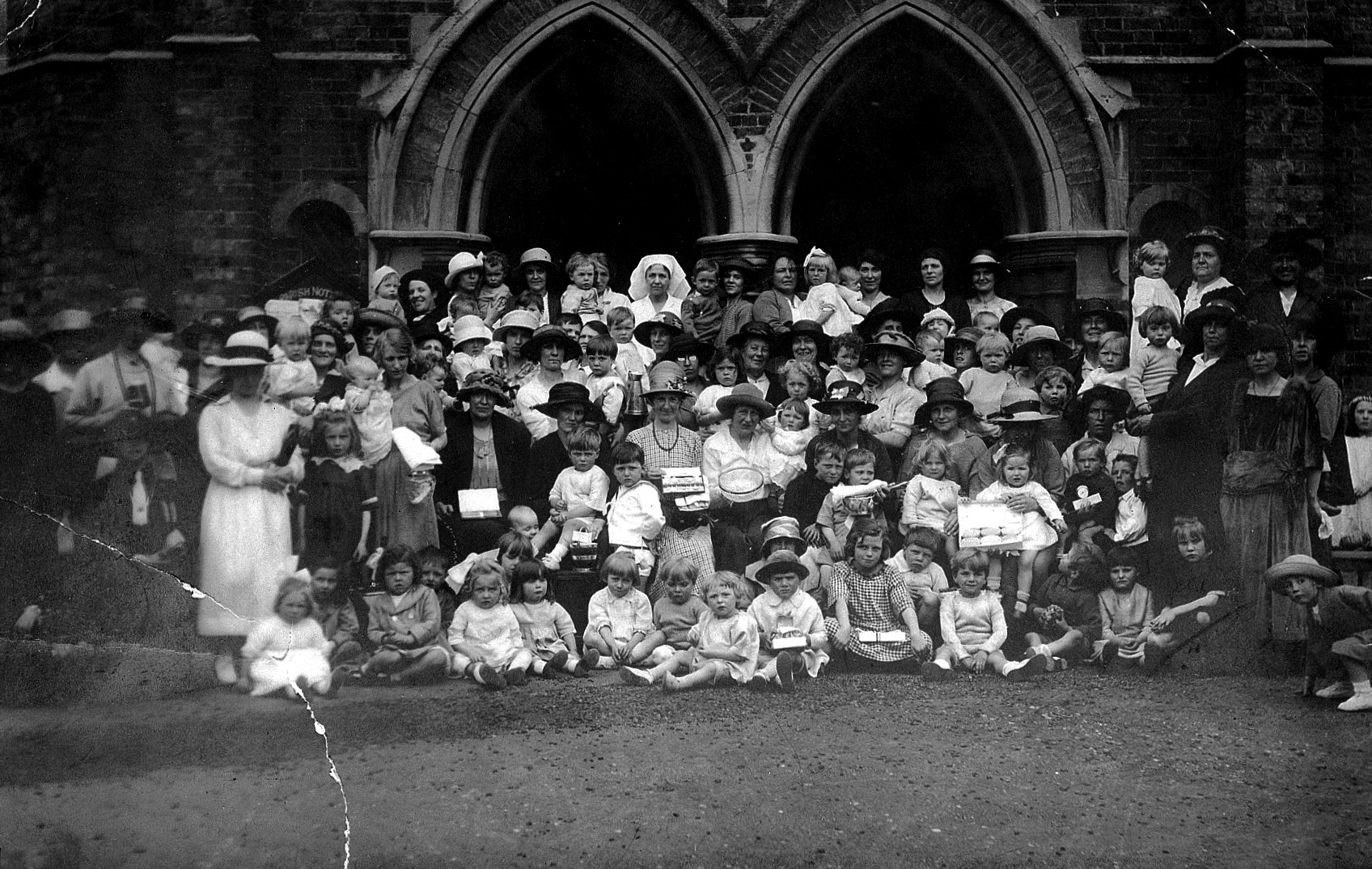
- Baby Week event in West Molesey
- Abbreviation: CPHVA
- Established: 1896; 130 years ago
- Founded at: London
- Type: Trade union
- Location: United Kingdom
- Fields: Health visitors, school nurses, nursery nurses and other community nurses
- Members: 18,500 (2015)
- Publication: Community Practitioner
- Parent organization: Unite the Union
- Formerly called: Women Sanitary Inspectors' Association, Women Sanitary Inspectors' and Health Visitors' Association, Women Public Health Officers' Association, & Health Visitors' Association

The Community Practitioners and Health Visitors Association (CPHVA) is a Trade union and professional association for health care staff in the UK and Ireland. It is part of Unite the Union.

Its 18,500 members include health visitors, school nurses, nursery nurses and other community nurses working in primary care. It produces a monthly journal Community Practitioner, which contains both news and scholarly articles.

== Activity ==
Obi Amadi, the lead professional officer, featured in a list of leading BME staff in the NHS compiled by the Health Service Journal in November 2014 and was praised for her involvement in the campaign to end female genital mutilation.

The association organises annual awards for practitioners: Community Nursery Nurse of the Year; National School Nurse of the Year; It has a fund, the MacQueen Travel Bursary for Public Health Activity Abroad to assist members to broaden their experience. Student of the Year

== History ==
- 1896 Women Sanitary Inspectors' Association founded by seven women sanitary workers, all based in London.
- 1915 renamed the Women Sanitary Inspectors' and Health Visitors' Association.
- 1917 removed the limitation of membership to qualified Sanitary Inspectors.
- 1918 Association registered as a Trade Union, affiliated to National and Local Government Officers' Association and to the National Union of Women Workers
- 1921 membership widened to include School Nurses and other kinds of public health work
- 1924 affiliated to the Trades Union Congress
- 1930 renamed Women Public Health Officers' Association
- 1962 renamed Health Visitors' Association
- 1992 amalgamated with the Manufacturing, Science and Finance Union

Health visitors were involved with Women's suffrage. The colours of the CPHVA's logo are still mauve and green.

The archives of the organisation from 1902 to 1984, when Jane Wyndham-Kaye retired as General Secretary, are held in the Wellcome Collection.

== Campaigns ==
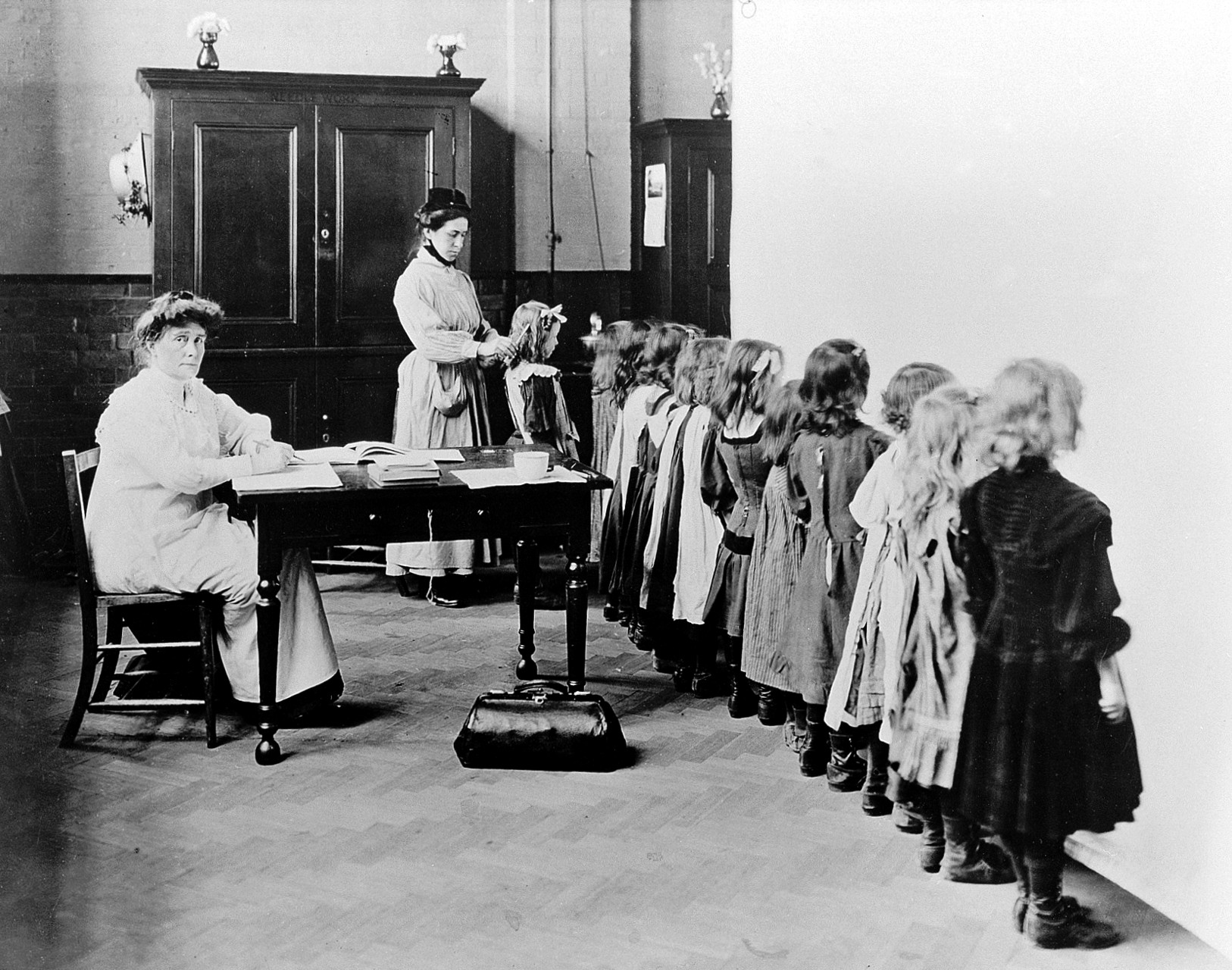
Women sanitary inspector examining young girls hair, around 1900.

It is concerned about the wider determinants of health as well as the prospects for its members.

The association is concerned about changes to the commissioning of community services for children, which will be transferred to local councils in October 2015, as commissioning of school nursing was in April 2013.

It is a member of the Paediatric Continence Forum, which presses for improvements in paediatric continence care.

In 2015 there were 12292 health visitors in England and Wales, an increase from 10,046 in 2000. In 2000 there were 297 children under 5 per health visitor, a figure which rose to 419 in 2011 but is now declining after an increase in the numbers of health visitors trained, a pledge of the coalition government. A cut of £200 million in local authority public health visitors is seen by the association as a threat to health visitor numbers.
