= Jane Jiang =

Professor Dame Jane Jiang DBE FREng FIET
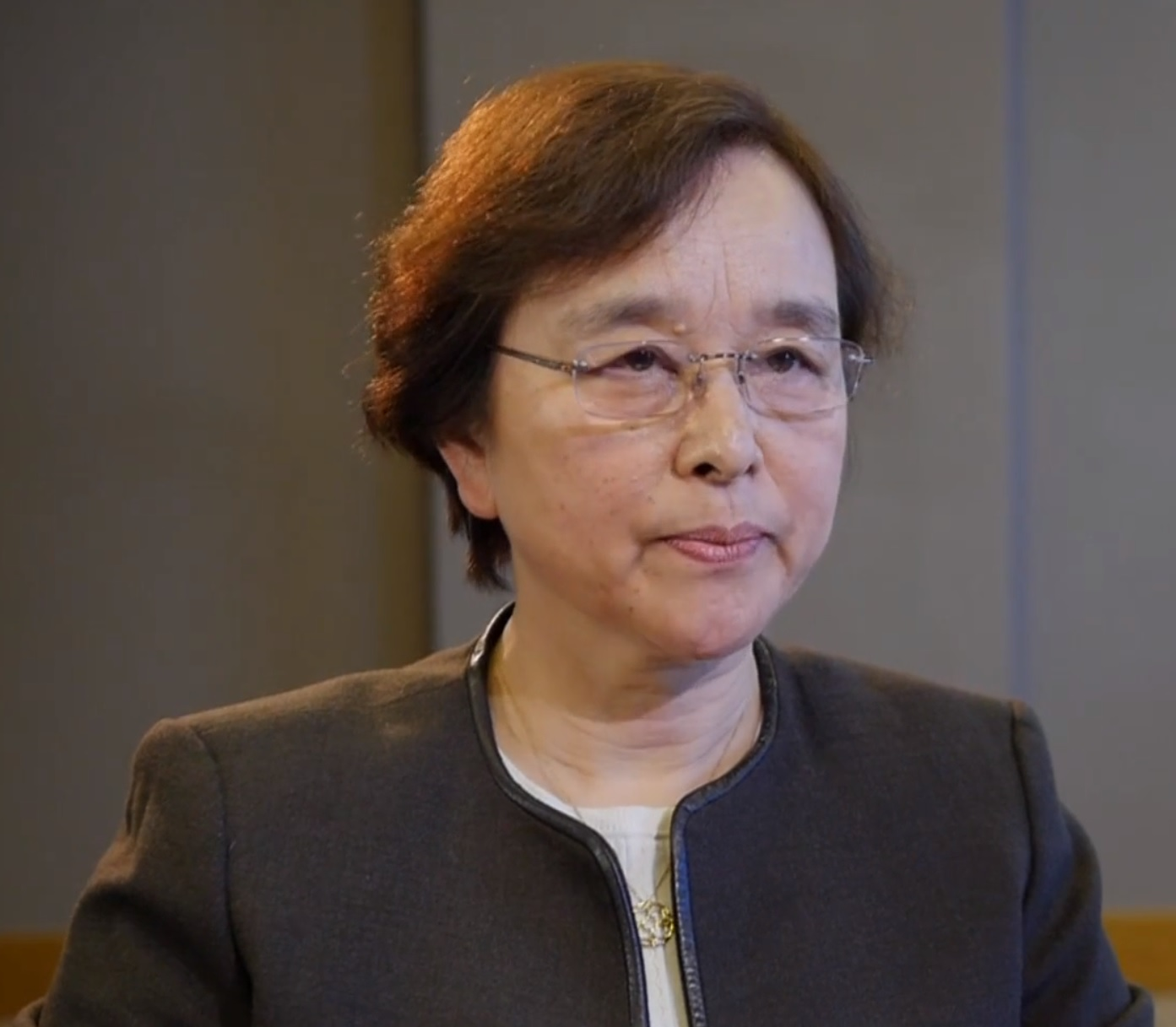
- Jiang at the EPSRC Manufacturing Hub in 2017
- Born: 1955 (age 70–71); Shanghai, China
- Occupation: Metrologist
- Awards: DBE (2017); FREng (2012); FIET (2006)

Academic background
- Education: Huazhong University of Science and Technology (Masters: 1992); Huazhong University of Science and Technology (PhD: 1995); University of Huddersfield (DSc: 2007); University of London (honorary DSc: 2019)
- Thesis: Theory and method for measurement of curved surface topography (1995)

Academic work
- Discipline: Engineering
- Sub-discipline: Precision Metrology
- Institutions: University of Huddersfield; Huazhong University of Science and Technology; University of Birmingham
- Website: https://pure.hud.ac.uk/en/persons/jane-jiang

Dame Xiangqian "Jane" Jiang (Chinese: 蒋向前; pinyin: jiǎng xiàng qián) DBE FREng FIET (born 1955) is a Professor of Precision Metrology at the University of Huddersfield, and the Chief Scientist in the Centre for Precision Technologies. She is the Director of the EPSRC Future Advanced Metrology Hub for Sustainable Manufacturing and is the Royal Academy Engineering/Renishaw Chair in Precision Metrology.

== Education ==
The cultural revolution of Chairman Mao drove Jiang's family out of their home in Shanghai. In 1970 she started her career as an apprentice on a bus production line in China. Here she managed to become a qualified technician and engineer.

She attended Huazhong University of Science and Technology, where she completed a Masters in 1992. Her earlier work was turned into a series of lectures for Changzhou Polytechnic College. She earned her PhD "Theory and method for measurement of curved surface topography" from HUST in 1995.

In 1999, she won an award for the best Ph.D. dissertation of the decade in China. In the same year, the Ministry of Education awarded her a prestigious Changjiang Professorship, which was followed by the Outstanding Young Scientist award from the Chinese National Natural Science Foundation Council.

== Career ==
Jiang's research focuses on the development of mathematical models for metrology as well as new optics to create sensors and hardware. In 1994, she joined City, University of London, working with Professor Ken Grattan. She joined University of Birmingham, working with Professor Kenneth Stout. The group moved to the University of Huddersfield in 1997, where the Centre for Precision Technologies was founded. She became a Professor and head of the surface metrology group in 2003. In 2006, she was invited to meet Queen Elizabeth II at a celebration of people who had made a significant contribution to national life that year. That year, she was appointed a Royal Society Senior Research Fellow.

In 2011, she hosted a two-day Ultra-precision Engineering workshop at the Royal Society. She became Director of the EPSRC National Centre for Innovative Manufacturing in Advanced Metrology. She was appointed the Royal Academy Engineering /Renishaw Chair in Precision Metrology. The five year post involves research inspired by the demands of industry, focussing on measurement and verification of items in the production process.

She spoke at ESOF 2016, Will 2D Materials Change the World?. She secured over £13 million in research funds. She is a Fellow of the Royal Academy of Engineering. In 2017, she became chair of the £30 million EPSRC Future Advanced Metrology hub, which will embed metrology and informatics into the manufacturing value chain. She is a Chartered Engineer. She is a Fellow of the Institution of Engineering and Technology.

She is a Fellow of the Royal Society of Arts and Liveryman with the Worshipful Company of Scientific Instrument Makers. She serves on the editorial board of Nature Light: Science & Applications. She was appointed a Dame in the 2017 Birthday Honours.

== Awards and honours ==
2006 - Royal Society Wolfson Research Merit Award

2006 - Lloyds TSB Outstanding Asian Woman of Achievement Award

2009 - Fellow of Collège International pour la Recherche en Productique

2010 - China - One of the Top Talent Specialist in Science

2012 - Fellow of the Royal Academy of Engineering

2013 - Worshipful Company of Scientific Instrument Makers made her a Freeman of the City of London

2014 - Sir Harold Hartley Medal

2014 - IET Innovation Award 2014 – Manufacturing Technology

2017 - Dame Commander of the Order of the British Empire in the 2017 Birthday Honours
