= Ruth May (nurse) =

British nurse administrator (born 1967)

Dame Ruth May DBE
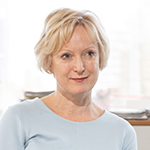

Chief Nursing Officer for England
- In office 7 January 2019 – 25 July 2024
- Deputy: Mark Radford; Duncan Burton; Charlotte McCardle; Acosia Nyanin
- Preceded by: Jane Cummings
- Succeeded by: Duncan Burton

Personal details
- Born: 1 June 1967 (age 59) Wales
- Children: 1
- Profession: Nurse
- Website: Official website

Dame Ruth Rosemarie Beverley, DBE (born 1 June 1967), known professionally as Ruth May, is a British nurse. From 2019 until 2024, she served as the Chief Nursing Officer (CNO) for England and an executive/national director at NHS England and NHS Improvement where she was also the national director responsible for infection prevention and control.

== Career ==
May began her career with a variety of nursing roles before becoming a theatre sister at Frimley Park Hospital in Surrey. She was subsequently acting Director of Nursing at Barnet Hospital in London before being appointed the substantive Director of Nursing and Deputy Chief Executive at Havering Primary Care Trust in North East London.

In October 2005, May became Chief Executive of Queen Elizabeth Hospital, King's Lynn, a post she held for two years. She has also been Chief Executive of Mid-Essex Hospital Services NHS Trust. She also worked as Director of Nursing at Monitor from 2015 to 2016. From April 2016 to 2019 she served as executive director of nursing at NHS Improvement.

She was appointed Chief Nursing Officer (CNO) for England on 7 January 2019, succeeding Jane Cummings. Her role came to public attention during the COVID-19 pandemic. On one occasion during its early stages, she was driven to call for an end to the abuse of nurses by patients.

She led the NHS's "Stop the Pressure" campaign, to reduce the incidence of pressure ulcers in hospital in-patients.

In July 2024, May stood down as Chief Nursing Officer, being replaced by her deputy Duncan Burton.

== Honours and awards ==
May has received honorary doctorates from the Anglia Ruskin University in 2009, the University of Suffolk in 2016 and from Coventry University "for her contribution as a national leader of nursing" in 2019. She became a Fellow of the Queen's Nursing Institute in 2020.

She was appointed Dame Commander of the Order of the British Empire (DBE) in the 2022 Birthday Honours for services to nursing, midwifery and the NHS.

== Personal life ==
She was born in Wales but has lived in Colchester, Essex for most of the 21st century She has a daughter who was eight at the time of May's appointment as CNO.

May is dyslexic, having only been diagnosed as an adult in 2018.

Preceded by Jane Cummings	Chief Nursing Officer for England; 2019–2024	Succeeded by Duncan Burton
