= Donna Kinnair =

British nurse (born 1960s)

Dame Donna Kinnair DBE
- Born: 1961
- Education: Royal London Hospital
- Occupations: Nurse (1983–present); Chief Executive and General Secretary of the Royal College of Nursing (2018-21)
- Children: 3

Professor Dame Donna Kinnair DBE (born 1961) is a British nurse and former Chief Executive and General Secretary of the Royal College of Nursing (RCN). She has specialised in child protection, providing leadership in major hospital trusts in London, teaching, and advising on legal and governmental committees.

== Education and career ==
She initially pursued a maths degree but decided not to complete it. She later returned to education having been encouraged by an occupational health nurse to take up nursing. Kinnair credits her experience growing up with an asthmatic father with showing her the impact nursing could have on people. She attended the Princess Alexandra School of Nursing at the Royal London Hospital in Whitechapel in 1983 to train as a nurse.

Following her training, Kinnair worked with HIV and intensive care patients in east London. She subsequently worked as a health visitor in Hackney, Newham and Tower Hamlets and pursued further studies, gaining a master's degree in medical law and ethics. Her new qualifications led her to focus on child protection in south London. Notably, she was one of four expert advisers in the 2001 Laming inquiry into the death of eight year old Victoria Climbié.

Kinnair held several senior positions in the healthcare sector including:

- Strategic Commissioner for Children's Services at Lambeth, Southwark and Lewisham health authority
- Clinical Director of Emergency Medicine at Barking, Havering and Redbridge University Hospitals Trust
- Executive Director of Nursing, Southeast London Cluster Board
- Director of Commissioning, London Borough of Southwark & Southwark Primary Care Trust

Further to her positions in the healthcare sector, Kinnair has taught medical law, ethics and child protection in multiple countries including Britain, New Zealand, Russia and Kenya. In addition she has provided advice to the UK government on nursing and midwifery such as being part of the Prime Minister's independent commission that published the Front Line Care (Report) in 2010.

In 2015, she was appointed Head of Nursing of the Royal College of Nursing (RCN), after which she was promoted to Director for Nursing, Policy and Practice in 2016. In August 2018, she was appointed acting Chief Executive and General Secretary before being confirmed on a permanent basis in April 2019.

In 2020, Kinnair was recognised for her influence, having been listed in the 2020 Powerlist - which lists the 100 most influential Britons of African/African Caribbean descent. In 2021, Kinnair reached the top 10 of the Powerlist 2021 in recognition of her work during the COVID-19 pandemic.

== Controversies ==
On 14 June 2021, Kinnair was suspended from her duties pending investigation into allegations regarding her conduct. On 15 June 2021, Bruce Carr KC was appointed to investigate the allegations against Kinnair. On 25 June 2021, the RCN Council approved a confidential settlement.

Om 1 July 2021, Kinnair resigned from her role as Chief Executive and General Secretary of the Royal College of Nursing (RCN) following a "period of ill health" due to a cycling incident.

In 2025, Kinnair gave evidence to the UK Covid 19 enquiry. Kinnair confirmed that she had recommended her friend George Farha to the Health Secretary Matt Hancock as a PPE supplier. A philanthropist and Conservative Party donor, Farha had no record of supplying PPE. Kinnair sent multiple WhatsApp messages to Hancock introducing Farha, one highlighting that Farha was a Conservative Party donor and a personal friend of hers. Hancock referred Farha to the High Priority Lane, a system of awarding expedited PPE contracts during the COVID-19 pandemic that was later ruled unlawful by the High Court.

== Awards and honours ==
- Dame Commander of the Order of the British Empire (2008)
- LEGEND CA Award (C. Hub magazine), 2016

== Personal life ==
Kinnair has three children.
