= Kathleen Raven =

British nurse, matron, health official, health care engineer and philanthropist

Dame Kathleen Annie Ingram Raven, DBE, FRCN (9 November 1910, Coniston, Lancashire, England – 19 April 1999, Oxford, England) was a British nurse, matron, government health official, health care engineer, and educational philanthropist.

== Background ==
Kathleen Annie Raven was born and raised in Coniston, Cumbria, attending Ulverston Grammar School. Art was a strong influence on her as a child; her father's mother was personal assistant the painter John Ruskin whilst her mother's father claimed the potter Miles Mason as an ancestor. She was brought up in a Plymouth Brethren household where her parents read a chapter of the Bible every night. She had three brothers with whom she climbed mountains, skated, fished and rowed.

Her elder brother, Ronald Raven, became a surgeon. Visiting her brother when he was a medical student at St Bartholomew's Hospital in London, she decided to become a nurse and started her training there in 1933.

== Career ==
Raven trained as a nurse at St Bartholomew's Hospital in London, qualifying with honours and registering with the General Nursing Council in 1936. She had won a scholarship for midwifery which she also qualified in, working in the local area of East London where she encountered significant poverty.

During World War II she was Ward Sister and Night Superintendent in that hospital where during the war, she was nicknamed 'Pocket Battleship' due to her height and her high standards of patient care. The area was devastated by The Blitz, with Raven blown across the casualty ward when St Bartholomew's was bombed. In 1946 she was appointed Assistant Matron at St Bartholomew's.

In 1949, she was named as Deputy Matron at the General Infirmary, Leeds, where she was swiftly appointed Matron, a post she held for eight years1949-1957. This coincided with the early years of the National Health Service which enabled her to bring in reforms. During 1953 she undertook a 13-week tour to study nursing methods in the United States, Canada and South America. The General Infirmary at Leeds was the first teaching hospital to set up an Assistant Nurse Training Programme in 1955.

While at Leeds she was prominent at a national level. She was a member of both the General Nursing Council (1950-1957) and the Council of the Royal College of Nursing, as Chair of the Yorkshire Branch of the RCN. Raven was also a member of the National Executive Committee of the Association of Hospital Matrons and served as a member of the Leeds Central Area Advisory Board for Secondary Education. For several years she was External Examiner for the Diploma in Nursing at the University of Leeds. In 1957 she became a member of the Central Health Services Council.

Raven became Deputy Chief Nursing Officer, Department of Health (1957-1958) in London, where she became Chief Nursing Officer in July 1958, succeeding Dame Elizabeth Cockayne. She oversaw many changes during her tenure, 1958-1972, such as the introduction of intensive care in 1961 as a direct result of her visits to America. She was instrumental in setting up the Salmon Committee which investigated and reported in 1966 on the structure of nursing management. She commissioned reports on health visitors' training and on, the ratio of patients to nurses. She established the right of matrons to attend meetings of their hospital management committees, which had long been a source of contention

Raven also persuaded Richard Crossman the Health Secretary, to create the Briggs Committee on nurse training which published in 1972. It addressed Raven's concerns on the lack of a career structure for state-enrolled nurses, and it recognised that nurses were needed at all management levels. After her retirement from the Department of Health in 1972, Raven was to be disappointed as the recommendations were not implemented.

Another blow soon after her retirement was the death of her husband. She threw herself into another opportunity, this time with United Medical Enterprise an international health care corporation. She travelled extensively in the Middle East and Far East, establishing health care facilities along British lines (1972-1986). She worked for the Civil Service Commission and was appointed a Governor of Epsom College and of Aylesbury Grammar School.

Raven died at the age of 88 in 1999.

== Personal life ==
In 1959 she married Professor John Thornton Ingram who had created the Dermatological Department at Leeds before accepting the first chair in dermatology at Newcastle. He died in 1972.

== Endowments ==
- Kathleen A Raven Lecture at the Royal College of Nursing to provide a platform for distinguished speakers to promulgate their views on current nursing problems.
- Dame Kathleen Raven Chair in Clinical Nursing was endowed by Raven in 1998, the year before her death. The first holder of the chair was Professor Claire Hale. The most recent holder is Professor Steven Ersser, 2014–2017.

== Honours ==
Her honours included Dame Commander of the Order of the British Empire awarded in 1968; Officer of the Order of St John in 1963; Fellow of the Royal Society of Arts in 1970; Vice-President of the Royal College of Nursing 1972-; Fellow of the Royal College of Nursing in 1986; Freeman of the City of London in 1986 and honorary degrees from Keele University and the University of Leeds. She was made a Patron of the Royal College of Surgeons of England and was an Honorary Freeman of the Worshipful Company of Barbers.
