= Christine Beasley =

British nursing administrator; National Health Service administrator

Dame Christine Joan Beasley, DBE (born 13 June 1944, in Essex, England) is a British nurse and NHS healthcare administrator.

== Career ==
Beasley was educated at Westcliff High School for Girls, Southend-on-Sea, Essex. She began training in 1962 at the Royal London Hospital and worked as a staff nurse. During most of the 1970s she took a career gap to support her young family, returning to work as a district nurse in Ealing in 1979. In the 1980s/early 90s she took on senior roles at the Ealing and Riverside Health Authorities, before moving into wider regional nurse director posts at North Thames Regional Health Authority.

She has held a range of senior posts with a broad experience of policy development, leadership and general management including Head of Development with the Directorate of Health and Social Care and Director of Nursing, Human Resources & Organisational Development with the NHS Executive. She established the London Standing Conference, engaging nurses across the capital in leading service improvement and contributing to improvements in clinical practice across the country.

Beasley was Chief Nursing Officer for England from October 2004 until 2012. She was a strong supporter of the lead provided by nurses in tackling infections of patients in hospitals caused by Methicillin-resistant Staphylococcus aureus in the early 2000s. She sat on the Prime Minister's independent commission that published the Front Line Care (Report) in 2010.

She retired from the civil service in June 2012. Since 2012 Beasley has been a Non-Executive director at the NHS Trust Development Authority, a trustee of the Burdett Trust for Nursing since 2011 and also chair of the London region of Health Education England. She chaired the Florence Nightingale Museum and the council of the University of Buckingham.

She was made a fellow of the Royal College of Nursing in 2012.

In 2020, her continued professional activity included advocacy for improvements to nurse training and retention. Her opinion was that the many nurse vacancies that caused difficulties in dealing with the COVID-19 epidemic were caused by a lack of investment in nursing for over a decade. These included reductions in training places and removal of training bursaries in 2016 as well as poor retention of trained nurses including those from EU countries once Britain decided to leave the EU in 2016.

== Honorary Doctorates ==
Beasley was awarded an Honorary Doctorate from Sheffield Hallam University in 2008 and an Honorary Doctorate of Health from Plymouth University in 2010.

== Affiliations ==
- Honorary Professorship in Nursing, Thames Valley University in 1997
- Governor, Thames Valley University
- Fellow of the Queen's Nursing Institute
- Trustee of Marie Curie Cancer Care

== Damehood ==
She was appointed Dame Commander of the Order of the British Empire (DBE) in the 2008 Birthday Honours.

== Personal life ==
Beasley is the mother of three sons.
