= 1999 Birthday Honours =

British government recognitions

The 1999 Queen's Birthday Honours to celebrate the Queen's Official Birthday were announced on 7 June 1999 in New Zealand and Niue, and on 12 June 1999 in the United Kingdom and other Commonwealth realms.

The recipients of honours are displayed here as they were styled before their new honour, and arranged firstly by the country whose ministers advised the Queen on the appointments, then by honour, with classes (Knight, Knight Grand Cross, etc.) and then divisions (Military, Civil, etc.) as appropriate.

== United Kingdom ==
=== Life peer ===
To be a Baroness

- Usha Kumari Prashar, CBE. Chairman, Parole Board for England and Wales.
- Vivien Helen Stern, CBE. Secretary-General, Penal Reform International.

To be a Baron

- The Right Honourable Sir Robert Fellowes, GCB, GCVO, QSO. Lately Private Secretary to the Queen.
- Sir Norman (Robert) Foster, OM. Architect. Chairman, Foster and Partners.
- Sir (Ernest) Ronald Oxburgh, KBE. Rector, Imperial College of Science, Technology and Medicine.
- Sir Henry Dennistoun (Dennis) Stevenson, CBE. Chairman, Pearson plc and AerFi Group plc.

=== Privy Counsellor ===
- Edward Alan John George. Governor, Bank of England.
- Sir Alan (Gordon Barraclough) Haselhurst MP. Member of Parliament for Saffron Walden, Chairman of Ways and Means and Deputy Speaker.
- Stephen Barry Jones MP. Member of Parliament for Alyn and Deeside.
- Giles Heneage Radice MP. Member of Parliament for Durham North.

=== Knight Bachelor ===
- William Norman Adsetts OBE. Chair of Governors, Sheffield Hallam University. For services to the community in Sheffield.
- Thomas Boaz Allen CBE. For services to Opera.
- John Reginald Hartnell Bond. Group Chairman, HSBC Holdings plc. For services to Banking.
- Hugh Roy Graham Cameron QPM. Chief Constable, Lothian and Borders Police. For services to the Police.
- Frank John Davies CBE. Chairman, Health and Safety Commission. For services to the Health and Safety of the Public.
- Brian Edward Frederick Fender CMG. For services to the University of Keele and the Higher Education Funding Council for England.
- Alexander (Alex) Chapman Ferguson CBE. Manager, Manchester United Football Club. For services to Association Football.
- Anthony Armitage Greener. Chairman, Diageo. For services to the Drinks Industry.
- Maurice Hatter. Chairman, IMO Precision Controls Ltd. For public services.
- Kenneth Joseph Jackson. General Secretary, Amalgamated Engineering and Electrical Union. For services to Industrial Relations.
- Gordon Ronald Jarvis. For charitable services.
- Philip Stevens Ledger CBE. Principal, Royal Scottish Academy of Music and Drama. For services to Music.
- Professor John Stanley Marsh CBE. For services to the Agricultural Industry and to Agricultural Education.
- Trevor McDonald OBE. For services to Broadcasting and Journalism.
- Paul Maxime Nurse. Director-General, Imperial Cancer Research Fund. For services to Cell Biology and to Cancer Research.
- David Joseph O'Dowd CBE QPM. HM Chief Inspector of Constabulary (England and Wales). For services to Community Relations and to Standards within the Police.
- Professor Robert Keith O'Nions FRS. Professor of the Physics and Chemistry of Minerals, University of Oxford. For services to the Earth Sciences.
- Professor Richard Peto FRS. For services to Epidemiology and to Cancer Prevention.
- John Weddell Robb. Chairman, British Energy plc. For services to the Energy Industry.
- The Honourable David Sieff. For services to the National Lottery Charities Board.
- Robert Haldane Smith. For services to the National Museums of Scotland.
- Robin Richard Tilt. Lately Director General, HM Prison Service, Home Office.
- Professor Bernard Arthur Owen Williams. Emeritus Professor of Moral Philosophy and Fellow of All Souls College University of Oxford. For services to Philosophy.
- David Reeve Williams CBE. Leader, London Borough of Richmond upon Thames. For services to Local Government and to the Local Government Association.

==== Diplomatic and Overseas List ====
- Arthur Gilbert. For services to the arts and culture.
- The Honourable Mr Justice Noel Plunkett Power. Lately Acting-Chief Justice, Hong Kong.

=== Order of the Bath (Military Division) ===
==== Knight Grand Cross (GCB) ====
Royal Navy

- Admiral Sir Michael Cecil Boyce KCB OBE ADC.

==== Knight Commander (KCB) ====
Royal Navy

- Admiral Nigel Richard Essenhigh.

Army

- Lieutenant-General John Freegard Deverell OBE (480284), late The Light Infantry.

==== Companion (CB) ====
Royal Navy

- Rear Admiral Peter Michael Franklyn MVO.
- Rear Admiral Alastair Boyd Ross CBE.

Army

- Major General Christopher Leslie Elliott MBE (483896), late Corps of Royal Engineers.
- Major General Robert William Montgomery Mcafee (479425), late Royal Tank Regiment.
- Major General John Douglas Stokoe CBE (486748), late Royal Corps of Signals.

Royal Air Force

- Air Vice-Marshal Brian Campbell Mccandless CBE.
- Air Vice-Marshal Patrick John O'Reilly.

=== Order of the Bath (Civil Division) ===
==== Knight Commander (KCB) ====
- Michael George Bichard. Permanent Secretary, Department for Education and Employment.
- James Christopher Jenkins CB QC. First Parliamentary Counsel, Parliamentary Counsel Office.
- John Michael Medlicott Vereker CB. Permanent Secretary, Department for International Development.

==== Companion (CB) ====
- George Bertram. Director, National Insurance Contributions Office, HM Board of Inland Revenue.
- Edgar Vincent Buckley. Assistant Under Secretary (Home and Overseas), Ministry of Defence.
- David Chesterton. For services to the Department for Culture, Media and Sport.
- Edward John Watson Gieve. Director, Public Services Directorate, HM Treasury.
- Colin Cameron Macdonald. Principal Establishment Officer, Scottish Office.
- John Cameron McCluskie QC. First Scottish Parliamentary Counsel, and lately Legal Secretary to the Lord Advocate.
- David Edgar Joseph Nissen. Solicitor and Director General, Legal Services, Department of Trade and Industry.
- Gillian Mae Noble. Deputy Director, Public Services Directorate, HM Treasury.
- Norman Patrick Roberts. For public service.
- John Turner. Director, Jobcentre Services Employment Service, Department for Education and Employment.

=== Order of St Michael and St George ===
==== Dame Commander (DCMG) ====
- Rosemary Jane Spencer. CMG, H.M. Ambassador, The Hague.

==== Knight Commander (KCMG) ====
- Adrian John Beamish, CMG, lately H.M. Ambassador, Mexico City.
- Anthony Charles Galsworthy, CMG, H.M. Ambassador, Peking.
- David Glyndwr John. For services to British interests overseas.
- Sydney Woolf Kentridge, QC. For services to international law and justice.

==== Companion (CMG) ====
- David William Brewer. Lately Chairman, Sedgwick Insurance and Risk Management Consultants (China) Ltd. For services to Export.
- Nicholas Walker Browne. Chargé d'Affaires, Tehran.
- Dr John Miguel Warwick Chipman. Director, International Institute for Strategic Studies.
- Basil Stephen Talbot Eastwood. HM Ambassador Damascus.
- Cyril Glasser. For services to international law and justice.
- Robert Anthony Eagleson Gordon OBE. HM Ambassador Rangoon.
- John Douglas Kelso Grant. Lately Principal Private Secretary to the Secretary of State for Foreign and Commonwealth Affairs.
- Gregory David Green. Director General, Voluntary Service Overseas.
- Professor David Harris. Director, Nottingham University Human Rights Centre.
- Charles Thomas William Humfrey. Minister, HM Embassy Tokyo.
- Ian Mcleod OBE MC. Lately Head of European Commission Monitoring Mission and Member of the Kosovo Verification Mission.
- Peter Forbes Ricketts. Deputy Political Director, Foreign and Commonwealth Office.
- John Philip Watson. Counsellor, Foreign and Commonwealth Office.

=== Royal Victorian Order ===
==== Knight Commander (KCVO) ====
- Major General Peter Aldcroft Downward CB DSO DFC. Governor of the Military Knights of Windsor.
- Christopher Kingston Howes CB CVO. Second Commissioner and Chief Executive, Crown Estate.
- Lieutenant-Colonel Walter Hugh Malcolm Ross CVO OBE. Comptroller, Lord Chamberlain's Office.

==== Commander (CVO) ====
- John Hepworth Holroyd CB. Secretary. For Appointments to the Prime Minister.
- Stephen Mark Jeffrey Lamport. Private Secretary and Treasurer to the Prince of Wales.
- The Very Reverend Gilleasbuig Iain Macmillan. Chaplain to The Queen in Scotland and Dean of the Order of the Thistle.
- Lucy Annora Murphy LVO. Information Officer, Household of Queen Elizabeth The Queen Mother.
- Felicity Margaret Salisbury Murdo-Smith LVO. Information Officer, Press Office, Buckingham Palace.

==== Lieutenant (LVO) ====
- The Reverend William James Booth. Sub-Dean of Her Majesty's Chapels Royal and Domestic Chaplain.
- Dr Michael Charles de St Pierre Bunbury. Medical Practitioner.
- Chief Inspector Stephen Orme Burgess MVO. Royalty Protection Department, Metropolitan Police.
- Robert Cook MVO. Lately Inventory Clerk, Windsor Castle.
- Frederick Donald Fox. Milliner.
- William Edward Robin Hood Hastings-Bass, The Earl of Huntingdon. Racehorse Trainer.
- Malcolm Metcalfe. Member of the Canadian Steering Committee of The Duke of Edinburgh's Commonwealth Study Conference.
- Araminta Mary Ritchie. Lady in Waiting to the Princess Royal.
- The Reverend John Phillips Robson. Chaplain of The Queen's Chapel of the Savoy and Chaplain of the Royal Victorian Order.
- Robert Forbes Taylor. Trustee, United Kingdom Fund of The Duke of Edinburgh's Commonwealth Study Conference.

==== Member (MVO) ====
- Helen Elizabeth Asprey. Secretary to the Equerry to The Duke of Edinburgh.
- Roy Brown. Maintenance Manager, Buckingham Palace and Royal Mews.
- Jean Young Clark. Secretary to the Crown Equerry.
- Norman Robert Cooper. Gentleman of the Chapel Royal St James's Palace.
- Anne Rae Gordon. Secretary to the Lord Lieutenant of Tyne and Wear.
- Maureen Patricia Holland. Secretary, Household of The Princess Margaret Countess of Snowdon.
- Squadron Leader Jeremy David Marshall. Lately Pilot, 32 (The Royal) Squadron, Royal Air Force.
- Fiona Frances McNeile. Secretary, Royal Farms Windsor.
- Chief Superintendent David Stanley Reeve. Norfolk Constabulary.
- Lisa Penelope Sharp. Secretary, Household of The Prince Edward.
- Amanda Charlotte Yaxley. Lately Personnel and Administrative Manager, Household of The Prince of Wales

=== Royal Victorian Medal (RVM) ===
- David James Benefer. Glasshouse Manager, Sandringham Estate.
- Yeoman Warder Peter Birch. Chapel Clerk, Chapel Royal, HM Tower of London.
- Gerald Blomfield. Hairdresser.
- James Albert Cox. Maintenance Officer, Windsor Castle.
- Stephen Henry Ronald Marshall. Assistant Yeoman of the Royal Pantries.
- James Alexander Mcdonald. Painter, Balmoral Estate.
- David Arthur Pithers. Woodman, Crown Estate, Windsor.
- Robert Rowlands. Stud Groom, Royal Studs.
- Colin John Seymour. Painter, Crown Estate, Windsor.
- John Thomas. Estate Maintenance, Yorkshire Survey, Duchy of Lancaster.

=== Order of the British Empire (Military Division) ===
==== Knight Commander (KBE) ====
Royal Air Force

- Air Marshal John Alexander Baird.

==== Commander (CBE) ====
Royal Navy

- Commodore Christopher Richard Beagley.
- Commodore Alastair John Sym Taylor OBE.

Army

- Brigadier Jane Mary Arigho RRC (484286), late Queen Alexandra's Royal Army Nursing Corps.
- Colonel John Harry Crosland MC (483886), late The Parachute Regiment.
- Brigadier Andrew Stephenson Ritchie (495574), late Royal Regiment of Artillery.
- Colonel David William Wonson (477861), late Adjutant General's Corps (Royal Military Police).

Royal Air Force

- Air Commodore Nigel David Alan Maddox.
- Air Commodore Malcolm Prissick.
- Air Vice-Marshal Graham Skinner MBE.

==== Officer (OBE) ====
Royal Navy

- Commander Duncan Ford.
- Commander Peter Gordon Hadden.
- Commander (now Acting-Captain) Peter Haydn Jones.
- Commander Christopher Fields Mervik.
- Commander (now Captain) Carolyn Jane Stait.
- Commander Barry Valentine Stonham.
- Major (Local Lieutenant-Colonel) Richard Alan Waterer, Royal Marines.

Army

- Lieutenant-Colonel Gary Peter Cass (498149), The Royal Regiment of Fusiliers.
- Lieutenant-Colonel Thomas Andrew David Frizell (523938), Adjutant General's Corps (Staff and Personnel Support).
- Lieutenant-Colonel Robert Charles Hart (485907), Corps of Royal Engineers.
- Lieutenant-Colonel Robert William Killick (492351), Corps of Royal Engineers.
- Lieutenant-Colonel Noel McCleery (512388), The Royal Dragoon Guards.
- Lieutenant-Colonel Ian Andrew McPherson BEM (525095), The Royal Logistic Corps.
- Colonel Iain Gregory Robertson (491037), late Royal Army Medical Corps, Territorial Army.
- Lieutenant-Colonel Simon Walter Lamb Strickland (483554), The King's Own Royal Border Regiment.
- Lieutenant-Colonel Murdo Norfolk Soulsby Urquhart (504517), The King's Own Royal Border Regiment.
- Lieutenant-Colonel Michael John Vacher (493795), Royal Regiment of Artillery.
- Lieutenant-Colonel (Acting-Colonel) Jennifer Margaret Wells (497786), Royal Army Medical Corps.

Royal Air Force

- Wing Commander James Dennis Arkell (5201014 R).
- Wing Commander Thomas Leonard Boyle (8026463 E).
- Wing Commander Ricardo Dominic Cobelli (5202812 Y).
- Squadron-Leader Paul Day AFC (4231352 G).
- Wing Commander Peter John Hereford (8098223 J).
- Wing Commander The Honourable David Paul Murray MBE (8023715 Q).
- Wing Commander Edward John Scaplehorn (5204079 J).

Overseas Award

- Lieutenant-Colonel Dennis Duarte (G R7092), The Royal Gibraltar Regiment.

==== Member (MBE) ====
Royal Navy

- Lieutenant-Commander Michael Peter Abbey.
- Warrant Officer 2nd Class Keith Armstrong, Royal Marine Reserves (P992506 A).
- Lieutenant (Acting-Lieutenant-Commander) Mark Edward Arnold.
- Petty Officer (Acting-Chief Petty Officer) Tactical Systems Submarines Stephen David Bell (D191998 V).
- Warrant Officer (Marine Engineering Artificer) (Mechanical) Martin James Briddon (D109639 X).
- Lieutenant Richard Robert Clements, Royal Naval Reserve.
- Chief Petty Officer Wren Writer Sharon Lesley Cunningham (W133894 L).
- Colour Sergeant (Local Warrant Officer 2nd Class) David William Godfrey, Royal Marines (P022892 G).
- Lieutenant-Commander (Sea Cadet Corps) Peter Gooding, Royal Naval Reserve.
- Lieutenant (now Lieutenant-Commander) Martin Richard London.
- Captain Ian Robert Macdonald, Royal Marines.
- Lieutenant-Commander Francis George McNaughton.
- Lieutenant-Commander Martin Nicholas Moore.
- Warrant Officer (Coxswain) (Submarines) John David Morton (D116914 Y).
- The Reverend Garth Stephen Petzer.
- Warrant Officer (Steward) Gary Slater (D154857 S)
- Warrant Officer (Weapon Engineering Artificer) Brian Stephen Taylor (D128081 Q)
- Lieutenant-Commander Graham Francis Woodbridge.

Army

- Major Andrew Alexander Allen (519624), Corps of Royal Electrical and Mechanical Engineers.
- Major Mall Adam Archibald (503744), The Royal Highl and Fusiliers.
- Captain David Ashton (545751), The King's Royal Hussars.
- Major Adrian John Battley (523853), The Royal Logistic Corps.
- Captain Derek Binks (541049), The Royal Logistic Corps.
- 24821694 Lance Corporal Carl Blezard, Corps of Royal Engineers.
- Major Richard Hugh Walter St George Bodington (512574), Welsh Guards.
- 24399764 Warrant Officer Class1 Edward William Bradley, The Highlanders.
- Major Nicholas Seymour Chapman (508156), The Cheshire Regiment.
- 24413733 Warrant Officer Class 2 Ashok Kumar Chauhan, Royal Regiment of Artillery.
- Major Timothy Austin Coles (498252), The Black Watch.
- Major John Lonsdale Collier (519902), The Royal Logistic Corps.
- 24557516 Warrant Officer Class 2 Eamonn Charles Coogan, The Royal Irish Regiment.
- Major James Michael Cowan (517898), The Black Watch.
- Major Anthony James Crease BEM. (519166), The Royal Scots Dragoon Guards.
- Major John Angus Currie (523700), The King's Own Scottish Borderers.
- Major (Acting-Lieutenant-Colonel) Dermot James Cusack (501578), The Light Dragoons.
- Major (now Lieutenant-Colonel) Nicholas Roy Davies MC (510308), The Parachute Regiment.
- Major Stephen Davies (506829), The Queen's Lancashire Regiment.
- Major John Edwin Devereux (509169), Corps of Royal Engineers.
- 24771371 Lance Corporal (now Corporal) Leslie Frederick Doherty, Royal Army Medical Corps.
- Major Hugh Swithin Evans (521620), The Royal Regiment of Fusiliers.
- Captain Harry Fecitt TD (468262), Intelligence Corps, Territorial Army.
- 24468530 Colour Sergeant Brendan Loyola Fleming, The Royal Irish Regiment.
- 24714188 Staff Sergeant Paul Andrew Follan, Adjutant General's Corps (Royal Military Police).
- Captain David Robert Gorton (545664), Adjutant General's Corps (Staff and Personnel Support).
- Major Johnathon James Robert Gout (485730), The Royal Logistic Corps.
- Captain Jonathan William George Griffiths (547226), Corps of Royal Electrical and Mechanical Engineers.
- 24174591 Warrant Officer Class 2 Robert Philip Guillou, The Royal Yeomanry, Territorial Army.
- 24399961 Warrant Officer Class 1 Gary Haxby, The Prince of Wales's Own Regiment of Yorkshire.
- Major David Ian Hollas (507462), The Royal Logistic Corps.
- 24817782 Corporal Jason Nicol Horton, Corps of Royal Electrical and Mechanical Engineers.
- 24392861 Sergeant Alan Jack, Adjutant General's Corps (Staff and Personnel Support).
- Major Henry Jones (530181), The Royal Logistic Corps.
- Major Craig Randall King CD (T75487960), Princess Patricia's Canadian Light Infantry.
- Major Wendy Anne Legassick (490006), Adjutant General's Corps (Staff and Personnel Support).
- 24651514 Sergeant David Stephen Lear, The Princess of Wales's Royal Regiment.
- Major Jeremy Lionel John Levine (512636), Grenadier Guards.
- Major Nigel David Linge (534718), Royal Regiment of Artillery.
- 24577778 Warrant Officer Class1 Robert Menick Lochinger, Adjutant General's Corps (Staff and Personnel Support).
- Major John Quentin Lockwood (501638), The Staffordshire Regiment.
- 24472866 Warrant Officer Class 1 (now Captain) Andrew James Mackay, The Highlanders.
- Major David Francis Minden (537852), Royal Army Medical Corps.
- Major Julian Douglas Sheridan Moir (511511), The King's Royal Hussars.
- 24560733 Sergeant Balbir Singh Nagra, The Royal Anglian Regiment, Territorial Army.
- Major Ian Alexander Orr (504490), The King's Own Scottish Borderers.
- Major John Foster Pelton (514731), Corps of Royal Engineers.
- 24397771 Corporal Geoffrey Peter Richards, Royal Corps of Signals.
- Major Timothy John Julian Saunders (501688), The Devonshire and Dorset Regiment.
- 24328168 Warrant Officer Class 1 Ian Stobbs, Corps of Royal Engineers.
- Captain Alexander Taylor (537755), Royal Regiment of Artillery.
- 24451327 Warrant Officer Class 2 Paul Joseph Taylor, Corps or Royal Electrical and Mechanical Engineers.
- 24666783 Warrant Officer Class 2 John Stephen Tovey, The Parachute Regiment, Territorial Army.
- 24577289 Staff Sergeant Joseph Robert Toward, The Royal Scots Dragoon Guards.
- 24579377 Warrant Officer Class 2 Michael John Whitehead, Adjutant General's Corps (Military Provost Staff).
- Captain Steven Willingham (542250), The Royal Logistic Corps.
- Major James Michael George Willis (518979), The Green Howards.
- 24625964 Corporal Ralph Yardley, The Argyll and Sutherland Highlanders.
- 24408569 Warrant Officer Class 1 Ian Stuart Young, Army Physical Training Corps.

Royal Air Force

- Squadron Leader Peter Wilcock Berry (8100132 K).
- Flight Lieutenant Simon Peter Braun (8300107 K).
- Corporal Robert Leslie Eaton (Q8212184).
- Sergeant John William Gall (H8215060).
- Squadron Leader Roger Leslie Gilbert (4232603 L).
- Flight Lieutenant Peter Lawrence Hackett (8029435 R).
- Chief Technician David Anthony Harrigan (H8104699).
- Flight Sergeant Michael John Harris (W0688913).
- Squadron Leader Terence Heslin (8073047 R).
- Flight Lieutenant John James Hill (8106521 H).
- Warrant Officer Stephen Hughes BEM (N0687891).
- Flight Sergeant David Allan Hume (R8205920).
- Sergeant William Jeffrey (H8001266).
- Sergeant Andrew Jenkins (G8229455).
- Warrant Officer John Pollock Mackie (Q0594395).
- Flight Sergeant Robert Philip Pearson (D8141765).
- Corporal David Pickett (S8286088).
- Warrant Officer David Aubrey Rees BEM (H8093939).
- Flight Lieutenant Shaun Michael Ryles (8024328 R).
- Warrant Officer Martyn Skelton (M1948684).
- Squadron Leader Damian John Steel (2629474F).
- Warrant Officer Peter Stevens BEM (K1944268).
- Flight Sergeant John Stuart Welton (Q8008040).
- Warrant Officer Brian Wheeler BEM (D4262938).
- Chief Technician John Young (J8175236).

=== Order of the British Empire (Civil Division) ===
==== Knight Grand Cross (GBE) ====
- The Right Honourable Sir Stephen Brown. For services to the Family Court System.

==== Dame Commander (DBE) ====
- Antonia Susan Byatt CBE. Author. For services to Literature.
- Mavis Grant. Headteacher, Mary Trevelyan Primary School, Newcastle upon Tyne. For services to Education.
- Norma Christina Elizabeth Major. For charitable services, especially MENCAP.
- Yvonne Moores. Chief Nursing Officer, Department of Health. For services to the Nursing Profession.
- Helen May Reeves OBE. For services to the Victim Support Movement.
- Professor Lesley Jill Southgate. General Medical Practitioner, London. For services to Standards of Practice and to Primary Care.
- Maureen Elizabeth, Lady Thomas. For political, cultural and charitable services.

==== Knight Commander (KBE) ====
- The Right Honourable William Francis, Baron Deedes of Aldington MC DL. For services to Journalism and to humanitarian causes.

==== Commander (CBE) ====
- Gerald Acher. Senior Partner, KPMG London Office and Vice Chairman, Motability. For services to Transport for Disabled People.
- Stephen James Lister Adamson. For services to the Insolvency Profession.
- Professor Michael William Adler. Chairman, National AIDS Trust; Professor of Genito-Urinary Medicine. For services to the Treatment of People with AIDS.
- Craigie Ronald John Aitchison. Painter. For services to Art.
- Paul Percival Altobell. Lately Chief Executive, Defence Analytical Services Agency, Ministry of Defence.
- Professor John Maxwell Anderson. Chairman, Building Regulations Advisory Committee. For services to Building and the Development of Building Regulations.
- William Ashworth. Chairman, East Lancashire Health Authority. For services to Health Care.
- Professor Alan David Baddeley FRS. Professor of Psychology, University of Bristol. For services to the Study of Human Memory.
- Joan Dawson Bakewell. For services to Broadcasting, Journalism and the Arts.
- Joseph Brian Baldwin. Chairman, National Employers' Organisation and Joint Chairman National Joint Council for Local Government Services. For services to Local Government.
- Professor Jangu Edal Banatvala. Professor of Clinical Virology, United Medical and Dental Schools. For services to the Prevention of Viral Hepatitis.
- John Charles Barnard. Collector, Thames Valley, HM Board of Customs and Excise.
- Dennis Bate. Managing Director, Bovis North. For services to the New Deal.
- Professor John Oliver Bayley. For services to English Literature.
- Robin Bidwell. Chairman, Environmental Resources Management Ltd. For services to the Environment.
- James Craig Brown. For services to Association Football.
- John Pattie Bennet Bryce. Assistant Director, HM Board of Inland Revenue.
- Deborah Clare Bull. For services to Dance.
- Simon Philip Hugh Callow. Actor and Director. For services to Drama.
- Professor Averil Millicent Cameron. Warden, Keble College, University of Oxford. For services to Classical Scholarship.
- Professor Ian Rennell Cameron. Vice Chancellor, University of Wales College of Medicine. For services to Respiratory Medicine and to Higher Education.
- Professor Melhado Chevannes. For services to Multi-Cultural Nursing.
- Lawrence Richard Christensen. Logistics Director, Safeway Stores plc; President, Freight Transport Association. For services to the Freight Transport and Logistics Industry.
- Professor Eric McCredie Clive. Commissioner, Scottish Law Commission.
- David Bilsland Cobb, JP. Executive Chairman, James Fisher & Sons pic. For services to Shipping and the Shipbuilding Industry.
- Michael Herbert Collier. Chief Executive, One NorthEast and lately Chief Executive, Funding Agency for Schools. For services to Education.
- His Honour Judge Paul Howard Collins. Director of Studies, Judicial Studies Board.
- Allan Vincent Cannon Cook. Technical Director, Accounting Standards Board. For services to the Accountancy Profession.
- Christopher Cosgrave. Headteacher, St. John the Divine Primary School, Lambeth, London. For services to Education.
- Thomas Peter Robin Crane. Chairman, Royal Society for Nature Conservation. For services to Wildlife Conservation.
- Hilary Mary Cropper. Chief Executive, FI Group. For services to the Finance Industry.
- Professor Anthony John Culyer. For services to Research and Development in the NHS.
- John Deacon. Director General, British Phonographic Industry Limited. For services to the Music Industry.
- Christopher Drinkwater. General Medical Practitioner, Newcastle upon Tyne. For services to Medicine.
- Norman Fraser Duncan. Lately Head of Branch, Social Care Group, Department of Health.
- Norman Nicolson Wallace Dunlop. For services to the Engineering Construction Industry Training Board.
- Professor Dianne Edwards FRS. Distinguished Research Professor of Palaeobotany, University of Wales, Cardiff. For services to Botany.
- Margaret Elliott. For services to Business.
- Gordon David Etherington. Lately Chief Crown Prosecutor, Crown Prosecution Service.
- Terry Farrage. Head, Immigration Service Ports Directorate, Home Office.
- Christopher Ernest Fay. Lately Chairman and Chief Executive, Shell UK Ltd. For services to the Offshore Gas and Oil Industry.
- Sydney John Ford. Chief Executive, Driver and Vehicle Licensing Agency, Department for the Environment Transport and the Regions.
- Lady Antonia Fraser (Lady Antonia Pinter). Writer. For services to Literature.
- Arthur Michael Johnstone Galsworthy, DL. Chairman, Trewithen Estates Management Company and Chairman, The In Pursuit of Excellence Partnership for Cornwall. For services to the community in Cornwall.
- Professor Peter Bryan Garland. For services to Cancer Research and to Biotechnology.
- Anthony John Gavin. Headteacher, St. Margaret's Academy Livingston. For services to Developing Standards in Education.
- Christopher John Gorringe. Chief Executive, All England Lawn Tennis and Croquet Club. For services to Lawn Tennis.
- David Roger Grayson, OBE. Chairman, National Disability Council. For services to Disabled People.
- Douglas Eric George Griffiths. Commissioner and Deputy Chief Executive, The Crown Estate.
- Christopher James Hampton. Playwright. For services to Literature.
- Eric Ronald Hassall, DSC. Chairman, British Geological Survey. For services to Business/Science Links.
- David George Heywood. Chairman, Remploy Ltd. For services to the Employment of Disabled People.
- Rodney Irad Hills. Leader, York City Council. For services to Local Government and the City of York.
- Barbara Nancy Hosking, OBE. For services to Women's Issues and to Broadcasting.
- Professor John Wallace Hunt. For services to Management Development.
- Philip John Hunter. Director of Education, Staffordshire County Council. For services to Education.
- Ann James. For services to Social Welfare.
- David Charles Jones. Chief Executive, Next plc. For services to the Retail Industry and the community.
- Julia Elizabeth King. Managing Director, Rolls-Royce Fan Systems. For services to Materials Engineering.
- Brian Langdon. HM Chief Inspector of Mines, Health and Safety Executive Department for the Environment, Transport and the Regions.
- Professor Meirion Francis Lewis. Lately Senior Fellow, Defence Evaluation and Research Agency, Ministry of Defence.
- Professor Margot Ruth Aline Lister. Professor of Social Policy, Loughborough University. For services to Social Issues.
- Professor Derek Alfred Walter Lovejoy. For services to Landscape Architecture.
- Professor Rona McLeod Mackie. Professor of Dermatology, University of Glasgow. For services to Dermatology and Melanoma Research.
- Michael John Marshall DL. For services to the Engineering Industry and to the community in Cambridgeshire.
- Gavin George Masterton. Treasurer and Managing Director, Bank of Scotland. For services to Banking.
- George Henry Moore TD. For services to the NHS.
- Jan Morris. For services to Literature.
- Robert Harry Beale Neame DL. Chairman, Shepherd Neame Ltd. For services to the Brewing Industry, Tourism and the community.
- John Newing QPM. Chief Constable, Derbyshire Constabulary. For services to the Police.
- Christopher John Oakley. Chief Executive, Regional Independent Newspapers. For services to the Newspaper Industry.
- Wallace Olins. For services to the use of Design in Business.
- Christopher Stuart Parker. Headteacher, Nottingham High School and Chairman Advisory Group on Independent/State School Partnerships. For services to Education.
- Chaitanya Patel. For services to the Development of Social Care Policies.
- Catherine Eleanor Porteous. For services to the Arts and to the National Council for One Parent Families.
- Robert Andrew Prickett. Lately Chief Crown Prosecutor for Wales, Crown Prosecution Service.
- Barbara Davis Rae. Artist. For services to Art.
- Colin Leslie Reeves. Director, Finance and Performance, NHS Executive, Department of Health.
- David William Richardson. For services to the British Chambers of Commerce.
- Professor Elizabeth Mary Russell. For services to Public Health Medicine.
- James Gordon Russell, QFSM. Lately Chief Fire Officer, Lancashire Fire and Rescue Service. For services to the Fire Service.
- Bryan Kaye Sanderson. Chief Executive, BP-AMOCO Chemicals. For services to the Chemical Industry.
- Iain David Saville. Chief Executive Officer, Crestco. For services to the Finance Industry.
- Sukhdev Sharma. For services to Community Relations.
- Thomas Joseph Shaw. For public service.
- Roy Derek Shelley. Business Group Director, GKN Westland Helicopters Ltd. For services to the Defence Industry.
- Anne Odling-Smee. For services to Education.
- Grahame Reginald Smith DL. Lately Director, Head of Sellafield Site BNFL. For services to BNFL and to the community in Cumbria.
- Juliet Anne Virginia Stevenson. Actress. For services to Drama.
- John Honeyman Swainson. Assistant Director, Department of Social Security.
- David Malcolm Taylor. Assistant Chief Veterinary Officer, Ministry of Agriculture, Fisheries and Food.
- Keith John Thomas. Director of Highways, Welsh Office.
- Margaret Elspeth Thomas. For services to the British Red Cross Society.
- John Robin Thompson. Director, Strategic Planning, Kent County Council. For services to Town and Country Planning.
- David James Knights Trench. Site and Structures Director, Millennium Dome. For services to the Construction Industry.
- Alan George Tritton DL. For services to Anglo/Indian Relations and to the Preservation of the Cultural Heritage.
- Michael John Turner. Executive Director, British Aerospace plc. For services to the Aerospace Industry.
- Frederick Alfred John Emery-Wallis. Leader, Hampshire County Council. For services to the community in Hampshire.
- Martin Robert Weale. Director, National Institute of Economic and Social Research. For services to Economics.
- David Welch. Chief Executive, Royal Parks Agency, Department for Culture, Media and Sport.
- Andrew Williamson. Director of Social Services, Devon. For services to Social Services.
- John Wilson. SCS, Ministry of Defence.
- Canon Kenyon Edward Wright. For services to Constitutional Reform and Devolution in Scotland.

==== Officer (OBE) ====
- Charles Henry Adams. For services to Community Relations.
- Lewis Drummond Adams, Training Consultant, Millennium Drivers. For services to the Railway Industry and to Employee Relations.
- David Alderdice. For services to Local Government.
- Dominic Allen. For services to Sport.
- Professor William Allen Alsop. For services to Architecture.
- David James Charles Anderson, Head of Education, Victoria and Albert Museum. For services to Museums.
- Professor Michael Anderson, Professor of Economic and Social History, University of Edinburgh. For services to Education.
- William F.T. Anderson, Chairman, Aberlour Child Care Trust. For services to Child Welfare.
- Professor Desmond Brian Archer. For services to Ophthalmic Surgery.
- Ernest Robin Asprey, Lately Grade7, Intervention Board, Ministry of Agriculture, Fisheries and Food.
- Gerald Atkins, Group Business Development Director, Vivendi plc. For services to the Environment through Combined Heat and Power.
- Anne Ayris, Lately Grade7, Ministry of Defence.
- Carys Margaret Bannister, Consultant Neurosurgeon. For services to Neurosurgery in Manchester.
- Mervyn Barrett. For services to the National Association. For the Care and Resettlement of Offenders.
- John Barry (Jonathan Prendergast), Composer. For services to Music.
- Bernard William James Baxter JP. For services to the Magistracy in North Tyneside.
- Brian Beanland, Chairman, Park Royal Partnership. For services to Business and to Regeneration in London.
- Moira Beattie. For services to Macmillan Nursing in Peterborough, Cambridgeshire.
- Samantha Mary Constance Beckett, Range F, HM Treasury. For services to the Diana Princess of Wales Memorial Committee.
- Sister Dorothy Bell. For services to Education.
- Maeve Bell. For services to Consumers.
- John Peter Bevan, Corporate Communications Executive, Sony (UK) Manufacturing. For services to Industry and to the community in Bridgend, South Wales.
- John Leslie Bird. For services to the Corporation of London and to charities.
- Don Black, Lyricist. For services to Music.
- William Lilly Black. For services to the University of Kingston-upon-Hull.
- Professor Frederick Wilgar Boal. For services to Regional Planning and Urban Development.
- Kenneth Bodfish, Member, Brighton and Hove Unitary Authority. For services to International Affairs in Local Government.
- Robert David Bolton. For services to the Community.
- Paul Max Bonner. For services to Broadcasting.
- Edward Martin Bowen. For services to Secondary Education.
- Julia Bracewell. For services to Sport, especially Fencing.
- Professor Ian Bremner, Deputy Director (Science), Rowett Research Institute. For services to Biological Science.
- Professor Fred Brown FRS. For services to the Spongiform Encephalopathy Advisory Committee.
- Kennedy John Henry Brown, Clerk of the Public Accounts Committee, House of Commons.
- Mungo Bryson. Farmer. For services to Agriculture and to the community in Kirkcudbright.
- Anthony Francis Burgess, Lately Area Administrator, Crown Prosecution Service.
- David James Carr. For services to the community in Staffordshire.
- Anthony Nicholas George Duckworth-Chad DL. For services to the Country Landowners' Association and to the Rural Community.
- Ernest John Chumrow, Chairman, Waltham Forest Housing Action Trust. For services to the Regeneration of Waltham Forest.
- Margaret Anita Clark (Mrs. Walton), Director, Countryside Agency. For services to Rural Development.
- Professor Peter Cochrane. For services to Global Telecommunications.
- Martin Sean Coffey QFSM, Deputy Chief Fire Officer, London Fire and Civil Defence Authority. For services to the Fire Service.
- Windsor Coles, Lately HM Principal Electrical Inspector, Health and Safety Executive, Department of the Environment, Transport and the Regions.
- Sheila Kay Compton. For services to the Debra Stappard Trust.
- Thomas Stephen Corrigan. For services to the Charter Mark Award Scheme.
- William Cowell. For services to Health Care for People with a Learning Disability.
- Rowland Cowley, Ophthalmic Surgeon. For services to the Prevention of Eye Diseases in the Third World.
- Robert James Leslie Craig. For services to Agriculture and to the community.
- Christine Crathorne, Grade7, Department for Education and Employment.
- Ruth Eva Crawley. For services to Equal Opportunities in the Legal Profession.
- Professor David William Thomasson Crompton. For services to the Development of Health Care Services in West Africa.
- Garth Crooks. For services to the Institute of Professional Sport.
- Vernester Camilla Cyril, Midwife and Ward Manager, Royal Gwent Hospital. For services to Community Relations in South East Wales.
- Parag Chandra Das, Project Director, Bridge Management Quality Services (QS), Highways Agency.
- Morgyn Davies, Grade7, Ministry of Defence.
- Peter Anthony Davies, Director, Stage2 Trading Electricity Pool of England and Wales. For services to the Power Industry.
- Spencer Davies, Managing Director, Spencer Davies Engineering. For services to the New Deal in Wales.
- William Bryan Davies. For services to the Rhondda Health Care NHS Trust.
- Professor Peter Hobley Davison, Research Professor of English, De Montfort University. For services to Literature.
- David Thomson Deas. For services to the Construction Industry, especially the Chartered Institute of Building.
- John Dola, Head, Central Library, Birmingham City Council. For services to Librarianship and Information Provision.
- Alistair Donaldson, General Manager (Scotland), Meat and Livestock Commission. For services to the Meat and Livestock Industry.
- Stephen John Whittick Druitt, Managing Director, SIAS Ltd. For services to Improving Traffic Modelling.
- John Greenwell Dunbar. For services to Architectural History.
- James Durcan, Principal, Ruskin College Oxford. For services to Adult Education.
- Hugh Roger Dyas. For services to Sugar Beet Research and Development.
- John Brian Edwards, Grade6, Ministry of Defence.
- Walter Elliott JP. For services to Farming.
- Professor Roger Alfred Fairhurst Ellis. For services to Third Level Education.
- John Elstrop JP. For services to the Administration of Justice in Durham.
- Michael William James Etwell, Lately Executive Director, Production Eurostar (UK) Ltd. For services to the Rail Industry.
- Anthony Herbert Everington, General Medical Practitioner, London. For services to Inner City Primary Care.
- Charles Don Petrie Farquhar, Member, Dundee City Council. For services to Local Government and to the Community.
- Margaret Brigid Feore. For public service.
- Ian Keith Ferguson. For services to Palynology and Botany and to the Royal Botanic Gardens, Kew.
- Donald George Filleul. For services to the Cultural and Historical Heritage of Jersey.
- David John Harvey Fisher. For services to the NHS in Wales.
- Cedric Denis Ford. For charitable services to the University and City of Nottingham.
- John Barclay Forrest. Farmer. For services to UK Cereals Exports.
- George MacDonald Fraser, Author. For services to Literature.
- Anthony John Frith, Lately Head, Prison Catering Services, Prison Service, Home Office.
- Michael John Fuhr, Project Director, Channel Tunnel Rail Link, Department of the Environment, Transport and the Regions.
- Anne Alison Gee. For services to the British Red Cross Society in Dorset.
- Marilyn Elizabeth Gibbons, Lately Headteacher, Caia Park Nursery School, Wrexham. For services to Nursery Education.
- John Newton Gibbs, Head of Pathology, Forest Research, Forestry Commission.
- Simon Gibson, President and Chief Executive, Ubiquity Software Ltd. For services to Industry and to the community in South Wales.
- Professor Frederick James Gordon. For public service.
- Professor David John Green RAF (Rtd). For services to the Spitfire Society.
- Rosamund Lydia Griffin. For services to the Rothschild Collection, Waddesdon Manor.
- John Lloyd Hamilton, Director and Chairman, County Durham Training and Enterprise Council. For services to Industrial Training and Education Issues.
- Peter John Hammond, Lately Grade 7, Department of the Environment, Transport and the Regions.
- Dennis Harding. For charitable services in Derbyshire.
- Tom Grafton Hassall, Lately Secretary/Chief Executive, Royal Commission on the Historical Monuments of England.
- Antony Worraker Hayward. For services to the National Association of Local Councils.
- Beryl Minnie Hayward JP. For services to the Administration of Justice in Shropshire.
- John Charles Frederick Hayward, Registrar and Secretary, University of Durham and Provost, University of Durham Stockton Campus. For services to Higher Education Management.
- Professor Patsy Healey, Director, Centre For Research in European Urban Environments, Department of Town and Country Planning, University of Newcastle. For services to Planning.
- Walter John Herriot, Managing Director, St John's Innovation Centre Ltd., Cambridge. For services to Industry in East England.
- Peter James Hewitt, Lately Director, Community and Social Services, Salford City Council. For services to Social Services.
- Dietrich Adolf Hofmann, Director, Design Unit, University of Newcastle upon Tyne. For services to the Royal Navy.
- Sandra Horley, Chief Executive, Refuge. For services to the Protection of Women and Children suffering Domestic Violence.
- Valerie Georgina Howarth. For services to ChildLine.
- Enda Hughes, Constable, West Midlands Police. For services to Crime Reduction in Coventry.
- J. Quentin Hughes MC. For services to Architecture and Conservation in North West England.
- Judith Anne Hunt. Lately Chief Executive, Local Government Management Board. For services to Equal Opportunities.
- Brigadier Geoffrey William Hutton DL. For services to the Soldiers' Sailors' and Airmen's Families Association in Avon and Severnside.
- Elizabeth Margaret Innes JP. For services to the Administration of Justice in Leeds.
- Joan Millicent Jenkins BEM. For services to Women's Health Concern.
- John Robin Jenkins, Author. For services to Literature.
- Travis Lloyd Johnson. For services to Community Action and Support against Crime in Leeds.
- Brian George Jones. For services to Ballooning.
- Professor George William Jones. For services to the National Consumer Council.
- Neil Trevor Jones, Headteacher Ysgol Glanymor Comprehensive, Pwllheli. For services to Standards and Leadership in Education.
- Marjorie Keenan. For services to People with Learning Disabilities.
- Ronald Hugh Kemsley. For services to the Winged Fellowship Trust and to Disabled People.
- Naseem Fatima Khan. For services to Cultural Diversity.
- Rosemarie Khan. For services to Standards in Dental Hygiene.
- Ernest Townley Kinder JP, President, Bradford and District Association for Deaf People. For services to Disabled People and to the community in West Yorkshire.
- Norman James King, Chairman, WHO Pan-European Task Force on National Environmental Health Action Plans. For services to Environment and Health.
- Michael H. Kreuzer, Director, Technical and UK. For services to the Medical Systems Industry.
- Alan George Ladd, Lately Assistant Comptroller, National Investment and Loans Office.
- Bhupindar Kumar Lakhanpaul, Assistant Director, HM Board of Inland Revenue.
- Professor Frederick Last, Lately Member, Scottish Natural Heritage. For services to Environmental Science.
- Catherine Law (Mrs. Kennedy), Senior Research Fellow, MRC Environmental Epidemiology Unit, University of Southampton. For services to Public Health.
- Susanna Lucy Lawrence, General Medical Practitioner, Leeds. For services to Patient Care, especially for Drug Misusers.
- Robert Henry Layton, Lately Grade 6, Department of Social Security.
- Alan John Leaman. For political and public services.
- Roger Geoffrey Luxton, Principal Inspector, London Borough of Barking and Dagenham. For services to Education Standards.
- Valerie Maciver, Chairman, Highland Council Education Committee. For services to Education.
- Christopher Ian Mallender. For services to Unemployed People and to the New Deal in Rotherham, South Yorkshire.
- Jean Mary Mars,. Chairman, Shropshire County Council. For services to Local Government and to the community.
- Ernest Harold Marshall. For services to the St John Ambulance Brigade in Essex.
- Angela Mason, Executive Director, Stonewall. For services to Homosexual rights.
- Professor Adam Clark McBride. For services to the Understanding of Mathematics in Schools.
- John Alphonsus McCartney. For public service.
- Liam Gerard McKenna, Founder and Executive Director, R. Frazier Ltd. For services to the Computer Industry and to the Environment.
- William McNamara, Managing Director, Oakwood Leisure Park, Pembrokeshire. For services to Tourism in Wales.
- Michael Edward Lovelace Melluish, Treasurer, Marylebone Cricket Club. For services to Cricket.
- Professor John Miles, Ecological Adviser to the Secretary of State for Scotland, Scottish Office.
- Keith C. Miles. For services to Anglo-Slovenian Relations.
- Colin Millbanks, Chief Executive, Mayne Nickless Express, North America and Europe. For services to the Variety Club.
- David Robert Moorcroft MBE. For services to Athletics.
- Walter Moorcroft, Potter. For services to the Ceramic Industry in Britain.
- Anne Winifred Morgan. For services to the National Association of Citizens Advice Bureaux Wales.
- Arthur MacGregor Morris. Consultant Plastic Surgeon, Tayside University Hospitals NHS Trust. For services to Plastic Surgery and to the BMA.
- Richard Sidney Morris. Lately Managing Director, CPRC. For services to Export and to Credit Insurance.
- Patricia Morrison, Technical Adviser, HM Board of Inland Revenue.
- Cerri Martin Morse, Headteacher, Penrhys Junior School, Rhondda Cynon Taff. For services to Education.
- Leonard Arthur Moss. For services to the community on Guernsey.
- Allan MacKinnon Mowatt, Chairman, South Eastern Branch of the Institution of Highways and Transportation. For services to Highways and Transportation.
- Professor James Lothian Murray, Director of Business Development, Scottish Design Ltd. For services to Business Development.
- Jennifer Susan Murray (Jennifer Susan Forgham-Bailey), Presenter, Woman's Hour. For services to Radio Broadcasting.
- William George Myers, Joint Chairman, Health and Safety Executive/Local Authority Enforcement Liaison Committee. For services to Health and Safety.
- Michael Bernard New. For services to Aquaculture in Developing Countries.
- Gillian Nott, Lately Chief Executive, ProShare. For services to Financial Education.
- Frederick Joseph Oman, Project Manager, HMS Ocean, GEC Marine. For services to the Shipbuilding Industry.
- David Owen, Executive Director, Share the Vision. For services to Librarianship and Information Provision.
- Brian Sidney Pack, Chief Executive, ANM Group Ltd. For services to the Agriculture, Food and Marketing Industries in Scotland.
- Alan Albert Parrish, Nurse Adviser in Learning Disabilities, Royal College of Nursing. For services to Nursing.
- Nicholas Wyndham Partridge, Chief Executive, Terrence Higgins Trust. For services to people affected by HIV/AIDS.
- Elizabeth Louise Passmore, Head, School Improvement Division, Office for Standards in Education.
- Kamlesh Kumar Patel. For services to Health Issues within Ethnic minority communities.
- Professor William Edgar Paterson, Director, Institute for German Studies, University of Birmingham. For services to German Scholarship.
- Brian Kenneth Peppiatt. For services to Save the Children.
- Graham Keith Perolls. For services to the Ellenor Foundation.
- John Charles Perry, Assistant Director, Consumer Affairs Directorate, Department of Trade and Industry.
- Patricia Ann Petch JP, Chair, National Governors Council. For services to Education.
- Professor David Phillips, Head, Department of Chemistry, Imperial College of Science, Technology and Medicine. For services to Science Education.
- Margaret Pieters, Constable, Metropolitan Police. For services to the Police.
- Stella Pirie, Chairman, WESTEC. For services to Training and Enterprise in the former County of Avon.
- Dilys Plant (Mrs. Taylor), Lately Grade 5, Office of Water Services.
- Professor Nigel John Poole, External and Regulatory Affairs Manager, Zeneca Plant Science. For services to the Biotechnology Industry.
- Katrine Elisabeth Prince. For services to professional Tourist Guiding.
- Colonel Brian Ernest Maitland Prophet TD DL. For services to the Soldiers' Sailors' and Airmen's Families Association in Bedfordshire.
- Dennis Wyndham Puddle BEM. For services to Local Government and to the community in Blaenavon, South Wales.
- Elizabeth Mary Purves, Writer and Broadcaster. For services to Journalism.
- Robert Purves, Lately Director of Operations, Nursing and Quality, Royal Infirmary of Edinburgh NHS Trust. For services to Health Care.
- Ruth Mary Rattenbury, Lately Head of Exhibitions, Tate Gallery. For services to Visual Arts.
- Elsbeth Rea. For services to the Police.
- The Reverend John Patrick Reardon, General Secretary, The Council for Churches of Britain and Ireland. For services to Ecumenicalism.
- John Mackay Reid, Chartered Patent Agent. For services to the Patent Profession.
- Janice Kay Richards MBE, Assistant Private Secretary to the Prime Minister.
- James Richardson QPM, Lately Deputy Chief Constable, Strathclyde Police. For services to the Police.
- Ann Clare Riches (Mrs. Coltman). For services to the Preservation of Buildings.
- Rosamund Rigby, Co-Director, Folkworks. For services to Traditional Music and to the Arts in the North of England.
- Ann Margaret Risman, Principal, Richmond Adult and Community College, Surrey. For services to Further Education.
- William Malcolm Ritchie, Lately Chairman, North Ayrshire and Arran NHS Trust. For services to Health Care.
- Philip Bradbury Robinson, Lately Chairman, Business Link North Derbyshire. For services to Industry and Commerce.
- John William Rosenthal, Lately Chief Executive Officer, GKN Defence. For services to the Defence Industry.
- William George Row, Director Technical Services, Corporation of London. For services to the City of London.
- Usha Sahni, Headteacher, Argyle Primary School, Kings Cross, London. For services to Education.
- Michaela Sarah Sheila Saunders, Headteacher, Shaw Park Primary School, Hull. For services to Education.
- Richard Peter Scott, Grade6, Ministry of Defence.
- Peter Charles Shiells, Divisional Director. Bachy Soletanche Ltd. For services to the Construction Industry.
- Margaret Mary Smart, Director, Catholic Education Service. For services to Education.
- Audrey Smith, Member, Inland Waterways Amenity Advisory Committee. For services to the Inland Waterways Association.
- Colin Smith, Chief Executive. Oldham Metropolitan Borough Council. For services to the Regeneration of Oldham, Lancashire.
- Douglas Percy Smith. For services to the Royal British Legion.
- Robert James Smith, Grade6, HM Land Registry, Lord Chancellor's Department.
- Ian Sparks. For services to the Children's Society.
- Derek James Spratling, Team Leader, Valuation Office Agency, HM Board of Inland Revenue.
- Beryl Steele, Lately Director, Thames Reach. For services to Homeless People.
- Professor Christopher David Stephens, Head, Division of Child Dental Health, University of Bristol. For services to the use of IT in the Dental Profession and to Education.
- Edward Allen Stevens JP. For services to the Administration of Justice in Dorset.
- Patricia Lesley Stewart, Headteacher, Clatterbridge School, Wirral. For services to Special Needs Education.
- Aidan Bertram Gordon Stokes, Principal, North Warwickshire and Hinckley College. For services to Education Policy.
- Norman Kelvin Stoller MBE DL, President, Seton Scholl Group plc. For services to the Business Community in Manchester.
- Christopher Harry Stratton, Chairman, Forestry Commission's Regional Advisory Committee for the Midlands and East England. For services to Forestry.
- Peter Thomas Swan. For services to the Sea Cadets Association.
- Thomas Macklyn Swan, Chairman and Managing Director, Thomas Swan and Company. For services to the Chemical Industry.
- Andrew Dawson Taylor, Director and Head, ISIS Facility, Rutherford Appleton Laboratory. For services to Neutron Scattering.
- Valerie Margaret Taylor, Manager Information Services, Export Credit Guarantee Department, Department of Trade and Industry.
- Therese Mary Teasdale, Director of Personnel, Finance and Services, Thames Valley Police. For services to the Police.
- William John Thomson, President, ASIA-Clyde Blowers plc. For services to Export.
- Trever Richard Thurgate, Lately Grade6, Ministry of Defence.
- William Trant. For services to Community Relations.
- Shirley Jean Trundle, Grade5, Childcare Unit, Department for Education and Employment.
- John Michael Leal Uren. For services to the Royal London Society For the Blind.
- Michael William Vann, Assistant Director, HM Board of Inland Revenue.
- Diana Jane Vass, Head of Publications, NHS Estates Department of Health.
- Major Philip George Verdin MC DL. For services to the Royal British Legion and to Agriculture in Herefordshire.
- Julia Mary Walters, Actress. For services to Drama.
- Kenneth Alan Watling, Head, Efficiency and Private Finance Unit, HM Board of Customs and Excise.
- Eric Laurence Watts, Lately County Youth and Community Officer, Kent. For services to Young People.
- John Webber, Lately Grade7, Ministry of Defence.
- Colin Williams, Director of Carers Support, the Princess Royal Trust for Carers. For services to Carers and to the Voluntary Sector.
- Hector Alexander Williamson, Regional Director of Sales, Royal Mint.
- Professor Ian Wilmut, Project Leader, Roslin Institute, Edinburgh. For services to Embryo Development.
- John Robert Wilson, Director General, British Apparel and Textile Confederation. For services to the Clothing and Textiles Industry.
- Jeremy Michael Wooding, Managing Director, International Marketing and Sales, British Aerospace. For services to the Aviation Industry.
- Arthur Ernest John Youngs, Lately Grade7, Ministry of Defence.

==== Member (MBE) ====
- Jean Rosemary Adams (Mrs. Baker). For services to the Easdale Island Folk Museum, Argyll.
- Tony Adams. For services to Association Football.
- Joan Delano Aiken (Mrs. Goldstein). Author. For services to Children's Literature.
- Nina Rose Alcock. For services to Education in Suffolk.
- James MacMillan Anderson. For services to Organic Farming.
- John Lothian Anderson. Lately Senior Agricultural Economist, Scottish Agricultural College. For services to Agriculture.
- Douglas Arthur Anson. Postman. For services to the Royal Mail and to the community in Marlow, Buckinghamshire.
- Charles Marcus Arman. For services to the Thaxted Society and to Conservation.
- Dorothy May Bagnall. For services to the community in Whitley Bay, Tyne and Wear.
- Mavis Fraser Bain. For services to Educational Examinations in Scotland.
- Cherry Baker. For services to the Risborough Community Association, Buckinghamshire.
- Kenny Baker. For services to Jazz Music.
- Terence William Baker. For services to the Disabled Drivers' Association in Swansea.
- Cathy Bakewell. For political and public services.
- Thomas Longstaff Balmer. Farmworker. For services to Traditional Farming Skills and Methods.
- Patricia Ann Banks. Clerical Support Team Leader, HM Board of Inland Revenue.
- James Barber. For services to the St. Andrew's Ambulance Service.
- Christine Barnes. Revenue Officer, HM Board of Inland Revenue.
- Peter R. O. Barnett. For services to the Secretary of State for Scotland's Fisheries Committee.
- Hoyland Barrack. For services to the Royal British Legion in Boston, Lincolnshire.
- Dorothy Francis Bartholomew. For services to Christian Aid in Norwich, Norfolk.
- Marie-Noelle Barton. For services to the Engineering Council's Women into Science and Engineering Campaign.
- Brian Beacom. Lately Convener, Greater Glasgow Health Council. For services to Health and to the Community.
- Betty Beale. For charitable services to the community through Music in Rotherham, South Yorkshire.
- Joan Margaret Elizabeth Beck. For services to the community in Holmfirth, Huddersfield.
- Audrey Amelia Mary Beeches. For services to the South Reach Youth Club, Erith, Kent.
- George Douglas Bell. For services to the University of Paisley and to the community.
- Terrance Robert Benson. Ancillary Heavy Cleaner, GEC Marine. For services to the Defence Industry.
- Jack Berry. For services to the community in Chipping, Lancashire.
- Brian William Bevan. Superintendent Coxswain, Humber Lifeboat Station. For services to Maritime Safety.
- James Birnie. For services to Working Conditions in the Construction Industry.
- Edward James Bishop. Constable, Gwent Constabulary. For services to Young People in Newport.
- Susan Black. For services to the community in Troutbeck, Cumbria.
- Barbara Mary Vyvyan Blackburn. For services to the Board of Visitors, HM Prison Risley.
- Hilda Ruvena Blackburn. For services to the WRVS at Ninewells Hospital, Dundee.
- Timothy John Blackmore. For services to Independent Radio Production.
- Thomas Blain. Senior Traffic Warden, Dumfries and Galloway Constabulary. For services to the community.
- Tom Bloxham. For services to Architecture and Urban Regeneration in Liverpool and Manchester.
- McGregor Blyth. Higher Executive Officer, Office of Fair Trading.
- John Boddington. Principal Prison Officer, Prison Service, Home Office.
- Christine Anne Bond. For services to Broxtowe Estate Enterprises, Nottingham.
- Olive Gwendoline Bowes. For services to the Royal Lifesaving Society UK.
- John Albert Bowker. Chairman, Isle of Wight Council. For services to the community on the Isle of Wight.
- Anne Catherine Bowles. For services to the Newton Heath Youth and Community Association, Manchester.
- Elsie Bowyer. For humanitarian services in Bosnia.
- Doris Vera Boyd. Volunteer, St. Botolph's Project. For services to Homeless People in London.
- June Sylvia Brady. Lately Support Manager, Ministry of Agriculture, Fisheries and Food.
- David Brannan. For services to Young People in Rymney, South Wales.
- Patrick Cecil Bridges. For services to the Magistrates' Court and to the community in Bath and Wansdyke.
- Janette Brittin. For services to Women's Cricket.
- Iris Shirley Broadbent. For services to the community in the West Midlands.
- Ivy Victoria Broadbent. For services to Road Safety in Lytham St. Annes, Lancashire.
- Clare Elizabeth Brockbank. For services to the Armitt Library, Ambleside, Cumbria.
- John Stanley Brooks. For services to 75 Squadron (NZ) Association.
- Anne-Marie Brown. Support Manager, Ministry of Agriculture, Fisheries and Food
- Anthony Valentine Brown. Air Traffic Control Officer. For services to Aviation.
- Elizabeth Margaret Paterson-Brown. For services to Curling.
- Enid May Brown. For services to the 3H Fund and to Disabled People.
- Pamela Ada Brown. For services to the Friends of the Merseyside Maritime Museum.
- Ruth Brown. Ward Manager, York District Hospital. For services to Nursing.
- Stuart Charles Brown. Lead Pensions Administrator, NHS Pensions Agency, Department of Health.
- Mervyn Hervey Knox-Browne JP. For services to Conservation and to the community in Perthshire.
- Anna Cook Mair-McColl Bruce. Executive Officer, Benefits Agency, Department of Social Security.
- Michael Nevett Buckingham. Volunteer, Crisis. For services to Homeless People.
- John Buckle. Lieutenant, 146th London Boys' Brigade Company, Notting Hill. For services to the Boys' Brigade.
- Christine Mary Buckton. Education Consultant. For services to Family Literacy.
- Ivy Mary Burdett. Footwear Perforator, Alfred Sargent and Sons Ltd. For services to the Footwear Industry.
- Joan Burgess. For services to Mentally and Physically Handicapped People in Buckinghamshire.
- Sarah Elizabeth Burnett. For services to the Chamber of Commerce and Industry Movement.
- William Burns. For services to Primary Education and to the Arts.
- Leslie Busby. For services to the Police.
- Roland Walter Buss. Safety Consultant and Vice-Chairman, National Health and Safety Groups Council. For services to Health and Safety at Work.
- Geoffrey Malcolm Byham. Chief Engineer (Vehicles), GKN Westland Helicopters. For services to Helicopter Blade Development.
- George Sutherland Caithness. For services to the community in St Andrews, Fife.
- Dorothy Joan Calder. For services to the community, especially Health Care in Cambridgeshire.
- Elizabeth Marjorie Calvert. Lately School Crossing Patrol. For services to Road Safety in North Yorkshire.
- Derek MacPherson Cameron. Proprietor, Dominion Cinema, Edinburgh. For services to the Entertainment Industry.
- Anthony John Camp. For services to the Society of Genealogists.
- The Honourable Jennet Campbell. For services to Education and to Music in Cornwall.
- William Campbell. Plant and Transport Manager, Esso Exploration and Production UK Ltd. For services to the Oil Industry.
- Eva Cathleen Carter. For services to the Boys' Brigade and to the community in Brighton, East Sussex.
- Teresa Anne Carthew. For services to the Avon and Somerset Constabulary.
- Howard Chadwick. Managing Director, Claro Precision Engineering Ltd. For services to Industry and Small Businesses in North Yorkshire.
- Lasburn Chambers. For services to the Greater Manchester Probation Service and Community Relations.
- Margaret Rose Chapman. Member, East Riding of Yorkshire Council. For services to the community in Bridlington
- Annette Margaret Checksfield. Higher Executive Officer, Prison Service, Home Office
- Judith Ann Cherry. Director, Korea Business Services. For services to Export to Korea.
- Andrew Chester. Voluntary Observer, Meteorological Office Nottinghamshire.
- James Andrews Cheyne. Executive Officer, Department of Social Security.
- Faizur Rahman Choudhury. For services to Community Relations in Birmingham.
- Elizabeth Clark. Lately School Crossing Patrol, Annette Street Primary School, Glasgow. For services to Road Safety.
- Peter Hewitt Peterson Clark. Coxswain Mechanic, Lerwick Lifeboat. For services to the RNLI.
- Colonel Henry Leslie Clarke TD. For services to the community, especially Young People in Ealing.
- Rose Clayton. Nursery Leader, Tartan Tots Day Nursery, Royal Cornhill Hospital, Aberdeen. For services to Nursery Education.
- George Alborough Cockman. For services to the community, especially Education in Steyning, West Sussex.
- Sheila Coggrave. For services to the Samaritans Prison Support.
- Margaret McCubbin Cole. For services to the community, especially Stanmore Primary School in Hampshire.
- Margaret Collins. Site Manager, Princess of Wales Hospital, Bridgend. For services to the NHS.
- Freda Compton (Mrs. Lucas). For services to the community in Hartlepool, Cleveland.
- Undine Concannon. For services to the London Planetarium.
- Stephen Leslie Connock. Chairman and Chief Executive, Institute of Customer Service. For services to Human Resource Management.
- Barbara Mary Connolly. For services to the Liverpool College Choral (Choir) Society.
- Seamus Connolly. For services to Industry.
- Ivan James Constance. Lately Senior Captain, ARC Manne Ltd. For services to the Marine Dredging Industry.
- Laurence Douglas Cook. For services to the Royal Naval Association and to Young People in Letchworth, Hertfordshire.
- Sheila Maureen Cooper. Lately Welfare Director. For services to the Motor and Allied Trades Benevolent Fund.
- Maureen Cope. For services to the Ardenglen Housing Association.
- Robert Jerome Corran. Coxswain, Douglas Lifeboat. For services to the RNLI on the Isle of Man.
- Robert Charles Cotton. For services to the Preservation of Churches.
- Peter Courtier. Director, Bristol Racial Equality Council. For services to the community.
- Kathleen Cowap. For services to the community, especially First Aid in Swansea.
- Anne Louise Cowie. For services to the Citizens Advice Bureau and the community in Saltash, Cornwall.
- John Andrew Cox. For services to the Soldiers' Sailors' and Airmen's Families Association in Cheshire.
- ~~Michael Joseph Eugene Cox. For services to the community in Welwyn Garden City, Hertfordshire.~~
- Dinah Coyne. For services to the Campden Voluntary Help Group in Chipping Campden, Gloucestershire.
- David Darcy Cozens. For services to the Huntingdonshire Local History Society.
- Michael Crabb. For services to Music in Southend on Sea, Essex.
- Edmund Bootes Cranmer. For services to the community in Denton, Manchester.
- Maurice Crathorne. Member, Durham City Council and Coxhoe Parish Council. For services to Local Government and to the community in Coxhoe.
- Douglas Andrew Cribb. For services to the Citizens Advice Bureau in Bordon, Hampshire.
- Clifford Charles Croft. For services to Disabled People in Neath and Port Talbot.
- James Crozier. For services to the Fire Service.
- Rita Culwick. Lately Senior Personal Secretary, Department of Health.
- Gillian Curtis. For services to Disabled People on Jersey.
- Margaret Mary Curtis JP. For services to the Citizens Advice Bureau in Chelmsley Wood, West Midlands.
- Janet Margaret Dalglish. For services to Children's Play Schemes.
- Albert Davidson. For services to the Alnwick Talking Newspaper in Northumberland.
- Basil John Davidson. For public service.
- The Reverend Canon Norman William Dawson. For services to RELATE in Greater Manchester.
- Cyril Clive Beynon Day. For services to the Development of Education and Technical Provision in South East Wales.
- Darron Day. Milkman. For services to the communities of Ightham and Borough Green, Kent.
- Peter Dean. For services to Photographic Journalism in Lincolnshire.
- Joyce Sylvia Deering. Personal Secretary, Ministry of Defence.
- Douglas John Dennis. Chairman, Guidance Enterprises Group. For services to Education in North Yorkshire.
- Jane Dickinson. Senior Personal Secretary, Department for Education and Employment.
- Sylvia Helen Louise Dingley. Lately Administrative Assistant, Department of Social Security.
- Derina Tanya Dinkin. For services to the community in Surrey.
- John Doak. Farm Manager, Balig Farm, Ayrshire. For services to Agriculture.
- Dorothy Ann Dobson. Assistant Director, Department of Physical Education, University of Dundee. For services to Physical Education, particularly for Elderly People.
- Eric Hopper Dodds. For services to the community in King's Lynn, Norfolk.
- Major Gordon Ronald Dodds. For services to the Ex-Services Mental Welfare Society.
- Gerard Patrick Antony Dolan. General Medical Practitioner, Paisley. For services to Medicine.
- Sharatchandra Anant Dongre. Lately Higher Executive Officer, Department for Education and Employment.
- Joseph Patrick Dornan. For public service.
- Alfred Thomas Dove. Lately Member, Basildon District Council. For services to Local Government in Basildon, Essex.
- Ian Malcolm Dowell. Editor, Birmingham Evening Mail. For services to the Newspaper Industry.
- Mary Elisabeth Christina Doyle, Administrative Officer, Ministry of Defence.
- Eileen Drayne. For charitable services to the community.
- Clarence Drew. For political and public services.
- John Beaumont Drinkwater. Member, Harbury Parish Council. For services to the community in Harbury, Warwickshire.
- John Henry Drury. For services to the community in Binbrook, Lincolnshire.
- Josephine Dugdale JP. For services to the Citizens Advice Bureau in Stevenage, Hertfordshire.
- Elizabeth Johnston Wilson Dunlop. For services to the community in Wittering, Cambridgeshire.
- Gillian Margaret Durrant. For services to the WRVS in Norfolk.
- Robert Fitzgerald Earle. For services to Association Football.
- James Shan Edmiston. For services to the community in Kinghorn, Fife.
- Joyce Edwards. For services to the community through Music in Abertillery, South Wales.
- Rose Elliot. For services to Vegetarian Cooking.
- John Charles Kennedy Elliott. For services to the NSPCC in Manchester.
- Roderick Elliott. Duty Station Manager, Northern Line, London Underground. For services to London Transport.
- William Frederick Edmond Elliott. For services to the community, especially Young People's Sport, in East Ham London.
- Annie England. School Nurse, Wigan Leigh Area Health Service Trust. For services to Health Care.
- Kay Kathleen Ethel Ennals. For services to the WRVS in Dorset.
- Audrey Trevor-Evans. For services to the community, especially the provision of Health Care in Barnet, London.
- Beryl Evans. Vice President, Gloucestershire Council for Voluntary Youth Services. For services to Young People.
- Diana Grace Evans. Lately Warden, King George VI Memorial Hostel Capel-Y-Ffin. For services to Young People and to the community.
- Glenys Margaret Evans. Personal Secretary, Ministry of Defence.
- Patricia Margaret Evans. For services to Berkshire Family Mediation.
- Lynn Every. Typist, Lord Chancellor's Department.
- The Honourable Elizabeth Fairbairn. Chairman, Lothian Housing Association. For services to Housing.
- Peter Richard Fay. Senior Trades Officer, Prison Service, Home Office.
- Winifred Finch Feaver. For services to Tennis in Yorkshire.
- Margaret Rose Linda Fellows. Typist, Crown Prosecution Service.
- Susan Fennell. For services to the British Red Cross Society in Hertfordshire.
- Forbes Ferguson. Lately Retained Sub-Officer, Strathclyde Fire Brigade. For services to the Fire Service.
- Sheila Elizabeth Ferres. For services to Physiotherapy in Banchory, Kincardineshire.
- Robert Field. Lately Senior Professional and Technology Officer, Driver Vehicle and Licensing Agency, Department of the Environment, Transport and the Regions.
- Judith Campbell Figgures. For services to Sailing for People with Disabilities.
- Margaret Yvonne Firth. For services to the London North War Pensions Committee.
- John Boyd Fisher. Principal, Fisher Associates. For services to Education and Training in the Construction Industry.
- William George Fisher. Signaller, Railtrack. For services to the Railway Community in the Cotswolds.
- Mary Bernadette Fitzgerald. C2, Cabinet Office.
- William Dennis Frederick Foden. For services to the Stafford League of Hospital Friends and to Mental Health Care.
- Ronald Foster. For services to Countryside Conservation on the North Yorkshire Moors.
- Nicholas Martin Fox. Senior Professional and Technology Officer, Ministry of Defence.
- Peter John Fox. For services to the community in Redbourn, Hertfordshire.
- Charles Frederick Frampton. School Crossing Patrol. For services to Road Safety and the community in Titchfield, Hampshire.
- Victor Edward Percy Frampton. Senior Scientific Officer, Ministry of Defence.
- Helga Maud Tonynbee Frankland. Vice-President Cumbria Wildlife Trust. For Services to Nature Conservation in Cumbria.
- Sarah Jane Frapple. For political and public services.
- Christopher Edward Berkeley Friend. For services to Sight Savers International.
- Alfred Fullman. For services to the Salvation Army in Port Talbot.
- Raymond Gainer. For charitable services in Wigan.
- Daphne Gammon. For services to the community, especially Young People, in Harting, West Sussex.
- Charles Henry Ronald Garner. For services to the Master Tailors' Benevolent Association and Tailors' Benevolent Institution.
- Beryl June Garrett. For services to the British Red Cross Society in Bedfordshire.
- Anthony Douglas Gay. Deputy Principal, Kidderminster College, Worcestershire. For services to Further Education.
- Christina May Gee. Lately Curator, Keats' House, Hampstead. For services to Literary Scholarship.
- Ursula Margaret Gent. For services to the community in Portsmouth, Hampshire.
- Irene Gillies. District Nurse, Brechin Health Centre, Angus NHS Trust. For services to Health Care.
- Raymond Hugh Gladden. For services to the community, especially through the Rotary Club in Crewe, Cheshire.
- William Gleave. Managing Director, Northern Textiles plc. For services to Employment Creation in Lancashire.
- Richard Jeremy Glover. Youth Leader, Bolton Lads and Girls Club. For services to Young People.
- William Goddard. For services to the community in Whiteleas, Tyne and Wear.
- Reginald Peter Gordon. For services to the community, especially St Oswald's Hospice, in Newcastle upon Tyne.
- Murray Gowan. For services to the community in Cornwall.
- Beryl June Gower. Court Manager, Lord Chancellor's Department.
- Muriel Eirwen Gowing. Typist, Valuation Office Agency, HM Board of Inland Revenue.
- Malcolm John Graham. For services to the community in Back, Isle of Lewis.
- Kathleen Maude Gratland. For services to the community in Neath, South Wales.
- Alan Gregory. Senior Executive Officer, Department of Social Security.
- James Mundie Greig. For services to War Disabled in Aberdeenshire.
- Christopher Beaufort Grimaldi. Youth Worker, Southmead, Bristol. For services to Young People.
- Flora May Grindley. For services to the community, especially Ringmer Link, in Ringmer, East Sussex.
- William Albert Gulliver. For services to the community in Reading, Berkshire.
- Graham David Gwilliam. For services to the community in Barry, South Wales.
- Mollie Haikings. For services to the community in Houghton-le-Spring, Tyne and Wear.
- Florence Hall. For services to the WRVS in County Durham.
- Phyllis Hall. For services to the St John Ambulance Brigade in North Yorkshire.
- Joan Alexandrina Hamann. Administrative Officer, Procurator Fiscal's Office, Lochmaddy.
- Phyllis Hampton. For services to the community in Deeside, Flintshire.
- Keith Albert Hancox. Lately Telephonist. For services to Barclays Bank.
- Stephen Philip Hardy. Member, Ibstock Community Enterprise Ltd. For services to the Regeneration of Ibstock, Leicestershire.
- Anthony Martin Harris. Senior Fire Control Operator, Bedfordshire and Luton Fire and Rescue Service. For services to the Fire Service.
- David Fletcher Harrison. Group Customer Services Manager, HM Board of Inland Revenue.
- Carol Hart (Mrs. Houghton), TB Clinical Nurse Specialist, Kingston and Richmond, Surrey. For services to Health Care.
- Alfred Thomas William Harvey. Trustee, Leopold Muller Estate. For services to Charity.
- The Reverend John Wilfred Harvey. Woodworker. For services to Truro Cathedral, Cornwall.
- Mahmud Hasan. For services to Community Relations in London.
- William John Haxby. Environment Protection Officer, Environment Agency. For services to Environmental Protection and the communities in Filey and Scarborough.
- Thomas Vivian Hay. For services to Local Government and to the community in Pembroke Dock, West Wales.
- Geoffrey Sidney William Hayhoe. For services to the RAF Benevolent Fund.
- Robert David Heap. President, Institute of Refrigeration. For services to the Refrigeration Industry.
- Sarah Winifred Joy Hill. For services to the Cardiac Care Association.
- Peter Hitchmough JP. Sub Officer, Merseyside Fire Brigade. For services to the community in Merseyside.
- Martin Neil Hodson. For services to the community in Caerphilly.
- Lucienne Holt. Dog Carer, Greater Manchester Police. For services to Animal Welfare.
- Mary Ann Hoole. For services to the community in Wroot, North Lincolnshire.
- Roy Hopkins. Lately Chief Steward I, Royal Logistics Corps, Ministry of Defence.
- The Reverend Brian Howell. For services to the community in the Teams area of Gateshead, Tyne and Wear.
- Kate Louise Howey. For services to Judo.
- Ian Alan Hoy. Gun Fitter, Ministry of Defence.
- Christopher John Hughes. Professional and Technology Officer, Ministry of Defence.
- Jill Mary Hughes. Executive Officer, Benefits Agency, Department of Social Security.
- Leroy Billy Hughes. For services to Youth Sport in Manchester.
- Barbara Hull. For services to MIND in Kettering, Northamptonshire.
- Bessie Humphreys. For services to the community in Glasgow.
- Harold Joseph Hunter. For services to the Police.
- Lilian Marguarite Hutchison. For services to Elderly People in Dunfermline, Fife.
- Daniel McGregor Ince. For services to Young People and the community in East London.
- Fred Innes. For services to the community in Winlaton, Tyne and Wear.
- Wilham Fraser Ireland. Senior Executive Officer, Ministry of Defence.
- Bert Isaac. For services to Art Education in Wales.
- Vera Ivers. For services to Elderly People in Staffordshire.
- Janet Evelyn Jacklin. For services to Mentally Ill People in Colchester, Essex.
- Ahmed Abdi Jama. Assistant Director Facilities, Preston Acute Hospitals NHS Trust. For services to the NHS.
- Andrew James. For services to Tourism in Nottingham.
- Auriel Irene James. For services to Charity Search.
- Edmund David Ninian James. For charitable services in Newport, South Wales.
- Ann Jameson JP. For charitable services to the community in Middleton, Greater Manchester.
- Howard Philip Maxim Jeffrey. Mentor Programme Co-ordinator, City and Islington College, London. For services to the Mentor Programme and to Further Education.
- Ann Vicki Johnson. For services to the Probation Service in Cheltenham.
- Anne Faith Johnson. Assistant Establishment Officer, House of Lords.
- Derek Joseph Johnson, Patrol, The Automobile Association. For services to Motorists.
- Harold Keith Johnson, Company Secretary, Derby Community Transport. For services to Transport in Derby.
- Alan Reginald Walter Jones JP. For services in the community, especially Sport, in Preston, Lancashire.
- Dorothy Jones. For services to Music in Stockton-on-Tees, Cleveland.
- Eluned Jones. For services to the community, particularly Physically Handicapped People, in Nefyn and District, Gwynedd.
- Elwyn Owen Jones. For services to the Soldiers', Sailors' and Airmen's Families Association in Clwyd.
- Jemima Parry-Jones. Director, the National Birds of Prey Centre, Newent, Gloucestershire. For services to Bird Conservation.
- John Hamar Jones. For services to the Landing Craft Gun and Flak Association.
- Vincent Jones. Senior Instructional Officer, Ministry of Defence.
- Richard Henry James Joy. For services to the community in Landkey, North Devon.
- Surinder Kaur. Training Manager, HM Board of Customs and Excise.
- Robert Howard Kay. For services to the Architectural Profession.
- Andrew Hedges Keachie. Musical Director, Kilmarnock Concert Brass. For services to Brass Band Music in Ayrshire.
- Gillian Carol Frances Keating. Lately Private Secretary to the Bishop of Rochester. For services to the Church of England.
- Arlene Kee. For services to Youth Work.
- Arthur Kemp JP. For services to the community, especially the Boys Brigade, in Nottingham.
- Derek George Kemp. For services to the community in Horsham, West Sussex.
- John Kendall. For services to the community, especially People with Learning Disabilities, in Christchurch, Dorset.
- Ann Patricia Kent. For charitable services in the community in Horsham, West Sussex.
- Nansi Rita Kent, Clinical Nurse Specialist, Swansea. For services to the Care of Diabetics
- Stephen Frederick Killick, Senior Movement Area Officer, Airside Operations, Heathrow, BAA. For services to Aviation.
- Robert Julian Kindred. For services to the Institute of Historic Building Conservation.
- Audrey King. For services to the community in Penwortham, Lancashire.
- Kanya King. For services to the Music Industry.
- Patricia Mary Kirby. Complaints Manager, NHS Executive Department of Health.
- John Gordon William Kirk. Head of Environmental Health, Warwick District Council. For services to Community Health.
- Sylvia Kathleen Knowles. Administrative Assistant, Ministry of Defence.
- Judith Kusel. Grade B, Department for Culture, Media and Sport.
- Sylvia Langridge. For services to the Inner London Probation Service.
- Judith Lansdell. For services to the Shepway Victim Support Scheme.
- George Bernard Lawrence. For services to the Agricultural Community and to Young People in Cheshire.
- Joan Barrie Lawrence. For services to Ladies' Amateur Golf.
- May Fulton Thomson Lawson. Lately Directorate Secretary, Royal Alexandra Hospital NHS Trust. For services to the NHS.
- Captain Ronald Leask. Lately Captain MV Gardyloo . For services to Public Sanitation.
- Barbara Mary Lee. For services to the Friends of Cookridge Hospital, Leeds.
- Rosemary Renee Leigh. For services to the WRVS in Lancashire.
- Charles Lemon. For services to the Bronte Society.
- Angela Isabella Agnes Lennox. General Medical Practitioner, Leicester. For services to Medicine and to the community.
- Cynthia Kathleen Emily Leonard. For services to the community in Solihull, West Midlands.
- James Edward Letch. Lately Senior Information Officer/Chief Engineer, Central Office of Information.
- Rose Elizabeth Lever. For services to Out of School Childcare in Royton, Lancashire.
- John Lewis. Higher Executive Officer, Home Office.
- Ursil Lewis. Foster Carer, London. For services to Fostering.
- Heinrich Fritz Heinz Liebrecht. For services to the Arts in Norfolk.
- Edward Colin Livingston JP. For services to the Jewish community in Middlesex.
- George Fredrick Livingstone QGM. For services to the Police.
- Helen Livingstone. Chairman, Glenochil Young Offenders' Institution Visiting Committee. For services to Prisoners' Welfare.
- William Frederick Login. For services to the community, especially Disabled People in Holbeach and Spalding, Lincolnshire.
- Anthony Peter Long. For services to the Thamesdown and District Scope Association.
- Jillian Longson. For services to the community, especially the Girls' Brigade in Gawsworth, Cheshire.
- Irene Loughran. Revenue Assistant, HM Board of Inland Revenue.
- Audrey May Lovell. For services to the community in Melchbourne, Bedfordshire.
- Roy Gordon Lowe. Bus Driver, Stagecoach East Midland. For services to the Bus Industry and to the community.
- Yvonne Lydon. Personal Assistant to the Chief Fire Officer, Tyne and Wear Metropolitan Fire Brigade. For services to the Fire Service.
- Roderick Lynch. Support Grade1, Home Office.
- John Roland Machin. Senior Teacher, Heathfield High School, Congleton. For services to Careers Education.
- John Stuart Mackie. Lately Chairman, Stockton City Challenge Partnership Board. For services to the Regeneration of Stockton.
- John Irvine Macleod. Lately Office Manager, Scottish Office.
- John Bennett MacNair. For services to the community in North Berwick, East Lothian.
- George Makey. For services to Disabled Children through Golf Masters Anonymous.
- Rabbi Malcolm Henry Malits. For services to the community in Merseyside.
- Christopher Peter Maloney. For services to Sport for Disabled People.
- Avtar Singh Mangat. Headteacher, Wilkes Green Junior School, Handsworth, Birmingham. For services to Education.
- John W. L. Mann. For services to Scouting and to the community in Stanton, Suffolk.
- Richard Howard Mann. For services to the community in Donhead St Andrew, Wiltshire.
- Thomas William Smith Mann. Assistant Divisional Officer, Central Scotland Fire Brigade. For services to the Fire Service and to the community in West Lothian.
- Valerie Faith Mann. For services to the community, especially those suffering Mental Illness, in Woodbridge, Suffolk.
- Sarah Manners. For services to the British Red Cross Society in Hampshire.
- John Albert Marchment. For services to Local History in Andover, Hampshire.
- Martha Sheila Wilhelmina Mark. For public service.
- Amy Elizabeth Markham. Lately School Cook. For services to the William Marshall VC Primary School, Welney, Cambridgeshire.
- Brian Marston. For services to the Royal Air Forces Association in Norwich, Norfolk.
- Olive Marston. For services to the community in Heather, Leicestershire.
- David Bennett Martin. For services to the Cupar Highland Games.
- Ian McCrindle Martin. For services to the Stars of Scotland for Cerebral Palsy.
- Catherine Matheson. For charitable services to the Guide Dogs for the Blind Association in Inverness.
- Kenneth David Matthews. Lately Higher Linguist Officer, Ministry of Defence.
- Joyce Mary Maxwell. For services to the MRC Child Psychiatry Unit.
- Helen Janet Crichton McCulloch. For services to the Farmers' Club London.
- John Peter McDonald. Personal Aid and Inquiries Officer (Welfare), Corporation of London. For services to the community, especially Homeless People.
- Sidney Claude McFarlane. Lately Retired Officer 2, Ministry of Defence.
- Patrick Denis McGillion. For services to the Fire Service.
- John McGowan. Lately Laboratory Analyst, Scottish Agricultural College. For services to Agriculture and to Employee Relations.
- Margaret McIntyre. Staff Nurse. For services to Cardiology Care.
- John McLeod. Head of Education and Training, Suffolk Training and Enterprise Council. For services to the New Deal in Suffolk.
- Margaret Ann McMillan. For services to the South Ayrshire Children's Panel.
- The Reverend William McMillan. For charitable services.
- Fay Annette Catherine McNab. Nuclear Licensing Adviser, Department of Trade and Industry.
- Robert James McNeil. Senior Post Mortem Technician, West Glasgow Hospitals University NHS Trust. For services to Pathology.
- Samuel William James McNeilly. For services to Industry.
- Stanley Roy McNish. For services to Community Relations in London.
- Nitin Mehta. For services to Community Relations in Croydon, Surrey.
- Frank Albert William Mellor. For services to the Royal Mail and to the community in East London.
- Peter Mercer. President, the Gypsy Council for Education, Culture, Welfare and Civil Rights. For services to Gypsy/Traveller Education.
- Clarissa Joan Millbank. For services to Cambridge House and to the community in Southwark, London.
- Francis James Miller. For services to the Fintry Community Council, Dundee.
- Joseph Miller. For services to Local Government.
- Lesley Millett. Director, Wastebusters Ltd. For services to the Environment.
- Gloria Helenly Mills. Director of Equal Opportunities, UNISON. For services to the Trade Union Movement.
- Kenneth Trevor Mills. Lately Higher Executive Officer, Ministry of Agriculture, Fisheries and Food.
- Anthony Milner. Section Officer, Derbyshire Special Constabulary. For services to the Police.
- Leslie Harold Milner. Lately Inspector of Taxes, HM Board of Inland Revenue.
- John Stanley Milward JP. For services to the community in Reading, Berkshire.
- Betty Irene Mitchell. For services to the community in Gravesend, Kent.
- Desmond R. D. Mitchell. For services to Local Government.
- Ruby June Margot Montgomery. Lately Tax Enquiry Centre Manager, HM Board of Inland Revenue.
- Jean Moore JP. For services to Local Government and to the community in Newark, Nottinghamshire.
- Jean Moore. For services to the community in Swaffham Prior, Cambridgeshire.
- John Verdun Moore. For services to the Roofing Industry.
- Stephanie Susan Moore. Cabin Service Director, British Airways. For services to the Bobby Moore Fund.
- John Alfred Moreels. Group Managing Director, Ward Philipson Group Ltd. For services to Small Businesses.
- Neil William Morgan JP. For services to the community in Sussex.
- Pamela Morgan. MPB3, Employment Service, Department for Education and Employment.
- Sheila Joan Morgan. For services to the community, especially the Volunteer Bureau in Newcastle-under-Lyme, Staffordshire.
- Clare Morpurgo. Co-founder, Farms for City Children. For services to Young People.
- Michael Morpurgo. Co-founder, Farms for City Children. For services to Young People.
- John Richard Morris. For services to OXFAM.
- Robert Morris. For services to University College, Oxford.
- Miriam Alma Moyle. For services to the community, especially Music, in St Keverne, Cornwall.
- Leo Peter Mulligan. For services to Electrical Engineering and to the community.
- David Owen Mumford. For services to Drama for Visually Impaired People.
- Dorcas Elisabeth Munday. Vice-Chair, Wellingborough Council for the Disabled. For services to Disabled People.
- James Munkley. For services to Sport for Disabled People.
- Joan Mary Murphy. Lately Messenger, Department of Social Security.
- Thomas Loch Murray. For services to the community in Cumnock, Ayrshire.
- David John Mutch. Production Manager, Devonport Management Ltd. For services to the Defence Industry.
- William Scott Neish. Lately General Manager, Marks and Spencer, Glasgow. For services to Retailing and to the community.
- Florence Newton. For services to the community, especially Health Care, in Putney London.
- John Christopher Newton. For services to the Southern Electric Museum, Christchurch, Dorset.
- Philip Reginald Thomas Nicholls. Inspector, Avon and Somerset Constabulary. For services to the Police and to Young People.
- Peter Franz Nicol. For services to Squash.
- Isobel Lucy Wishart Nicolson. For services to the community in Plockton, Ross-shire.
- Ian Lyneburn Galbraith Niven. For services to Young People and to Association Football in Manchester.
- Ernest Albert Norman. For services to People with Learning Disabilities in Plymouth, Devon.
- Valerie Norman. For services to the Musgrove Leukaemia Group, Taunton, Somerset.
- Mary Catherine Patricia O'Doherty. Business Support, HM Board of Customs and Excise.
- April Ann O'Nions. PB8, Employment Services, Department for Education and Employment.
- Helen O'Shea. Intelligence Officer, HM Customs and Excise.
- Mary Margaret Oakes. Chair of Governors, Anchorsholme County Primary School, Blackpool. For services to Education and to the community.
- Samuel Francis Desmond Orr. Honorary Treasurer, Padstones. For services to Young Homeless People.
- Royston Douglas Orringe. For services to the National Association of Retired Firefighters.
- John (Desmond Jack) Ougham. For services to the Sea Cadet Corps in Whitstable, Kent.
- David Anthony Page. Director, Wigan Borough Partnership. For services to Business and to the community in Wigan, Lancashire.
- Albert John Palmer, Lately Steward II, Britannia Royal Naval College, Ministry of Defence.
- John Raymond Parke. For services to the Engineering Industry.
- Ian Rodney Parrish. Assistant Vehicle Examiner, Vehicle Inspectorate Executive Agency, Department for the Environment, Transport and the Regions.
- Richard Lewis Parsey. Auxiliary Coastguard in Charge, Suffolk. For services to Marine Safety.
- Jasper Parsons. For services to the Aquaculture and Fishing Industry.
- Alfred George Charles Partridge. For services to the community on the Beecholme Estate, Clapton, London.
- Patrick John Patrick. Lately Director and Chief Executive, Consumer Credit Trade Association. For services to the Consumer Credit Industry.
- Ruth Isabel Patterson. For services to the Voluntary Sector.
- Geoffrey Kenneth Payne. Project Manager, BSI Standards. For services to Quality Standards.
- Alec Alfred Pease. For services to the Far East Prisoners of War Association.
- Alec John Peaty. Stores Assistant, BSG Builders Merchants. For services to the Builders Merchants Industry.
- Peter John Perkins. Chairman, National Association of Taxi and Private Hire Licensing and Enforcement Officers. For services to Standards of Taxi and Private Hire Licensing.
- Audrey Peters. For services to the community through the Salvation Army.
- Gloria Phillips. Service Unit Manager, Planned Hospital Discharge Scheme, Lewisham. For services to Home Care for Elderly People.
- Judith Pitchers JP. For services to the Board of Visitors, HM Prison Gartree.
- Gerald Harold David Pitman. For services to the community, especially Local History in Sherborne, Dorset.
- Leslie George Pitts. For services to the community in Buntingford, Hertfordshire.
- Joseph Porter. For services to Church Bell Ringing and to the community in Bury, Lancashire.
- William Geddes Potts. Waterway Supervisor, British Waterways. For services to the Grantham Canal.
- George Powell. State Enrolled Nurse, South Manchester Hospitals University Trust. For services to Health Care.
- Martin Prater. Internal Auditor. For services to the Notting Hill Housing Trust.
- Paul Preston. Mobile Library Unit Driver/Library Assistant. For services to the community in Newcastle-under-Lyme.
- Mary Pretty. For services to Limbless People in Roehampton, London.
- John Richard Price. Local Supervisor Turkey, Commonwealth War Graves Commission.
- Laurie Anthony Prince. Head of Engineering, Hawk Integration BAe. For services to Engineering.
- Josephine Ann Pringle. For services to Riding for the Disabled in Wales.
- Alice Mary Prior DL. For services to the Bristol Cathedral Trust.
- Herbert Gerald Procter. For services to Business and to the community in Yorkshire.
- Thomas Proctor. For services to the Duke of Edinburgh Award Scheme and to Young People in Staffordshire.
- Francis Manning Marlborough Pryor. Director of Archaeology, Fenland Archaeological Trust. For services to Tourism.
- Norma Frances Joan Ramsey. For services to the Epsom and Ewell Talking Newspaper, Surrey.
- Charles Robert Randell. For services to Victim Support.
- John Roland Reader. For services to the Captain Cook Schoolroom Museum, Great Ayton, North Yorkshire.
- Thomas Millar Redpath. For services to the Duke of Edinburgh Award Scheme in Berwickshire.
- Deirdre Rosemary Redstone. Project Co-ordinator, North Bournemouth Crime Prevention Panel, Dorset Police. For services to Crime Prevention.
- William Skyrme Rees. Headteacher, Priory Junior School. For services to Education in Pembrokeshire, West Wales.
- Ivan William Reid. Works Engineer, North West Water Ltd. For services to the Water Industry.
- Richard Frederick Rendle. Operations Executive Sandquay, Vosper Thornycroft (UK) Ltd. For service to the Royal Naval College, Dartmouth.
- Ronald Restall. Parent-Governor, Ian Ramsey CE Secondary and Rosehill Infant Schools, Stockton-on-Tees. For services to Education on Tees-side.
- Arthur Paul Reynolds. For services to Church Conservation and to the community in Leighton Buzzard, Bedfordshire.
- Gillian Reynolds. Radio Critic, The Daily Telegraph. For services to Journalism.
- Hossain Rezaei. Managing Director, Pride Valley Foods. For services to the Ethnic and speciality bread sector.
- Dorothy Richardson. For services to Mental Health Care Provision and to the community in East Yorkshire.
- Maureen Ringrose. For services to the WRVS in Ross and Cromarty Ross-shire.
- Kerr Robertson. Lately Forest Officer, Forestry Commission.
- Robert Robertson. For services to Crime Prevention and Drug Awareness in Carnoustie, Angus.
- Uisdean Iain MacDonald Robertson. Area Manager (North), Caledonian MacBrayne Ltd. For services to the Ferry Industry.
- Anne Robinson. For services to Bereaved Parents and to the Francis House Children's Hospice in Didsbury, Manchester.
- Cedric Robinson. The Queen's Guide to the Sands of Morecambe Bay. For services to the community in Cumbria.
- Malcom Graham Robinson. For services to the Northampton Grammar School.
- Robert James Robinson. For services to Young People.
- Sarah Elizabeth Margaret Robinson. For service to Nursery Education.
- The Reverend Canon Patricia Anne Robson. For services to the White Cross Mission and to Young People in Romania.
- Jack Roche. For services to the community on Jersey.
- Beryl Georgina Rogers. For services to Community Relations in Birmingham.
- Helen Rollason. For services to Sport Broadcasting and to charities.
- Cyril Rosen. For services to the UK's International Primate Protection League.
- The Reverend Raymond Stephen David Rossiter. For services to ex-Service Associations.
- Joshua Rowe. Chair of Governors, King David High School Manchester. For services to Education.
- John Alwyn Rowlands. For services to Employment Relations in North and Mid-Wales.
- David Stalker Roy. For services to Association Football for Young People in Scotland.
- Edward Campbell Ruddock. For services to Architecture and to Building Conservation.
- Ursula Russell. Chair, Quality Careers Service, Coventry. For services to Education Training and Careers Guidance.
- Daniel Patrick Ryan. For charitable services in Birmingham.
- Carl Antony Rylatt. Sub Officer, West Midlands Fire Service. For services to Young People.
- Mary Salter. For services to the National Trust.
- Penelope Elisabeth Louise Salter. Commercial Services Manager, Deep Sea Seals Ltd. For services to the Marine Defence Industry.
- Guy Henry Sander. Senior Officer, HM Board of Customs and Excise.
- Thomas Nicholas Scade. For services to Training and Education in the Hotel and Catering Industry.
- Rosemary Anne Schlee. For services to OXFAM.
- John Scott. For services to Housing, particularly Renovation, in Glasgow.
- Alan Scotthorne. For services to Angling.
- Thomas Sefton. Firefighter, Merseyside Fire Brigade. For services to the Duke of Edinburgh Award Scheme.
- Mabel Self. For services to the community in Holyhead, Anglesey.
- David Severn. For services to the Hansard Society.
- Iris Shanahan JP. For services to the Townswomen's Guild.
- Chin Ming Shao. Laundry Contractor/Tailor. For services to the Royal Navy.
- Kiran Sharma JP. Pay Account Officer, Home Office.
- Reginald Harry Shipman. Technical Adviser, LP Gas Association. For services to the Petroleum Gas Industry.
- Paul Joseph Shrubsall. For services to the Barristers' Clerks' Profession.
- Alexander Silbergh. For services to Choral Music in Buckie, Banffshire.
- Alfred Simla. For services to the Association of Jewish Ex-Servicemen and to the Jewish community in Bournemouth, Dorset.
- Professor Peter John Simkins. For services to the Imperial War Museum.
- John Brian Dickinson Simpson JP. For services to the community in Swansea, South Wales.
- Gulab Sucha Singh. Health Promotion Manager, North West Lancashire. For services to the NHS and to the Ethnic Community.
- Stephanie Slater. Lately Senior Prison Officer, Prison Services, Home Office.
- Anne Smith. Headteacher, Crickhowell County Primary School, Powys. For services to Education.
- Mary Smith. Gaelic Singer. For services to Music.
- Patricia Catherine Smith. Headteacher Abercorn School, Glasgow. For services to Children with Special Educational Needs.
- Philip Gordon Pearce-Smith. For services to the League of Venturers Search and Rescue.
- Albert Snow. Plant Fitter and Welder, Grimshaw Kinnear Ltd. For services to the Construction Industry.
- Eng Tao Soh. Administrative Assistant, Department of Social Security.
- Phedias Soteriou. Detective Constable, Metropolitan Police. For services to the Police and to the Greek-Cypriot community.
- Harry Speight. Lately Member OFWAT Southern Customer Service Committee. For services to Water Customers in Southern England.
- Dorothy Mary Stafford. For humanitarian services in Bosnia.
- Edith Eleanor Stammers. For services to Elderly and Disabled People in East Molesey, Surrey.
- Edwin Albert Stanley. Lately Senior Professional and Technology Officer, Highways Agency, Department for the Environment, Transport and the Regions.
- Ernest Alexander Stear. For services to Church Music in North Yorkshire.
- Hugh Steele. For services to the community in Dornoch, Sutherland.
- Roy Kenneth Campbell Stewart. For services to the Police.
- Jean Stockill. Administrative Officer, Highways Agency, Department for the Environment, Transport and the Regions.
- Robert Arthur Storey. For services to Scouting in Aberdeenshire and Banff.
- Gerard Michael Stothard JP. For services to Education in Hertfordshire.
- Peter Marshall Sturge. Senior Probation Officer. For services to the Probation and Prison services.
- Marlene Patricia Suart. Customer Service Manager, HM Board of Inland Revenue.
- Mohammad Ishaque Suleman. Lately General Medical Practitioner, East Sussex. For services to Patient Care.
- Joyce Sutton. For services to the community in Birdwell, South Yorkshire.
- Ernest Swailes. For services to the community in Falstone, Northumberland.
- Myrtle Rosemary Ivy Tabel. For services to Education and to Charity on Guernsey.
- David A. G. Taylor. For services to the Prevention of the Spread of HIV/AIDS and to the Care of Sufferers.
- David Mathieson Taylor. For services to Transmissible Spongiform Encephalopathy Research.
- Susan Vanessa Elinot Mary Teers. For services to the Side by Side Theatre Company and to Disabled People in Warwickshire.
- Iwan Gwyn Thomas. For services to Athletics.
- Joseph Glyn Thomas. Farmer. For services to the Farm Animal Welfare Council.
- Mark Richard Thomas. Lately Chairman, Passenger Transport Forum for Employee Development Ltd. For services to Training in the Bus and Coach Industry.
- Stephen William Thomas. Chairman, Port Sunlight and Warrington Joint Senior Stewards Group. For services to Employee Relations.
- Kathleen Wendy Thompson. For services to Swimming for People with Disabilities in Buckinghamshire.
- John Samuel Thorpe. For services to Optometry and to the community in Derbyshire.
- Maureen Winifred Tinker. Personal Secretary, Ministry of Defence.
- Pamela Joan Tinsley. Bookbinder, Remploy Ltd. For services to the Employment of Disabled People.
- Elizabeth Mary Titterington. For services to Fostering in Blackpool, Lancashire.
- Virginia Ann Todd. General Medical Practitioner, London. For services to Medicine and to the community.
- Frederick George William Tomlinson. Constable. For services to the British Transport Police, Doncaster, Yorkshire.
- Gregor Peter John Townsend. For services to Rugby Union Football.
- Ruth Tregellas. Clinical Nurse Specialist/Continence Adviser, Plymouth, Devon. For services to Health Care.
- Mary Trimble. For services to the community.
- Norman Albert Sidney Truscott. For services to the community in Mawgan, Cornwall.
- John Tugwell. Technical Officer, Environmental Health Service, Cotswold District Council. For services to the community in the Cotswolds.
- Jacqueline Anne Shimwell-Tunnicliffe. For services to MENCAP in Matlock, Derbyshire.
- Ellen Mary (Molli) Turner. For charitable services to St Anne's Hospice, Cheadle Hulme, Cheshire.
- Michael Tutton. Milkman. For services to the community in St Albans, Hertfordshire.
- Herbert Lyon Tyldesley. For services to the community in Worsley, Salford, and to the Blind in Salford.
- Harriet Skelton Tyson. For services to the Barrow and District Society for the Blind Ltd., Cumbria.
- Christopher Patrick Underhill. For services to Disabled People.
- Ruth Anne Farquharson Urquhart. Foster Carer. For services to Foster Care in Dundee.
- Anthony Van Laast. Choreographer and Dancer. For services to Dance.
- Eileen Mary (Molly) Vannan. For services to the community.
- Ved Prakash Venayak. For services to Community Relations in Tyne and Wear.
- John Howard Vokins. For services to the Royal Sussex County Hospital.
- Patricia Wakeman. Executive Officer, Forensic Science Service, Home Office.
- Alan James Charles Walker. Sergeant, Staffordshire Police. For services to the Police.
- John Thomas Walker JP. Member, Burntwood Town Council and Lichfield District Council. For services to the community in Burntwood.
- Rose Gwendoline Walker. For services to the community in Stockport, Greater Manchester.
- James Walton. Secretary, Halfway Elderly People's Club. For services to the community in Holbrook, Sheffield.
- Betty Eileen Ward. For services to the Fortis Green Health Clinic, Haringey Health Care NHS Trust.
- Jeanette Warke. For services to Young People.
- Brian Waterhouse. For services to the National Grocers' Benevolent Fund.
- Christine Lynn Waterman. Curator. For services to the Dover Bronze Age Boat Trust.
- Anthony George Andor Wates. Lately Headteacher, Tavistock County Primary School, West Devon. For services to Education.
- David Gordon Watkins. General Dental Practitioner, Norfolk. For services to Dentistry.
- Alan Watson. For services to Engineering and to Young People in Bolton, Lancashire.
- Jean Ann Webster. Support Team Member, Department of Trade and Industry.
- Phyllis Wells. For the maintenance of War Graves in Barry, South Glamorgan.
- Grenville Ethelbert Welsh. For services to the Pig Industry.
- Josephine Ann Whatmough. For services to the Environment.
- John Wheatley. Senior Professional and Technology Officer, Ministry of Defence.
- Derrick William Charles White. For services to the RAF St Athan Voluntary Band.
- Margaret Joan Whitfield. For services to Young People.
- Cecilia Whittle. SEA Consultant Training and Research Associates. For services to Young People.
- Henry Whitworth. Voluntary Observer, Meteorological Office, Cornwall.
- John George Wild. Operations Manager Falsane, Babcock Rosyth Defence Ltd. For services to the Submarine Industry.
- Frank Noon Wilkinson. Export Development Counsellor, Business Link. For services to Export.
- Pamela Wilkinson. Cleaner in Charge. For services to the Wirksworth Infant School, Matlock, Derbyshire.
- Edward Thomas Williams. For services to the South Wales Autistic Society and to the community in Porthcawl, South Wales.
- Harold Williams. For services to Rugby Union Football.
- Jean Williams. Tutor in English and Drama, Hartlepool Sixth Form College. For services to Education.
- Professor Sonia Anne Williams. Dental Practitioner, West Yorkshire. For services to Children's Dental Health, especially for Ethnic Minorities.
- Joseph Edward Kenneth Willson. For services to Conservation in the North of England.
- Alan Wilson. For services to Horticulture.
- Graham Keith Wilson. For services to the Knitting, Dyeing and Lace Industries' Joint Health and Safety Committee.
- Hill Wilson. For services to Industry and to Engineering.
- Peter Garnet Wilson. For public service.
- Shelah Wilson. For services to the Cancer Research Campaign.
- Eric Henry Frank Wood. For services to Leeds General Hospital.
- James Patrick Wood. For services to Karate.
- Norman Alan Wood. For services to the Royal British Legion in Northamptonshire.
- Harry Woodford. Member, Kingston upon Hull City Council. For services to the community in Kingston upon Hull.
- Lorraine Woolley. Deputy Chief Commandant, Metropolitan Police Special Constabulary. For services to the Police.
- Patricia Wooster. Director, Midwifery and Paediatric Services, Ealing. For services to Midwifery.
- Michael Edwin Wragg. Rivers Operative, Environment Agency. For services to Employee Relations and Environmental Protection.
- Kenneth William Wright. Manager, Scouts Offshore in Colchester Essex. For services to Young People.
- Stephen Wheldon Wright. Honorary Secretary, Gloucestershire Association of Parish and Town Councils. For services to Local Councils and to the community in Gloucestershire.
- Steve Wright. Chairman, London Private Hire Car Association. For services to Transport in London.
- John Ian Wyles JP. Lately Member, Stirling Council. For services to Local Government.
- Lilian Wylie. For services to Glasgow College of Nautical Studies and to The Prince and Princess of Wales Hospice Glasgow.

=== Order of the British Empire (Civil Division), Diplomatic Service and Overseas List ===
==== Dame Commander (DBE) ====
- The Honourable Lois Marie Browne-Evans. Minister of Legislative Affairs, Bermuda.

==== Knight Commander (KBE) ====
- Roderic Michael John Lyne CMG. UK Permanent Representative, United Kingdom Mission to the United Nations, Geneva.

==== Commander (CBE) ====
- The Honourable Mr Justice John Ernest Alcantara OBE. Speaker of the House of Assembly and Mayor of Gibraltar.
- George Lewis (Gerald) Green. Private Secretary to the late Emir of Bahrain.
- John Gilbert Morgan Marshall. Lately Head, European School, Brussels.

==== Officer (OBE) ====
- David John Robert Austin. First Secretary, Foreign and Commonwealth Office.
- Hilary John Barnes. For services to journalism and British-Danish relations.
- David Blaber. Lately Head, Budget Committees Secretariat, NATO.
- Geoffrey Peter Stewart Calvert. For services to British business in Korea.
- John Joseph Crowley LVO. Lately First Secretary, Foreign and Commonwealth Office.
- Yvonne Mary Dodds. Head, Corporate Information Technology, British Council.
- Arthur Charles Valerian Wellesley, Marquess of Douro. For services to British-Spanish Trade relations.
- Fiona Margaret Duby MBE. For service in health and population in Nigeria.
- Lennett Maurice Edwards QPM CPM, Lately Commissioner of Police, Bermuda.
- Professor John Richard Ewen. For services to youth development and to the community in Zambia.
- William Foxton MBE. Lately Member of the European Commission Monitoring Mission.
- Barry Arnall John Gosnold. For services to British exports to the USA.
- Ian James Alastair Graham. For services to Mayan archaeology.
- Alan Hartley Grey. For welfare services to retired officials.
- Professor Alan Haworth. For services to psychiatry and mental illness, Zambia.
- Dr John Munro Hay. Consultant, Foreign and Commonwealth Office.
- Dr Maureen McGrath Henderson. For services to cancer research and prevention.
- Raymond Holliday. Head, British Council School, Madrid.
- Sean Christopher Eric Holt. Counsellor, HM Embassy Bogota.
- Timothy John Isles. Deputy Head, OSCE Mission in Albania.
- Clinton Eliot Leeks. Lately Corporate Development Director, Hong Kong Airport Authority.
- (Lionel) Murray Mccullough. Member of the European Commission Monitoring Mission in Mostar.
- Richard Medley. First Secretary, Foreign and Commonwealth Office.
- (John) Gwynfrin Morgan. For services to the European Commission.
- Professor Brian Sydney Morton. For services to marine ecology, Hong Kong.
- Catherine Elizabeth Nettleton. First Secretary, Foreign and Commonwealth Office.
- David Barry Panton. For services to British-Portuguese trade.
- Richard Graham Philip. For services to veterinary science overseas.
- Professor John Riddoch Poynter OA. For services to the Rhodes Scholarship programme in Australia.
- John Gibson Scott. For services to economic reform in Georgia.
- William Baldie Sinton. Lately HM Ambassador Panama City.
- Paul Jonathan Smith. Director, British Council, New Zealand.
- Robin Simon Southwell. For services to British-Australian trade.
- Jocelyn Grace Statler. For services to Chatham House.
- Euan Rodgers Stewart. For services to customs enforcement in the Caribbean.
- David Victor Thomas. For services to British business in Brazil.
- Professor Michael James Thomas. For services to management education and training, Poland.
- Katherine Frances Wedgwood. China Programme Director, Save the Children Fund.
- Professor Nicholas John White. For services to tropical diseases research.
- Adam Charles Newmarch Williams. For services to British business in China.
- Robert Derek Wright. For services to Police development, Hungary.

==== Member (MBE) ====
- Brian Victor Baker. For services to British business in India.
- Robert Malcolm Barlow. British Honorary Consul, Western Samoa.
- Verla Joy Alexandra Basdeo. For services to education and planning, Cayman Islands.
- Michael Burgoyne. Locally engaged British Vice-Consul, Naples.
- John Francis Dallenger. First Secretary, Foreign and Commonwealth Office.
- Dunstan Dalmain Ebanks. For public service, Cayman Islands.
- Rita Eker. For services to the Women's Campaign for Soviet Jewry.
- Jennifer Frances Estlin. Personal Assistant to the Governor, Montserrat.
- Ruth Evans. For charitable services, British Virgin Islands.
- Yvonne Fitzgerald. Locally engaged Management Officer/Accountant, HM Consulate, Bordeaux.
- Howard Alexander Fox. For services to peacekeeping in Mostar.
- Benjamin Howard Francis Gambold. For services to the British Community in Egypt.
- Vera Rose Gambold. For services to the British Community in Egypt.
- Jean Jose Gault. Personal Assistant to the Legal Adviser, Foreign and Commonwealth Office.
- Jean Maria Gibbons. Second Secretary, Foreign and Commonwealth Office.
- John Kenneth Greengrass. Second Secretary, British High Commission, New Delhi.
- Robin Ewart Hammond. Lately Translator, NATO Secretariat.
- Lewis Harris. For services to British-Israeli relations.
- Winston Eston Harris. For services to the British Army Support Unit, Belize.
- Christopher Anthony Hudson. For services to the Peace Train Organisation, Dublin.
- Peter Mervyn Johnson. For welfare services to the British Community, Kenya.
- Paul Garbutt Kay. For services to British interests, Panama.
- John William Leake. For services to the community, Romania.
- Father Roger Lesser. For services to the poor in India.
- Solomon Levy JP. For public service, Gibraltar.
- John Richard Lindfield. Vice-Consul, HM Consulate General, Cape Town.
- Suzanne Diana Long. For services to the United Nations Association and Human Rights.
- Colette Hazel Mason. Third Secretary, British High Commission, Maseru.
- Bruce Alexander Mcintyre. Second Secretary, HM Embassy, Santiago.
- Robert Christian Millman. For services to health in developing countries.
- Elliot Lionel Beresford Nanton. For services to the local community, Montserrat.
- Wendy Ann Page. Locally engaged Pro-Consul, Switzerland.
- Dr. Ramanbhai Manibhai Patel. For services to the British Community in Gujarat State, India.
- Ira Pearman Philip. For public service, Bermuda.
- Jerome John Piercy. For services to human development in Eastern Europe.
- Linda Wills Plumb. For services to education overseas.
- Mildred Pratt. For services to education in Zambia.
- Pauline Veronica Priestley. Locally engaged Secretary, British Information Services, New York.
- Nicholas John Pyle. Second Secretary, British High Commission, Colombo.
- Robert Hayward Salamon. For services to child welfare in the Philippines.
- Richard Amodeo Di Salvatore. Locally engaged Vice-Consul Commercial, Istanbul.
- John Shand. Butler, HM Ambassador's Residence, Washington.
- Nigel David Short. For services to Chess.
- James Embleton Sidgwick. For services to British interests in Belgium.
- Hamish Cameron-Smith. For services to education and the community, Zambia.
- Olga Stanojlovic. Assistant Policy Director, British Council.
- Alan James Telfer. For welfare services to the British Community, Thailand.
- Michael Ernest Walter Tidnam. For services to the Royal British Legion, Berlin.
- John Michael Frederick Townsend. For services to the Royal Air Force Association in France.
- Nicholas Piers Turnbull. Lately Member, European Commission Monitoring Mission to the Former Republic of Yugoslavia.
- Arthur Frederick Albert Wright. For services to British interests, Malta.

=== Queen's Police Medal (QPM) ===
England and Wales

- Dennis Proctor Bishop. Constable, Greater Manchester Police.
- Michael Burdis. Detective Chief Superintendent, South Yorkshire Police.
- Duncan Nigel Croll. Commander, Metropolitan Police.
- John Stanley Charles Cullum. Assistant Chief Constable (Designated), Suffolk Constabulary.
- Alan Goldsmith. Deputy Chief Constable, Lincolnshire Police.
- James Maurice Hart. Assistant Commissioner, City of London Police.
- Thomas Carl Lloyd. Commander, Metropolitan Police.
- Francis Andrew May. Lately Deputy Chief Constable, Dorset Police.
- Thomas Morrison. Chief Superintendent, Thames Valley Police.
- Robert Dallas Packham. Deputy Director General, National Crime Squad.
- George Gilchrist Russell. Lately Superintendent, Metropolitan Police.
- Michael Brendan Semple. Detective Superintendent, Merseyside Police.
- Terry Martin Seville. Superintendent, Gloucestershire Constabulary.
- David Frederick Stevens. Chief Constable, Essex Police.
- Barry William Strevens. Lately Detective Chief Inspector, Metropolitan Police.
- Michael John Waldren. Superintendent, Metropolitan Police.
- Anthony Melvyn Whittle. Lately Detective Superintendent, West Yorkshire Police.
- John Williams. Constable, Norfolk Constabulary.

Scotland

- Eric Richard Drummond. Chief Inspector, Tayside Police.
- Peter Mowat Wilson. Deputy Chief Constable, Grampian Police.

Northern Ireland

- James William Hamilton Detective Chief Superintendent Royal Ulster Constabulary.
- Eugene Silveraus Kearney. Superintendent, Royal Ulster Constabulary.
- Wilfred Maurice Murphy. Superintendent, Royal Ulster Constabulary.

=== Queen's Fire Service Medal (QFSM) ===
England and Wales

- Barry Dixon. Assistant Chief Fire Officer, Greater Manchester County Fire Service.
- Ian Christopher Dominy. Assistant Chief Fire Officer, Dorset Fire and Rescue Service.
- Michael James Norton. Station Officer, West Midlands Fire Service.
- Kenneth Peter Ratcliffe. Divisional Officer III, Derbyshire Fire and Rescue Service.
- Graham Thomas Thompson. Deputy Chief Fire Officer, Lancashire Fire and Rescue Service.

Scotland

- Hugh Alastair Anderson. Retained Sub-Officer Fife, Fire and Rescue Service.
- Gordon George Kennedy. Assistant Firemaster, Grampian Fire Brigade.

Northern Ireland

- Kenneth Hugh Spence. Station Officer, Belfast Fire Brigade

=== Queen's Volunteer Reserves Medal (QVRM) ===
Royal Navy

- Commander Kevin John Kinsella RD, Royal Naval Reserve.

Army

- 24587471 Warrant Officer Class 1 James Graeme Campbell Abernethy, The Highlanders, Territorial Army.
- Lieutenant-Colonel Nigel Crawford Beacom TD (509850), Royal Corps of Signals, Territorial Army.
- 24133767 Sergeant Thomas James Cherry Dempsey, Corps of Royal Engineers, Territorial Army.
- Major Joseph Owen TD (468240), Adjutant General's Corps (Staff and Personnel Support), Territorial Army.

Royal Air Force

- Wing Commander Robert Gordon Kemp AE (4232872 N), Royal Auxiliary Air Force.
- Wing Commander William Robert McQueen MBE AE (0300756 X), Royal Air Force Reserve.

=== Colonial Police and Fire Service Medal (CPM) ===
- Louis Wink. Chief Inspector, Royal Gibraltar Police.
- Derek William Haines. Detective Chief Superintendent, Commissioner of Police, Cayman Islands.

== Bahamas ==
=== Order of St Michael and St George (CMG) ===
==== Companion ====
- Godfrey Kenneth Kelly. For services to the growth and development of The Bahamas.
- Fane Solomon. For services to the development of The Bahamas.
- Lately Senior Justice Joseph Cowan Strachan. For services to the legal profession.

=== Order of the British Empire (Civil Division) ===
==== Officer (OBE) ====
- Vylma Bloneva Thompson-Curling. For public service.
- Garet Orlando Finlayson. For services to the economic growth and development of The Bahamas.
- John Orage Kenning. For services to Finance in The Bahamas.
- Cedric Aubrey Wentworth Saunders. For services to the insurance industry.

==== Member (MBE) ====
- Mildred Bridgette Bowe. For public service.
- Roy Davis. For services to civic development.
- Lawrence Fred Arthur Griffin. For services to the growth and development of the Family Islands.
- Floyd Orazia Lowe JP. For services to the growth and development of the Family Islands.
- Richard Lawrence Malcolm JP. For services to the community.

=== British Empire Medal (BEM) ===
- Arthur Talmadge Bain. For services to the community.
- Moses Cedric Ferguson. For services to the construction industry.
- Vantlock Granville Fowler. For services to the economic growth and development of The Bahamas.
- Naomi Ruth Hanna-Mackey. For community service.
- Harold Anderson Major. For services to the community.
- The Reverend Norris Holman McDonald. For services to education.
- Willis Ervin McKinney. For services to education.
- John Alfred Sherman QPM CPM. Formerly Royal Bahamas Police Force. For services in the field of law enforcement.
- Osbourn Weech JP. For services to the growth and development of the community.

== Belize ==
=== Order of the British Empire ===
==== Officer (OBE) ====
- Philip Zuniga. For public service.

==== Member (MBE) ====
- Myrtle Palacio. For community service.

=== British Empire Medal (BEM) ===
- Maureen Lavern Leslie. Superintendent, Belize Police Force.
- Raymond Karl Thimbrel. Assistant Commissioner, Belize Police Force.

== Grenada ==
=== Order of the British Empire ===
==== Commander (CBE) ====
- Godwin Algernon Brathwaite OBE. For public service.

==== Member (MBE) ====
- Thomas Beggs. For services to education.

=== British Empire Medal (BEM) ===
- Rosalind Alexis. For services to nursing.
- Cyprian Thaddeus Gibbs. For services to farming.
- Sydney De Costa Law. For services to the Civil Service and to Agriculture.

== Niue ==
=== New Zealand Order of Merit ===
==== Companion (CNZM) ====
- Frank Fakaotimanava Lui – of Alofi North. For services to Niue, lately as Premier of Niue.

=== Queen's Service Medal (QSM) ===
==== For public services ====
- Jack Willie Lipitoa – of Namukulu.
- Togiafavale Viviani – of Hakupu.

== Papua New Guinea ==
=== Order of St Michael and St George ===
==== Companion (CMG) ====
- Ian Ling-Stuckey. For services to the community, business and politics.

=== Order of the British Empire (Civil Division) ===
==== Knight Commander (KBE) ====
- Roy Yaki. For political and public service.

==== Officer (OBE) ====
- Mikawe Ahuzale. For services to the community, business and politics.
- Philip Kapal. For services to the private sector and politics.
- Ron Ranu Kidu. For services to the judiciary and the community.
- Father Caedmon Koieba. For services to religion and local government.
- Esau Passingan. For services to local government and the community.
- Morea Vele. For public service.

==== Member (MBE) ====
- Puliasi Daniel. For services to the community.
- Samuel Keura. For services to local government and the community.
- Pim Korobe. For services to law and order.
- Mek Singiliong. For services to politics and the community.

== Saint Lucia ==
=== Order of St Michael and St George ===
==== Companion (CMG) ====
- Ignace Ferrel Victor Charles. For services to Industry, Commerce, Sports and the Arts.

=== Order of the British Empire (Civil Division) ===
==== Officer (OBE) ====
- Anthony Morgan Avril. For services to the community service.
- Pascal Watson Louis. For services to the community.

==== Member (MBE) ====
- Charles Clive Alexis. For community and public service.
- Thomas Johannes. For services to education.
- Norella Denise Edgitha Tobias. For services to education.

=== British Empire Medal (BEM) ===
- Mary Elizabeth Aubertin. For community service.
- Primus Joseph Duplessis. For community and public.
- Euriza James. For community service.

== Saint Vincent and the Grenadines ==
=== British Empire Medal (BEM) ===
- Cardinal Leopold Simon. For community service.

== Solomon Islands ==
=== Order of the British Empire ===
==== Commander (CBE) ====
- Frank Short. Commissioner, Royal Solomon Islands Police Force.

==== Officer (OBE) ====
- Edmund Hugh Andresen. For public and political service.
- George Angono Hiele. For public and diplomatic service.
- Mathias Ramoni. For services to education and politics.

==== Member (MBE) ====
- Matthew Houaisuta. For services to commerce.
- Albert Bakele Laore. For public and political service.
- Phylis Margaret Taloikwai. For administrative service.

== Tuvalu ==
=== Order of the British Empire ===
==== Officer (OBE) ====
- Solomona Metia Tealofi. For public and community service.

==== Member (MBE) ====
- Tagata Lopati. For public and community service.
- Maatusi Nofoaiga. For public and community service.

=== British Empire Medal (BEM) ===
- Nafatali Filemoni. For services to the community.
- Tukeu Folia. For services to the community.
- Levi Teagai. For public and community service.
