= Filleul =

Filleul is a French surname. Notable people with the surname include:

- Adelaide Filleul, Marquise de Souza-Botelho (1761–1836), French writer
- Clara Filleul (1822–1878), French painter and author
- Don Filleul (1926–2016), Jersey politician
- Nicolas Filleul de La Chesnaye (1530–1575), French poet
- Philip Filleul (1885–1974), English rower
- Rosalie Filleul (1752–1794), French pastellist and painter

== See also ==
- Jeanne Filleul-Brohy (1867–1937), French croquet player
