= Mike Melluish =

English cricketer and cricket administrator

Personal information
- Full name: Michael Edward Lovelace Melluish
- Born: 13 June 1932; Westcliff-on-Sea, Essex, England
- Died: 8 February 2014 (aged 81); Bradford on Avon, Wiltshire, England
- Batting: Right-handed
- Role: Wicketkeeper

Career statistics
Competition	First-class
Matches	49
Runs scored	524
Batting average	10.48
100s/50s	0/0
Top score	36
Catches/stumpings	80/35
- Source: Cricinfo, 9 February 2014

Michael Edward Lovelace Melluish OBE (13 June 1932 – 8 February 2014) was a first-class cricketer and cricket administrator in England.

Mike Melluish was born in Westcliff-on-Sea, Essex, and educated at Rossall School in Lancashire. He captained the school team in 1951, his final year, setting a school record of 913 runs in the season, at an average of 70.23, and he opened the batting and kept wicket for the Public Schools in their annual match against Combined Services at Lord's.

At Caius College, Cambridge, Melluish was a regular in the university side throughout his three years as a student from 1954 to 1956. He was secretary of the club in 1955 and captain in 1956. His batting declined (442 runs at 11.33 in 41 matches for Cambridge University, with a top score of 36) and by 1956 he was batting at number 10, but his wicket-keeping brought him 65 catches and 30 stumpings for the university, many of them off the leg-spin bowling of Gamini Goonesena.

In 1956 Melluish played for the Gentlemen in both their matches against the Players, at Lord's and Scarborough. He played one County Championship match for Middlesex in 1957, and one first-class match for Marylebone Cricket Club (MCC), one more for the Gentlemen, and three for D.R. Jardine's XI. He played no first-class cricket after 1959. He captained MCC on a short tour to the Netherlands and Denmark in August 1963.

Melluish served as Treasurer and President of MCC. He was awarded an OBE in the 1999 Queen's Birthday honours for services to cricket. He was a Trustee of the MCC Foundation.
