= Brian Ernest Maitland Prophet =

Colonel Brian Ernest Maitland Prophet OBE TD DL
- Born: 1928; Bedford, England
- Died: 10 December 2004 (aged 75–76); Bedford, England
- Occupations: Civil Servant (HM Customs and Excise) colonel in the Territorial Army
- Known for: OBE for services to Soldiers, Sailors and Airmens Family Association; Deputy Lieutenant of Bedfordshire

Brian Ernest Maitland Prophet OBE TD DL (1928–2004) was president of the Bedfordshire Branch of the Soldiers, Sailors and Airmens Family Association and a Deputy Lieutenant for Bedfordshire. He was awarded the OBE, TD and made Deputy Lieutenant for Bedfordshire in recognition of his long association and work with the Territorial Army, the Royal Signals and the Bedfordshire ACF as well as being an active participant with service charities.

== Life ==
Prophet was born in Bedford in 1928. He was educated at Bedford Modern School.

After school, Prophet joined Civil Service working principally in HM Customs and Excise. In addition to his career in the Civil Service, he had a long association with the Territorial Army, the Royal Signals, the Bedfordshire ACF as well as being an active participant with service charities. He attained the rank of colonel in the Territorials.

In 1985 he was made a deputy lieutenant of Bedfordshire. He was invested as an Officer of the Order of the British Empire in the 1999 Birthday Honours for his loyal service to the Soldiers, Sailors and Airmens Family Association.

Prophet died in Bedford on 10 December 2004.
