= Phyllis Taloikwai =

Solomon Islander government official

Phyllis Margaret Taloikwai MBE was a senior government official in the Solomon Islands. She was the first woman in the Solomon Islands to be appointed a permanent secretary in the public service.

== Life ==
Taloikwai was born and grew up in the province of Isabel. In 1992 she was appointed permanent secretary for agriculture and fisheries, becoming the first woman to be appointed to this level of seniority in the Solomon Islands. She also served as chair of the National Disaster Council.

In the 1999 Queen's Birthday Honours she was made a Member of the Order of the British Empire for administrative services.
