= Lesley Southgate =

British physician and academic (born 1943)

Professor Dame Lesley Jill Southgate, DBE (born 25 September 1943) is a British physician, general practitioner, and academic. She was President of the Royal College of General Practitioners from 2000 to 2003. Since 2004, she has been Professor of Medical Education at St George's, University of London.

== Honours ==
In the 1999 Birthday Honours, Southgate was appointed a Dame Commander of the Order of the British Empire (DBE) "for services to Standards of Practice and to Primary Care".
