= Philip Hunter (educationist) =

Sir Philip John Hunter CBE (born 1939, Northumberland) is an English educationist who was the Schools Adjudicator for England from 2002 to 2009.

== Early life ==
He passed the eleven plus, but as the nearest grammar school was too distant, he went to the Quaker School, Ackworth School (boarding school) in Yorkshire. He studied Zoology at Kings College, Newcastle.

== Career ==
He lectured and undertook research for two years at the University of Khartoum in Sudan then for three years at the Agricultural Research Council (became the AFRC in 1983 then the BBSRC in 1994) in Cambridge. His research was into the effects of pesticide on slugs and snails, and the spread of the disease Bilharzia. He worked at the DES and Civil Service College (now known as the National School of Government) for ten years, including serving as Principal Private Secretary to two Secretaries of State. He became Deputy Chief Education Officer at ILEA then Chief Education Officer at Staffordshire LEA.

=== Schools Adjudicator ===
He became the Chief Schools Adjudicator on 1 September 2002 operating from an office based in Mowden, Darlington on the site of a former private school. In December 2009 he stepped down and was replaced by Dr Ian Craig.

== Recognition ==
He was knighted in the June 2008 Queen's Birthday Honours for services to Education. He was made a CBE in the 1999 Birthday Honours.

== Personal life ==
He met his wife, Ruth, at the Quaker School, Ackworth. Together, they have three children.
