= G. David Green =

Sir Gregory David Green
- Born: 1948 (age 77–78); United Kingdom
- Occupations: past Chairman of Dartington Hall Trust, The Prince's School of Traditional Arts

Sir Gregory David Green, KCMG CVO (1948) is a former chairman of the Dartington Hall Trust and The Prince's School of Traditional Arts. He is a former director-general of the British Council, former chairman of Royal Commonwealth Society, and former president of the European Union National Institutes for Culture.

== Early career ==
Green originally trained as a teacher, going on to work at two schools in South Yorkshire.

== Later career ==
Between 1976 and 1990 Green served with Save the Children, eventually becoming Deputy Secretary-General. From 1990 to 1999, he was Director of the Voluntary Service Overseas. In 1999, he became Secretary-General of the British Council. He chaired the Dartington Hall Trust, The Prince's School of Traditional Arts, and serves on the board at The Royal Court Theatre and London University of the Arts.

== Personal life ==
Green is married to a retired primary school teacher and has three daughters.

== Honours ==
Green was awarded the Companion of the Order of St. Michael and St. George in 1999 and was made a Knight Commander in 2004. In 2018 he was appointed a Commander of the Royal Victorian Order for his work with The Prince’s School of Traditional Arts.
