= Christopher Howes =

British academic

Sir Christopher Kingston Howes KCVO CB FRICS FRIBA (born 30 January 1942) is a specialist in the study and management of land and buildings, with careers in the public, private, and academic sectors, he has worked in city planning, land use, and environmental management.

After ten years as Director of Land and Property at the Department of the Environment, Howes was Chief Executive of the Crown Estate from 1989 to 2001. He was a member of the councils of the Duchy of Lancaster and the Duchy of Cornwall.

== Early life ==
The younger son of Leonard Howes OBE and Marion Howes (née Bussey), he was educated at Gresham's School, Holt, and the University of London, where he graduated BSc in estate management in 1965. His father was Lord Mayor of Norwich for 1963–1964. He became an Associate of the Royal Institution of Chartered Surveyors in 1966 and graduated as a master of philosophy at the University of Reading in 1975.

== Career ==
Howes's career has spanned the public and private sectors. In 1965 to 1967 he worked in the Valuation and Planning Department of the Greater London Council, then from 1967 to 1978 he was Steward and Honorary Surveyor to the Dean and Chapter of Norwich Cathedral. At the beginning of 1969 he joined the family firm of Percy Howes & Co., Surveyors and Valuers, of Cathedral Close, Norwich. Also becoming a member of Norwich City Council, by 1974 he was a Justice of the Peace for Norfolk. In Norwich he was a founding member of the Theatre Royal Trust, the Cotman Housing Association, and the Third World Centre.

From 1979 to 1989, Howes was Deputy Director of Land Economy and then Director of the Land and Property Division at the Department of the Environment. He was also a visiting professor at University College London from 1983 to 2001; Chairman of the World Land Policy Conference 1984, and the OECD's Urban Policy Group 1985.

From 1992 to 1999, Howes was a trustee of the Prince of Wales's Institute of Architecture; from 1995 to 1998 a Member of the Secretary of State for the Environment's Thames Advisory Board, and a Member of the Court of Advisers of St Paul's Cathedral.

From 1989 to 2001, he was the Second Commissioner and Chief Executive of the Crown Estate. This owns large area of Central London including Regent Street, over half of Britain's forests, hundreds of farms and other rural estates, and the whole of the British seabed between the coast and the twelve-mile international limit. In 2006, the annual income of the Crown Estate was around £200 million. He also served as a member of the Prince’s Council, the Duchy of Cornwall, and as a Council member of the Duchy of Lancaster.

From 2001 to 2017 Howes was an adviser to Barclays Capital and a member of the advisory board and Senior Adviser to Barclays Private Bank. He is a member of the Council of the Duchy of Cornwall; Deputy Chairman of Howard de Walden Estates; adviser to the Marcol Group; a member of the Investment Committee of St Paul's Cathedral; a board member of the British Architectural Trust; a trustee of the Suffolk Historic Churches Trust; a trustee of the Norfolk Archaeological Trust, and patron of the Heatherley School of Fine Art.

== Career outline ==
- 1965 to 1967: The Greater London Council
- 1967 to 1979: Professional practice in Norwich and London
- 1979 to 1989: Director of Land and Property Division of the Department of the Environment
- 1982 to 1989: Second Commissioner of the Crown Estate
- 1989 to 2000: Chief Executive of the Crown Estate
- 1993 to 2005: Member of Council of the Duchy of Lancaster
- 1998 to 2004: Non-executive director of the Norwich and Peterborough Building Societ
- 2005 to 2007: Non-executive Chairman of the Barclays Bank Property Finance Team
- 1990 to 2011: Member of the Prince’s Council of the Duchy of Cornwall
- 2001 to 2013: Member Advisory Board Barclays Private Bank
- 2001 to 2017: Advisor Barclays Property Finance Team
- 2001 to date: Director of the Howard de Walden Estate
- 2010 to date: Deputy Chairman of the Howard de Walden Estate
- 2002 to 2016: Director of the Colville Estate Ltd
- 2001 to 2016: Director of Compco PLC
- 2013 to 2017: Senior Adviser Barclays Wealth and Investment Management
- 2016 to date: Trustee Britten Pears Foundation
- 2018 to date: Director the Britten Estate Limited

== Academic appointments ==
- 1975: Senior Visiting Fellow, School of Environmental Sciences, University of East Anglia
- 1976-1981: part-time lecturer, Department of Land Economy, the University of Cambridge
- 1974–1980: Visiting Lecturer, University of Reading
- 1982: Visiting Lecturer, University of Aberdeen
- 1983: Visiting Lecturer, UCLA and USC
- 1984 to 2001: Visiting Professor, The Bartlett School of Architecture and Planning, University College London .
- 1985: Visiting Lecturer, Harvard University
- 1985: Visiting Lecturer, University of North Carolina Chapel Hill and University of Miami
- 1990 to date: Member of the Court of the University of East Anglia

== Honours ==
- 1993: Companion of the Order of the Bath
- 1995: Honorary Fellow of the Royal Institute of British Architects
- 1997: Commander of the Royal Victorian Order
- 1999; Freeman of the City of London.
- 1999: Knight Commander of the Royal Victorian Order
- 2000: Honorary DLitt degree, University of East Anglia

-- Publications--

- Acquiring Office Space (1975) (joint author)
- Value Maps: A Survey Into the Production and Use of Land and Property Value Maps (University of Reading Department of Land Management and Development, 1976)
- Value Maps: aspects of land and property values (Geo Books, 1979)
- Innovations in Urban Revitalization: Papers Presented to the World Congress on Land Policy, 1986 (Lincoln Institute of Land Policy, 1987)
- "Urban regeneration initiatives in England" in Land Development Studies, Vol. 5, No. 1, January 1988, pp. 57-65
- Economic Regeneration (monograph, 1988)
- Urban Revitalization (monograph, 1988)
- Papers in learned journals
