= MV Gardyloo =

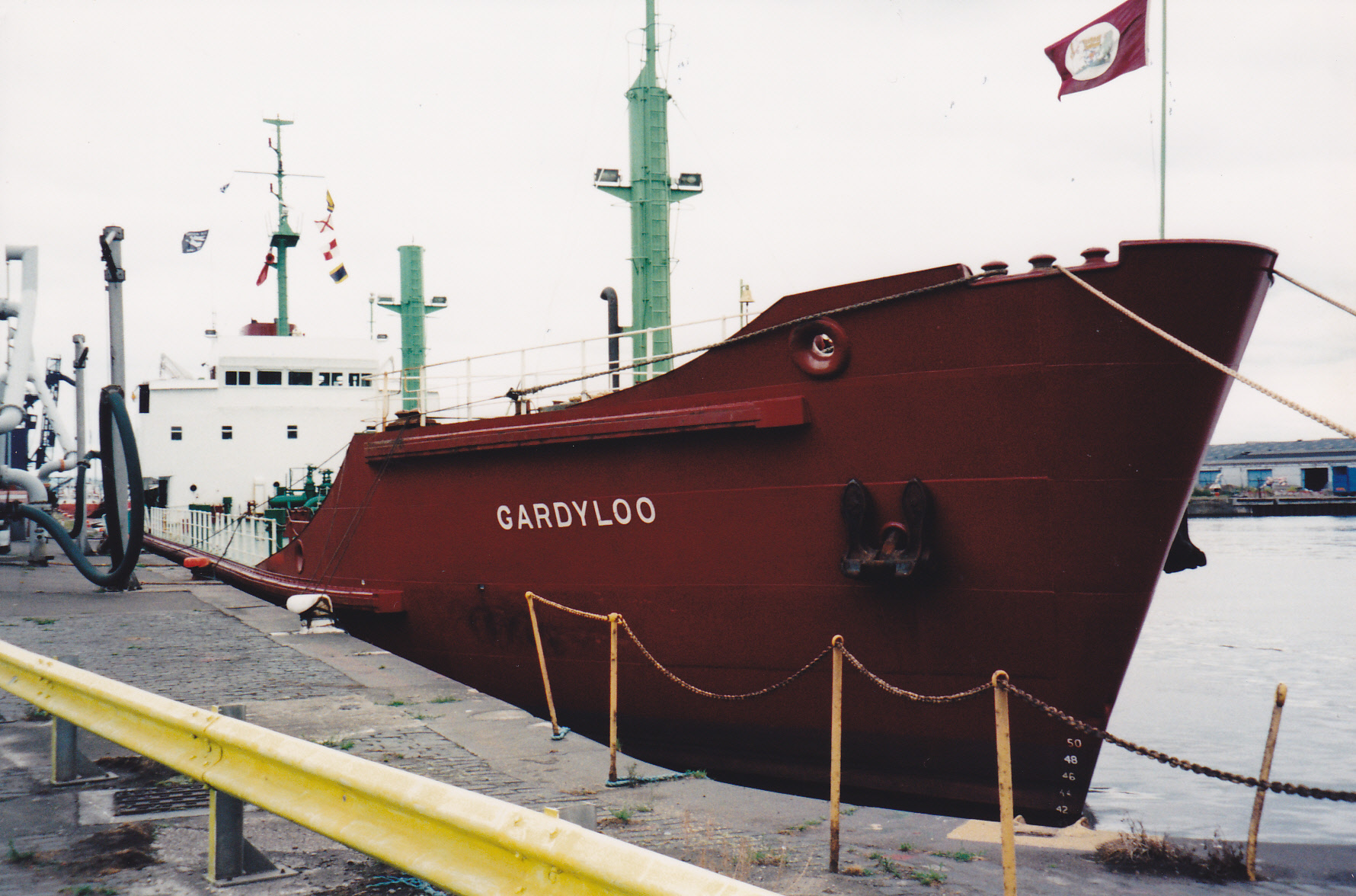
- Gardyloo in Leith Docks

History

United Kingdom
- Name: 1976–2001: Gardyloo; 2001–2004: Delta Tank; 2004–ongoing: Shollar
- Owner: 1976–1996 Lothian Regional Council; 1996–1999 East of Scotland Water Authority; 1999–2001 Whittaker Tanker Co Ltd, Hull (via Unibros Shipping Corp.); 2001–2004 Delta Tank Shipping Ltd; 2004–ongoing Azerbaijan Caspian Shipping Co., Baku
- Builder: Ferguson Brothers (Port Glasgow) Ltd., Port Glasgow
- Yard number: 471
- Launched: 4 February 1976
- Commissioned: 28 August 1976
- Identification: IMO number: 7427180

General characteristics
- Length: 85.88 m (281.8 ft) LOA
- Beam: 14.23 m (46.7 ft)
- Depth: 4.71 m (15.5 ft)
- Installed power: 1,898 brake horsepower (1,415 kW) 16-cylinder diesel engine by Mirrlees Blackstone
- Propulsion: single-screw
- Speed: 12 knots (22 km/h; 14 mph)

MV Gardyloo was a specially designed sewage dumping vessel that operated from Leith, the port of Edinburgh, between 1978 and 1998. Prior to 1978, the city of Edinburgh's waste was discharged into the Forth from a series of eight outlets along the coastline, where it often washed back up on beaches and rocks. The vessel took her name from the word "gardyloo", which was historically used by the burghers of Edinburgh to warn passersby that they were about to dump waste water into the street below.

== Construction and description ==
Built at a cost of £1.87 million by Ferguson Brothers in Port Glasgow, Gardyloo's task was to remove Edinburgh's sludge waste for disposal in two spots in the North Sea. The ship was launched on 4 February 1976 and was registered as a British ship with Official Number 366470 on 29 August in the same year. Later Gardyloo was allocated IMO Number 7427180 as its permanent identity.

Gardyloo was 85.9 m (281.8 ft) LOA and (80.0 m (262.5 ft) LBP, with a beam of 14.23 m (46.7 ft) and depth of 4.71 m (15.5 ft). She was propelled by a Mirrlees Blackstone 16-cylinder diesel engine, made at Stamford, Lincolnshire, driving a single screw. Developing 1,898 brake horsepower (1,415 kW), it could propel the ship at 12 knots (22 km/h).

== Sewage service ==
The ship did not go immediately into service from Leith, but was first chartered to Strathclyde Regional Council for a year from October 1976 as a replacement for their sludge vessel Shieldhall.

Beginning in 1978, Gardyloo made her sewage dumping trip up to three times a week, leaving Leith Docks at 8am to release her cargo at a spot close to the Bell Rock from May until October, and off St Abbs from October to May. She returned to Leith Docks around 6pm. In more than 2600 voyages, the MV Gardyloo dumped 8.5 million tonnes of sewage. The trip was open to the public, and during the 21 years of her operation, Gardyloo carried 6000 passengers.

This practice ceased at the end of 1998, when dumping was banned by the European Union's Urban Waste Water Treatment Directive, and Seafield Waste Water Treatment Works was extended to perform secondary treatment on the sewage, after which it went to a landfill site.

== Tanker service ==
After being laid up at Hull, Gardyloo was sold to Unilink Group in London, then to Whittaker Tanker Co., and then to Delta Tank Shipping Ltd, who renamed her Delta Tank. In 2004, she was sold to the state shipping enterprise Azerbaijan Caspian Shipping of Baku. Since 2006, she has been managed by Meridian Shipping & Management LLC, Baku, as the water carrier Shollar.
