= Mavis Grant =

British teacher (born 1948)

Dame Mavis Grant
- Born: Mavis Edgar; 1 February 1948 (age 78)
- Education: Northumberland College of Education
- Occupation: Teacher

Dame Mavis Grant, DBE (née Edgar; born 1 February 1948) is a retired British teacher.

== Personal life ==
Born in 1948 to Joseph S. Edgar and his wife, Edna M. (née Hewson), she married Roger M. Grant in 1970. She attended the Northumberland College of Education and received a Certificate of Education and an Advanced Certificate in Education Studies. She began her teaching career in 1969; in 1978, she became Deputy Headteacher at Cowgate Primary School in Newcastle upon Tyne. In 1984, she moved to the city's Mary Trevelyan Primary School as head teacher, serving until 1999, when she took up the same role at Newcastle's Canning Street Primary School.

== Career ==
Grant campaigned for security measures and protection in schools for teachers and students, and panic buttons (for summoning police) were installed in nearly all 120 schools in Newcastle. The campaign was prompted by an incident where Grant was assaulted by the mother of a pupil in 1991, who objected to a letter she had received regarding the student's behaviour. The assault resulted in a prosecution and suspended sentence.

In March 1994, she highlighted the importance of mutual respect in managing students, and noted concerns around budget cuts and limited student access to educational psychologists. Grant retired from teaching in 2008.

== Recognition ==
In 1998, the Mary Trevelyan Primary School trialed a new project as part of the national literacy strategy, organised by Education Secretary David Blunkett. The school scored a dramatic improvement in reading standards, and Grant was singled out for her good leadership in the initiative. In January 1999, she said it was the most successful project during her time at the school, and in February that same year, Ofsted named it as one of England's "most-improved schools".

In 1999, she was appointed a Dame Commander of the Order of the British Empire "for services to education". Her DBE was recognition for her work as head teacher at Mary Trevelyan Primary School, which was situated in a deprived area of Newcastle; 88% of its pupils were entitled to free school meals. The appointment also recognised her work as a government adviser policy and curriculum matters, including a curriculum review on teaching citizenship. She was also appointed by the Department for Education to an independent inquiry into the marking of the 1999 SATs tests for 11-year-olds.
