= Margaret Elliott =

Margaret Elliott, CBE (née Trainor; born 20 March 1951) is a Northern Irish solicitor and businesswoman.

== Early life and family ==
Elliott was born on 20 March 1951, the daughter of Malachy and Kathleen Trainor. In 1973, she married Acheson Elliott and has two sons and one daughter.

== Career ==
Elliott graduated from Queen's University Belfast with a law degree (LLB) in 1973 and has been practising as a private solicitor in Northern Ireland since 1976. As of 2017, she is a senior partner in the Newry-based law firm Elliott Trainor Partnership.

Elliott served as president of the Law Society of Northern Ireland for the year 1989–90. The following legal year, she was Chairman of Legal Aid Northern Ireland. Outside of the legal sphere, she has been Non-executive Director at Ulsterbus, Northern Bank, National Irish Bank, Oaklee Housing Association and the Irish Times (of which she is also a governor). She was a Fair Employment Commissioner between 1993 and 1996, a Civil Service Commissioner from 1995 to 2006, and Chairman of the Trustees of National Museums and Galleries Northern Ireland for ten years (1998–2008). In 1999, she was appointed Commander of the Order of the British Empire (CBE) for "services to business".
