= Don Filleul =

Jersey politician

Donald George Filleul OBE (24 February 1926 – 20 March 2016) was a Jersey politician. He served as a member of the States of Jersey for Saint Helier No. 1 from 1978 until 1987. He also served as the president of the Public Works Committee, which since became the Department for Infrastructure, a government department. Filleul oversaw the creation of the Queen's Valley Reservoir, as well as other improvements to the islands' infrastructure, during his tenure.

Outside of government, Filleul was also the former chairman of the Jersey Heritage, an independent charitable trust which oversees Jersey's museums and historic sites, as well as the chairman of the Waterfront Enterprise Board, now known as the Jersey Development Company. Filleul was named an Officer of the Most Excellent Order of the British Empire (OBE) for his service to the Jersey Trust.

Filleul was born in 1926 at Grève d'Azette, Jersey. He died at the Jersey Hospice in Saint Helier on 20 March 2016.
