= 1998 Birthday Honours =

British government recognitions

Queen's Birthday Honours are announced on or around the date of the Queen's Official Birthday in the United Kingdom and some Commonwealth countries. The dates vary, both from year to year and from country to country. All are published in supplements to the London Gazette and many are conferred by the monarch (or her representative) some time after the date of the announcement, particularly for those service people on active duty.

The 1998 Queen's Birthday honours were announced on 12 June 1998 for the United Kingdom and on 1 June 1998 for New Zealand.

Recipients of honours are shown below as they were styled before their new honour.

== United Kingdom ==
=== Life Peers ===
==== Baroness ====
- The Reverend Kathleen Margaret Richardson, O.B.E., Moderator, Free Churches' Council.

==== Barons ====
- Sir Terence Burns, G.C.B., Permanent Secretary, H.M. Treasury.
- Sir David English, Editor in Chief and Chairman, Associated Newspapers, Chairman, ITN and President of the Commonwealth Press Union (died before taking his seat in the House of Lords).
- Sir William Herbert Laming, C.B.E., Chief Inspector, Social Services Inspectorate, Department of Health.
- Sir Colin Marsh Marshall, Chairman, British Airways.

=== Privy Counsellor ===
- John Henry, Baron Harris of Greenwich, Liberal Democrat Chief Whip, House of Lords.

=== Knights Bachelor ===
- Malcolm Rowland Bates. For services to Industry.
- John Birt, Director-General, BBC. For services to Broadcasting.
- Michael Francis Bonallack, O.B.E., Secretary, The Royal and Ancient Golf Club of St Andrews. For services to Golf.
- Edmund John Phillip Browne, Group Chief Executive, British Petroleum, for services to the Oil and Gas Industries
- Professor Philip Cohen, F.R.S., Director, MRC Protein Phosphorylation Unit and Royal Society Research Professor at the University of Dundee. For services to Biochemistry.
- Robert George Cooper, C.B.E. For services to Equal Opportunities.
- John Eliot Gardiner, C.B.E., Conductor. For services to Music.
- Professor Charles Frederick George, Professor of Clinical Pharmacology and Dean of Medicine, Health and Biological Sciences, University of Southampton. For services to Medicine and to Medical Education.
- Patrick John Gillam, Chairman, Standard Chartered Bank. For services to Industry.
- John Reginald Gorman, C.V.O., C.B.E., M.C., D.L., Chairman, Northern Ireland Forum for Political Dialogue.
- Professor Peter Geoffrey Hall. For services to the Town and Country Planning Association.
- Stuart Hampson, Chairman, John Lewis Partnership. For services to Retailing.
- David Hare, Playwright. For services to the Theatre.
- John Charles Hoddinott, C.B.E., Q.P.M., Chief Constable of Hampshire. For services to the Police and to the prevention of Crime.
- Ian Holm (Ian Holm Cuthbert), C.B.E., Actor. For services to Drama.
- Geoffrey Charles Hurst, M.B.E. For services to Association Football.
- Professor Brian Jarman, O.B.E., General Medical Practitioner and Professor of Primary Health Care, Imperial College School of Medicine, London. For services to General Practice.
- Robert Alan Langlands, Chief Executive, NHS Executive, Department of Health.
- Professor Elihu Lauterpacht, C.B.E., Q.C. For services to international law.
- Alexander Wiseman Macara, Chairman, Council of the British Medical Association. For services to the Medical Profession.
- Professor Netar Prakesh Mallick, Professor of Renal Medicine, University of Manchester and Consultant Nephrologist, Manchester Royal Infirmary. For services to Nephrology.
- Robert Malpas, C.B.E. For services to Industry and to Science and Technology.
- Robert William Roy McNulty, C.B.E. For services to Economic Development.
- Alexander Fraser Morrison, C.B.E., Chairman, Morrison Construction Group. For services to Highland and Islands Enterprise.
- John Clifford Mortimer, C.B.E., Q.C., Barrister and Playwright. For services to the Arts.
- Richard Everard Nichols, Lord Mayor of London. For services to the City of London.
- Robert William Salisbury, Headteacher, Garibaldi School, Mansfield, Nottinghamshire. For services to Education.
- Professor Nicholas John Shackleton, F.R.S., Director, Godwin Institute for Quaternary Research, Department of Earth Sciences, University of Cambridge. For services to the Earth Sciences.
- Professor David John Watson, Director, University of Brighton. For services to Higher Education.
- Peter Michael Williams, C.B.E., Chairman, Oxford Instruments pic. For services to Science and Technology.

=== Order of the Bath ===
==== Knight Grand Cross of the Order of the Bath (GCB) ====
- General Sir Jeremy John George Mackenzie, K.C.B., O.B.E., A.D.C. Gen., late Queen's Own Highlanders.

==== Dame Commander of the Order of the Bath (DCB) ====
- Valerie Patricia Marie, Mrs Strachan, C.B., Chairman, H.M. Board of Customs and Excise.

==== Knight Commander of the Order of the Bath (KCB) ====
Military Division

Royal Navy

- Vice Admiral Ian David Graham Garnett.

Army

- Lieutenant General Michael David Jackson, C.B., C.B.E., late The Parachute Regiment.

Civil Division

- Andrew Turnbull, C.B., C.V.O., Permanent Secretary, Department of the Environment, Transport and the Regions.

==== Companion of the Order of the Bath (CB) ====
Military Division

Royal Navy

- Rear Admiral Richard Thomas Ryder Phillips.
- Rear Admiral Paul Anthony Moseley Thomas.

Army

- Major General Karol John Drewienkiewicz, late Corps of Royal Engineers.
- Major General Nigel William Fairbairn Richards, O.B.E. (480385), late Royal Regiment of Artillery.
- Major General Martin Spencer White, C.B.E., late Royal Corps of Transport.

Royal Air Force

- Air Vice-Marshal Peter John Goddard, A.F.C., Royal Air Force.
- Air Vice-Marshal Michael Richard Jackson, Royal Air Force.

Civil Division

- David John Bell. For public service.
- Brian Bender, Head, European Secretariat, Cabinet Office.
- Charles Valentine Betts, lately Director General Submarines and Head of the Royal Corps of Naval Constructors, Ministry of Defence.
- David Charles Ross Heyhoe, lately Assistant Under Secretary (General Finance), Ministry of Defence.
- Mavis, Mrs McDonald, Director General, Housing, Construction and Countryside Regeneration, Department of the Environment, Transport and the Regions.
- Robert Stewart Parker, Parliamentary Counsel, Parliamentary Counsel Office.
- Miss Eileen Doris Rubery, Head, Protection of Health Division, Department of Health.
- Nicholas John Sanders, Director, School Curriculum Funding and Teachers, Department for Education and Employment.
- Sarah Jacqueline, Mrs Tyacke, Chief Executive, Public Record Office and Keeper of Public Records, Lord Chancellor's Department.
- Timothy Edward Hanson Walker, Director-General, Immigration and Nationality Directorate, Home Office.

=== Order of St Michael and St George ===
==== Knight Grand Cross of the Order of St Michael and St George (KCMG) ====
- David Francis Williamson, C.B., lately SecretaryGeneral, European Commission, Brussels.

==== Dame Commander of the Order of St Michael and St George (DCMG) ====
- Miss Maeve Geraldine Fort, C.M.G., British High Commissioner, Pretoria.

==== Knight Commander of the Order of St Michael and St George (KCMG) ====
- Andrew Fleming Green, C.M.G., H.M. Ambassador, Riyadh.
- Jeremy Quentin Greenstock, C.M.G., lately Deputy Under-Secretary of State, Foreign and Commonwealth Office.
- Professor Joseph Rotblat, C.B.E., F.R.S. For services to international understanding.

==== Companion of the Order of St Michael and St George (CMG) ====
- (Charles) Kerry Bagshaw, O.B.E., Counsellor, Foreign and Commonwealth Office.
- Andrew John Bennett, Chief Natural Resources Adviser, Department for International Development.
- David Derek Boothby, lately Department of Political Affairs, United Nations Secretariat, New York.
- John Bostock, Deputy Permanent Representative, UKREP Brussels.
- Ivor Hywel Duck, lately Director of Fisheries, Secretariat-General, Council of Ministers of the European Union.
- Simon Lawrence Gass, Counsellor, Foreign and Commonwealth Office.
- Alan Fletcher Goulty, H.M. Ambassador, Khartoum.
- John Western Greaves. For services to the Latin American Trade Advisory Group and to Export.
- Roger Dudley Hart, H.M. Ambassador, Luanda.
- Barbara Logan Hay, M.B.E., H.M. Ambassador, Tashkent.
- John Wynne Owen, M.B.E., Governor, Cayman Islands.
- Roy Stephen Reeve, H.M. Ambassador, Kiev.
- James Maxwell Cree Rollo, Chief Economic Adviser, Foreign and Commonwealth Office.
- James Michael Scott Whittell, O.B.E., European Union Policy Director, British Council.
- Zygmunt Jan Ansgary Tyszkiewicz. For services to the Union of Industrial and Employers' Confederations of Europe.

=== Royal Victorian Order ===
==== Knight Grand Cross of the Royal Victorian Order (GCVO) ====
- Sir Edward William Spencer Ford, K.C.B., K.C.V.O., E.R.D., Secretary and Registrar of the Order of Merit.

==== Knight Commander of the Royal Victorian Order (KCVO) ====
- Major General Michael Frederick Hobbs, C.B.E., lately Director of The Duke of Edinburgh's Award.
- William Richard Michael Oswald, C.V.O., Director of the Royal Studs.

==== Commander of the Royal Victorian Order (CVO) ====
- Thomas Kelman Fleming, O.B.E., Broadcaster.
- Sir Richard William George, Vice-Chairman, The Prince's Trust Action.
- Peter Llewellyn Gwynn-Jones, L.V.O., Garter Principal King of Arms.
- John Christopher Parsons, L.V.O., Deputy Keeper of the Privy Purse and Deputy Treasurer to The Queen.
- John Watt Wightman, C.B.E., R.D.*, W.S., Solicitor to The Queen in Scotland.
- Charles Frederick Woodhouse, Solicitor to The Duke of Edinburgh.
- Eric Arthur Worrall, lately Deputy Director of The Duke of Edinburgh's Award Scheme.

==== Lieutenant of the Royal Victorian Order (LVO) ====
- Joseph Cowell, M.V.O., Superintendent of the Royal Collection, Hampton Court Palace.
- Brian Neale Howell, Forestry Consultant to Sandringham Estate.
- Neil Robertson Hynd, Regional Director, Properties in Care, Historic Scotland.
- Sidney William Ricketts, Senior Veterinary Consultant to the Royal Studs.
- Samuel Humfrey Gaskell Twining, O.B.E. lately Honorary Treasurer, Royal Warrant Holders Association.
- Elizabeth Frances, Mrs Vyvyan, Lady in Waiting to The Princess Margaret, Countess of Snowdon.

==== Member of the Royal Victorian Order (MVO) ====
- Sergeant Roger Edward Best, Royalty Protection Department, Metropolitan Police.
- Gerald Arthur Caesar, J.P., lately Chairman, The Prince's Youth Business Trust, Lancashire.
- Lucy Mary Dove, Secretary to the Comptroller, Lord Chamberlain's Office.
- Ian Hardy, Information Systems Manager, Royal Household.
- Inspector William Maurice Harris, Royalty Protection Department, Metropolitan Police.
- Kevan Hunt, lately Chairman, The Prince's Youth Business Trust, Nottinghamshire.
- Audrey Margaret, Mrs Laing, Deputy Visitor Manager, Windsor Castle.
- Inspector Iain MacRae, Royalty Protection Department, Metropolitan Police.
- Lionel Thomas Mann, R.V.M. Royal Chef, Royal Household.
- Allen James Marshall, Superintendent's Assistant, Royal Mews, Buckingham Palace.
- Martin Francis McCartney, Operations Director, Town & County Catering.
- Corinne Albert, Mrs Norrad, Principal Secretary to the Lieutenant Governor of New Brunswick.
- George Chesterton Pindred, lately Regional Director, The Prince's Youth Business Trust, Yorkshire and Humberside.
- Chander Kanta, Mrs Sharma, Invoice Clerk, Property Services, Royal Household.
- Manon Bonner, Mrs Williams, Assistant Private Secretary to The Prince of Wales.

=== Royal Victorian Medal (RVM) ===
==== Bar to the Royal Victorian Medal (Silver) ====
- Eric Williams, R.V.M., Manager. Reprographic Unit, Royal Household.

==== Royal Victorian Medal (Silver) ====
- Robert Peter Ashworth, lately Senior Horological Conservator, Windsor Castle.
- Robin Victor Bunn, Royalty Protection Department, Metropolitan Police.
- David Charles Cattle, Assistant Superintendent of Parks, The Home Park, Windsor.
- Robert John Rogerson Chambers, Horse Box Driver, Royal Mews, Buckingham Palace.
- Alan Christian, Reprographic Operator, Royal Household.
- Phillip Raymond Cook, Senior Dining Room Assistant, Royal Household.
- John Alfred Dixon, Verger, The Royal Chapel, Windsor Great Park.
- Marcel Guilemette, Maitre d'hotel and Administrative Assistant, Office of the Lieutenant Governor of Quebec.
- Susan Bridgett Northbrook-Hine, Dining Room Assistant, Royal Household.
- Derek George Poole, Messenger, Buckingham Palace.
- Gerard Power, Gilder, Buckingham Palace.
- Roger Edward Standen, Foreman Basement Cleaner, Buckingham Palace.
- Brian William Stevens, lately Joiner, Royal Household.
- Constable James Clifford Stuttard, Royalty Protection Department, Metropolitan Police.
- Alan Edward Williams, lately Divisional Sergeant Major, Second Division, The Queen's Body Guard of the Yeomen of the Guard.

=== Companion of Honour (CH) ===
- Peter Stephen Paul Brook, C.B.E. For services to the theatre.

=== Order of the British Empire ===
==== Dame Commander of the Order of the British Empire (DBE) ====
- Professor Gillian Patricia Kempster Beer, King Edward VII Professor of English Literature and President, Clare Hall, University of Cambridge. For services to English Literature.
- Lorna May, Mrs Boreland Kelly, J.P., Chair of Governors, Lambeth College. For services to Education.
- (Betty) Janet Elizabeth Murray, Mrs Kershaw, President, Royal College of Nursing. For services to the Nursing Profession and to Nursing Education.
- Helen, Mrs Metcalf, Headteacher, Chiswick Community School, Hounslow. For services to Education.
- Gillian Frances, Mrs Oliver, Head Nurse and Director of Patient Services, Clatterbridge Centre for Oncology, Merseyside. For services to Health Care.
- Ruth, Lady Runciman, O.B.E., Chairman, Mental Health Act Commission. For services to Mentally Ill People.
- Veronica Evelyn, Mrs Sutherland, C.M.G., H.M. Ambassador, Dublin.

==== Knight Commander of the Order of the British Empire (KBE) ====
- Air Marshal Colin George Terry, C.B., O.B.E., Royal Air Force.

==== Commanders (CBE) ====
===== Military Division =====
- Commodore Peter Attwood Fish, Royal Navy.
- Commodore John James Hart, Royal Navy.
- Commodore Paul Douglas Stone, A.D.C., Royal Navy.
- Brigadier Richard Fenwick Baly (476453), late Royal Corps of Signals.
- Colonel John Goodsir, M.B.E. (484857), late Army Air Corps.
- Brigadier Ian Donald Tyndale McGill, A.D.C. (483968), late Corps of Royal Engineers.
- Colonel David Richard Danyers Willis (496210), late Royal Gurkha Rifles.
- Group Captain John Adrian Cosgrove, O.B.E., Royal Air Force.
- Group Captain Michael Christopher Heath, Royal Air Force.
- The Reverend John Shedden, Royal Air Force.

===== Civil Division =====
- David Allsop, Policy Manager, Department of Social Security.
- Linda Mary, Mrs. Ammon, Divisional Manager, Choice and Careers Division, Department for Education and Employment.
- Teresa Anne, Mrs. Baring. For services to the Voluntary Sector.
- Peter Edward Barr, Chairman, Hazlewood Foods pic. For services to the Food Industry.
- Walter James Scott Batho, Chairman, London and Quadrant Housing Trust. For services to Social Housing.
- David Christopher Beeton, Chief Executive, Historic Royal Palaces.
- Moira Elizabeth Black, Chairman, English Advisory Committee on Telecommunications. For services to Consumers and to Health Care.
- Professor Keith Boddy, O.B.E. For services to the NHS and to Radioactive Waste Management.
- Professor Vernon Bernard Bogdanor. For services to Constitutional History.
- Lillian Gertrude Browse. For services to the Visual Arts.
- Christopher Bruce, Artistic Director, Rambert Dance Company. For services to Dance.
- Marion Phyllis Bull, O.B.E., Chief Nursing Officer, Welsh Office.
- Jean Margaret Caines (Mrs. Gaffin), lately Director of Information, Department of Trade and Industry.
- Anthony Thomas Coe, Q.P.M., Chief Constable, Suffolk Constabulary. For services to the Police.
- Stephen Colling, Headteacher, Bowland High School, Lancashire. For services to Education.
- June Madge, Mrs. Crown, President, Faculty of Public Health Medicine. For services to Public Health.
- Brian George Dawbarn, Head, Information Technology Division, H.M. Board of Customs and Excise.
- Scott Jamieson Dobbie. For services to Financial Regulation.
- George Graham Downing. For services to the Royal British Legion.
- Thomas James Ellis, Chairman and Chief Executive. Seeboard pic. For services to the Electricity Industry.
- Matthew Evans, Chairman, Library and Information Commission. For services to Librarianship and Information Provision.
- Michael John Finnigan, lately Chief Executive, Farming and Rural Conservation Agency, Ministry of Agriculture, Fisheries and Food.
- Peter John Ford, former Chairman, London Regional Transport. For services to Public Transport in London.
- Gavin John Norman Gemmell, Joint Senior Partner, Baillie Gifford & Co. For services to the Finance Industry.
- Stephen Glaister. For services to Public Transport.
- Edwin John Glasgow, Q.C. For services to the Financial Reporting Review Panel.
- Victoria Glendinning, Writer. For services to Literature.
- John Arthur Cadas Godfrey, Chairman, British Pig Association and Farm Assured British Pigs. For services to the Pig Industry.
- Geoffrey George Goodman. For services to Journalism and to the Newspaper Industry.
- Piers William Gough. For services to Architecture.
- Professor Rodney Grahame. For services to the Disability Living Allowance Advisory Board and to Disabled People.
- The Reverend Canon Donald Clifford Gray, T.D., Canon of Westminster and Rector of St. Margaret's, Westminster Abbey. For services to the Speaker of the House of Commons.
- John Armstrong Muir Gray, Director of Research and Development, Anglia and Oxford Region, NHS Executive, Department of Health.
- Professor Jack Donald Hardcastle, Professor of Surgery, University of Nottingham. For services to Surgery.
- Major William Richard Hern, C.V.O. For services to Horse Racing.
- Professor Archibald Howie, F.R.S., Professor of Physics, University of Cambridge. For services to Electron Microscopy.
- Ann Francis, Mrs. Hubbard, Teacher, Reigate College, Surrey. For services to the promotion of Chemistry Education.
- Michael Hughes. For services to the Foresight Panels and to the Finance Industry.
- Chris Humphries, Chief Executive, Training and Enterprise National Council. For services to Training.
- Deirdre Mary, Mrs. Hutton, Chairman, Scottish Consumer Council. For public service.
- Laurence Isaacson, Co-Founder and Deputy Chairman, Groupe Chez Gerard pic. For services to the Restaurant Trade and to Tourism.
- Steven John Isserlis, Cellist. For services to Music.
- John Jameson, Q.F.S.M., Firemaster, Strathclyde Fire Brigade. For services to the Fire Service.
- John Leckie Jamieson, Solicitor, Scottish Office.
- Schuyler Jones. For services to the Pitt Rivers Museum, Oxford University, Oxford.
- Trefor Glyn Jones, O.B.E., D.L., Chief Executive, Pilkington Optronics. For services to the Defence Industry and to the community in Clwyd.
- Robert Kee, Author and Broadcaster.
- Professor Harry Keen. For services to the British Diabetic Association and to the NHS Support Federation.
- Ronald James Kerr, Regional Director, North Thames Regional Office, NHS Executive, Department of Health.
- Professor Thomas Walter Bannerman Kibble, F.R.S., Professor of Theoretical Physics, Imperial College, London. For services to Physics.
- Richard Vincent Lawrence, Consultant, Missile Guidance, Defence Evaluation and Research Agency, Ministry of Defence.
- John Percival Leighfield, Chairman, Affiance of Information System Skills Group. For services to Training and Development.
- Professor Peter John Lillford, Principal Scientist, Unilever Research. For services to the Food Industry and to Science.
- Ian Lang Livingstone, O.B.E., Chairman, Lanarkshire Development Agency. For services to Business and to the Community and Health in Lanarkshire
- William Lowther, O.B.E, D.L., Director General UCB Films, UCB Films pic. For services to Industry and to the community in Cumbria.
- Bruce Anthony Malone, Headteacher, St. Andrew's Secondary School, Glasgow. For services to Education.
- Zahida Parveen, Mrs. Manzoor. For services to the Commission for Racial Equality and to Health Care.
- John Stephen Martin, Joint Managing Director, Martin Baker Aircraft Company Ltd. For services to the Defence Industry.
- Kevin McAleese, Headteacher, Harrogate Grammar School, North Yorkshire. For services to Education.
- William McCosh, Chairman, Guideline Careers and Guidance Services Ltd. For services to Training.
- Kevin Francis McCoy. For public service.
- Oonagh McDonald. For services to the Financial Services Authority and to Business.
- Sidney McDowell. For services to Industrial Relations and to Housing.
- Wilma Roy MacPherson, Director of Quality and Nursing, Guy's and St. Thomas' Hospital Trust, London. For services to Nursing.
- Rosemary Lee, Mrs. Melling, H.M. Chief Inspector, Magistrates' Courts Service Inspectorate, Lord Chancellor's Department.
- Peter Anthony Michael, Assistant Director, H.M. Board of Inland Revenue.
- George Henry Gardiner Mitchell, J.P., lately Chairman, Central Probation Council. For services to the Probation Service.
- Brigid, Mrs. Beattie-Moriarty, Headteacher, Burntwood Girls' School, Wandsworth. For services to Education.
- Richard Edward Morphet, Keeper Emeritus, Modern Collection, Tate Gallery.
- Professor Denis Noble, F.R.S., Burdon Sanderson Professor of Cardiovascular Physiology, University of Oxford. For services to Science.
- Barry Leslie Norman, Presenter, BBC Television. For services to Broadcasting and to the Film Industry.
- Peter James Peacock, Convenor, Highland Council. For services to Local Government.
- Professor Catherine Peckham, Professor of Paediatric Epidemiology, Institute of Child Health, University of London. For services to Medicine.
- Adrian Alexander Christian Phillips. For services to the Countryside and to the Environment.
- Rudolf Theodor Felix Plaut, O.B.E., Chairman, Techniquest. For services to Education and to Science.
- Fiona Claire Reynolds, lately Director, Council for the Protection of Rural England. For services to Agro-Environmental Policy and to Conservation.
- Stanley Stewart John Robertson, Chief Inspecting Officer of Railways, Health and Safety Executive, Department of the Environment, Transport and the Regions.
- Professor Charles Vaughan Ruckley, Professor of Vascular Surgery, University of Edinburgh. For services to Surgery.
- Eric Francis Shawyer, Chairman, the Baltic Exchange. For services to the Shipping Industry.
- Roger Martin Skiffins, lately Director, Broadcasting, Space and Radio Technologies, Department of Trade and Industry.
- William John Slater, O.B.E., President, British Gymnastics. For services to Gymnastics and to Sport.
- Anthony Patrick Smith, Chief Executive, English National Board for Nursing, Midwifery and Health Visiting. For services to Health Care.
- David John Harry Smith, Chief Executive Officer, Whatman plc. For services to Technology Transfer.
- Alastair Charles Dunbar Stuart. For services to the Defence, Press and Broadcasting Advisory Committee.
- David Edward Tagg, Group Services Director, DIAGEO pic. For services to Community Regeneration.
- Roy Taylor, Director of Community Services, Royal Borough of Kingston upon Thames, Surrey. For services to Social Services.
- John Paxton Toby, General Medical Practitioner. For services to Medicine and to The Royal College of General Practitioners.
- June Rosemary Whitfield, O.B.E., Actress. For services to Comedy Drama.
- John Wliiams, Headteacher, Pen-y-Dre High School, Merthyr Tydfil, South Wales. For services to Secondary School Education.
- Alistair James Wivell, Managing Director, Balfour Beatty Construction Ltd. For services to the Construction Industry.
- Robert Samuel Woof. For services to the Wordsworth Trust.
- Edward Michael Worley, Member, Black Country Development Corporation. For services to the Regeneration of the Black Country.

===== Diplomatic Service and Overseas List =====
- Donald Paul Montague Stewart Cape, C.M.G. For services to Anglo-Irish relations.
- Dr. Vernon Roy Dougall, O.B.E., Honorary legal adviser to H.M. Ambassador, Buenos Aires.
- Professor John Patrick Vaughan. For services to public health overseas.

==== Officers (OBE) ====
===== Military division =====
====== Navy ======
- Commander Campbell Donald de Burgh, Royal Navy.
- Commander John Howard James Gower, Royal Navy.
- Commander Laon Stuart Grant Hulme, Royal Navy.
- Commander Robert Edwin Laverty, Royal Navy.
- Commander Martin Duncan Macfarlan, Royal Naval Reserve.
- Commander Jonathan Mortimer Collingwood Maughan, L.V.O., Royal Navy.
- Commander Clive Sherrif Smith, Royal Navy.
- Lieutenant Colonel (Local Colonel) Matthew Sturman, Royal Marines.

====== Army ======
- Lieutenant Colonel David John Warwick Baylis (495134), The Royal Anglian Regiment.
- Lieutenant Colonel Desmond John Anthony Bergin (494397), Adjutant General's Corps (RMP).
- Colonel Malcolm George Braithwaite (494629), late Royal Army Medical Corps.
- Lieutenant Colonel Timothy John Checketts (502396), The Light Dragoons.
- Acting Colonel Robert Matthew Festing (486330), Northumbria Army Cadet Force.
- Lieutenant Colonel Anthony James Figg (487486), Adjutant General's Corps (RMP).
- Lieutenant Colonel Colin Anthony Mildinhall (489921), Corps of Royal Engineers.
- Lieutenant Colonel Christopher John Raymond Parker (520533), Royal Army Medical Corps.
- Lieutenant Colonel Philip Roy Wilkinson, M.B.E. (487603), Royal Regiment of Artillery.
- Lieutenant Colonel David Arnold Burch, E.D., The Bermuda Regiment.

====== Royal Air Force ======
- Wing Commander Feroze Fredoon Amroliwala (8023671T), Royal Air Force.
- Wing Commander Martin Terry Doel (5204500L), Royal Air Force.
- Wing Commander Wyn Griffith Evans (8021295H), Royal Air Force.
- Wing Commander Peter Richard Hunter, M.B.E. (8023198T), Royal Air Force.
- Wing Commander Gerald Alan Jermy (8090688T), Royal Air Force.
- Wing Commander Edward Gareth Jones (2622225K), Royal Air Force.
- Wing Commander Malcolm Hayes Jones (1949341N), Royal Air Force.
- Wing Commander Martin John Kilshaw, M.B.E. (5203342X), Royal Air Force.
- Wing Commander Richard Alan Laybourn, B.E.M. (0685549K), Royal Air Force.
- Wing Commander Robert Wilson Mayes (5203524B), Royal Air Force.
- Wing Commander Roy Anthony Pickerill (5202872J), Royal Air Force.

===== Civil Division =====
- Giles Coode-Adams. For services to the Foundation and Friends of the Royal Botanic Gardens, Kew.
- David Kim Hempleman-Adams, M.B.E. For services to Arctic Exploration.
- William Robert Ainsworth. For services to Architecture.
- Roger Aldridge, Executive Director, Marks and Spencer Pic. For services to Retail Development and Planning.
- Kay Andrews, Director, Education Extra. For services to Extra-Curricular Education.
- Raymond Anns, lately Grade 7, Court Fund Office, Lord Chancellor's Department.
- Ronald Grant Armstrong, lately Deputy Director-General, Building Societies Association. For services to the Building Society Movement.
- Professor Brian Arnold, J.P., Head of School of Science Education, Northern College; Aberdeen. For services to Teacher Training.
- Mary Margaret, Mrs. Arnold. For services to the Royal British Legion Women's Section.
- Robert Philip Avery, Principal Lecturer and Russian Interpreter, Ministry of Defence.
- James Ashleigh Baird. For public service.
- George Francis Barlow, Chief Executive, Peabody Trust. For services to Housing and Regeneration.
- Marcia Barton. For services to the Association of Chief Police Officers.
- Peter Readwin Batchelor. For services to the Home Office Vehicle Crime Prevention Group.
- Graham Monro Bates, J.P. For services to the community, especially Scouting and charities, in Bedfordshire.
- Thelma Dorothy Bates, Chairman, Health Committee, General Medical Council. For services to Medicine, especially Radiotherapy.
- Christopher Batt, Director, Leisure Services, Croydon Borough Council, Surrey. For services to Librarianship and Information Provision.
- Professor Seaton Hall Baxter. For services to Scottish Natural Heritage and to the Environment.
- Anthony Peter Bell, Director of Nursing and Joint Commissioning, Liverpool Health Authority. For services to Integrated Health Care.
- Graham Alexander Bennet, Q.P.M., Deputy Chief Constable, Fife Constabulary. For services to the Police.
- Michael Murray Bertioli, Group Engineering Director, Druck. For innovation in the Pressure Measurement Industry.
- Gaynor, Mrs. Bevan, Headteacher, Glasbury-on-Wye Primary School, Hereford. For improvements in School Standards.
- Beryl, Mrs. Beynon, Medical Director. For services to the Jacob's Well Appeal.
- Miss Jane Sophy Binyon, Head of Personnel Strategy, Policy and Guidance Unit, Health and Safety Executive, Department of the Environment, Transport and the Regions.
- Francis McCartney Blewett. For services to Conservation in Wiltshire.
- Robert John Giles Bloomer. For services to Rotherham Chamber of Commerce Training and Enterprise.
- Aubrey Bould, Technical Liaison Officer, Plant Varieties and Seeds Division, Ministry of Agrigulture, Fisheries and Food.
- John Allan Hyatt Box, Designer. For services to the Film Industry.
- Helen Mary, Mrs. Browning. For services to Organic Farming.
- Susan Ann, Mrs. Brownson. For services to the Retail Motor Industry Federation.
- David Lovell Burbidge, D.L. For services to the Coventry Cathedral Development Trust.
- James William Calderwood. For services to Orthopaedic Surgery.
- Egbert Sylvester Carless, Chair of Corporation, Handsworth College Group. For services to Education and to the community in Birmingham.
- Professor Marcella Anne Chamberlain. For services to Rheumatological Rehabilitation.
- Linford Christie, M.B.E. For services to Athletics.
- Professor Matthew Aitken Clark, Chief Executive, Broads Authority. For services to the Norfolk Broads and to National Park Development.
- Veronica Elsie Clayton, Professor of Music. For services to the Royal Military School of Music.
- Betty Enid, Mrs. Codona. For services to Women's Basketball.
- John Warren Coleman. For services to Local Government and to Economic Development in Wales.
- Elaine Davies Cooper, Section Head, SC6, Department of Health.
- Jean Courtney, Head of Office, H.M. Board of Inland Revenue.
- Thomas James Craig. For services to the Police.
- Lincoln Crawford. For services to the Independent Adoption Service and to Community Relations.
- Peter Lewis-Crown. For services to the Fashion Industry and for charitable services.
- David Hughes Davies, D.L., Chairman, Sir Geraint Evans Wales Heart Research Institute Appeal. For services to the community in Wales.
- Pauline Winifred, Mrs. Davies, Range 11, Department of Trade and Industry.
- Sandra, Mrs. Davies, Headteacher, Ogmore Comprehensive School, South Wales. For services to Education.
- Brian Kingsley Davison, Field Archaeologist and Senior Inspector of Historic Properties, South West Region, English Heritage.
- Hugh Donagher, Assistant Chief Investigation Officer, H.M. Board of Customs and Excise.
- Peter James Downes, Education Consultant; Former President, Secondary Heads' Association. For services to Language Teaching and to Educational Management.
- Muriel Patricia Turner-Downs. For services to the Civil Service Appeal Board and to Personnel Management.
- Geoffrey Stuart Duncan. For services to the Board of Education of the General Synod of the Church of England.
- George Duncanson, Managing Director, G.E. Aircraft Engine Services Ltd. For services to Industry and to Employment in Wales.
- Diana Rosemary, Mrs. Dunstan, Director, Research Management, Medical Research Council. For services to Scientific Research.
- Clive Dutton, Head of Regeneration, Sandwell Metropolitan Borough Council. For services to the Regeneration of the West Midlands.
- Leonard Lloyd Duvall, Leader, London Borough of Greenwich. For services to Local Government in London and to the Thames Gateway Partnership.
- John Alfred Eden, Director and General Manager Operations, Vickers Bridging. For services to the Bridging The Nineties project.
- Judy Frances Edwards, Headteacher, Grove Park Special School, Brent. For services to Special Education.
- John Duguid Kethro Ekins, County Surveyor, Hampshire County Council. For services to Transport and to Road Management Partnership in Hampshire.
- Howard Norman Embleton, Forest District Manager, West Argyll Forest District, Forestry Commission.
- Christopher English. For services to The Silver Trust and to charities.
- Peter John Enoch, lately General Medical Practitioner, Derbyshire. For services to Medicine.
- Sir Geoffrey Frederick Errington, Bt., lately Chairman, APA Community Drug and Alcohol Initiatives. For services to the Prevention of Drug Misuse.
- William John Farquhar, Secretary, Clinical Resource and Audit Group, NHS in Scotland. For services to Clinical Effectiveness in Health Care.
- Michael Glenn Fell, Manager, Port of Hull. For services to the Port Industry and to Industry in Humberside.
- Iain Montgomery Fender, Grade 6, Ministry of Defence.
- Susan Margaret, Mrs. Fey. For services to Business Links in London.
- Julian Filochowski. For services to International Development.
- Niall Diarmid Campbell Finlayson, Consultant Physician, Royal Infirmary of Edinburgh. For services to Medicine.
- William John Flanagan, Leader, Chesterfield Borough Council. For services to the community in Chesterfield, Derbyshire.
- Peter Fletcher, Headteacher, Easingwold School, North Yorkshire. For services to Education.
- Paul Lawrence Fleury, Grade 7, Ministry of Defence.
- Brian Footitt, Director of Nursing Development, South Tees Acute Hospitals NHS Trust. For services to Health Care.
- John Anthony Ford. For services to the Crafts.
- Bruce Forsyth (Bruce Joseph Forsyth-Johnson). For services to Entertainment.
- John Derek Freeborn, lately Deputy Director, Royal Air Force Museum. For services to Museums.
- William Gent, Clinical Director, Nursing, Mental Health and Learning Disability Services, Central Scotland Healthcare NHS. For services to Health Care for People with Learning Difficulties.
- Anne, Mrs. Gibson, National Secretary (Political), Manufacturing, Science and Finance Union. For services to Employee Relations and to Equal Opportunities.
- Lieutenant Colonel Peter Hempson Gill (Ret'd), lately Director, Builders Merchants' Federation. For services to the Construction Industry and to Training.
- Robert Hereward Glendinning, Pro-Chancellor and lately Chairman, Board of Governors, University of the West of England. For services to Further and Higher Education.
- Jeffrey Goddard, Chief Buckinghamshire Fire and Rescue Service. For services to the Fire Service.
- John Thomas Golding, Managing Director, Hewlett-Packard Ltd. For services to Quality in Business.
- Anthony Stewart Goldstone, M.B.E., D.L. For services to the North West Tourist Board.
- William John Goldsworthy. For services to the National Farmers' Union.
- Susan Irene, Mrs. Gompels, Principal, SI Gompels and Co. For services to Women in the Accountancy Profession.
- Ronald Lionel Gottlieb, Chairman, Norwood Ravenswood. For services to People with Learning Disabilities.
- Howard Gracey. For services to the Church of England Pensions Board.
- Aileen Graham. For services to Education.
- David Alexander Graham. For services to the Dairy Industry.
- Lieutenant Colonel Charles Robert Douglas Gray. For services to the Indian Cavalry Officers' Association.
- James Niall Stevenson Green, General Medical Practitioner. For services to Medicine.
- Mavis Ann, Mrs. Green, Customer Service Adviser, H.M.Board of Inland Revenue.
- Marian Helen, Mrs. Greswell. For services to the British Red Cross Society in Somerset.
- Maldwyn Jones Griffith, Consultant in Trauma and Orthopaedic Surgery and Director, Surgical Services, Carmarthen and District NHS Trust. For services to Medicine.
- William John Guild, Member, Committee of Management, Royal National Lifeboat Institution. For services to the RNLI in Scotland.
- Sally Jane Janet Gunnell, M.B.E. For services to Athletics.
- David Stephen Haggett. For services to Business and to the community in the West Midlands.
- Carolyn, Mrs. Hardy. For services to the National Gardens Scheme and to the Royal Horticultural Society.
- Roy George Heape, lately Non Executive Director, National Savings Agency.
- Eric Norman Hegarty. For services to the Magistracy in Liverpool, Merseyside.
- Macdonald Henderson. For services to Badminton.
- Ian Roy Hepburn, Assistant Director Scientific Services and Queen's Assay Master, the Royal Mint.
- George Austin Hewitson. For public service.
- Anthony Paull Maitland Hewson. For services to Disabled People especially through SCOPE.
- Professor Frederick Alan Hibbert, Director of Academic Quality, Southampton Institute of Higher Education. For services to Biology and to Higher Education.
- John Bonar Holmes Hill. For services to Further and Higher Education.
- Joseph Anthony Hillis, Director of Nursing and Operational Services, Reaside Clinic, Birmingham. For services to Health Care.
- Thomas Arnold Hollobone, Secretary, International Marine Contractors Association and Association of Diving Contractors. For services to Health and Safety in the Diving Industry.
- Prudence Margaret, Mrs. Hopkinson, J.P., D.L. For services to the Magistracy and to the Prison service in West Sussex.
- Ian Hunter. For services to Optometry and to Patient Eye Care.
- Thomas Drummond Hunter, Director, Howard League for Penal Reform (Scotland) Chairman, Disability Scotland; Scottish Institute of Human Relations; Child Psychotherapy Trust, Scotland. For services to the community.
- Edward Oliver Inman, Director, Duxford Airfield, Imperial War Museum. For services to Aviation History.
- Elspeth Virginia Insch, Head, King Edward VI Handsworth School, Birmingham. For services to Education.
- Christopher Beaven Irwin. For services to Forestry, the Timber Growers' Association and to the Environment.
- Timothy William Jackson, Director Commercial Affairs, The Scotch Whisky Association. For services to Export.
- Alfred Frank Jennings, Governor 1, H.M. Prison Kirkham, Prison Service, Home Office.
- James Jennings, J.P., Member, North Ayrshire Council. For services to Local Government.
- David Andrew Jessop, Executive Director, West India Committee. For services to Anglo/Caribbean Relations.
- David Edryd John. Principal Housing and Planning Inspector, The Planning Inspectorate, Department of the Environment, Transport and the Regions.
- James McKenzie Carrie Johnstone, Director of Capital Investment, North of Scotland Water Authority. For services to Water Management.
- Professor Ronald Samuel Jones, J.P., Professor, Veterinary Anaesthesia, University of Liverpool. For services to Veterinary Medicine.
- Sandi Yvonne, Mrs. Rhys Jones. For services to the Promotion of Opportunities for Women in the Construction Industry.
- Lionel Roderic Joyce, Chief Executive, Newcastle City Health NHS Trust. For services to Health Care.
- Stefan George Kay, Managing Director, Inveresk pic. For services to the Paper Industry and to Export.
- John Richard Ernest Finn-Kelcey. For services to the community, especially the Chamber of Commerce and Industry, in Ashford, Kent.
- Ronald Edward Killey. For services to the Commonwealth Games Federation and to Young People on the Isle of Man.
- Colin Herbert Kime, Officer in Charge, H.M. Board of Inland Revenue.
- Robert John King, Chief Fire Officer, Hertfordshire Fire and Rescue Service. For services to the Fire Service.
- William Stanley Kirby, Visual Impairment Consultant. For services to Museums and Galleries.
- William Brown Kirkpatrick, J.P. For services to the Gaming Board for Great Britain.
- Alan Paul Knight, Environmental Policy Controller B&Q. For services to Environmental Audit in Business.
- Peter Lambert, Assistant Director, Aeroengines and Export Promotion, Department of Trade and Industry.
- Barry Leathwood, National Secretary, Rural Agricultural and Allied Workers' Trade Group TGWU. For services to the Agricultural Wages Board.
- Wing Commander John Merritt Lewington, RAFVR (Retd.). For services to the Air Training Corps, North Region.
- Robert Hugh Lilley. For services to Journalism.
- Stephen Locke. For services to County Museum and Galleries Services.
- Professor Susan Mary Lyons, Managing Director, Rolls-Royce Military Aero Engines Ltd. For services to Aero Engineering.
- Professor David William Mackay, Director, North Region, Scottish Environment Protection Agency. For services to Environment Protection.
- Christopher John Frank Madden, Executive Director, British In Vitro Diagnostics Association. For services to the Diagnostics Iridustry.
- Professor Michael Edward Mallet, Professor of History, University of Warwick. For services to the History of Renaissance Italy.
- Neil Forbes Massie, Farmer. For services to Aberdeen Angus and Charolais Livestock Breeding.
- Ann Matheson, Keeper, Department of Printed Books. For services to The National Library of Scotland.
- Professor George Dunlop Matheson, lately Director, Transport Research Laboratory (Scotland). For services to Geotechnical Engineering.
- Patricia, Mrs. Mayhew, Grade 6, Home Office.
- Grainne, Mrs. McCafferty. For services to Secondary Education.
- Rosemary Faith McCall. For services to the Link Centre and to care for Deaf People.
- Alan David McClure, D.L. For services to the Medical Packaging Industry and the community.
- Madeleine McDonagh, Manager, National Environmental Technology Centre, AEA Technology pic. For services to Oilspill Research.
- David Fergus McDonough. For services to the community, especially Disabled People, in London, and to the Medical Charities.
- Cynthia, Mrs. McDougall, Grade 5, Home Office.
- Thomas Joseph McGrenary, Principal, Cumbernauld College. For services to Further Education.
- Michael Noel McKenna, Director of Submarines of Babcock Rosyth Defence Limited. For services to Ship Engineering.
- John Francis McManus, Headteacher, Tyldesley Highfield School, Wigan. For services to Education.
- Elizabeth Matilda McNair. For services to the re-organisation of Nursing, Midwifery and Health Visiting Training and to Nursing Quality.
- Mervyn McQuillan. For services to the Housing Association Movement and to Housing Provision.
- Michael George Mecham, Deputy Director, South America Trade Promotion, Department of Trade and Industry.
- David John Mellish, Q.P.M., Acting Chief Constable, Northumbria Constabulary. For services to the Police
- Robert Middleton, Member, Aberdeen City Council. For services to Local Government.
- Professor John Morton Midgley. For services to the British Pharmacopoeia Commission and to Regulatory Medicine.
- Graham Douglas Naismith Miller. For services to the Transport Industry and to the Freight Transport Association.
- Cherrill Rosemary, Mrs. Milne. For services to the Army Families' Federation.
- Eileen, Mrs. Mitchell. For services to the Scottish Refugee Council and to the Refugee Action Council.
- James Harkness Moffat. For services to Business and to the Community in Ayrshire.
- James Antony Axel Herring Moore. For services to the Fulbright Commission and to International Fellowship Programmes.
- Colonel Geoffrey Charles Purday Morgan, D.L. For services to the Army Benevolent Fund and to the community in Essex.
- Professor John Morton, Director, Medical Research Council Cognitive Development Unit. For services to Psychology and to Child Development.
- Clare Mulholland, lately Deputy Chief Executive, ITC. For services to Broadcasting.
- Noel, Mrs. Murray. For services to the Soldiers', Sailors' and Airmen's Families Association.
- Stanley Livingston Nelson, District Manager, Employment Service, Department for Education and Employment.
- Agnes Alexandra Nicholl. For services to Young People.
- Michael Asian Norton, Founder, Directory of Social Change. For services to the Voluntary Sector.
- Richard John Nosowski, Headteacher, Backwell School, North Somerset. For services to Education.
- Arthur Offen, Head, Soft Traffic Policy Branch, Department of the Environment, Transport and the Regions.
- Stephen Robert Ogle, lately Executive Director Finance, Magnox Electric pic. For services to the Nuclear Industry.
- John Bruce Ollerhead, Chief Aircraft Noise Adviser, National Air Traffic Services. For services to Noise Abatement.
- David Harold Owen Owen, Registrar, Privy Council Office.
- Susan Elizabeth, Mrs. Owens. For services to Sustainable Development.
- Indira, Mrs. Patel. For services to Asian Women of Great Britain.
- Ian Douglas Peacock, lately Chief Executive, Lawn Tennis Association. For services to Lawn Tennis.
- John Peel (John Robert Parker Ravenscroft). For services to Radio Broadcasting and to Popular Music.
- Claire Perry, Chief Executive, Bromley Health Authority. For services to Health Care.
- Professor Clive Graham Perry, Festival Director, Pitlochry Festival Theatre. For services to Provincial Theatre.
- Sister Elena Regina Pettenuzzo. For services to Disabled Children and Adults, especially those with Epilepsy, in Hertfordshire.
- Leslie Samuel Phillips, Actor. For services to Drama.
- David Richard Peace Pickles, Chief Architect and Energy Manager, Newark and Sherwood District Council. For services to Energy Efficiency and to Sustainable Development in Housing.
- David Alan Powell, Grade 7, Welsh Office.
- Terence David John Pratchett, Author. For services to Literature.
- Iain Francis Harvey Purchase, Director, Zeneca Central Toxicology Laboratory. For services to Toxicology.
- John Leslie Quinn, Assistant Director, H.M. Board of Inland Revenue.
- Leslie David Reed, Composer. For services to Popular Music.
- John Jeremy Rendell, Chief Executive, UK Ecolabelling Board, Department of the Environment, Transport and the Regions.
- Anthony Arthur Reynolds. For services to the Construction Industry, Industrial Relations and for charitable services.
- Malcolm Leslie Rickson, Grade 6, Ministry of Defence.
- John Iwan Killin Roberts. For services to the Soldiers', Sailors' and Airmen's Families Association in Dyfed.
- Terence Piers Edward Rogers, Director of Housing and Sports Development, Corporation of London. For services to Housing and to Homeless People in London.
- Barry Michael Rose, lately Master of the Music, St. Alban's Abbey. For services to Church Music.
- John Francis Rowell, Head, Crime Prevention Unit, The Scottish Office.
- Archibald Donald Roy, Grade 6, Benefits Agency, Department of Social Security.
- Professor David Rye. For services to Nurse Education, Standards of Nursing Care and Training.
- Alexander Christer Edward Sandberg, Chairman, Messrs. Sandberg Consulting Engineers. For services to Civil Engineering.
- John George Saunders, Chief Executive, Business Link in Hereford and Worcester. For services to the Business Link Network.
- Leon Schaller. For services to the Jewish community and to Young People.
- David Haig Scott, Local Government Editor, The Scotsman. For services to Journalism.
- Peter John Seago, J.P. For services to the Administration of Justice.
- Paul Edward Gilbert Shattock. For services to People with Autism.
- Richard Joseph Shenton, Senior Senator, States of Jersey. For services to the community.
- John Lee Simpson, Managing Director, SERCO- I.A.L. Systems Ltd. For services to Export.
- Wayne Philip Colin Sleep. For services to Dance and Drama.
- Professor Stanley Desmond Smith, Chairman, Edinburgh Instruments Ltd. For services to Optoelectronics.
- Arthur Frederick Southgate, M.B.E. For services to the Royal British Legion in Dorset.
- Ian Peter Spratling, Managing Director, Wolff Steel Ltd. For services to the CBI and to Industry in Wales.
- Professor Brian William Staines, Member, Deer Commission for Scotland. For services to Wildlife Management.
- Patricia Ann, Mrs. Steane, Medical Director and Consultant Anaesthetist, Swansea NHS Trust. For services to Medicine.
- Richard Henry Simpson Stilgoe, President, Surrey Care Trust. For services to the community, especially Disabled People.
- Margaret Mary Stokes. For services to Health Care and to People with Special Needs in Devon.
- Alan Frederick Stroud. For services to the Institute of Road Transport Engineers.
- Alastair Menzies Struthers, Headteacher, Lochend Secondary School, Easterhouse, Glasgow. For services to Education.
- Peter Stubbs. For services to the Distributive Occupation Standards Council and to Employee Training.
- Professor William James Swindall. For services to Analytical Science and to the Environment.
- Philip John Sykes, Consultant Plastic Surgeon, Morriston Hospital, Swansea. For services to Medicine.
- Hazel Muriel, Mrs. Taylor, lately Nursing Director, Glan Hafren NHS Trust. For services to Nursing in Wales.
- The Reverend Michael Hugh Taylor. For services to Christian Aid.
- Norman Geoffrey Taylor, Assistant Collector, Fraud and Intelligence, H.M. Board of Customs and Excise.
- Christine, Mrs. Teesdale, City Challenge Manager, Hartlepool Borough Council. For services to the Regeneration of Hartlepool.
- Richard David Tobias, Chief Executive, British Incoming Tour Operators' Association. For services to Tourism.
- James Rendall Toller, Oasis IT Project Manager, H.M. Treasury.
- David Glyndwr Upshall, Grade 6, Defence Evaluation and Research Agency, Ministry of Defence.
- Melvin Usher, Chief Executive, South Somerset District Council. For services to Local Government and to the community in Somerset.
- Patricia Emily, Mrs. Verity. For services to the National Foster Care Association.
- Sarah, Mrs. Ward, lately Commissioner, Countryside Commission. For services to the Countryside, especially in Kent.
- Tony Ward. For services to Employee Relations and to the Commission for Racial Equality.
- Dorothy Anne, Mrs. Weaks, Community Psychiatric Nurse, Perth and Kinross NHS Trust. For services to Health Care.
- Rosemary Helena Weir. For services to Secondary Education.
- Graham West, Officer in Charge, H.M. Board of Inland Revenue.
- Margaret Elizabeth Joan, Mrs. Whiteside. For services to Consumer Affairs.
- Samuel Maurice Whitten. For public service.
- David Kenworthy Wilkinson, Director, 3i pic. For services to Business in Yorkshire and the Humber region.
- David Clive Harries Williams. For services to the community in Berkshire.
- Geoffrey Alistair Williams, Grade 6, Department for International Development.
- David Stewart Williamson. For services to the Citizens Advice Bureau in Edinburgh.
- Jane Morris Wilmot. For services to Transport for Deaf People.
- Alastair Mckinnon Wilson, Managing Director, Newcastle Breweries. For services to Tourism.
- Douglas Langton Woolf. For services to Arthritis Care.
- Talib Hussain Yaseen, Director of Nursing and Operational Services, Furness General Hospital, Cumbria. For services to Nursing Management and to Health Care.
- Alexander Yule. For services to Radiography and to Health Care.

===== Diplomatic Service and Overseas List =====
- John Gordon Bacon. For services to children's welfare in former Yugoslavia.
- Gillian, Mrs. Bennett, Head Historian, Foreign and Commonwealth Office.
- John Brinsden. For services to British business in Vietnam.
- Roger Hugh Brown, lately H.M. Consul-General, Sao Paulo.
- Monsignor Charles Vincent Burns. For services to British-Holy See relations.
- Anthony James Caston, lately European Commission, Brussels.
- Joseph Peter Docherty, lately Director, British Council, Sierra Leone.
- The Venerable Martin Paul Draper. For services to the Anglican Church and British community in France.
- Melih Huseyin Fereli. For services to British–Turkish cultural relations.
- Saul Morten Froomkin, Q.C. For public service, Bermuda.
- Rodney Michael Gallagher, Regional Financial Services Adviser, Caribbean Territories.
- Stephen Charles Goss. For services to British commercial interests in Venezuela.
- Peter William Hemmings. For services to opera overseas, latterly in Los Angeles.
- Christopher Barry Hudson. For welfare services to the British community, Riyadh.
- Derek Thynne Ingram, For services to Commonwealth journalism
- Leslie Edwin Jaques. For services to British-New Zealand trade.
- Rashid Kareh. For services to the United Nations Association.
- Walter Lessing. For services to international relations.
- Philip Mead. For services to the British oil industry, South America.
- Anthony Cecil Poole. For services to British commercial interests, Malta.
- Dr. Elizabeth Margaret Embree Posit. For services to medical research, The Gambia.
- Anthony Graham Quinlan. For services to British interests in the Middle East.
- Simon Robinson. For services to British-Slovenian relations.
- Miss Andrea Lester Rose, Director, Visual Arts, British Council.
- Professor John Simpson. For services to nuclear non-proliferation.
- Dennis Alan Taylor, M.B.E. For services to British Trade with Argentina.
- Richard John Walker, lately British Council, India.
- Heather Marguerite, Mrs. Weeks. For services to the Ditchley Foundation.
- Derrick Edwin Wells. For services to the power industry in developing countries.
- Anthony Arthur Carton Wood, First Secretary, Foreign and Commonwealth Office.
- Dr. Frank Woodhouse, lately Director, British Institute, Florence.

== Antigua and Barbuda ==
=== Order of the British Empire ===
==== Officer (OBE) ====
- Dr. Reginald Alford Walwyn. For public service.

=== British Empire Medal (BEM) ===
- George Bernard Fieulleteau. For public service.
- Cornelia, Mrs. Michael. For community service.

== Bahamas ==
=== Order of Saint Michael and Saint George ===
==== Companion (CMG) ====
- Hugh Gordon Sands. For services to the public and private sectors.

=== Order of the British Empire ===
==== Commander (CBE) ====
- Basil Trevor Kelly. For services to politics.
- Carleton Winston Williams. For services to economic and civic development.

==== Officer (OBE) ====
- Franklyn Augustus Butler. For services to business.
- George William Mackey. For services to politics.
- Dr. Myles Egbert Munroe. For services to religion.
- Noel Sawyer Roberts. For services to politics.

==== Member (MBE) ====
- Dr. Vernell Theresa Allen. For services to medicine.
- Miss Mary Barbara Brown. For services to youth.
- Zelma Ernestine, Mrs. Dean. For services to education.
- The Reverend Prince Albert Hepburn, J.P. For services to civic development.
- Dr. Michael Neville. For services to medicine.
- James Joseph Isaac Shepherd. For services to politics.

=== British Empire Medal (BEM) ===
- Evelyn Adassa, Mrs. Bootle-Babb. For services to nursing.
- James Randolph Bain. For services to civil and political development.
- Maria Gertrude, Mrs. Barry. For community service.
- Miss Suzanne Janet Black. For services to civic and economic development.
- The Reverend Alfred Neville Duresy Brown. For community service.
- William Marcus Bullard, J.P . For community service.
- Miss Paula Curry. For services to education.
- Inez Maria, Mrs. Ferguson-Peet. For services to education.
- Robert Lucien Stratton. For services to Abaco Island.

== Barbados ==
=== Knights Bachelor ===
- Michael Ronald Stoute. For promotion of sport tourism in Barbados.

=== Order of the British Empire ===
==== Commander (CBE) ====
- Ilene Adorah, Mrs. Murray-Aynsley. For services to nursing; and the disabled.
- Charles Lindsay Bolder. For services to politics.

==== Officer (OBE) ====
- Miss Beryl Emmeline Deane. For services to education.
- Captain Vernon Nathaniel Watson. For services to culture.

== Belize ==
=== Order of Saint Michael and Saint George ===
==== Dame Commander (DCMG) ====
- Elaine Madoline, Mrs. Middleton, M.B.E. For services to education and the community.

=== Order of the British Empire ===
==== Member (MBE) ====
- William Harrison Longsworth. For public service
- John Sosa, J.P. For community and public service.

== Cook Islands ==
=== Order of the British Empire ===
==== Member (MBE) ====
- Mataroa Potiki Mataroa. For services to the building industry.
- Tai Turia. For services to education and the community.

== Grenada ==
=== Order of the British Empire ===
==== Officer (OBE) ====
- Charles Arthur McIntyre. For services to commerce.

==== Member (MBE) ====
- Rupert Antoninus Williams. For services to Education.

=== British Empire Medal (BEM) ===
- Guy Osmond Archibald. For services to poultry farming.
- Norbert Grant. For services to sport.
- Daniel Hypolite. For services to farming.
- Denis Thomas. For services to sport.

== Papua New Guinea ==
=== Knights Commander (KBE) ===
- Sinaka Vakai Goava, C.B.E. For community service.

=== Commander (CBE) ===
Military Division

- Colonel Rauka Eric Ani, O.B.E. For services to Papua New Guinea Defence Force.

Civil Division

- Pastor Kuso Naseriu. For services to religion and the community.
- Kunjil Yano. For services to politics.

=== Officer (OBE) ===
Civil Division

- Titi Christian. For services to the community and politics.
- Mewie Launa, B.E.M. For services to the community and the coffee industry of Papua New Guinea.
- Nicholas Paul Nere. For services to and spiritual development in the community of Sandaun Province.
- Egi Raka, B.E.M. For community service.
- Colin Travertz. For public service.
- Mosi Yeahro. For services to medicine.

=== Member (MBE) ===
Military Division

- Warrant Officer Lesta Sori Manual. For services to Papua New Guinea Defence Force.
- Chief Warrant Officer Kini Kevin Rava. For services to Papua New Guinea Defence Force.

Civil Division

- Herman Halihu. For services to the community.
- Martin Jerry. For services to the community, religion and public service.
- Vina Hesaboda Joel. For services to the community and the Local District Court.
- Mek Korop. For services to local government and the community.
- Inus Lelenga. For services to sport, culture, public service and youth.
- Tau Nana. For services to the private sector.
- Anthony Patsik. For services to the community.
- Vaburi Rei. For public service.
- The Reverend Father Henry Toesch. For religious service.

=== Imperial Service Order (ISO) ===
- Pokut Narumbuai. For community service.

=== British Empire Medal (BEM) ===
- Raphael Appa. For services to the community and local district court.
- Wamil Atep. For community service.
- Sergeant Waine Bagme. For services to the Royal Papua New Guinea Constabulary and the community.
- Nakim Elei. For services to the community and politics.
- Geling Lot. For services to religion and the community.
- Idau Oala. For services to public service.
- Honekitang Serum. For services to teaching and the public service.
- Katy, Mrs. Tani. For community service.
- Bomiring, Mrs. Timbangu. For services to the Church and women's work.

=== Queen's Police Medal (QPM) ===
- Chief Superintendent Aloysius Eviaisa. For services to the Royal Papua New Guinea Constabulary.
- Superintendent Alfred Reu, M.B.E. For services to the Royal Papua New Guinea Constabulary.

== St Lucia ==
=== Order of Saint Michael and Saint George ===
==== Knight Commander (KCMG) ====
- George Frederick Lawrence Charles, C.B.E. For political service.

=== Order of the British Empire ===
==== Officer (OBE) ====
- Floresse Marie Muriel, Mrs. Gill. For services to education and the community.
- Jeanne Lusca Claribel, Mrs. Theophilus. For services education and the community.

==== Member (MBE) ====
- Evielle Philomena, Mrs Mauricette. For community service.
- Peter Hughlan St Rose. For community service.
- Willie Volney, B.E.M. Foor community service.

== Saint Vincent and the Grenadines ==
=== Order of Saint Michael and Saint George ===
==== Companion (CMG) ====
- Kingsley Cuthbert Augustine Layne. For public and foreign service.

=== Order of the British Empire ===
==== Member (MBE) ====
- Gloria Valma Cynthia, Mrs. Ballantyne. For services to sport.
- Miss Ulrica Estonella Williams. For community service.
- Miss Sylvia Vanetta Wilson. For community service.

== Solomon Islands ==
=== Order of the British Empire ===
==== Member (MBE) ====
- George Kejoa. For services to politics.

=== British Empire Medal (BEM) ===
- Macpherson Mwara. For services to nursing.
- John Tagabasoe. For services to nursing.
- Ngaire, Mrs. Ziudanga. For services to nursing.

=== Queen's Police Medal (QPM) ===
- Deputy Commissioner Morton Sireheti. For services to Solomon Islands' Police Force.
- Superintendent Ienikapo Tamoa, Director of Music, Solomon Islands' Police Force.

== Tuvalu ==
=== Order of the British Empire ===
==== Knights Commander (KBE) ====
- The Right Honourable Dr. Tomasi Puapua. For services to medicine, politics and the community.

==== Commander (CBE) ====
- The Honourable Dr. Alesana Kleis Seluka, M.B.E. For services to medicine, politics and the community.

==== Officer (OBE) ====
- Dr. Ifti Ahmed Ayaz, Honorary Consul General of Tuvalu in the United Kingdom.
- Saufatu Sopoanga. For services to the community and public service

==== Member (MBE) ====
- Nelesone Apelaamo. For services to the community and public service.
- Saitala Tusi. For services to meteorology and the community.

=== British Empire Medal (BEM) ===
- Tekinene Mataio. For services to public health, medicine and the community.
- Telesia Sogivalu. For services to the community and for public service.
- Tausegia Tafia. For community service.
