= Szamuely =

Szamuely is the surname of a Hungarian Jewish family. Among its members are

- Tibor Szamuely (1890–1919), a Bolshevik revolutionary
- Tibor Szamuely (historian) (1925–1972), his nephew
- George Szamuely, the younger Tibor Szamuely's son and noted anti-Communist columnist
