= Parveen Kumar =

Indian academic (born 1942)

Dame Parveen Kumar GBE
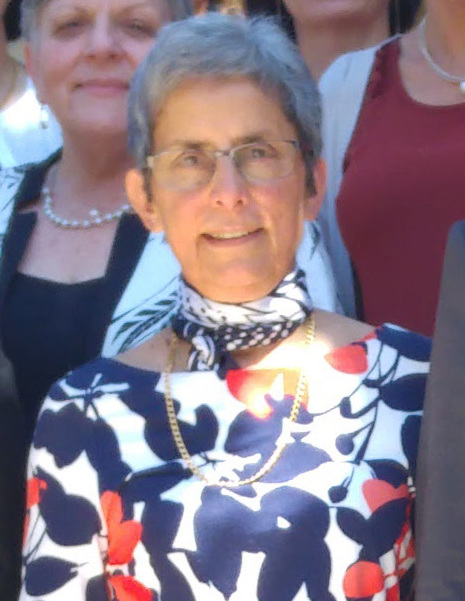
- Kumar in 2017
- Born: Parveen June Kumar; 1 June 1942 (age 84); Lahore, Punjab, British India
- Education: The Lawrence School, Sanawar
- Alma mater: St Bartholomew's Hospital Medical College
- Known for: President of the British Medical Association
- Awards: Dame Grand Cross of the Order of the British Empire
- Scientific career
- Fields: Medicine, Gastroenterology

Dame Parveen June Kumar GBE (born 1 June 1942) is a British-Indian doctor who is a Professor of Medicine and Education at Barts and The London School of Medicine and Dentistry. She worked in the NHS for over 40 years as a consultant gastroenterologist and physician at Barts and the London Hospitals and the Homerton University Hospital. She was the President of the British Medical Association in 2006, of the Royal Society of Medicine from 2010 to 2012, of the Medical Women's Federation from 2016 to 2018 and of the Royal Medical Benevolent Fund from 2013 to 2020. She was also Vice President of the Royal College of Physicians from 2003 to 2005. In addition, she was a founding non-executive director of the National Institute of Clinical Excellence, chaired the Medicines Commission UK until 2005, and also chaired the BUPA Foundation Charity for Research until 2013.

Kumar co-founded and co-edited Kumar and Clark's Clinical Medicine, which is now in its 10th edition, a standard medical textbook that is used around the world. She has also held several leadership roles in medical education. She set up the first MSc course in Gastroenterology in the UK and continues to teach, lecture and examine medical students and doctors across the globe. Apart from medical education, she is also very interested in global health and set up the Global Health Initiative at the Royal Society of Medicine when she was President.

Kumar was appointed Dame Grand Cross of the Most Excellent Order of the British Empire (GBE) in 2026, having been appointed Dame Commander (DBE) in 2017 and Commander (CBE) in 2000 of the same order. She was awarded the BMA Gold Medal in 2007. She was the first Asian Professional Woman of the Year in 1999. She also has several other honours and honorary degrees.

== Early life and education ==
Born in Lahore (then British India, now Pakistan), Kumar was initially educated in The Lawrence School, Sanawar in India. Kumar moved to the United Kingdom and studied medicine at St Bartholomew's Hospital Medical College, then training as a gastroenterologist under Sir Anthony Dawson and Michael Clark.

== Career ==
After qualifying, Kumar worked at St. Bartholomew's, Homerton University Hospital and the Royal London Hospital as a gastroenterologist. Specialising in small bowel diseases, such as coeliac disease, she was an elected member of the British Society of Gastroenterology's Council, and started the first gastroenterology MSc course in the UK. Interested in education, Kumar became academic sub-dean at Barts, then accepting the job of Director of Post-Graduate Medical Education. She co-founded and co-edited the textbook Clinical Medicine with Clark. Clinical Medicine is now a standard work and is used worldwide: the 11th edition was released in June 2025.

In 1999, Kumar was appointed a non-executive director of the National Institute of Clinical Excellence, resigning in 2002 following her appointment as Chairman of the Medicines Commission UK. In 2006 she became President of the British Medical Association, and in 2010 was appointed President of the Royal Society of Medicine. She served as Vice-President of the Royal College of Physicians, and also held the positions of the Director of CPD, and International education. She was a trustee of The Medical College of St Bartholomew's Hospital Trust and of CancerBackup.

Kumar is a trustee of the British Youth Opera and healthcare funder Barts Charity, and the BMA Foundation for Medical Research.

== Awards and honours ==
In 1999, she became the first recipient of the Asian Woman of the Year (Professional) award, and in 2000 was appointed Commander of the Order of the British Empire (CBE) in recognition of her services to medicine. She was also a recipient of the British Medical Association's Gold Medal for "services to Medicine and Education".

She was appointed Dame Commander of the Order of the British Empire (DBE) in the 2017 Birthday Honours for services to medicine and medical education.

In 2017, she was awarded a Lifetime Achievement for contributions to Medicine by the British Association of Physicians of Indian Origin (BAPIO) and in 2019 she won the BMJ Award for Outstanding Contribution to Health.

She was appointed Dame Grand Cross of the Order of the British Empire (GBE) in the 2026 Birthday Honours.

Non-profit organization positions
Preceded by Sir Charles George	President of the British Medical Association; 2006–2007	Succeeded by Sir Kenneth Calman
Preceded by Dame Deirdre Hine	President of the Royal Medical Benevolent Fund; 2013–2020	Succeeded by Baroness Hollins
Preceded by Robin C. N. Williamson	President of the Royal Society of Medicine; 2010–2012	Succeeded by Sir Michael Rawlins
