= Calman–Hine report =

1995 report on cancer services in the UK

The Calman–Hine report of 1995 examined cancer services in the United Kingdom, and proposed a restructuring of cancer services to achieve a more equitable level of access to high levels of expertise throughout the country.

It was named for Kenneth Calman, Chief Medical Officer for England and Deirdre Hine, the Chief Medical Officers for Wales. Calman chaired the expert group which together with Hine was made up of Dr J Bullimore, Dr T Davies, Dr I Finlay, Mr P Foster, Prof J Hardcastle, Prof R Haward, Ms Rebecca Miles, Gillian Oliver, Prof P Selby, Prof K Sikora, Dr K Thompson, and Dr Howard Marsh.

== See also ==
- Cancer Research UK
