= Robert Salisbury =

Robert Salisbury may refer to:

- Sir Robert Salisbury (educationalist), and author of Field of Dreams
- the pen-name of Robert Gascoyne-Cecil, 7th Marquess of Salisbury (born 1946), political columnist and former leader of the House of Lords
- Robert Gascoyne-Cecil, 3rd Marquess of Salisbury (1830–1903), British prime minister and origin of the phrase "Bob's your uncle"

== See also ==
- Robert Salesbury (1567–1599), Welsh politician
