= Bertorelli =

Bertorelli is a surname. Notable people with the surname include:

- Giovanni Bertorelli (1928–2006), Venezuelan fencer
- Toni Bertorelli (1948–2017), Italian actor

== See also ==
- Bertarelli
- Paramount Restaurants
