= Peter Lavelle =

American journalist and RT television presenter

Doctor Peter Lavelle
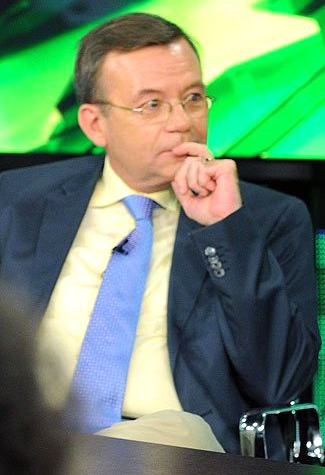
- Education: University of California, Davis (BA, MA, PhD)
- Occupations: Journalist; Lecturer; Writer
- Known for: CrossTalk
- Television: RT America

Peter John Lavelle (born February 27, 1961) is an American journalist and host of CrossTalk, a political talk show on the English-language TV channel RT, which is controlled by the Russian state. Lavelle has claimed that much of the media in America is controlled by Israel. He is the co-founder and co-host, with George Szamuely, of the political commentary show, TheGaggle, on Locals. Lavelle, originally from Tustin, California is now based in Moscow.

== Biography ==
Lavelle received a B.A. in International Economic Relations, an M.A. in European history, and completed Ph.D. courses in Studies in European Economic History from the University of California, Davis. He was a Fulbright Research Fellow at the Institute of Political Studies of the Polish Academy of Sciences in Warsaw, Poland. He has been living in Eastern Europe and Russia for over 30 years while working as a lecturer at the University of Warsaw, a market researcher for Colgate-Palmolive, and an investment analyst for brokerage firms, including Russia's Alfa-Bank.

The New York Times has reported that Lavelle was previously a stringer for United Press International’s Moscow bureau and has contributed to Radio Free Europe/Radio Liberty. Lavelle was also the author of Untimely Thoughts, an electronic newsletter.

== RT host ==
Lavelle settled in Russia in 1997 and was hired by RT (then known as Russia Today) in 2005. "I am proud of my work", he told Julia Ioffe writing for Columbia Journalism Review in 2010 also commenting that he avoids western colleagues based in Moscow. He told Ioffe that they treat RT with contempt.

In 2008, Stephen Heyman wrote in The New York Times that Lavelle was one of RT's journalists who "said they were earnestly trying to tell Russia's story", and that Lavelle said, "No one is telling me what to say."

In an August 2010 online interview, Lavelle characterized his journalism as "dissent" in the American tradition, which he claimed is being forsaken in the land of its birth. He denied allegations of Kremlin spin-doctoring, saying RT's main aim is to "ask our audience one basic thing: Question More".

In 2012, regarding Julian Assange's World Tomorrow interview program for RT, Lavelle told the Christian Science Monitor that "we liked a lot of the WikiLeaks revelations. It was very much in sync with what RT has been reporting about the Arab Spring, and about the duplicitous policies of the US and its allies all along". He called it a "soft power coup for Russia". In July 2014, Lavelle was interviewed by Chris Cuomo of CNN who accused Lavelle of being obsessed with "clearing Russia from culpability" in the shooting down of Malaysia Airlines Mh17 and of behaving more like "a representative of Russia" than a journalist. Lavelle accused the U.S. State Department of relying on Twitter and YouTube for evidence, while Cuomo insisted the US had depended on its own released intelligence for its assertions.

"I'm not a conspiracy theorist and I never allow conspiracy theorists on my program", he insisted on a July 23, 2014 edition of CrossTalk, but then speculated that the Ukrainian government had brought down the plane to gain worldwide sympathy. The PolitiFact website has pointed to multiple 9/11 conspiracy theorists being guests on CrossTalk.

In October 2014, Lavelle was at a Valdai Club meeting in Sochi between domestic and foreign journalists and Vladimir Putin. He was reported as telling the Russian President that he was "the most popular man in modern history" and "looked upon as a saviour of sorts" by much of the world's population. In June the previous year, Putin visited RT's headquarters in Moscow. "Opinion polls show that the opposition in Russia is very small", Lavelle told him. "What kind of opposition would you like to see?"

== See also ==
- George Szamuely
