= Dame Patel =

Dame Patel may refer to:

- Indira Patel (born 1946), Kenya-born British activist and businesswoman
- Priti Patel (born 1972), British politician
- Ranjna Patel, New Zealand public figure
