= Garibaldi School (disambiguation) =

Garibaldi School is the former name of Garibaldi College in Nottinghamshire

Garibaldi School may also refer to:

- Garibaldi Secondary School is a grade 8-12 school in Maple Ridge, British Columbia, Canada.
- Garibaldi School in Garibaldi, Oregon
