= Anti-Federalist League =

- Abbreviation: AFL
- Leader: Alan Sked
- Founders: Alan Sked; Helen Szamuely
- Founded: November 1991
- Dissolved: 3 September 1993
- Split from: Conservative Party (UK), Liberal Party (UK)
- Succeeded by: UK Independence Party
- Ideology: Hard Euroscepticism; Anti-Maastricht Treaty
- Political position: Right-wing

The Anti-Federalist League (AFL) was a small cross-party organisation in the United Kingdom, formed in 1991 to campaign against the Maastricht Treaty. It is mainly remembered now as the forerunner of the UK Independence Party.

The main founder of the Anti-Federalist League was Alan Sked, lecturer at the London School of Economics, leading figure in the Bruges Group, and former official of the Liberal Party. The Maastricht Treaty, which greatly increased the powers of the European Commission, was widely unpopular, according to opinion polls, but all three of the main parties had pledged to support its ratification in the House of Commons. Sked and others felt that this denied voters a say on a crucial constitutional issue. Running AFL candidates was supposed to make good this shortfall in the democratic process. Another founder was Helen Szamuely. Members of the League included future UKIP leaders Nigel Farage (who was previously a member of the Conservative Party, like many of the other early UKIP/AFL members) and Gerard Batten.

The League stood seventeen candidates in the 1992 general election, but failed to make any impact or attract any press attention. It lost all its deposits. The following year, Alan Sked represented it in by-elections in Newbury (gaining 1% of the vote) and Christchurch (1.6%).

Amidst extraordinary scenes in the House of Commons, and in the teeth of intense opposition from a minority of Conservative MPs known as the Maastricht Rebels, the Maastricht Treaty finally passed into law. Many members of the Anti-Federalist League concluded that with the Treaty in place, the only option for anti-federalists was to campaign for complete British withdrawal from the European Union. To this end, Sked and others met in late 1993 to set up a full-blown political party: the UK Independence Party. Not all members of the League followed Sked into the new organisation, but the party did effectively supersede the League, which ceased to exist.

== Election results ==
The League contested seventeen constituencies at the 1992 general election and Sked contested two by-elections in 1993.

=== 1992 United Kingdom general election ===
The 1992 general election was held on Thursday 9 April 1992.

Constituency	Candidate	Votes	%
Bath	Alan Sked	117	0.2
Bristol West	T P E Hedges	42	0.1
Chelsea	D G F Armstrong	88	0.3
South East Cornwall	A O H Quick	227	0.4
Hammersmith	Helen Szamuely	41	0.1
Harrow East	J Lester	49	0.1
Kensington	Anne Bulloch	71	0.2
Kingston-upon-Thames	A J E Scholefield	42	0.1
Leominster	E P Carlisle	640	1.1
Lewisham West	P Coulam	125	0.3
Oxford West and Abingdon	Miss B Nelson	98	0.2
Pembrokeshire	R M Stoddart	158	0.3
Pendle	Mrs V M Thome	263	0.5
Richmond and Barnes	Mrs A K F Ellis-Jones	47	0.1
Staffordshire Moorlands	M C Howson	2,121	3.4
Thurrock	P Compobassi	117	0.2
Westminster North	M Kelly	137	0.3

=== 1993 by-elections ===
Date of election	Constituency	Candidate	Votes	%
6 May 1993	Newbury	Alan Sked	601	1.0
29 July 1993	Christchurch	Alan Sked	878	1.6
