= Bert Carless =

Jamaican-born politician in Birmingham, England

- Born: June 1933
- Died: 14 August 2003 (aged 69–70)
- Occupation: Mechanic, politician
- Political party: Labour Party
- Awards: Officer of the Order of the British Empire

Egbert Sylvester Carless OBE was a politician in Birmingham, England.

Carless was born in June 1933. After working as diesel mechanic at a Jamaican sugar refining plant, he migrated to the United Kingdom, arriving in 1956.

He was elected as the labour councillor for Aston ward in Birmingham, and was the first non-white councillor to sit on Birmingham City Council, serving until 1994. He was re-elected, representing Ladywood Ward, in 1998, serving until 2002. He was a member of the council's education committee.

He was also chair of the board of governors of the city's Handsworth College, and oversaw its transition to be part of City College (now South & City College Birmingham.

He was appointed an Officer of the Order of the British Empire (OBE) in the 1998 Birthday Honours "For services to education and to the community in Birmingham". He was also made an Honorary Alderman of the city of Birmingham, in 1994.

He died as a result of cancer on 14 August 2003. He had five children.

A street in Perry Barr, Birmingham was named "Bert Carless Way" (Note: Bert Carless Way coordinates: 52.516722°N 1.897348°W) in around 2021.

In December 2023, Carless' achievements were marked by the erection of a blue plaque in his honour, in a building at the Handsworth College campus.
