= Helen Szamuely =

Soviet-born British Eurosceptic historian (1950–2017)

- Born: 25 June 1950; Moscow, Soviet Union
- Died: 5 April 2017 (aged 66); London, England
- Education: University of Leeds
- Occupation: Historian
- Known for: Euroscepticism

Helen Szamuely (25 June 1950 – 5 April 2017) was a Soviet-born British historian and Eurosceptic who was a researcher for the Bruges Group and founder of the Anti-Federalist League. After the Maastricht Treaty was signed in 1992, she organised monthly meetings at the Red Lion near Parliament to discuss Europe.

== Early life ==
Szamuely was born in Moscow, daughter of Hungarian Tibor Szamuely and Russian Nina (née Orlova, 1923-1974), both academics. The family moved to Ghana in 1963, where her father taught until they moved to Britain the next year, settling in West London. Szamuely was educated at a Willesden grammar school, then did her A-levels at St Paul's Girls' School before attending the University of Leeds in 1970 study History and Russian, in which she got a first-class degree. She was a research student at St Antony's College, Oxford, from 1975 to 1979, and in 1984 was awarded D.Phil. for her thesis "British Attitudes to Russia 1880-1918".

== Career ==
A prolific writer and translator, Szamuely had articles published in literary and political journals, contributed to The Reader's Companion to Twentieth Century Writers, and was an interviewer and scriptwriter for the BBC Russian Service. She was a Research Fellow at the Centre for Research into Post-Communist Economies from 1997 to 2017. For many years Szamuely was a researcher and political brief writer in the House of Lords, working with peers on EU issues regarding Russia and Turkey. She was a campaigner for release of political prisoners in the Soviet Union, including the poet Nizametdin Akhmetov, whose work she translated. In later years she worked several years for the Countryside Alliance on local food campaigns.

She was a founder member of the Anti-Federalist League, the forerunner to the UK Independence Party (Ukip). She was expelled from Ukip in 1993, soon after it was founded, Nigel Farage later writing this was "a sore loss to the party". She was head of research for the Bruges Group from 2002.

== Personal life ==
Szamuely had a daughter of whose father "she never spoke". She never married. She died of multiple organ failure on 5 April 2017.

== Publications ==
Her articles on history and politics have appeared in publications including History Today, Standpoint, New Statesman, Guardian, Salisbury Review, and EUobserver. She wrote reviews of detective stories for the Social Affairs Unit. She ran her own blogs Your Freedom and Ours, Conservative History Journal and Fisheries - Truth and Fiction and wrote for other blogs including London Historians.

Publications include:

- A "Coming Home" Or Poisoned Chalice? - Helen Szamuely, Bill Jamieson
- Alien Thoughts: Reflections on Identity - Helen Szamuely, Robert W. Cahn, Yahya El-Droubie
- A Delayed Homecoming: An Update on European Union Enlargement - Helen Szamuely
- Samizdat: Based on a Discussion at the CRCE - Dennis O'Keefe, Helen Szamuely
- "What if Lenin's 'sealed' train had not reached Petrograd in 1917?" in Prime Minister Portillo and other things that never happened - edited by Duncan Brack and Iain Dale
- "What if Czechoslovakia had fought in 1938?" in President Gore and other things that never happened - edited by Duncan Brack

Translations include:

- Moving the Mountain: Inside the Perestroika Revolution - Abel Aganbegyan translated by Helen Szamuely from Russian to English
- Choices and Decisions: A Life - Éva Haraszti-Taylor translated by Helen Szamuely from Hungarian to English
