= Deirdre Hine =

Welsh public health physician and administrator

Dame Deirdre Hine DBE FFPH FRCP FLSW

Chief Medical Officer for Wales
- In office 1990–1997

Deputy Chief Medical Officer for Wales
- In office 1984–1987

Personal details
- Born: Deirdre Joan Curran; 16 September 1937 (age 88) Cardiff, Wales
- Occupation: Public health doctor

Dame Deirdre Joan Hine (née Curran; born 16 September 1937) is a Welsh medical doctor. In 1984 she began her career as a public health physician in Wales. She was chair of the Commission for Health Improvement from 1999 to 2004.

== Biography ==
Hine was born to David Alban Curran and his wife, Noreen Mary (née Cliffe), and raised in Cardiff. She attended Heathfield House (Cardiff) and Charlton Park (Cheltenham) schools before earning her MBBCh degree at the Welsh National School of Medicine (now Cardiff University School of Medicine) in 1961. In 1963 she married Raymond Hine and the couple had two sons. She was a medical practitioner at Cardiff's Royal Infirmary. She trained in public health medicine, becoming a specialist in community medicine in 1974.

Her career included, Principal Medical Officer, Welsh Office (1984); Deputy Chief Medical Officer (1985); Director, Breast Cancer Screening Service, Wales (1988); and Chief Medical Officer, Wales (1990). Hine was affiliated with several organisations including Non-executive director of Dwr Cymru Welsh Water; Vice-President, Marie Curie Cancer Care; and Member, Science Committee for Cancer Research UK.

She retired in 1997 and was appointed to the Audit Commission the following year. Hine was named as chair of the Commission for Health Improvement in August 1999, a position which she held until that body was abolished in 2004.

She was elected President of the Royal Society of Medicine (2000–02).

She later served terms as chair of the BUPA Foundation (2004–11), President of the British Medical Association (2005–06) and President of the Royal Medical Benevolent Fund (2008–13).

In 2001 Hine was appointed as an independent member to the House of Lords Appointments Commission.

She chaired the UK's official review into the 2009 swine flu pandemic.

== Awards and honours ==
Hine was appointed Dame Commander of the Order of the British Empire "for services to medicine in Wales" in 1997.

She received honorary fellowships in:

- Royal College of Surgeons of England
- Royal College of Anaesthetists
- Royal College of General Practitioners
- Royal Pharmaceutical Society of Great Britain

Non-profit organization positions
Preceded by Sir Charles George	President of the British Medical Association; 2005-2006	Succeeded by Dame Parveen Kumar
Preceded by Sir Barry Jackson	President of the Royal Medical Benevolent Fund; 2008-2013	Succeeded by Dame Parveen Kumar
Preceded by Lord Soulsby of Swaffham	President of the Royal Society of Medicine; 2000-2002	Succeeded by Sir Barry Jackson
