= George Szamuely =

Hungarian-British political commentator

George Szamuely (born 1954 in Hungary) is a political analyst and public intellectual. He is the author of a history of the breakup of Yugoslavia and the wars that followed, Bombs for Peace: NATO's Humanitarian War on Yugoslavia (2014), and has taught at universities in New York, Budapest, and Belgrade. Educated at the London School of Economics, he has contributed to numerous publications including The Daily Telegraph, The Wall Street Journal, The Times, The American Scholar, and The National Interest. He is the co-founder and co-host of the political commentary show The Gaggle and a regular contributor to the RT programme CrossTalk. Szamuely was born into a prominent Hungarian intellectual family; his father was the historian Tibor Szamuely (1925–1972) and his great-uncle was the Communist revolutionary Tibor Szamuely (1890–1919).

== Biography ==
He was born in Hungary to Tibor Szamuely (1925–1972), of a Hungarian Jewish merchant family, and Nina (née Orlova; 1923-1974), of Russian parentage. His great-uncle was the Communist revolutionary Tibor Szamuely (1890–1919). His sister Helen Szamuely, was a prominent figure in the founding of the UK Independence Party. He was educated in England at University College London and at the London School of Economics. He received a PhD from London Metropolitan University.

He worked for some years as an editor at the Times Literary Supplement and at The National Law Journal. He was also a weekly columnist at the New York Press.

== Political views ==
Szamuely has been an ardent critic of United States foreign policy, arguing that the reality is the diametric opposite of the lofty rhetoric. The professed humanitarian aspirations invariably lead to non-humanitarian outcomes.

Szamuely is a critic of Western policy toward the Balkans, particularly of the actions that led to the destruction of the Socialist Federal Republic of Yugoslavia. He has argued that the Western powers, rather than take responsibility for the irresponsible policies that led inevitably to war, chose to blame and target the most populous Yugoslav nation, the Serbs. Szamuely was a critic of NATO's bombing of Yugoslavia in 1999.

Szamuely has argued that the targeting of the Serbs continued long after the wars in Yugoslavia had come to an end. The principal instrument of the demonization of the Serbs was the International Criminal Tribunal for the Former Yugoslavia. Szamuely's essay describing the practices and jurisprudence of the tribunal was awarded the Giuseppe Torre Award in 2021. The essay was subsequently published in the book "The Strange Case of the Hague Tribunal for the Former Yugoslavia." Szamuely has written about the judicial rulings handed down by the tribunal. As he has written, the ICTY, in its eagerness to punish the Serb leaders of the 1990s, got into the business of "defining genocide down." Szamuely belongs to the group of journalists and international scholars, including Edward S. Herman, who have called into question the official story about what happened at Srebrenica.

Szamuely has also addressed the deaths of ICTY defendants at Scheveningen. In particular, he questioned the circumstances surrounding the death of former Serb and Yugoslav President Slobodan Milošević.

He has been critical of the workings of the United Nations tribunals, in particular the International Criminal Tribunal for the Former Yugoslavia. He argues that the tribunal and human rights groups such as Human Rights Watch foster conflict rather than reconciliation and serve the interests of Western powers and those of their allies by targeting their opponents, while ignoring or minimizing their, often far more serious, crimes. He has expressed doubts as to whether the International Criminal Court would ever be willing or able to administer impartial justice. He has argued that Serbia's actions in Yugoslavia have been unfairly misinterpreted.

Szamuely's history of NATO's intervention in the Balkans, Bombs for Peace: NATO's Humanitarian War on Yugoslavia, is published by Amsterdam University Press. Monthly Review writer Gregory Elich described the book as "a revealing and sharply argued analysis of Western intervention in the Balkan wars of the 1990s."
