= Tibor Szamuely (historian) =

Hungarian historian (1925–1972)

- Born: 17 May 1925; Moscow, Russia
- Died: 10 December 1972 (aged 47); London, United Kingdom
- Occupation(s): historian and polemicist

Tibor Szamuely (14 May 1925 – 10 December 1972) was a Russian-born Hungarian historian and polemicist.

Szamuely was born in Moscow, the eldest of three children and elder son of György Szamuely and his wife, Elsa Szanto, both from Hungarian Jewish merchant families. He received his education in England, first at Bertrand Russell's Beacon Hill School in Hampshire, and later at the progressive Summerhill School in Suffolk. Returning to Moscow in the 1930s with his family, he was later evacuated to Tomsk during the Second World War. He served with the Red Army in their occupation of Hungary, but would later return to the Soviet Union to study history at the University of Moscow.

== Background ==
In 1950, he was arrested on espionage charges and spent eighteen months at a lumber camp before being released at the request of Mátyás Rákosi. After his release, he took up academic work in Hungary, becoming vice-rector of the University of Budapest in 1957. After failing to participate in an attack on Georg Lukács, he was, however, dismissed from this post. He left Hungary in 1963 to teach at the Kwame Nkrumah Institute of Economic and Political Sciences (later the Kwame Nkrumah Ideological Institute) in Winneba, Ghana. In 1964, he settled in Britain with his family.

During his time in England, he taught at the University of Reading and contributed frequently to The Spectator, Encounter, The Daily Telegraph and The Sunday Telegraph. He was a close friend of Robert Conquest and Kingsley Amis and was a regular attendee of the lunches at Bertorelli restaurant.

He spent the latter part of his life living in Bayswater. In 1972, Szamuely died of cancer aged 47 in a hospital in London. He is buried at Kensal Green Cemetery, London.

His major study of Soviet history, The Russian Tradition, was edited by Robert Conquest and published posthumously by Secker & Warburg in 1974.

He was the nephew of Tibor Szamuely, a politician during the Hungarian Soviet Republic of 1919. He married Nina Orlova (1923–1974), and was the father of George Szamuely, journalist and author of Bombs for Peace: NATO's Humanitarian War on Yugoslavia, and of Helen Szamuely, a prominent figure in the founding of the UK Independence Party.
