= Gillian Oliver =

British nursing administrator

Dame Gillian Frances Oliver, DBE, FRCN (born 10 October 1943) is a British nursing administrator. An expert in cancer nursing and palliative care, she has been instrumental in developing cancer services, policy and strategy in the UK and beyond.

She has been involved with cancer nursing for many years—at a practical level as a ward sister—at organisational and managerial levels as Director of Patient Services, and at national level while working as Adviser in Oncology Nursing at the RCN and with other organisations.

== Career ==
Oliver finished her training to be a nurse at the Middlesex Hospital and started a lifelong commitment to caring for people with cancer and the organisation of services dealing with cancer.

She has represented cancer nursing in many national and international organisations, including the Board of the International Society of Nurses in Cancer Care, the Chief Medical Officer's Expert Advisory Group on Cancer, and, most recently, the Department of Health's National Advisory Group on Palliative and Supportive Care. She was on the expert group that produced the Calman–Hine report on cancer services in the UK, this was produced for the government in 1995.

She joined Macmillan Cancer Relief as UK Director of Service Development in April 2000 and has actively promoted the voice of the service user as well as professional knowledge, skill and experience in the development of effective cancer services. Since retiring from full-time work in October 2004, she has continued with Macmillan in a part-time capacity as Adviser for Nursing and Allied Health Professionals. She remains a Trustee of the National Council for Palliative Care and is undertaking various projects related to cancer services, nursing and care.

== Honours ==
She was created DBE in 1998 for her services to healthcare and nursing as Head Nurse and Director of Services at the Clatterbridge Centre for Oncology, Merseyside and was awarded a Fellowship of the Royal College of Nursing later that year.

In 2004, she was awarded the Gold Medal from Macmillan Cancer Relief in recognition of outstanding services to the people and families of those suffering from cancer.

She received her Liverpool John Moores University Honorary Fellowship on 31 July 2006 in recognition of her services to nursing and health care.
