= Bertarelli =

Bertarelli is an Italian surname. Notable people with the surname include:

- Camillo Bertarelli (1886–1982), Italian cyclist
- Dona Bertarelli (born 1968), Swiss businesswoman and billionaire
- Ernesto Bertarelli (born 1965), Italian-born Swiss businessman, billionaire and philanthropist
- Kirsty Bertarelli (born 1971), British billionaire
