= Susan Owens (academic) =

Susan Elizabeth Owens OBE FBA FAcSS (born 24 January 1954) is Emeritus Professor of Environment and Policy, University of Cambridge. She is Fellow Emerita of Newnham College.

Owens was a member of the Royal Commission on Environmental Pollution that produced the ‘Turning the Tide’ report which addressed the impact of fisheries on the marine environment.

She is a member of the DEFRA advisory panel on Highly Protected Marine Areas.

She was educated at the University of East Anglia where she graduated with a BSc and a PhD entitled "The energy implications of alternative rural development patterns" in 1981. She joined the University of Cambridge as an academic in 1981.

She was a recipient of the Royal Geographical Society's Back Award in 2000. She was made an OBE in 1998, and a Fellow of the British Academy in 2011.
