= Eileen Rubery =

Eileen Rubery CB FRCR FFPH FRCPath

Under-Secretary and Head, Protection of Health Division, Department of Health
- In office 1996–1999

Under-Secretary and Head, Health Aspects of Environmental and Food Division, Department of Health
- In office 1995–1997

Personal details
- Born: Eileen Doris McDonnell; 16 May 1943 (age 83)

Eileen Doris Rubery (née McDonnell; born 16 May 1943) is a British academic who has worked in such diverse fields as medical research (at one point Senior Principal Medical Officer of the Department of Health), business and management studies, and presently, art history and history.

She was appointed CB in 1998.

She was Registrar of the Roll and a Senior Research Fellow of Girton College, Cambridge from 2000 to 2013. She has worked as a Tutor in Art History at the Institute of Continuing Education, University of Cambridge since 2004, and as a Lecturer in Art History at the Victoria and Albert Museum since 2016.
