= CrossTalk =

- Title card
- Presented by: Peter Lavelle

Production
- Production location: Moscow
- Running time: 30 minutes

Original release
- Network: RT
- Release: September 30, 2009 – present

CrossTalk is a current affairs debate television program on RT. It is billed by RT as "RT's flagship program." It is hosted by American journalist Peter Lavelle, who created the show. It also features Yelena Khanga. CrossTalk premiered on September 30, 2009 and airs for 30 minutes. Guests are encouraged to intervene whenever they wish which, according to Oliver Bullough in the New Statesman, means the conversation can "degrade into barely comprehensible shouting".

In a 2010 episode of CrossTalk, Lavelle's two guests — Douglas Murray of the Centre for Social Cohesion and Anne-Elisabeth Moutet of the Rousseau Institute — were taken aback when he said that the perpetrators of the September 11 attacks were "not fundamentalists". Lavelle later said this particular episode was a "fiasco" because he lacked a "balanced pair of experts".

An edition in July 2016 was a response to a NATO summit in which all participants were critical of the alliance. One participant said NATO was "a minute group of megalomaniac powerbrokers hell bent on sending us into a third world war". According to Lavelle, he had been prevented from showing a defence of NATO in captions because of technical problems, although anti-NATO captions were shown. The programme has conveyed conspiracy theories that the September 11 attacks were an inside job and AIDS being caused by AIDS drugs themselves.
