= Lorna Boreland-Kelly =

British legal professional

Dame Lorna May Boreland-Kelly is a British lay magistrate who is a former member of the Judicial Appointments Commission.

Boreland-Kelly has been presiding lay magistrate at the City of Westminster Magistrates' Court since 1991. She was appointed as Member, Judicial Appointments Commission in January 2006 as the lay justice member, and retired in 2012. She was Chair of Governors at Lambeth College up to her retirement in July 2013.

From 2000 she was employed by the London Borough of Croydon as Group Manager (Children and Families) at Mayday NHS Healthcare Trust, until her retirement in May 2013.

== Family ==
Lorna May Boreland is married to Anthony Owen Kelly; they have six children. She belongs to the Union of Catholic Mothers.
