= Red Lion, Westminster =

Pub in Whitehall, London

The Red Lion
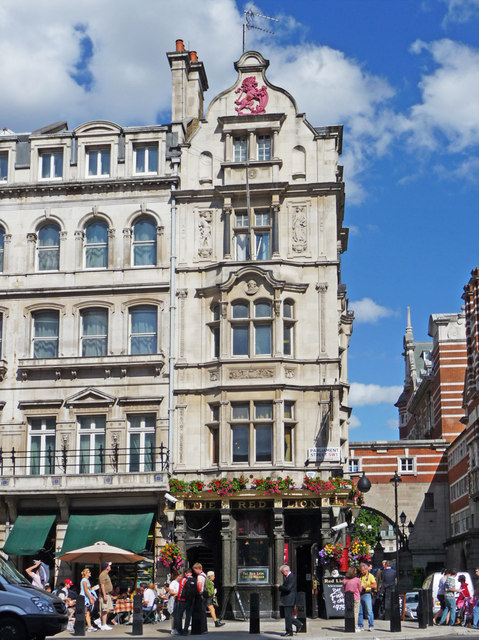
- The Red Lion
- Interactive map of The Red Lion
- Type: Public house
- Location: 8 Parliament Street, London SW1
- Coordinates: 51°30′7.48″N 0°7′32.45″W
- Built: 1890

Listed Building – Grade II
- Official name: RED LION PUBLIC HOUSE
- Designated: 14-Jun-1983
- Reference no.: 1226437

The Red Lion is a Grade II listed public house at 48 Parliament Street, London SW1. The pub is known for its political clientele and has been described as "the usual watering hole for MPs and parliament staffers" and "much-plotted-in" due to its proximity to UK political institutions including Whitehall, the Palace of Westminster, and 10 Downing Street.

== History ==
As early as 1434, a tavern known as the Hopping Hall existed in this location. In the Victorian era, a pub called the Red Lion standing on this spot was visited by Charles Dickens as a young boy. The current building was erected in about 1890. It has been visited by Prime Ministers Winston Churchill, Clement Attlee and Edward Heath. It is owned by Fuller's Brewery.

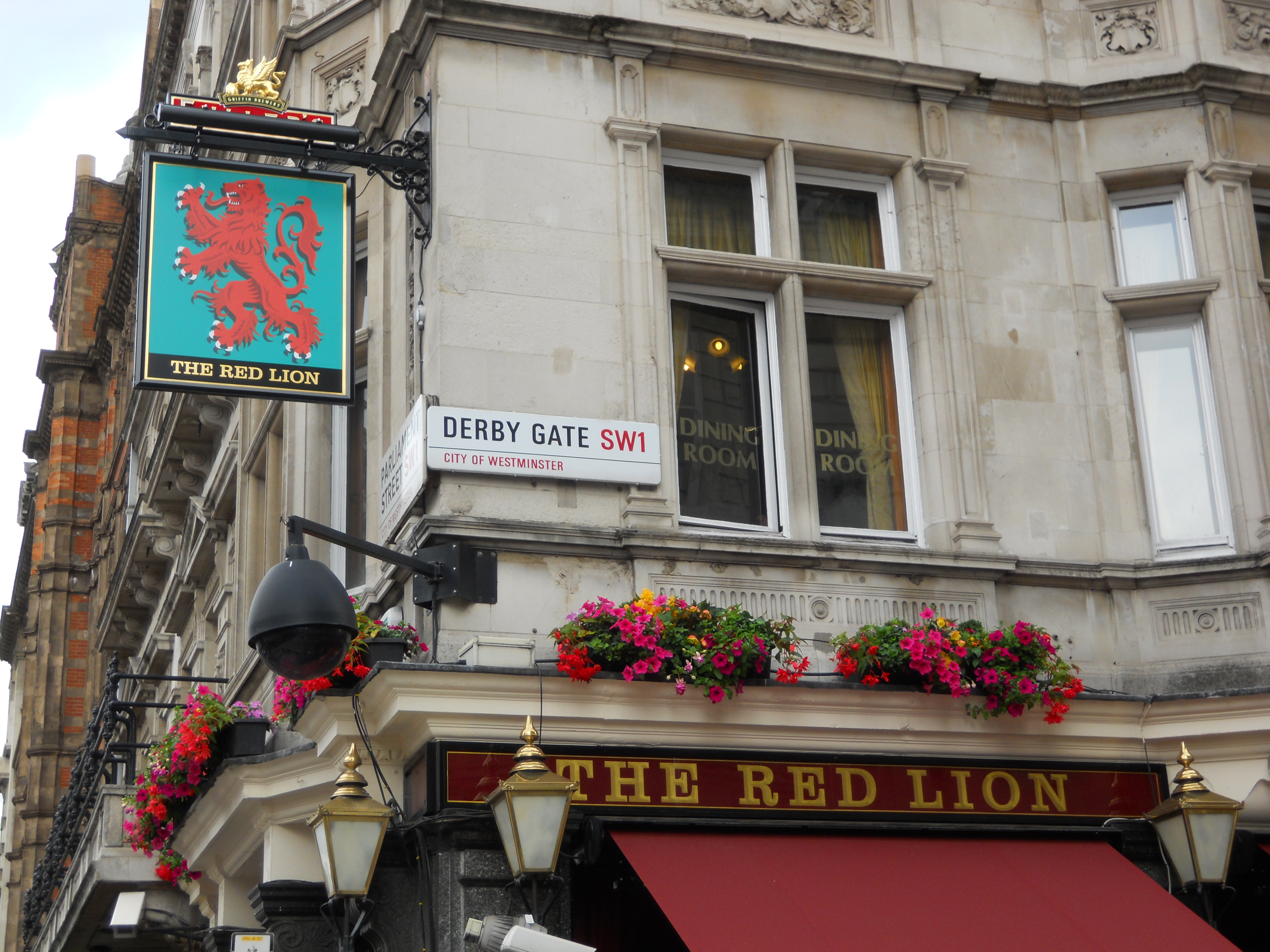
The Red Lion Pub

== Association with British politics ==
Although there are several pubs and bars located within the Palace of Westminster, the Red Lion is the closest public house to the Parliamentary Estate and so often frequented by MPs, civil servants, and political journalists. Interviews with clientele often feature complaints about the pub's expensive drinks and cramped interior, but note that its location makes it indispensable. Political journalist and author Marie Le Conte described the Red Lion as "the lowest common denominator – people say ‘I don’t go there’ but then everyone ends up there."

The pub's association with UK politics became notorious in 1997 after Charlie Whelan, press adviser for then-Chancellor of the Exchequer Gordon Brown, unofficially briefed journalists at the Red Lion that the UK would not be adopting the Euro. Whelan did so without the knowledge or authorisation of Tony Blair, with some sources suggesting that the "briefing" was simply that Whelan was overheard by journalists discussing the policy. Blair was reportedly outraged at this breach of protocol and rang Whelan (who was still at the pub) to complain, only to be told: "Sorry Tony, it’s too late."

The Red Lion is one of several public houses in the Westminster area to be fitted with a division bell, used to alert MPs that a vote is imminent (referred to in parliamentary language as a "division" as it requires dividing the House). Others include the Blue Boar and Westminster Arms. Members of the public and visiting tourists sometimes mistake the ringing of the bell for a fire alarm.
