= The Garibaldi School =

Location
- Garibaldi Road; Forest Town; Mansfield, Nottinghamshire, NG19 0JX; England
- 53°09′38″N 1°08′01″W

Information
- Type: Academy
- Motto: Pride,Respect,Achieve
- Local authority: Nottinghamshire
- Trust: Nova Education Trust
- Department for Education URN: 144687 Tables
- Ofsted: Reports
- Head of School: Paddy Cassidy
- Executive Head Teacher: Ryan Hawley
- Gender: Co-educational
- Age: 11 to 18
- Website: The Garibaldi School

The Garibaldi School (formerly Garibaldi College) is a co-educational secondary school and sixth form built in the 1960s. It is situated near to the edge of Clipstone village, Nottinghamshire (part of Newark and Sherwood District Council administrative area) but lies within Mansfield District Council's Newlands electoral ward and it teaches young people from Clipstone and the Forest Town area of Mansfield. It provides pupils from 11-16 with a GCSE education and 16 to 18 year-olds with an advanced GCE or VCE education through their sixth form.

== History ==
=== Secondary modern school ===
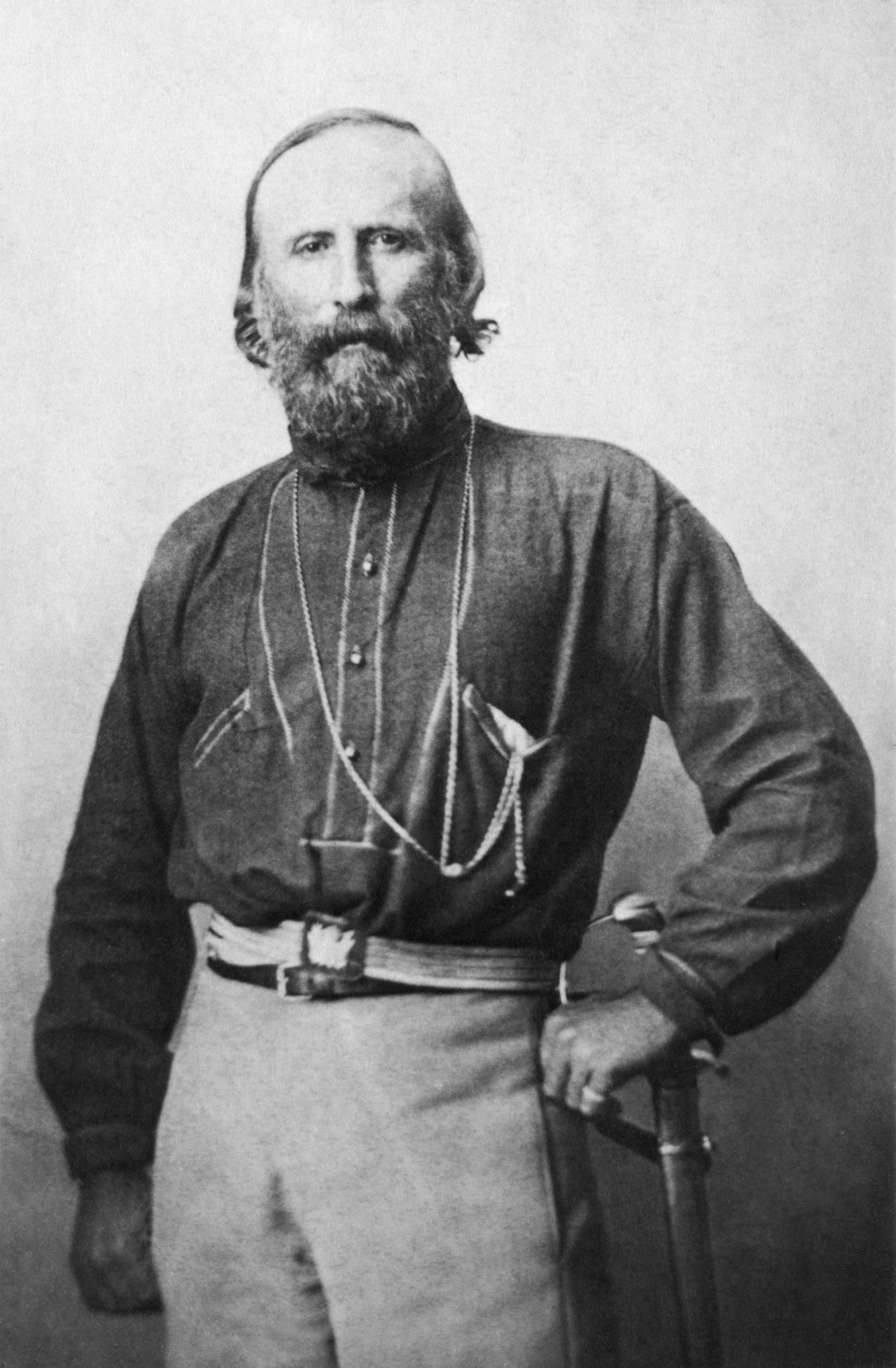
Giuseppe Garibaldi, was an Italian general who fought in many military campaigns that led to Italian unification. He is celebrated as one of the greatest generals of modern times and as the "Hero of the Two Worlds" because of his military enterprises in South America and Europe.

The school was founded in the 1960s and was named for the Italian leader Giuseppe Garibaldi. The Garibaldi County Secondary School opened on Tuesday 8 September 1959. It was named after a nearby woodland plantation.

The first headmaster Mr Neville Purdy, was educated at the Brunts Grammar School, and had been head for five years at a school in Shuttlewood in Derbyshire. The school had 270 at first, which was to reach 480.

On Tuesday 8 September 1963 the school was visited by the missionary Gladys Aylward, who said that schoolchildren in Britain were too addicted to 'silly comics and stupid films'. A house of the school was named after her.

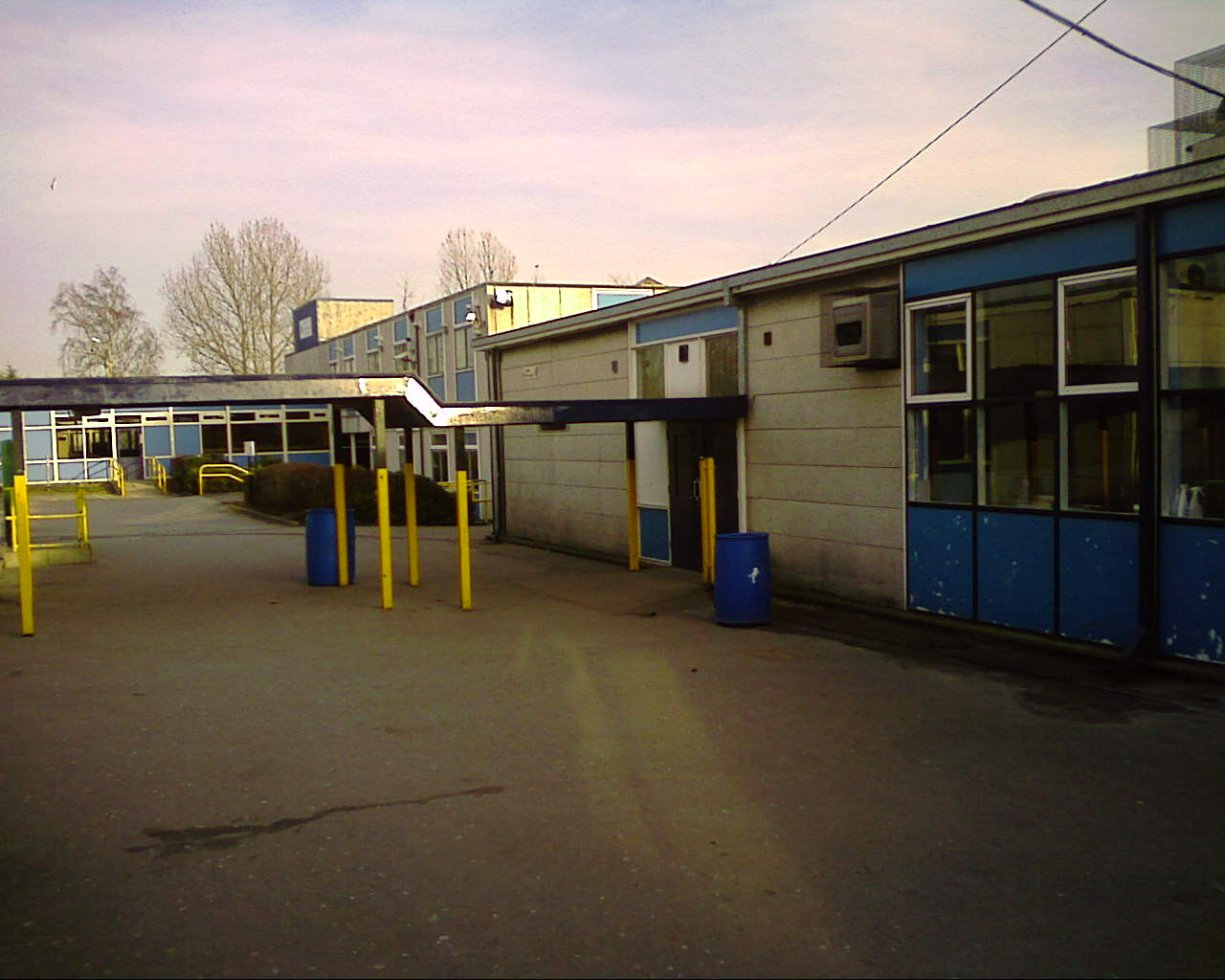
The school grounds

Old College logo

=== Comprehensive ===
The school went comprehensive in September 1973.

29 year old teacher Manuel Moreno was suspended in May 1974, appearing on the front page of the Nottingham Evening Post . The headmaster was Derek McIntosh. Moreno was an advocate of 'progressive education' and 'child-centred education', without 'imposed discipline'. He did not like 'conformity'. He later wanted to establish a 'free school' in Nottingham, where children could turn up when they liked.

=== New headmaster ===
Garibaldi Comprehensive School was by the 1980s suffering from a poor reputation. In 1989 a new headmaster, Bob Salisbury, was appointed who put in place a programme of improvements that lasted five years. The school removed levels of management and marketed itself. The school was able to attract new funding and the head was recognised for his skills as an entrepreneur. The head noted that the success came from not investing in one-off initiatives but in activities that continued from year to year. Salisbury was known for his 'bobbing cork' analogy. He believed his staff should progress like a cork along a stream, knowing that they were free to speed up, slow down or try a different route. Bob Salisbury was given a knighthood in 1998 in recognition of his work in Education.

=== 1976 fire ===
The school appeared on the front page of Nottingham Evening Post on 12 January 1976, when a large fire had been discovered at 4am that morning. The whole of the school records were destroyed, and a three-storey block, with cooking and needlework rooms, and biology and chemistry laboratories. The Nottinghamshire chief fire officer J.J.Boggis was at the scene.

== Curriculum ==
A 2009 Ofsted Inspection of the Design and Technology department found that overall their education was "good". An earlier inspection of the whole school in 2008 rated the school as "good" overall.

In March 2013, Ofsted rated Garibaldi as a "good" school, with some aspects of "outstanding" teaching. In August 2013, Garibaldi received some of the best GCSE and A-Level results the school has ever seen, and topped the league tables, ranking as one of the best schools in Nottinghamshire. The college was also ranked within the top 25 schools across the nation.

== Investments ==
With help from the governments specialist status scheme, it was a specialist computing and mathematics college from 2003 until 2012 when it lost its specialism. The college then became known simply called 'Garibaldi College' instead of 'Garibaldi Maths and Computing College'. Locally known as 'Gara', the words "Pride, Respect and Achieve" are now the school's key words.

In 2010 the school was identified as part of a rebuilding programme. The council noted that the older buildings were costly to maintain and it was intended to rebuild them but keep the newer buildings like the sports hall, however, the long overdue rebuild was cancelled and all plans were scrapped
