= Charles Frederick George =

English physician and academic

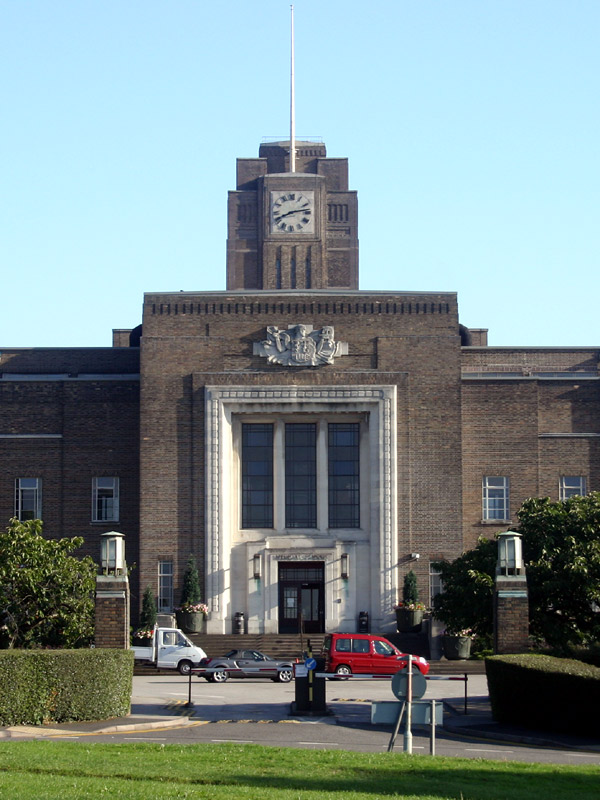
Birmingham University Medical School

Sir Charles Frederick George FRCP FRSA FFPM FMedSci (born 3 April 1941) is an English physician and academic.

George was born in Birmingham to William Hubert George and Evelyn Pryce, and was educated in Oundle. He graduated from Birmingham University with an Intercalated BSc in Anatomy in 1962, and a MBChB in Medicine in 1965.

He was President of the British Medical Association from 2004 to 2005. He was Dean of the Faculty of Medicine at Southampton University from 1983 to 1999, and Professor of Clinical Pharmacology at Southampton University from 1986 to 1990 and again from 1993 to 1998. He was medical director of the British Heart Foundation from 1999 to 2004.

He was made a Knight Bachelor in the 1998 Birthday Honours, "for services to medicine and medical education".

George was awarded the BMA Gold Medal in 2010. He was awarded an honorary DSc by the University of Birmingham in 2003, an honorary DM by the University of Southampton in 2004, and an honorary DSc by the University of Leicester in 2007.
