= Indira Patel =

Kenya-born British activist and businesswoman

Dame Indira Patel DBE (born 27 March 1946) is a Kenya-born British activist and businesswoman.

== Life ==
Born and educated in Kenya, Patel's father died when she was only nine years old, she was raised by her mother. Patel first worked as a schoolteacher in East Africa before fleeing the anti-Indian pogroms of Idi Amin's regime in 1975 with her husband, Bhanu, a structural engineer and real estate investor, and their two sons.

In the UK, Patel worked with her husband in his real estate dealings. She later became an activist who worked to establish Asian Women's Voluntary Organisations and helped institute provisions for vegetarian meals and translator services in hospitals, as well as producing educational videos on such women's health issues as breast cancer, hysterectomies, and menopause.

Patel spoke worldwide at major women's conferences around the world and worked with the United Nations in Geneva speaking on harmful practices within certain cultures and traditions. She was then invited to work with the UN in New York. Between 1996 and 2004, she served as a Commissioner of the Women's National Commission (WNC)'s advisory body to the UK government. She chaired and led the WNC delegation to the World Conference on Racism in South Africa. She contributed to the recommendations in The Beijing Platform for Action, Implementation of the UN Security Council resolution 1325 and Resolution on crimes committed in the name of Honour, signed off by 192 countries.

In 2011, Patel was elevated to Dame Commander of the Order of the British Empire (DBE).

Dame Indira Patel and her family own property in Bambolim, North Goa, India.
