= Robert Salisbury (educationalist) =

British educationalist

Sir Robert Salisbury is an educationalist, and a "leading expert" on education funding. He has an international reputation for his ideas on leadership styles and staff motivation. He is most noted for transforming a failing secondary school in a pit village in Nottinghamshire into a "beacon of success" at the heart of its community, winning a number of awards and attracting a stream of famous visitors.

== Career ==
Until 2001, he was a Professor in the School of Education at the University of Nottingham. Before that he was head teacher at The Garibaldi School in Forest Town, Mansfield, Nottinghamshire. When he was appointed head teacher there in 1989, the school had a poor reputation and unmotivated staff. His five-year plan turned the school round, and by 1993 Salisbury had become recognised as a successful entrepreneur. In 1998, Salisbury was knighted for his work in Education.

In 2011 he led an enquiry into numeracy and literacy at schools in Northern Ireland.

In 2013, he reviewed the funding of schools in Northern Ireland for the Northern Ireland department for education. His review claimed that there was "a long rump of under-achievement in Northern Ireland", and that "Northern Ireland has too many small schools and too many types of school which can no longer be funded".

In or before 2015, he was asked to review further education colleges.

In 2019, he was criticised by the DUP MP Ian Paisley for "dismissing a significant number of high-achieving young adults in Northern Ireland", when he described some of the top schools in Northern Ireland as "Exam factories".

== Personal life ==
Robert Salisbury was born in Newton Drive, Stapleford and moved to Warren Avenue when aged eleven. He and his wife Rosemary now live in County Tyrone, where they have spent 15 years converting 17 acres of barren fields into a wildlife refuge.

== Publications ==
- Field Of Dreams: How We Transformed a Rural Desert into a Thriving Wildlife Garden ISBN 978-1780731728, under the pen-name Bob Salisbury
- An independent review of the common funding scheme. Sir Robert Salisbury, Chair, Independent Review of Common Funding Scheme (January 2013) https://dera.ioe.ac.uk/16379/7/independent_review_of_cfs_Redacted.pdf
- Salisbury, R. (2009). Report of the Literacy and Numeracy Taskforce. Available from: http://www.deni.gov.uk/literacy_and_numeracy_taskforce_report_2008-2010.pdf, as referenced in https://pure.ulster.ac.uk/ws/portalfiles/portal/11364696/Education_Policy_in_NI_a_Review.pdf
