= Paramount Restaurants =

British chain restaurant operator

- Company type: Private
- Industry: Restaurant
- Parent: Silverfleet Capital

Paramount Restaurants was a chain restaurant operator in the United Kingdom. It was formerly known as Groupe Chez Gérard. It operated in 52 locations using several brands:

- Bertorelli
- Brasserie Gérard
- Caffè Uno (acquired 2005)
- Chez Gérard
- Il Bertorelli
- Livebait

In November 2011 the company went into administration.
