= Princess Mary's Royal Air Force Hospital Halton =

Former RAF hospital in Buckinghamshire, England

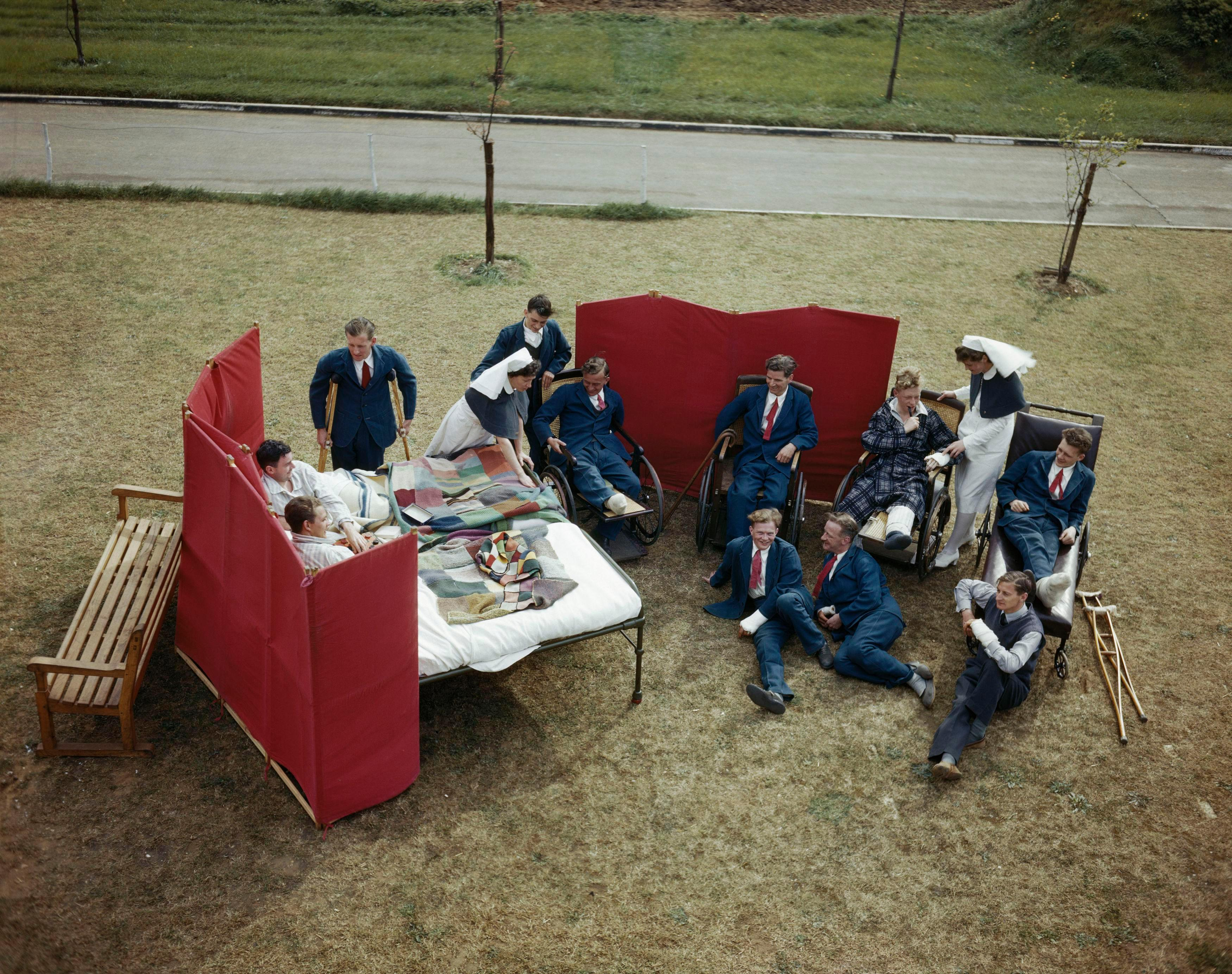
- Two nurses with convalescent servicemen in the garden at Princess Mary's RAF Hospital Halton

Geography
- Location: Halton, Buckinghamshire, England
- Coordinates: 51.769°N 0.729°W

Organisation
- Care system: Military
- Funding: Government hospital
- Patron: Princess Mary

Services
- Beds: 650 (1939)

History
- Opened: 31 October 1927
- Closed: 31 March 1996

Links
- Lists: Hospitals in England

The Princess Mary's Royal Air Force Hospital Halton, was the first Royal Air Force hospital to be built that was dedicated to air force personnel. Located on what was then the largest of the RAF camps at RAF Halton in Buckinghamshire, England, the hospital treated over 20,000 patients during the Second World War and was the first place in the world to use penicillin on a large-scale. The hospital continued in use throughout the Cold War, only closing in 1996 due to defence cuts.

== History ==
The first hospital at the camp was formed in 1919 as RAF General Hospital, Halton, on the south side of RAF Halton Camp. This consisted of some wooden huts on the southwest side of the base, overlooking the main part of camp. This early incarnation included a medical school, and an isolation hospital which had three huts. The post-First World War air force was consolidated in 1920, (180 flying squadrons had been reduced to 25 on active service) and medical provision for the RAF would be undertaken at existing army hospitals apart from a few key RAF locations, such as at Halton which had the apprenticeships school. In 1925, the pathology unit was moved from the RAF Hospital at Finchley to Halton, with the rest of the hospital at Finchley moving to Uxbridge. However, by the mid-1920s, a larger more modern hospital was needed, and a design was approved in 1923, but it did not reach completion for over four years. The new hospital was opened by Princess Mary on 31 October 1927, and in 1929, treated nearly 2,700 patients. In 1938, one year before the hostilities of the Second World War, the hospital treated over 7,500 patients.

At the start of the Second World War, Halton was used as an initial assessment point for aeromedical evacuations from the continent (Europe). These flights started a mere 25 days into the declaration of war. Throughout the Second World War, Halton hospital treated over 20,000 patients and also became the first hospital in the world to use penicillin on a large-scale. One staff member on the ophthalmic ward had the unusual task of collecting empty face-cream jars and sending them to Professor Florey at Oxford, who would return the jars with, what was at that time, precious penicillin. Another one of its functions was testing water and sewerage samples from the many bases around the UK, which were tested at the department for Pathology and Tropical Medicine. Of the 150 samples tested in 1944, 11 were found to be unsatisfactory. Aircrew who had suffered burns were treated at the hospital during the Second World War, and in January 1953, the Air Ministry approved a new unit for plastic surgery which would consist of 60 beds, though like other functions at the hospital, this was also available for the general public. The admissions and treatment records for 1945 showed that the hospital at Halton admitted 11,311 patients, and all but eight of these were Royal Air Force personnel.

RAF Hospital Halton was widely known within the medical community post-war for its renal unit. In the 1970s, the hospital possessed the only mobile dialysis unit in Europe (the other one being in the United States).

The hospital closed on 31 March 1996. The remains of the hospital were demolished in 2008, and a housing estate has been erected on the site, which covered some 20 hectares (49 acres). A brick memorial now stands at the point where the entrance to the hospital.

== Specialisations ==
Besides functioning as the hospital for RAF Halton, the hospital had the following specialisations:

- Anaesthesiology
- Aviation medicine
- Burns and plastic surgery
- Dermatology
- ENT
- General surgery
- Gynaecology and obstetrics
- Maxillo-facial surgery
- Medicine
- Nephrology
- Neurology
- Oncology
- Ophthalmology
- Oral surgery
- Orthopaedic surgery
- Paediatrics
- Pathology and tropical medicine
- Psychiatry
- Radiology
- Urology

== Badge ==
A badge for the unit was awarded by the Queen in January 1960. It featured a lamp against a red cross. The motto of the unit was Vigilance.

== Notable personnel ==
- Emily Blair, Matron-in-chief (1938 – 1943)
- Helen Cargill, served at the hospital in the 1920s
- John Cooke, medical division officer in 1972
- Joanna Cruickshank, matron-in-chief (1921 – 1930)
- Douglas Bader, had new legs (tin pins) fitted at the hospital, and danced with one of the PMRAFNS nurses to celebrate
- Immanuel J. Klette, patient at the hospital after a crash in September 1943
- Geoffrey Page, was treated at the hospital before being moved to the plastic surgery hospital at East Grinstead
- Charles Soutar, was in command of the hospital in the early 1970s
- Gladys Taylor, matron-in-chief (1943 – 1948)
- Katherine Watt, matron-in-chief (1930 – 1938)
- Harold Whittingham, worked as director of the Central Laboratory in the late 1920s
- Frank Whittle, admitted as a patient in May 1944 with a skin complaint
