= Diseases Prevention (Metropolis) Act 1883 =

Act of the Parliament of the United Kingdom

Diseases Prevention (Metropolis) Act 1883 (Note: Section 1.)
- Act of Parliament
- Parliament of the United Kingdom
- Long title: An Act to make better provision as regards the Metropolis for the isolation and treatment of persons suffering from Cholera and other Infectious Diseases; and for other purposes.
- Citation: 46 & 47 Vict. c. 35
- Territorial extent: United Kingdom

Dates
- Royal assent: 20 August 1883
- Commencement: 20 August 1883 (Note: The Acts of Parliament (Commencement) Act 1793.)
- Expired: 1 September 1884 (Note: Section 13.)
- Repealed: 1 January 1892
Other legislation
Amends	Diseases Prevention Act 1855
Repealed by	Public Health (London) Act 1891
Relates to	Metropolitan Poor Act 1867

Status: Repealed

Text of statute as originally enacted

The Diseases Prevention (Metropolis) Act 1883 (46 & 47 Vict. c. 35) was an act of the Parliament of the United Kingdom passed in 1883, during the reign of Queen Victoria.

Earlier in the century the Metropolitan Asylums Board (MAB) had been established under the Metropolitan Poor Act 1867 (30 & 31 Vict. c. 6) to deal with London's sick poor, run as a Poor Law institution. But under increasing pressure resulting from a series of smallpox epidemics in the early 1880s a royal commission was set up in 1881 to investigate how best to deal with those suffering from infectious diseases. The commission recommended that the provision of hospital treatment for those with infectious diseases should be decoupled from the Poor Law, and instead be considered part of London's sanitary arrangements. The commission also recommended that paupers and non-paupers should be treated alike, although there might be separate wards for those able to pay.

The act effectively abolished the distinction between paupers and non-paupers in the provision of the MAB's hospital care. It also had the effect of permitting workhouse infirmaries to treat paying non-paupers as well as their own inmates, and by the beginning of the 20th century some were even able to operate as private hospitals.

== Subsequent developments ==
The whole act was repealed by section 142(1) of, and the fourth schedule to, the Public Health (London) Act 1891 (54 & 55 Vict. c. 76), which came into force on 1 January 1892.

== Bibliography ==
- Ayers, Gwendoline M. (1971), England's First State Hospitals and the Metropolitan Asylums Board, 1867–1930, University of California Press, ISBN 978-0-520-01792-4
- May, Trevor (2011), The Victorian Workhouse, Shire Publications, ISBN 978-0-74780-355-3
