= Metropolitan Asylums Board =

The Metropolitan Asylums Board (MAB) was established under Poor Law legislation to deal with London's sick and poor. It was established by the Metropolitan Poor Act 1867 (30 & 31 Vict. c. 6) and dissolved on 31 March 1930, when its functions were transferred to the London County Council.

== Background to the establishment of the Metropolitan Asylums Board ==
The Metropolitan Poor Act 1867 was passed following multiple campaigns to improve the medical and nursing care for sick paupers, by the health section of the National Association for the Promotion of Social Science; the Workhouse Visiting Society; the Poor Law Medical Reform Association; Florence Nightingale enlisting multiple influential supporters such as Edwin Chadwick; the Lancet and the British Medical Association. In September 1866, the president of the Poor Law Board, Gathorne Hardy, instructed two doctors, Dr W. O. Markham and Mr Uvedale Corbett, to visit all of London workhouses with a view to procuring information which might assist him in drafting new legislation for the reform of workhouse infirmaries. There was a particular concern that those suffering from infectious fevers and smallpox, and the insane, should be removed from the workhouses and treated in separate hospitals.

== The first decades of Metropolitan Asylums Board ==
The Metropolitan Poor Act 1867 (30 & 31 Vict. c. 6) instructed that all unions and parishes across London were combined for the reception and relief of the poor suffering from fever, smallpox or insanity under the Metropolitan Asylums District and its board of management. The area covered was defined through the Metropolis Management Act 1855, excluding the hamlet of Penge.

By 1868, the MAB had identified the need for more hospitals for people identified at the time as insane or imbeciles (people with severe learning difficulties) or with smallpox or other infectious diseases. The MAB purchased land and commenced building asylums at Leavesden in Hertfordshire and Caterham in Surrey, and smallpox and fever hospitals at Haverstock Hill in Hampstead, Homerton in East London and Stockwell in South London.

The MAB responsibilities were extended to cover people with cholera (1883); diphtheria (both pauper and non pauper,1888), Poor Law children and children with ringworm and opthalmia (1897), poor law boys training for sea service (1875).

== The Metropolitan Asylums Board in the 20th century ==
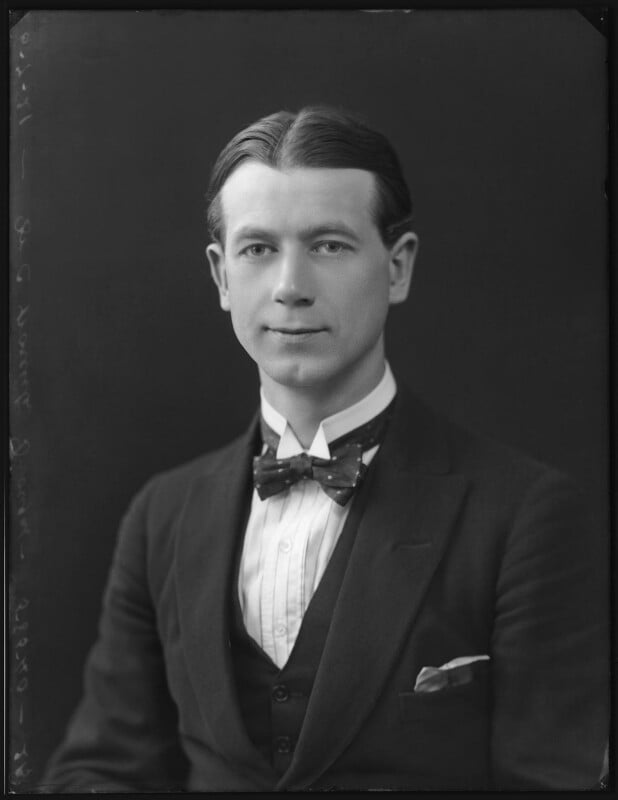
Dr C. Worster-Drought, MA, MD, MRCP, MRC, consulting physician in 1930 at the Metropolitan Asylums Board hospitals

By 1900 the MAB was responsible for 2,486 beds in smallpox hospitals in country areas and 6,108 beds in fever hospitals in London.

The MAB's responsibilities were enlarged to include care of people with measles (1911), puerperal fever (1912), trench fever, malaria, dysentery (1919), with tuberculosis but uninsured under the National Insurance Act 1911, venereal disease (women and girls, 1919), sane epileptics who were paupers (1916), and women with carcinoma of the uterus (1928).

During its lifetime, MAB set up around forty institutions, including a hospital for venereal diseases (1920), five children's hospitals, 10 ambulance and river ambulance stations, and three research and pathology laboratories. At the time of its dissolution it was responsible for 38 hospitals which provided 22,572 beds. Of these beds, 9,387 were for the treatment of the mentally disordered and feeble minded and 8,421 were in isolation fever hospitals.

=== Metropolitan Asylums Board hospitals ===
Thirty three general and special hospitals were transferred from the Metropolitan Asylums Board to the London County Council on 1 April 1930 under the Local Government Act 1929.

At the time of transfer there were 38 hospitals and colonies providing 22,572 beds. The largest number of beds were for the treatment of the mentally disordered and feeble minded (9,387), and the isolation and treatment of fever diseases (8,421).

Contractors to M.A.B. included the Brightside Foundry & Engineering Co. Ltd, Sheffield who made and installed the North Eastern Hospital's power plant.

Type of hospital	Name of hospital	Location	Date of opening	Number of beds
Isolation				
Fever (Note: The term 'fever' includes scarlet fever, typhoid, typhus, plague and cholera.)	Brook	Shooter's Hill, SE18	1896	552
Fever	Eastern	Homerton Grove, E9	1871	561
Fever	Grove	Tooting Grove, SW17	1899	556
Fever	North-Eastern	St. Ann's Road, N15	1892	661
Fever	North-Western	Lawn Road, NW3	1870	410
Fever	Park	Hither Green, SE13	1897	612
Fever	South-Eastern	Avonley Road, SE14	1877	511
Fever	South-Western	Landor Road, SW9	1871	323
Fever	Western	Seagrove Road, SW6	1877	479
Convalescent (fever)	Northern	Winchmore Hill, N21	1887	562
Convalescent (fever)	Southern (Upper)	Dartford, Kent]	1890	777
Convalescent (fever)	Southern (Lower)	Dartford, Kent	1902	767
Fever or Smallpox	Joyce Green	Dartford, Kent	1903	986
Fever or Smallpox	Orchard	Dartford, Kent	1902	664
Smallpox	Long Reach Pier Buildings	Dartford, Kent	1902	48
Smallpox	Long Reach	Dartford, Kent	1902	200
Opthalmia Neonatorum	St. Margaret's	Leighton Road, NW5	1918	60
Venereal Diseases	Sheffield St.	Kingsway, WC2	1920	52
Tuberculosis	King George V Sanatorium	Godalming, Surrey	1922	232
Tuberculosis	Pinewood	Wokingham, Berks	1919	160
Tuberculosis	Colindale	Hendon, NW9	1920	349
Tuberculosis	Grove Park	Lee, SE12	1926	322
Tuberculosis	St. George's Home	Chelsea, SW10	1914	50
Tuberculosis	St. Luke's	Lowestoft, Suffolk	1922	205
Tuberculosis	Princess Mary Hospital for Children	Margate, Kent	1898	271
Tuberculosis	High Wood Hospital for Children	Brentwood, Essex	1904	370
Tuberculosis	Milfield	Rustington, Sussex	1904	98
Children's	Queen Mary's Hospital for Children	Carshalton, Surrey	1909	900
Children's	The Down's Hospital for Children	Sutton, Surrey	1903	360
Children's	St. Anne's Convalescent Home	Herne Bay, Kent	1897	150
Children's	Goldie Leigh Homes (skin diseases)	Abbeywood, SE2	1914	218
Children's	White Oak (ophthalmia and interstitial keratis)	Swanley, Kent	1903	364
Mental	Tooting Bec	Tooting Bec, SW17	1903	2,230
Mental	Leavesden	Abbot's Langley, Herts	1870	2,159
Mental	Caterham	Caterham, Surrey	1870	2,068
Mental	Fountain	Tooting Grove, SW17	1893	670
Training colony	Training Colony for Imbeciles and Feeble Minded	Darenth, Kent	1878	2,260
Colony for Sane Epileptics	Colony for Sane Epileptics (Men and Boys)	Silver Street, Edmonton, N18	1916	355

== See also ==
- Diseases Prevention (Metropolis) Act 1883
- Leavesden Hospital
- South Eastern Hospital
