= Alfred Thomson =

English artist

Alfred Reginald Thomson
- Born: Alfred Reginald Thomson; 10 December 1894; Bangalore, India
- Died: 27 October 1979 (aged 84); Chelsea, London
- Education: London Art School
- Known for: Painting, poster design

Olympic medal record

Art competitions
Gold medal – first place	1948 London	Painting

Alfred Reginald Thomson RA (10 December 1894 – 27 October 1979) was an English artist and Olympic gold medalist for painting, most notable for being an official War Artist to the Royal Air Force during World War II. He was deaf from birth.

== Biography ==
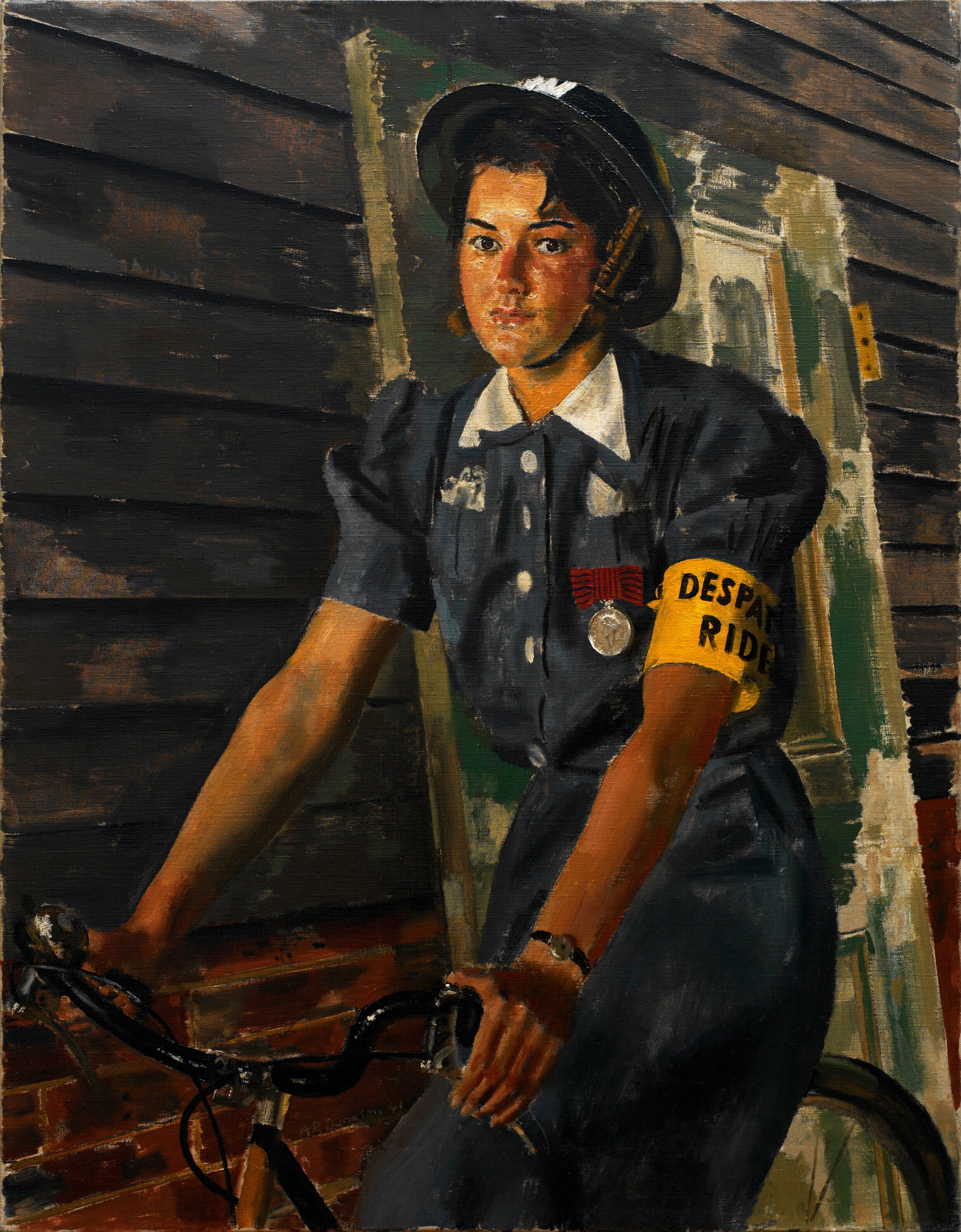
Thomson's portrait of George Medal holder Charity Bick

Thomson was born in Bangalore in India, where his father George was a British civil servant who had married an Irish woman, Florence Green. Thomson was deaf from birth, and when the family returned to Britain from India he attended the Royal School for Deaf Children at Margate. There, he learnt sign language. By the time he was 13, he was already six feet tall. His father was unhappy that he had not learnt to speak well, and transferred him to a small private oral school run by a Mr Barber at Brondesbury. Later in life he was known, in the press, as the "deaf and dumb" artist.

Although Thomson attended the London Art School in Kensington for a time, under C.M.Q. Orchardson, a son of William Quiller Orchardson, and was tutored by John Hassall, he failed to pass the exam for entry into the Royal Academy School. His father sent him to work on a farm in Lenham, Kent, and forbade him from doing any art. He left the farm, finding his first paid work designing posters at Vitagraph, in Long Acre, for a whisky company. He also created a series of posters for Daimler Cars.

At the end of the First World War, Thomson established himself as a commercial artist and figure painter. In the 1930s he created a series of murals for the Duncannon Hotel in London. He also had a talent as a caricaturist and he drew his fellow artists and friends.

Thomson completed a number of commissions for the War Artists' Advisory Committee during World War Two. In September 1942, he became a full-time salaried artist attached to the Air Ministry, taking over the post that Eric Kennington had resigned from. Thomson painted several portraits of RAF air crews and also medical and civil defence subjects. His portrait of Dame Emily Blair DBE RRC, matron-in-chief of Princess Mary’s RAF Nursing Service, was exhibited at the Royal Academy in 1944 and is held by the Royal Air Force Museum.

In 1945, Thomson was elected to the Royal Academy and soon became a highly respected society portrait painter. He also continued to paint murals, most notably for the Science Museum and the London Dental School. In the 1948 Olympic Games in London, he became the last person to win a Gold Medal for painting, as medals for art were abandoned in subsequent Olympic games.
