= London Fever Hospital =

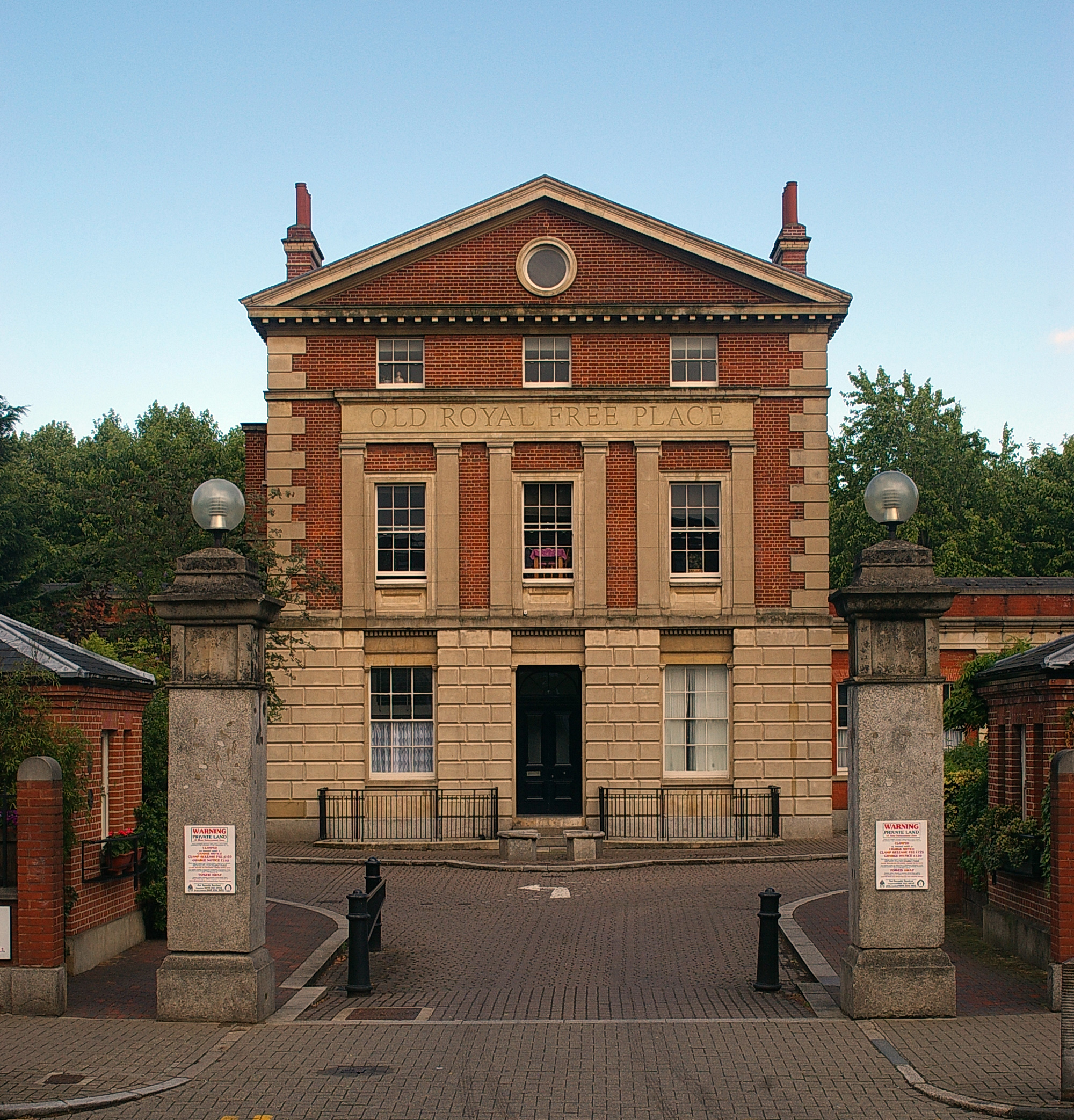
- London Fever Hospital

- Location within Islington

Geography
- Location: Islington, London, England, United Kingdom
- Coordinates: 51.5368°N 0.1064°W

Organisation
- Care system: NHS England

History
- Founded: 1802
- Closed: 1975

Links
- Lists: Hospitals in England

The London Fever Hospital was a voluntary hospital financed from public donations in Liverpool Road in Islington, London. It was one of the first fever hospitals in the country.

== History ==
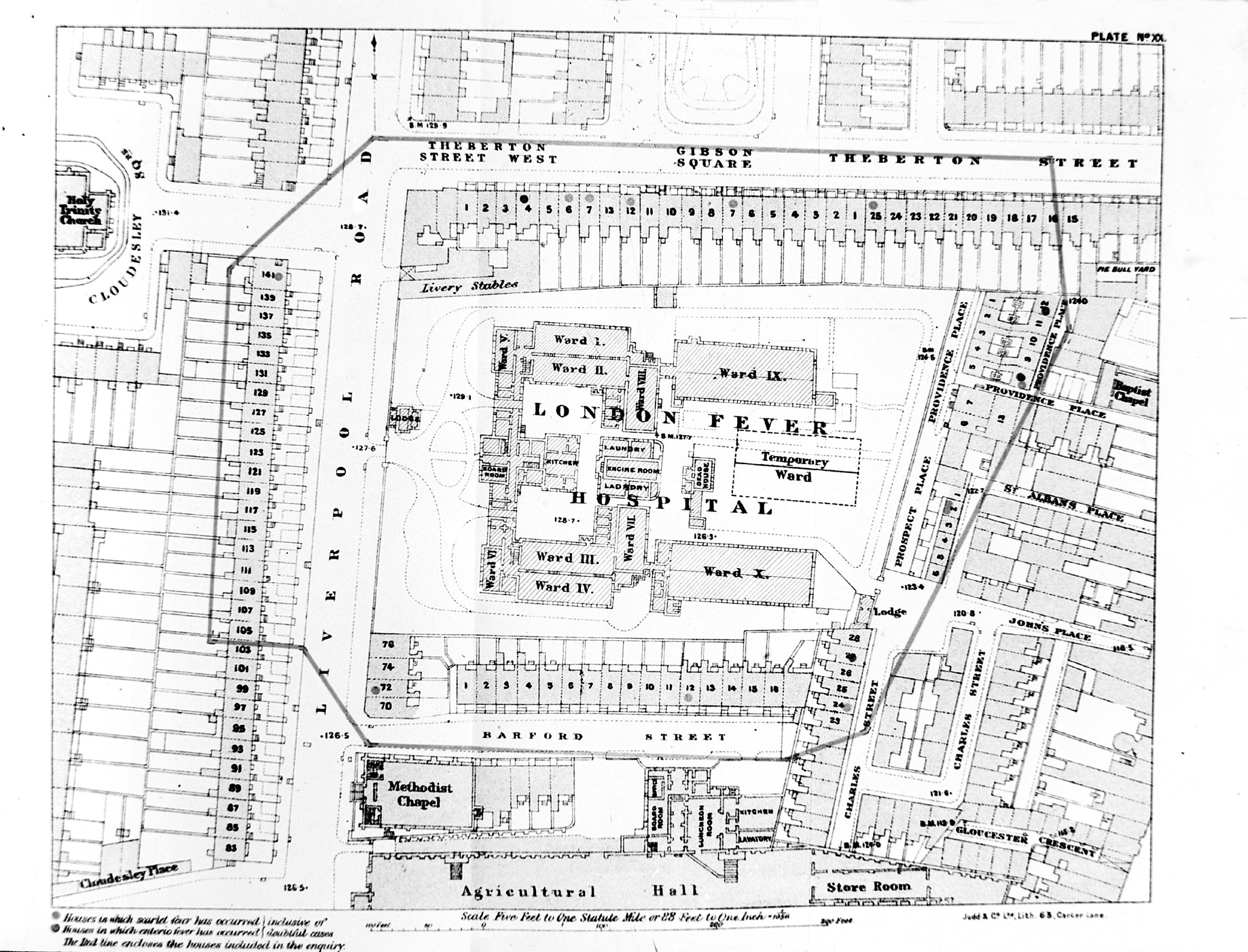
19th century plan of the hospital

Originally established with 15 beds in 1802 in Gray's Inn Road, it moved in 1815 to the west wing of the Smallpox Hospital at Battle Bridge where it had 120 beds.

After the Northern Railway bought the original site for King's Cross station the compensation money paid enabled the charity to commission a new Hospital on Kettle Field, a 4-acre site in Liverpool Road, Islington with 200 beds. The new hospital, which was designed by Charles Fowler, opened in 1848. By 1924 it had about 150 beds. A new wing was opened by the Duchess of York in 1928 and a new isolation block was opened by the Duke of Kent in 1938.

In 1948, the hospital joined the National Health Service under the same management as the Royal Free Hospital. After services had been transferred to the Royal Free Hospital, the hospital closed in 1975.

== Notable staff ==
- Laura Margaret Holroyde, Royal Red Cross and bar (1881-1958), Matron from about June 1921 until 1946. Holroyde trained at The London Hospital under Matron Eva Luckes between 1909-1911. She continued to work at the hospital until 1917 in various positions as a holiday sister, then night sister. During that time she also completed her midwifery training. Prior to her appointment at the Fever Hospital she was matron of the Royal Flying Corps Hospital / Royal Air Force Hospital in Eaton Square, London. These hospitals were part of the fledgling Royal Air Force Temporary Nursing Service (RAFNS) which was created in 1918. She was a founding member of the College of Nursing, now the Royal College of Nursing.

== See also ==
- Grove Fever Hospital
