= Poor Law Medical Officers Association =

British medical association

The Poor Law Medical Officers Association was formed in 1868 by a merger of the Poor Law Medical Reform Association and the Association of Metropolitan Workhouse Medical Officers.

Joseph Rogers was the founder and for some time president.

== See also ==
- Metropolitan Poor Act 1867
- Medical officer of health
