= Poor Law Amendment Act 1867 =

Act of the Parliament of the United Kingdom

Poor Law Amendment Act 1867 (Note: Section 30.)
- Act of Parliament
- Parliament of the United Kingdom
- Long title: An Act to make the Poor Law Board permanent, and to provide sundry Amendments in the Laws for the Relief of the Poor.
- Citation: 30 & 31 Vict. c. 106
- Territorial extent: United Kingdom

Dates
- Royal assent: 20 August 1867
- Commencement: 20 August 1867 (Note: Section 1.)
- Repealed: 23 May 1950
Other legislation
Amended by	Lunacy Act 1890; Local Government Act 1894
Repealed by	Statute Law Revision Act 1893; Poor Law Act 1927; Local Government Act 1933; Fire Brigades Act 1938; National Health Service Act 1946; Statute Law Revision Act 1950

Status: Repealed

Text of statute as originally enacted

The Poor Law Amendment Act 1867 (30 & 31 Vict. c. 106) was an act of the Parliament of the United Kingdom, sponsored by Gathorne Gathorne-Hardy, 1st Earl of Cranbrook and supported by Henry Herbert, 4th Earl of Carnarvon, Florence Nightingale and the Association for the Improvement of the Infirmaries of London Workhouses.

== Subsequent developments ==
The whole act, so far as unrepealed, was repealed by section 1(1) of, and the first schedule to, the Statute Law Revision Act 1950 (14 Geo. 6. c. 6), which came into force on 23 May 1950.

== Bibliography ==
- Lely, John Mounteney. The Statutes of Practical Utility. (Chitty's Statutes). Fifth Edition. Sweet and Maxwell. Stevens and Sons. London. 1895. Volume 9. Pages 171 to 177.
- Paterson, William (ed). The Practical Statutes of the Session 1867. Horace Cox. London. 1867. Page 248.
- The Statutes: Revised Edition. 1878. Volume 15. Pages xvi and 535 to 541.
- Halsbury's Statutes of England. (The Complete Statutes of England). 1929. Volume 12. Pages 922, 961, 966, 986, 988, 996, 1024, 1031. Google Books.
- Encyclopedia of Local Government Law: Exclusive of the Metropolis. Butterworths. 1906. Volume 3. Pages 266 and 279 to 284. Google Books.
- Jennings, Ivor. The Poor Law Code. Charles Knight & Company, Limited. 1930. Page xxxiii. Google Books.
- Herbert Jenner Fust. Poor Law Orders. P S King & Son. 2nd Ed. 1907. pp 7, 59, 440, 630, 700, 753. Google Books.
- Mackay, Thomas. A History of the English Poor Law. P S King & Son. 1904. Volume 3. Page 493. Google Books.
- "The New Poor Law Act" in "New Statutes" (1867) 7 Law Students' Examination Chronicle 216
- Danby Palmer Fry. The Union Assessment Acts, 1862 to 1880, and the Rating Act, 1874: With Introduction, Notes, Circulars of the Poor Law Board and Local Government Board, Digest of Decided Cases, and Index. Sixth Edition. 1880. Pages 128 and 129.
- Lunacy Law. By Danby Palmer Fry. Edited by George Frederick Chambers. Third Edition. Knight & Co. London. 1890. Pages 71 and 116
