= George and Dragon, Fitzrovia =

Pub in Fitzrovia, London

Coordinates: 51.522959°N 0.142092°W

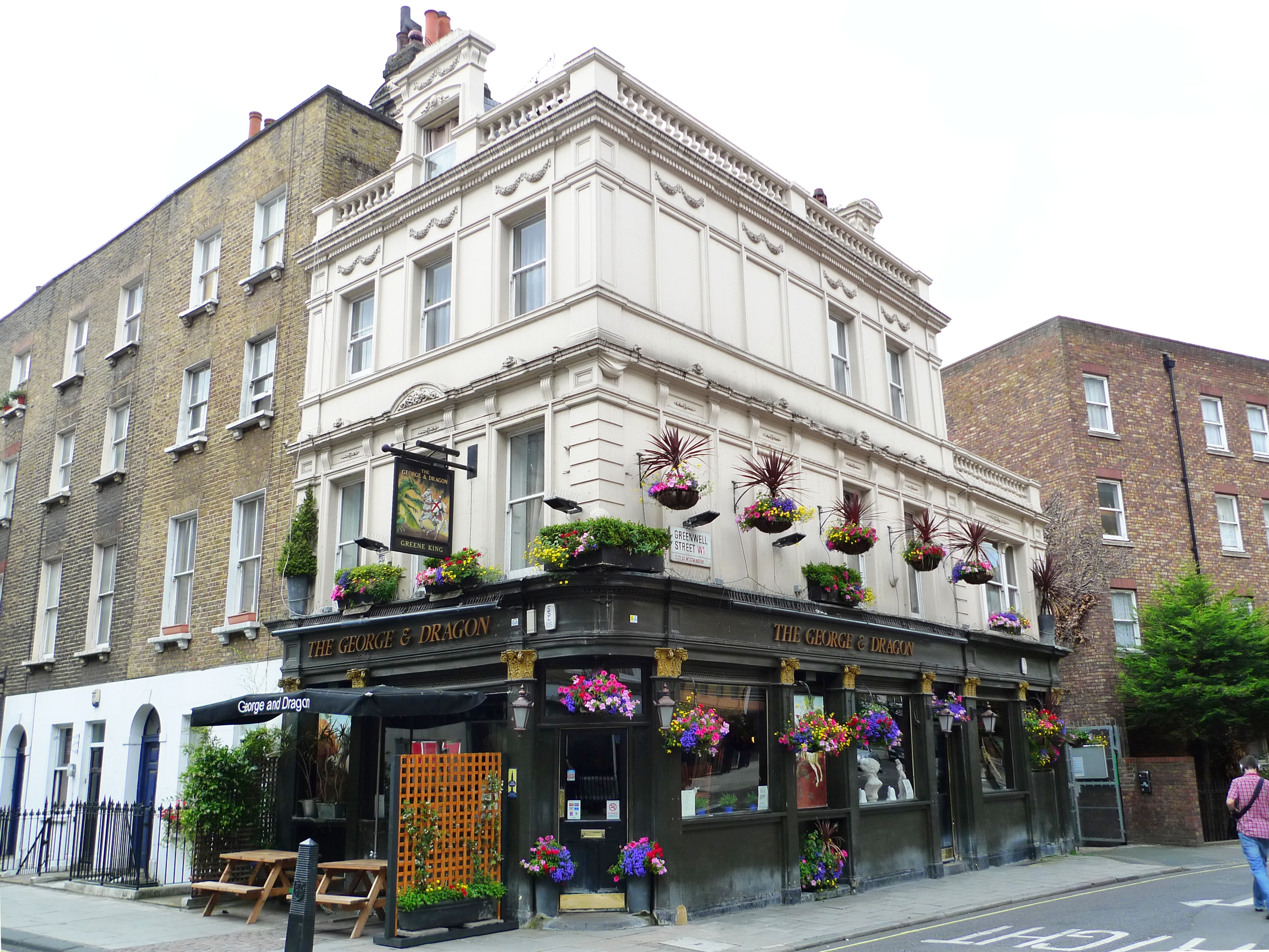
George and Dragon, Fitzrovia

The George and Dragon is a Grade II listed public house at 151 Cleveland Street, Fitzrovia, London W1T 6QN.

It was built in about 1850.
