= Cleveland Street, London =

Street in central London

Cleveland Street
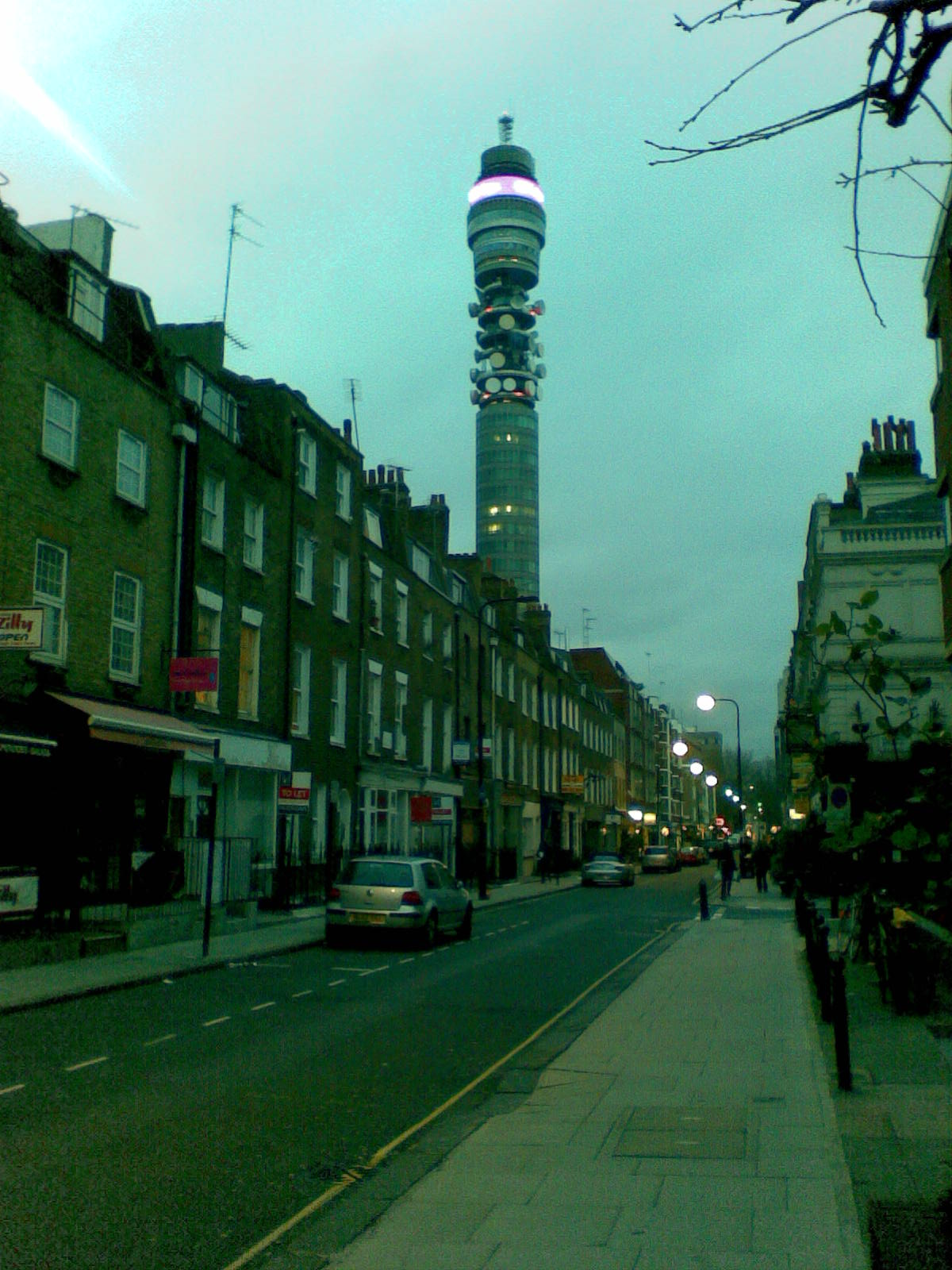
- A view of Cleveland Street looking south from the intersection with Greenwell Street (previously Buckingham Street), featuring the BT Tower
- Interactive map of Cleveland Street
- Namesake: Charles FitzRoy, 2nd Duke of Cleveland
- Length: 0.4 mi (0.64 km)
- Postal code: W1
- Nearest Tube station: Great Portland Street
- Coordinates: 51.520867°N 0.139196°W
- north end: Euston Road
- south end: Goodge Street

Cleveland Street in central London runs north to south from Euston Road (A501) to the junction of Mortimer Street and Goodge Street. It lies within Fitzrovia, in the W1 post code area. Cleveland Street also runs along part of the border between Bloomsbury (ward) which is located in London Borough of Camden, and West End (ward) in the City of Westminster. In the 17th century, the way was known as the Green Lane, when the area was still rural, or Wrastling Lane, after a nearby amphitheatre for boxing and wrestling.

== Geography ==
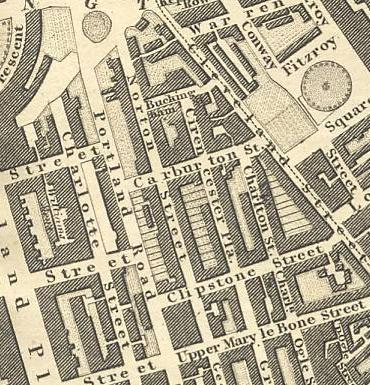
Cleveland Street as seen on Greenwood's map of the area in the late 1820s

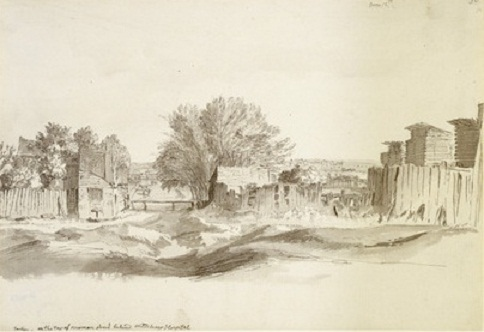
Area before Cleveland Street (Norfolk St) was laid out in 1774

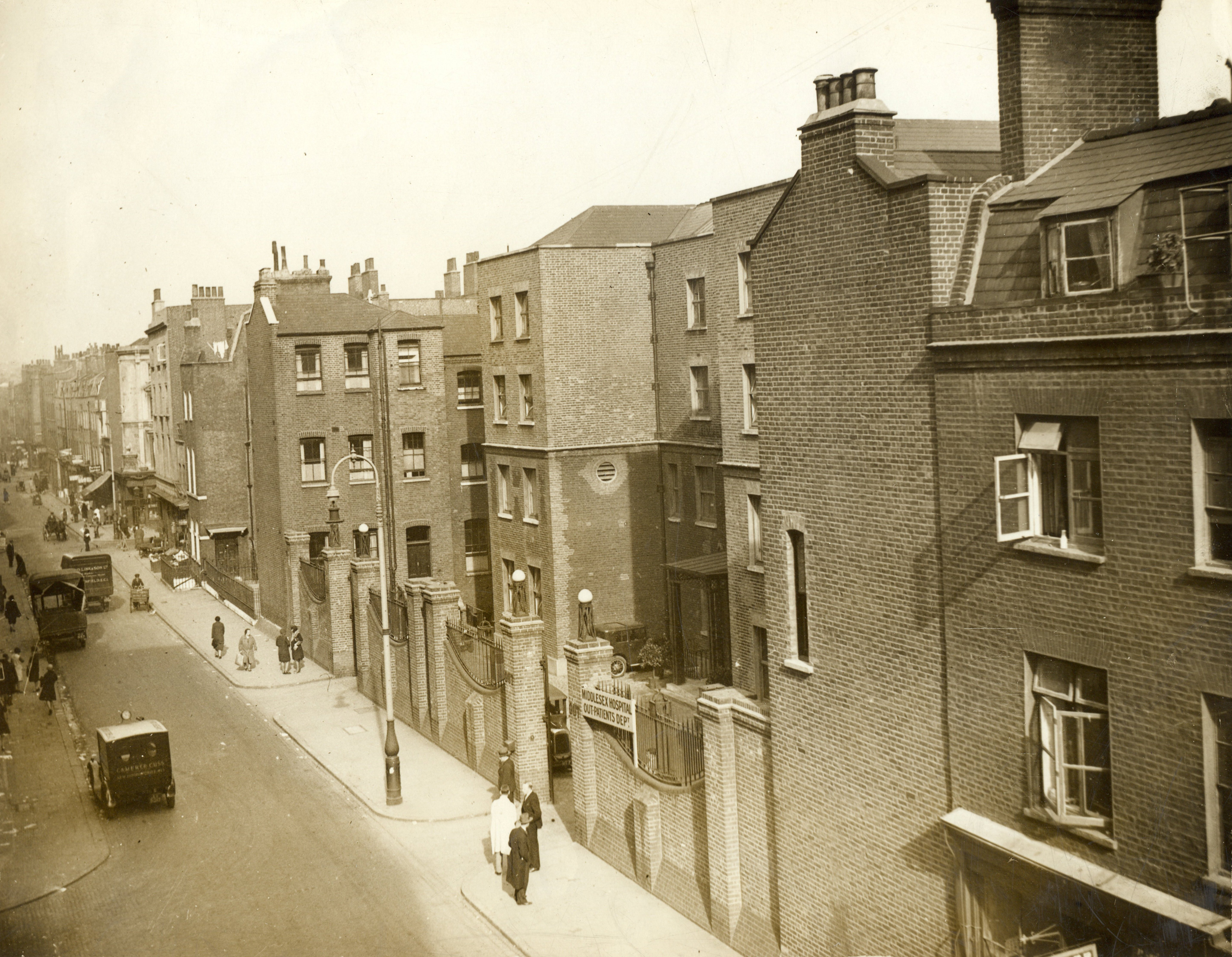
Cleveland Street Work House London

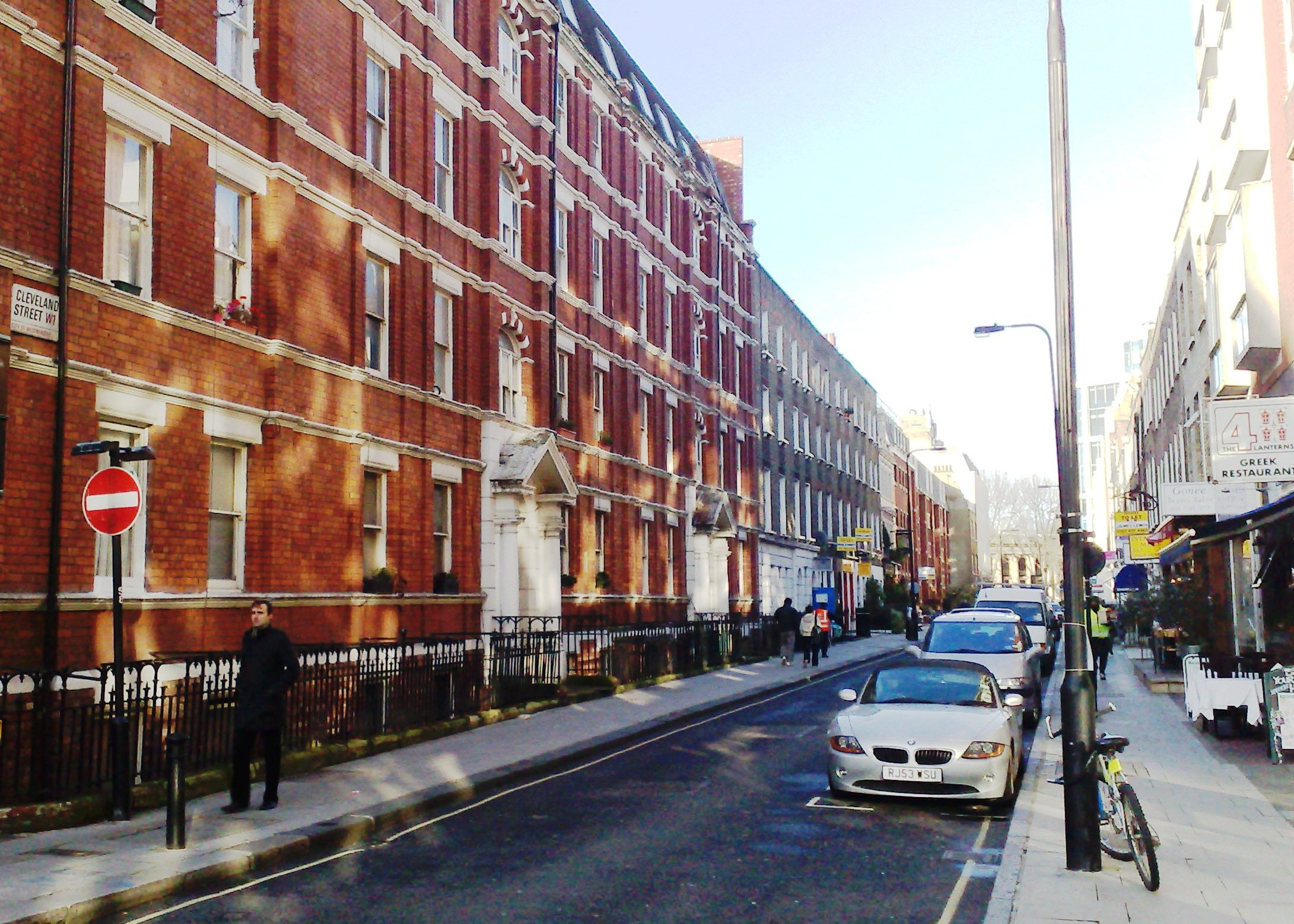
Cleveland Street Conservation Area

Cleveland Street marks the border between the City of Westminster to its west and the London Borough of Camden to the east. This border is ancient, largely following the old divide between the western parish of Saint Marylebone and the parish of Saint Pancras to the east and can be traced back as far as 1792. The street was also a boundary between large estates, such as the Bedford Estate and the Berners Estate. Maps show that the southern end of modern Cleveland Street, beyond Riding House Street, was known as Upper Newman Street and then Norfolk Street. The northern section was once known as Upper Cleveland Street and Buckingham Place.

It became Cleveland Street for its full length after a renumbering was ordered by the Metropolitan Board of Works in 1867.

The name comes from the Charles FitzRoy, 2nd Duke of Cleveland whose estate was connected in the 19th century with the Southampton (Wriothesley) property via Henry Fitzroy, 1st Duke of Grafton. The Southampton property later became the Bedford Estate.

Cleveland Street is renowned for several historical events and buildings, the most notable recent one being the BT Tower.

== History ==
The street is most notably associated with the Cleveland Street Scandal of 1889–90, which involved a male brothel in a terrace house at Number 19 (long demolished). The scandal was rumoured to involve the heir-presumptive to the throne, Prince Albert Victor, Duke of Clarence and Avondale, but the allegation has never been substantiated.

== Notable buildings ==
The Grade II listed buildings are numbers:

- 16-22 (terraced houses with attached shop, the first with later shop; c.1780-1800). No 22 (originally 10 Norfolk Street before the street's renumbering), was twice the home of Charles Dickens.
- 54 was Cleveland Hall which was constructed as a radical meeting place as a bequest from William Devonshire Saull. Secularists, spiritualists and anarchists met there until the hall was converted into a mission hall for the West London Methodist Mission in 1890.
- 68 (terraced house with shop c.1780-1800)
- 106 (terraced house and shop 1832–5)
- 45-49 (block of flats dated 1911 with red brick with blue brick banding and stone dressings, tiled roof in the Arts and Crafts free style)
- 139, 141 (terraced houses c.1790-1800). The latter has a blue plaque signifying that Samuel Morse, inventor of the Morse Code once lived there.
- 143-149 (terraced houses, some with shops c.1790-1800)
- 151 (George and Dragon corner public house c. 1850 rebuild or recasting)
- The BT Tower complex. The tower was London tallest building when it was completed in 1960 and it remains a major London landmark, being currently the 8th tallest building in London at 177 metres plus a 12-metre antenna.
- The frontage building of the former Cleveland Street workhouse later Middlesex Hospital annexe and outpatient department on the eastern side of the street at 44 c.1776. Over the years from 1778 until 2005 the building operated as a workhouse then a workhouse infirmary and more recently as a hospital. UCLH NHS Foundation Trust in 2010 proposed the building's demolition in a planning application (and conservation area consent) submitted to Camden London Borough Council to replace it with a large building mixing private accommodation with commercial space. However adjoining Westminster City Council objected on three grounds on 2 December 2010.

The Cleveland Street Workhouse is of particular importance in light of the fact that Charles Dickens is known to have lived nearby in what is now 22 Cleveland Street. Dickens lived there as a young child between 1815 and 1816 and then again as a teenager between 1828 and 1831. His residence in the street has led to the suggestion that the nearby workhouse was probably the inspiration for Oliver Twist.

Cleveland Street hosted the Middlesex Hospital, closed in 2005 and since demolished. The hospital occupied an entire block on the western side of the southern section of the street. The future of this site is currently uncertain, despite its sale by nationalised Icelandic Kaupthing Bank to Aviva Investors and Exemplar Properties.

Cleveland Street was described as an area of special architectural and historic interest when it was designated a Conservation Area on 20 November 1990. Anomalously on its Camden side Cleveland Street is part of two conservation areas: the Fitzroy Square conservation area, and the Charlotte Street conservation area. This double designation is rare and possibly unique.

== See also ==
- List of eponymous roads in London
