= Poor Law Medical Reform Association =

British medical association

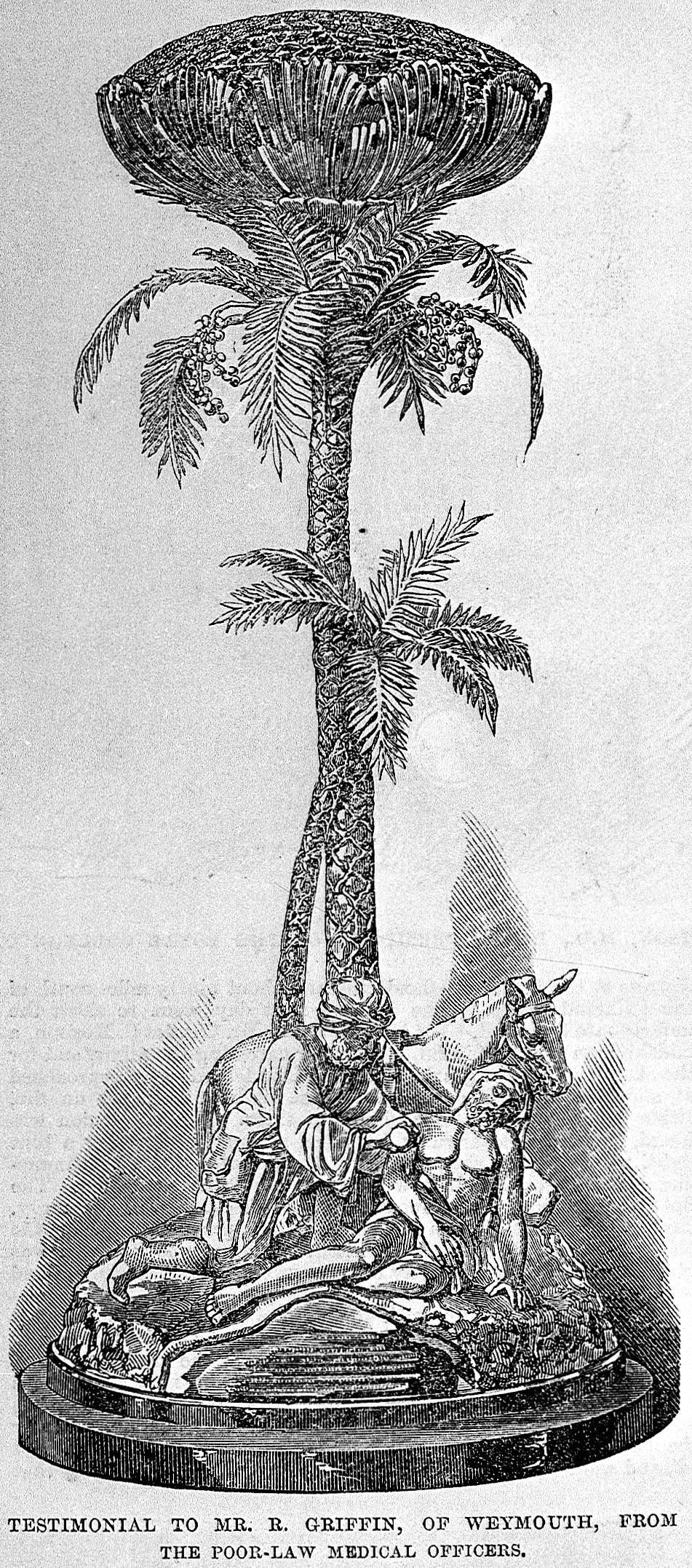
Testimonial to Mr. Richard Griffin, from the Poor-Law Medical Officers in 1866

The Poor Law Medical Reform Association was founded by Dr. Richard Griffin, the medical officer of the Weymouth Poor law union in 1853. It merged with the Convention of Poor Law Medical Officers in 1856. In 1868 it merged with the Association of Metropolitan Workhouse Medical Officers to create the Poor Law Medical Officers Association.

In 1859 it produced a pamphlet "The Grievances of the Poor-Law Medical Officers."

Griffin, as Chairman of the Association, was a vigorous lobbyist in the campaign which led up to the Metropolitan Poor Act 1867 (30 & 31 Vict. c. 6).

== See also ==
- Opposition to the English Poor Laws
