= Veronica Ashworth =

British nurse, midwife and RAF officer (1910–1977)

Dame Veronica Ashworth
- Wing Officer Ashworth in the 1960s
- Born: 25 December 1910
- Died: 12 January 1977 (aged 66)
- Military career
- Allegiance: United Kingdom
- Branch: Royal Air Force
- Service years: 1936–1966
- Rank: Air Commandant
- Commands: Princess Mary's Royal Air Force Nursing Service (1963–66)
- Conflicts: Second World War
- Awards: Dame Commander of the Order of the British Empire; Royal Red Cross

Air Commandant Dame Veronica Margaret Ashworth, DBE, RRC (25 December 1910 – 12 January 1977) was a British nurse, midwife, and Royal Air Force officer. From 1963 to 1966, she was matron-in-chief of Princess Mary's Royal Air Force Nursing Service.

== Early life and education ==
Ashworth was born on 25 December 1910. She was educated at St Katharine's School, an all-girls private school in Wantage, Oxfordshire. She trained as a nurse at St Bartholomew's Hospital, London from 1930, becoming a state registered nurse in 1934, and then moved to Leeds Maternity Hospital, becoming a state certified midwife in 1935.

== Military career ==
Ashworth joined the Princess Mary's Royal Air Force Nursing Service in 1936, and after training was appointed to the permanent service on 1 April 1937. During the Second World War, she served in Algiers, Tunisia and Italy, with a mobile field hospital.

Ashworth served as matron of the hospitals at RAF Wroughton and RAF Uxbridge in England, and at RAF Fayid in Egypt. She was awarded a permanent commission in the Royal Air Force on 1 February 1949 with the rank of flight officer. She was promoted to wing officer on 1 January 1958, awarded the Royal Red Cross in the 1959 Queen's Birthday Honours, and made group officer on 1 January 1961. On 4 August 1963, she was appointed Matron-in-Chief of the Princess Mary's Royal Air Force Nursing Service and made an acting air commandant. She was promoted to air commandant and made an Honorary Nursing Sister to the Queen on 1 September 1963, and appointed a Dame Commander of the Order of the British Empire in the 1964 New Year Honours. She stepped down as Matron-in-Chief in 1966, and retired from the Royal Air Force.
