= Cleveland Street Workhouse =

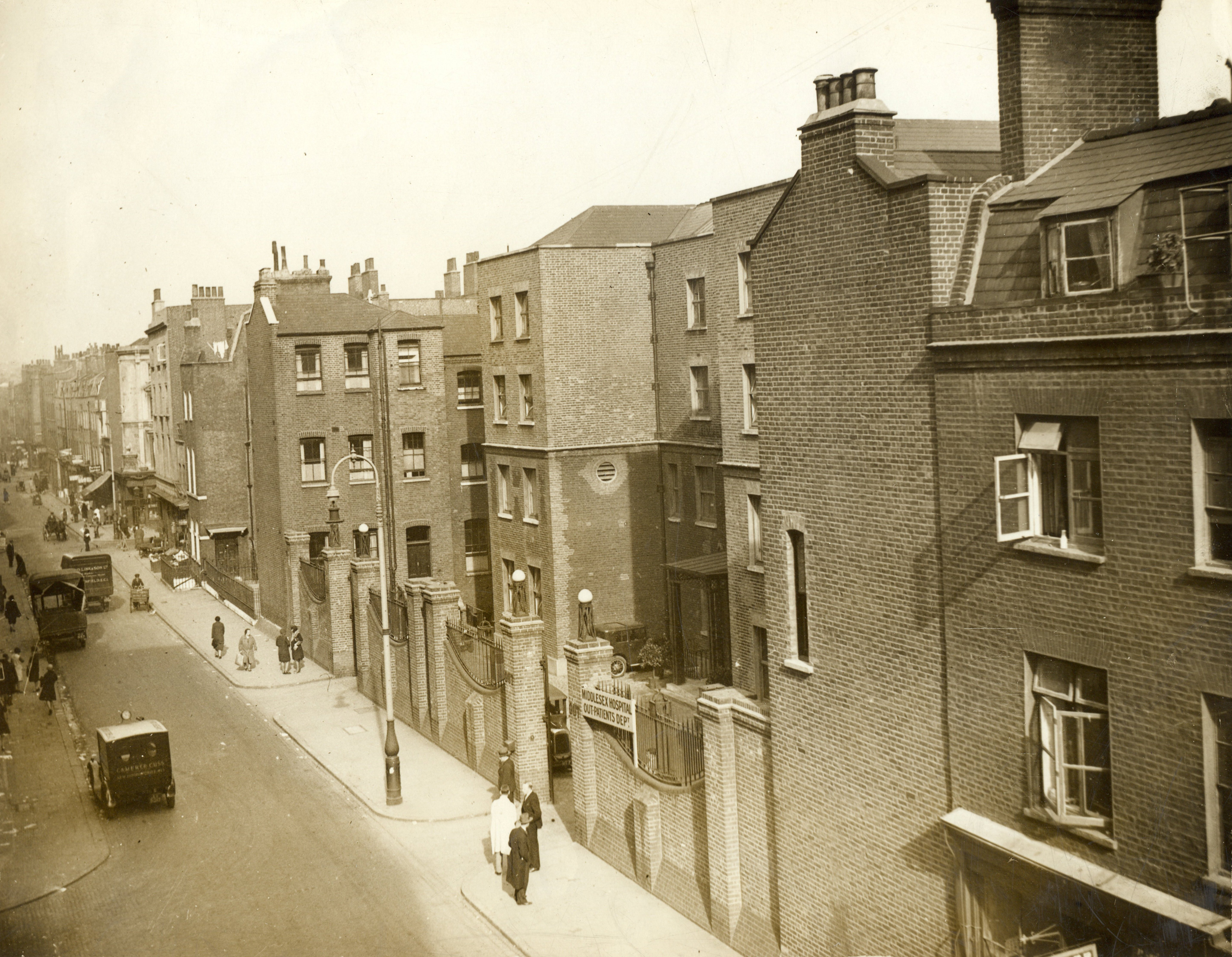
- 5 December 1930 postcard of Cleveland Street showing the workhouse, now the Middlesex Hospital Outpatient Department

- Location within Greater London

General information
- Status: Listed building (Grade II)
- Type: Workhouse
- Location: 44 Cleveland Street, London, England
- Coordinates: 51.5204°N 0.1383°W
- Completed: 1778

Technical details
- Floor count: Four

Design and construction
- Architect: Edward Palmer

The Cleveland Street Workhouse is a Georgian property in Cleveland Street, Marylebone, built between 1775 and 1778 for the care of the sick and poor of the parish of St Paul Covent Garden under the Old Poor Law. From 1836, it became the workhouse of the Strand Union of parishes. The building remained in operation until 2005 after witnessing the complex evolution of the healthcare system in England. After functioning as a workhouse, the building became a workhouse infirmary before being acquired by the Middlesex Hospital and finally falling under the NHS. In the last century it was known as the Middlesex Hospital Annexe and the Outpatient Department. It closed to the public in 2005 and it has since been vacated. On 14 March 2011 the entire building became Grade II Listed. Development of the site began in 2019 by current owner University College London Hospitals (UCLH) Charity as a mixed-use development including residential, commercial and open space, but construction has been held up by the necessity to remove human remains stemming from the use of the area around the workhouse as a parish burial ground between 1780 and 1853. There has also been controversy about the amount of social housing to be included in the development.

== Origin ==
The Cleveland Street Workhouse was built on an H plan on the eastern side of Cleveland Street between 1775 and 1778 by the parish of St Paul Covent Garden, on land leased from the Bedford Estate. The construction of the building resulted from the intercession of the Duke of Bedford's steward Robert Palmer, who together with Duchess Gertrude planned and realized the construction of Bedford Square and Gower Street.

The original act of Parliament, Saint Paul, Covent Garden (Poor Relief) Act 1775 (15 Geo. 3. c. 50) was obtained in May 1775. The building was initially designed to accommodate 200 paupers, but the plan was modified prior to construction to accommodate a greater number.

Construction began that same year and by 1778 the building was already completed and fully occupied. Shortly afterwards, permission was sought from the landowner the Duke of Bedford, to use part of the site as a burial ground for the parish, as authorized by the act of Parliament. The ground was consecrated in 1790.

That same decade the church of St Paul's, Covent Garden, which was built by Inigo Jones in 1631–33, was renovated (following a fire) by the eminent architect Thomas Hardwick. Hardwick was a famous church architect: he restored Sir Christopher Wren’s St James, Piccadilly and re-built George Dance the Younger's St Bartholomew-the-Less in West Smithfield (1823–25), and he is also famous for designing the church of St Mary the Virgin at Wanstead (completed in 1790 – Grade I listed), St John's Church in St John's Wood High Street (1813–14) and the church of St Mary in Marylebone Road (1813–17), arguably his most notable work. In 1796, the trustees in charge of the restoration work of the church at Covent Garden employed Thomas Hardwick to design a new infectious ward and a new infirmary, built in 1802 and 1819.

== History ==
In 1829 the workhouse became independently managed and in 1836 it was entrusted to the Board of Guardians of the Strand Poor Law Union. This was the first in a long series of name changes: over the course of its history the building has been known as:

- St Paul Covent Garden Workhouse or simply Covent Garden Workhouse
- Strand Union Workhouse
- Central London Sick Asylum
- Cleveland Street Infirmary
- Middlesex Hospital Annexe
- Middlesex Hospital Outpatient Department

Despite its many names, the core function of the building has remained unaltered over more than two centuries: the vast majority of the paupers admitted while it was a workhouse were infirm (fewer than 8 per cent were able-bodied). When the workhouse facility was relocated to Edmonton (1876), the building served as an asylum for the mentally ill, before becoming an infirmary. It was finally incorporated into the Middlesex Hospital in 1926, which came under the management of the NHS in 1948. Even during the workhouse era the core function was to tend and care for the sick and infirm, since ill-health and infirmity was the main cause of pauperism. The building represents a unique example of a purpose-built Georgian workhouse that has remained in service to the sick and poor of London for more than 200 years.

An account of the appearance of the building in 1856 by its medical officer Joseph Rogers survives, matching the appearance of the building in modern days:

The Strand Workhouse in the year 1856 was a square four-storied building fronting the street, with two wings of similar elevation projecting eastwards from each corner ... in the yard, on each side of the entrance gate, was a building with an underground apartment ... with a door for the reception of male and female casual paupers; the wards above being for those of both sexes admitted to the house. The necessary laundry work of the establishment, which never in my time fell below 500 inmates, was carried on in the cellar beneath the entrance hall and the general dining room .... On the right side of the main building was a badly paved yard, which led down to the back entrance from Charlotte Street.

After the Annexe closed, the UCLH NHS Foundation Trust rented out the rooms to approximately 40 property guardians to prevent squatting. In 2010 the trust proposed the building's demolition in a planning application (and conservation area consent) submitted to Camden London Borough Council to replace it with a large building mixing private accommodation with commercial space. However adjoining Westminster City Council raised objections on three grounds on 2 December 2010. (Note: Westminster City Council objections were: 1. The City Council considers that the existing building is a heritage asset which makes a positive contribution to the character and appearance of the area. The proposed development would not preserve or enhance this character and appearance. The City Council considers that retention and refurbishment of all or a substantial part of the existing building should be pursued.; 2. The proposals provide insufficient on-street car parking facilities for the development, particularly for the private housing market which would generate significant car parking demand. This would increase the pressure for car parking on surrounding streets to the detriment of highway safety and convenience.; 3. The submitted Daylight, Sunlight and Shadow study shows that the proposed development would result in unacceptable losses of daylight for some of the residential properties on Cleveland Street which face the application site. This would be materially harmful to the local residential environment and lead to an unacceptable reduction in the quality of residential amenity.)

The Cleveland Street Workhouse is of particular importance in light of the fact that Charles Dickens is known to have lived nearby in what is now 22 Cleveland Street. Dickens lived there as a young child between 1815 and 1816, and then again as a teenager in 1828–1831. His residence in the street has led to the suggestion by historian Ruth Richardson that the nearby workhouse was probably the inspiration for Oliver Twist.

Archaeologists from MOLA (Museum of London Archaeology), L - P : Archaeology and Iceni Projects excavated approximately 1047 articulated skeletons, probably workhouse inmates, from the site, which will be reburied after they have been catalogued and studied.

=== Strand Poor Law Union ===
When the building was used as the Strand Union Workhouse from 1836, it was the workhouse for the union of the parishes and places of St Mary le Strand, the Precinct of the Savoy, St Paul Covent Garden, St Clement Danes, and the Liberty of the Rolls. From 1837 to 1868 it also included St Anne, Soho and the parish of St Martin-in-the-Fields was added in 1868. In 1913 it was replaced by the City of Westminster Poor Law Union.
