= Roberta Whyte =

British nurse

Dame Roberta Whyte
- Born: 6 June 1897
- Died: 25 January 1979 (aged 81)
- Military career
- Allegiance: United Kingdom
- Branch: Royal Air Force
- Service years: 1929–1956
- Rank: Air Commandant
- Commands: Princess Mary's Royal Air Force Nursing Service (1952–56)
- Conflicts: Second World War
- Awards: Dame Commander of the Order of the British Empire; Royal Red Cross

Air Commandant Dame Roberta Mary Whyte, DBE, RRC (6 June 1897 – 25 January 1979) was a British nurse and Royal Air force officer. From 1952 to 1956, she was matron-in-chief of Princess Mary's Royal Air Force Nursing Service.

She trained as a nurse at the King's College Hospital. After this she joined Princess Mary's Royal Air Force Nursing Service in 1929. She served until 1956, and, from 1952 to 1956, was matron-in-chief.

Whyte never married, and died in 1979, aged 81.

== Honours ==
- Royal Red Cross (1949)
- Queen's Honorary Nursing Sister (1952)
- Commander (Sister) of the Venerable Order of St John (1953)
- Dame Commander of the Order of the British Empire (1955)

Military offices
Preceded by Dame Helen Cargill	Matron-in-Chief Princess Mary's Royal Air Force Nursing Service; 1952–1956	Succeeded by Dame Alice Williamson
