= Joy Harris =

British nurse (1926–2021)

- Born: 26 September 1926
- Died: 14 August 2021 (aged 94)
- Military career
- Allegiance: United Kingdom
- Branch: Royal Air Force
- Service years: 1950–1984
- Rank: Air Commodore
- Commands: Princess Mary's Royal Air Force Nursing Service (1981–84)
- Awards: Companion of the Order of the Bath; Royal Red Cross; Officer of the Order of St John

Air Commodore Irene Joyce "Joy" Harris, CB, RRC (26 September 1926 – 14 August 2021) was a British nurse and Royal Air Force officer. Having trained as a nurse and midwife, she joined the Princess Mary's Royal Air Force Nursing Service (PMRAFNS) in 1950 and rose through the ranks to become its head. From 1981 to 1984, she was Director of Nursing Services (RAF) and Matron-in-Chief of the PMRAFNS.

== Military career ==
On 16 November 1950, Harris was commissioned in the Princess Mary's Royal Air Force Nursing Service as a flying officer, with seniority in that rank from 16 November 1948. She was promoted to flight officer (equivalent to flight lieutenant) on 15 November 1955. She served in the United Kingdom and overseas in Singapore, Germany and Cyprus.

In the 1977 New Year Honours, Harris was appointed Member of the Royal Red Cross (RRC). In 1980, she was appointed an Officer (Sister) of the Order of St John (OStJ). In the 1984 New Year Honours, she was appointed Companion of the Order of the Bath (CB).
