= Lyng, West Midlands =

Area of West Bromwich, West Midlands, England

Coordinates: 52.5130°N 2.0027°W

Lyng is a residential area of West Bromwich in the West Midlands of England. It is situated in the south of the town near the border with Oldbury - and part of Oldbury's Ring Road actually borders the southern part of the area.

Lyng was developed during the 19th century due to the Industrial Revolution that bought thousands of jobs to the local area. Hundreds of houses were built, but after the Second World War many of these homes were becoming unfit for human habitation. This resulted in extensive demolition work during the 1960s that saw the old homes replaced with new council-owned properties including several high-rise blocks of flats.

== Notable residents ==
- Charity Bick, youngest ever recipient of the George Medal
