= Charles Soutar =

British medical doctor and Royal Air Force officer

Sir Charles Soutar
- Born: 12 June 1920; Ilford, Essex
- Died: 15 July 2016 (aged 96)
- Military career
- Allegiance: United Kingdom
- Branch: Royal Air Force
- Service years: 1946–1981
- Rank: Air Marshal
- Commands: RAF Medical Services; RAF Institute of Aviation Medicine; RAF Hospital Halton
- Conflicts: Aden Emergency
- Awards: Knight Commander of the Order of the British Empire

Air Marshal Sir Charles John Williamson Soutar, KBE (12 June 1920 – 15 July 2016) was a British medical doctor and Royal Air Force officer. He served as Director General of RAF Medical Services from 1978 to 1981.

Charles John Williamson Soutar was born on 12 June 1920 in the English town of Ilford in the county of Essex. As a boy he attended the Brentwood School before going on to train to be a doctor at the London Hospital Medical School. Soutar joined the Royal Air Force in May 1946, and was appointed to a commission as a flight lieutenant in the Medical Branch on 6 January 1948.

During his service career he was Principal Medical Officer at Middle East Command 1967-68 (seeing active service during the Aden Emergency), Deputy Director of Medical Organisation 1968-70, Officer Commanding hospital at RAF Halton 1970-73, Commandant of the RAF Institute of Aviation Medicine 1973-75 and the Principal Medical Officer at Headquarters Strike Command 1975-78 before retiring from the RAF in 1981.
