= Association for the Improvement of the Infirmaries of London Workhouses =

The Association for the Improvement of the Infirmaries of London Workhouses was established on 3 March 1866 at a public meeting organised by Joseph Rogers, and Drs. Hart, Anstie and Carr of the Lancet. It was chaired by Henry Herbert, 4th Earl of Carnarvon. Charles Dickens and John Stuart Mill were present. It campaigned for the provision of six Poor Law hospitals in London of one thousand beds each, with trained nurses, resident medical officers, and medicines financed from the rates. Carnarvon denounced the dreadful and disgraceful conditions in workhouse infirmaries and the guardians responsible for them. He helped to pass the Poor Law Amendment Act 1867.

Louisa Twining, the Archbishop of York and two earls were among the members.

The Lancet Sanitary Commission of 1865–6, three eminent doctors, visited the major London workhouses, and published its findings in The Lancet. Their testimony spurred the establishment of the association.

Ernest Hart wrote An account of the condition of the infirmaries of London workhouses in 1866 which was printed for the Association by Chapman and Hall.
