= Laura Holroyde =

Laura Margaret Holroyde
- Born: 1881; Nottingham
- Died: 1958 (aged 76–77); Croydon, Surrey
- Education: The London Hospital
- Occupation: Nursing leader
- Honours: RRC and Bar

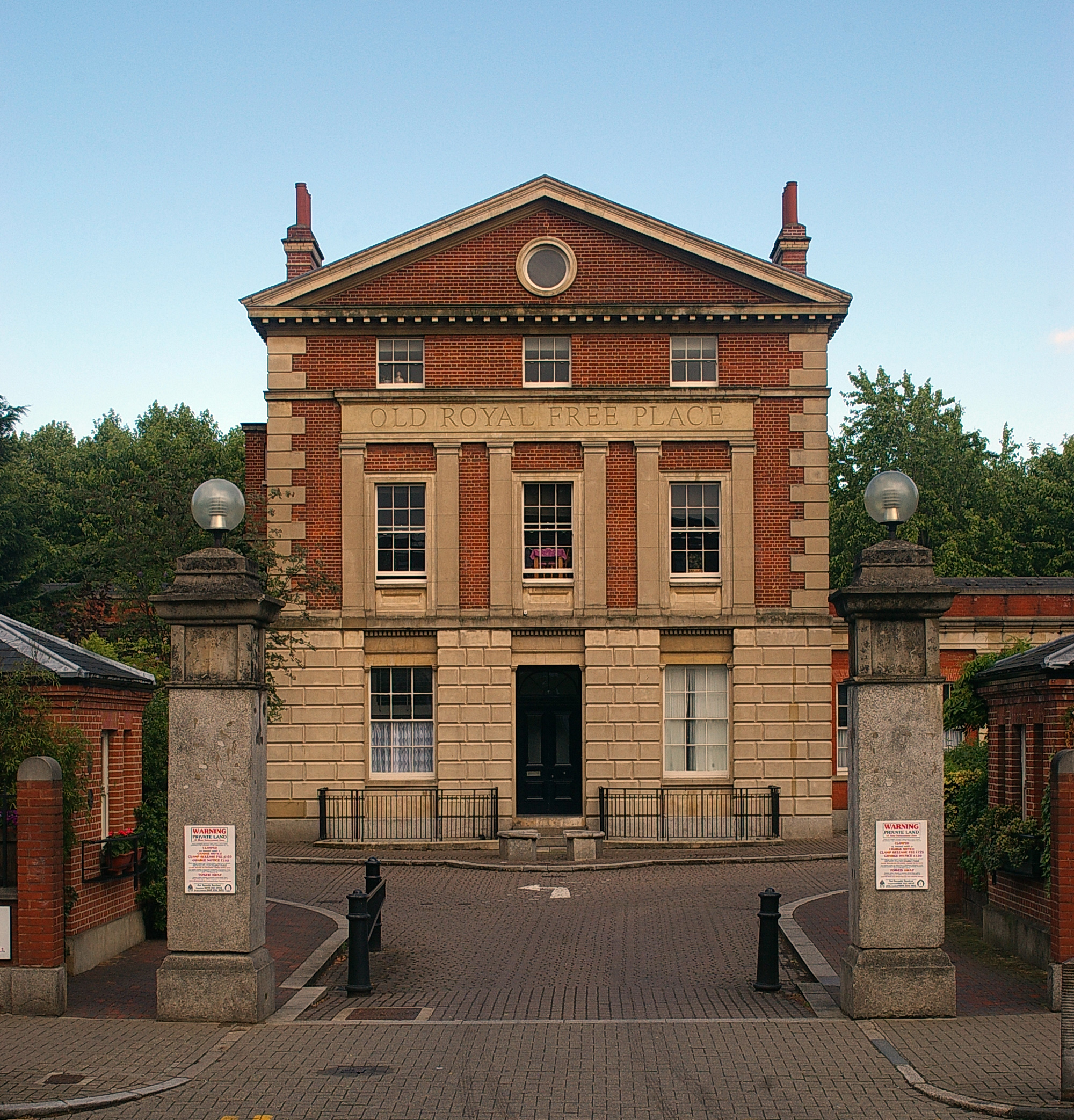
The London Fever Hospital

Laura Margaret Holroyde RRC and Bar (1881–1958), Military Matron during the First World Warr, Matron of the London Fever Hospital for over twenty five years, and founder member of the College of Nursing (now Royal College of Nursing).

== Early life ==
Hoyroyde was born on 6 August 1881 in Nottingham, to her parents Elkanah Holroyde, a clergyman in the Church of England and his wife Shaftesbury Violet Holroyde. When Holroyde was four her mother died at East Preston, Sussex and her father remarried a few years later.

== Nursing career ==
Holroyde trained as a nurse at The London Hospital under Eva Luckes between 1909 and 1911. She was immediately promoted to holiday sister and then night sister, before leaving to become matron of the Royal Flying Corps Hospital (subsequently the Royal Air Force Hospital), Eaton Square, London in 1917. She was awarded the Royal Red Cross in 1919. She joined the College of Nursing in 1919 as part of the lobbying for state registration of nurses.

In 1920 she was appointed Matron of the London Fever Hospital, Islington. In 1922 Holroyde was part of a delegation of Fever Hospital matrons who complained to the Minister of Health that following reorganisation there was no trained Fever Nurse on the General Nursing Council. In 1928 she was appointed as a final examiner for the examinations for the Fever Nurses Register.

Whilst she was matron during the London Blitz in the Second World War the hospital became a casualty clearing station.

== Retirement and death ==
In 1946 Holroyde retired after 26 years as matron of the London Fever Hospital. She died in a nursing home in Croydon on 14 July 1958, and was buried at Mitcham Road Cemetery on 17 July 1858. She left £7479 in her will.

== Honours ==
- Royal Red Cross
- Bar to Royal Red Cross
