= Charity Bick =

RAF servicewoman and George Medal recipient

Charity Anne Bick
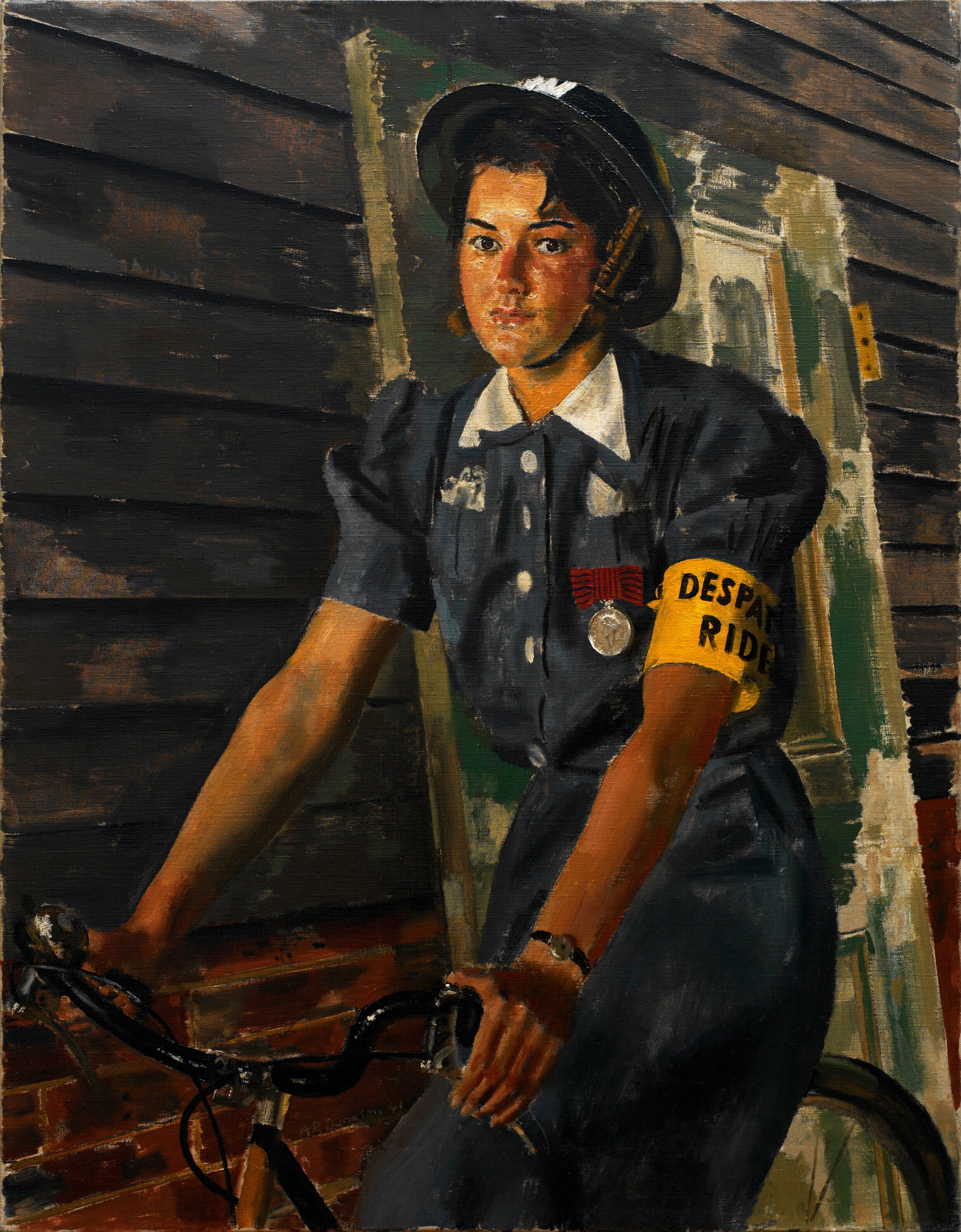
- Charity Bick (portrait by Alfred Thomson)
- Born: 19 December 1925; West Bromwich, England
- Died: 22 April 2002 (aged 76); Inverness, Scotland
- Occupations: Dispatch rider; WRAF warrant officer
- Known for: Youngest George Medal recipient

Charity Anne Bick GM (19 December 1925 – 22 April 2002) was an English civilian dispatch rider during the Second World War, and the youngest ever recipient of the George Medal, the United Kingdom's second-highest award for civilian bravery. She later served in the Women's Royal Air Force.

== Early life ==
Charity Anne Bick was born on 19 December 1925 (Note: Her war records list her birth as 19 December 1924) and educated at Lyng Primary School in Horton Street, Lyng, West Bromwich.

== George Medal ==
At the age of 14, while living in Maud Road, West Bromwich she lied about her age, claiming to be 16, to join the Air Raid Precautions (ARP) service in that town. She volunteered at the office of a brick works near her home, delivering messages between ARP depots, by bicycle. Her father was an ARP post warden, and her mother a Red Cross nurse.

During a air raid on West Bromwich, on 19 November 1940, she helped her father to put out an incendiary bomb that had lodged in the roof of a pawnbroker's shop. When the roof gave way, she fell through and suffered minor injuries. Nonetheless, she then used a borrowed bicycle and made numerous attempts to deliver a message to the control room, 1 1/4 miles (2.0 km) away, avoiding bombs and shrapnel. She made repeated trips, at least three of which occurred during the height of the raid.

Bick was awarded the George Medal (GM) for her bravery; the official citation, in The London Gazette of 14 February 1941, read:

During a very heavy air raid, Miss Bick played an heroic part under nerve-racking conditions. At the outset when incendiary bombs began to fall she assisted her father, a Post Warden, to put out one of these, in the roof of a shop, with the aid of a stirrup pump and bucket of water. The pump proved to be out of order, but nothing daunted she proceeded to splash the water with her hands and eventually put out the fire. While endeavouring to get out of the roof the charred rafters gave way and she fell through to the room below and sustained minor injuries.

Miss Bick and her father then returned to the A.R.P. Post. Almost immediately high explosive bombs began to fall and a terrific explosion nearly shook them off their feet. They discovered that a bomb had destroyed two houses opposite and another one nearby. The Wardens attached to the Post were all on duty, so she borrowed a bicycle and rushed out to take a message to the Control Room amidst shrapnel from guns and falling bombs. She made repeated attempts to get through and several times had to dismount and fall flat on the ground for safety. Covered with dirt and grime she eventually delivered the message.

She made three journeys from her Post to the Control Room, a distance of approximately one and a quarter miles, during the height of the raid, and made further journeys afterwards.

Miss Bick, by acting as a means of communication between the Wardens' Post to which she was attached and the Control Room, did very valuable work and released other Wardens for duty. She displayed outstanding courage and coolness in very trying circumstances.

Aged 15, she was the youngest person ever to receive the GM, for her actions when she was 14. The medal was presented to her by King George VI in a ceremony on 10 September 1941. She also received the Defence Medal and War Medal at the end of the war.

== Later life ==
Bick was subsequently known as "Jimmie", from the honorific "GM".

She was posted to Kinross, Scotland, in 1944 as an electrician in the Women's Auxiliary Air Force, retiring in 1962 from its successor, the Women's Royal Air Force as a warrant officer, (Note: Her service number was 2109222.) and having earned the Royal Air Force Long Service and Good Conduct Medal. In the meantime, she had set up a home at Forres. She subsequently worked as a civil servant in the Department of Health and Social Security in Elgin, from which she retired in 1987.

She recalled in 1988 how she used her George Medal to play the washboard when she was in a skiffle group.

Late in her life, Bick lived in Inverness. She died there on 22 April 2002, age 76.

== Legacy ==
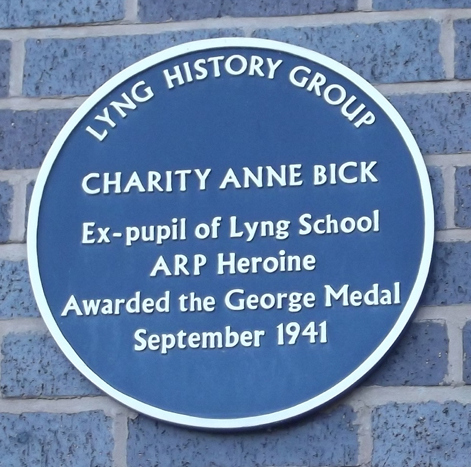
The blue plaque at Lyng School

Bick's portrait, in oil, by Alfred Reginald Thomson, RA, an official war artist, is in the Imperial War Museum, London, while her medals are on display at the Imperial War Museum North. A blue plaque commemorating Bick was erected at Lyng Primary School, by the Lyng History Group, on 21 February 2002. The school was presented with a replica set of her medals in March 2002. Charity Bick Way in West Bromwich (Note: Charity Bick Way: 52.513913°N 1.998133°W) is named in her honour.
