= St Paul Covent Garden =

Former parish in the Liberty of the City of Westminster

Coordinates: 51°30′42″N 0°7′25″W

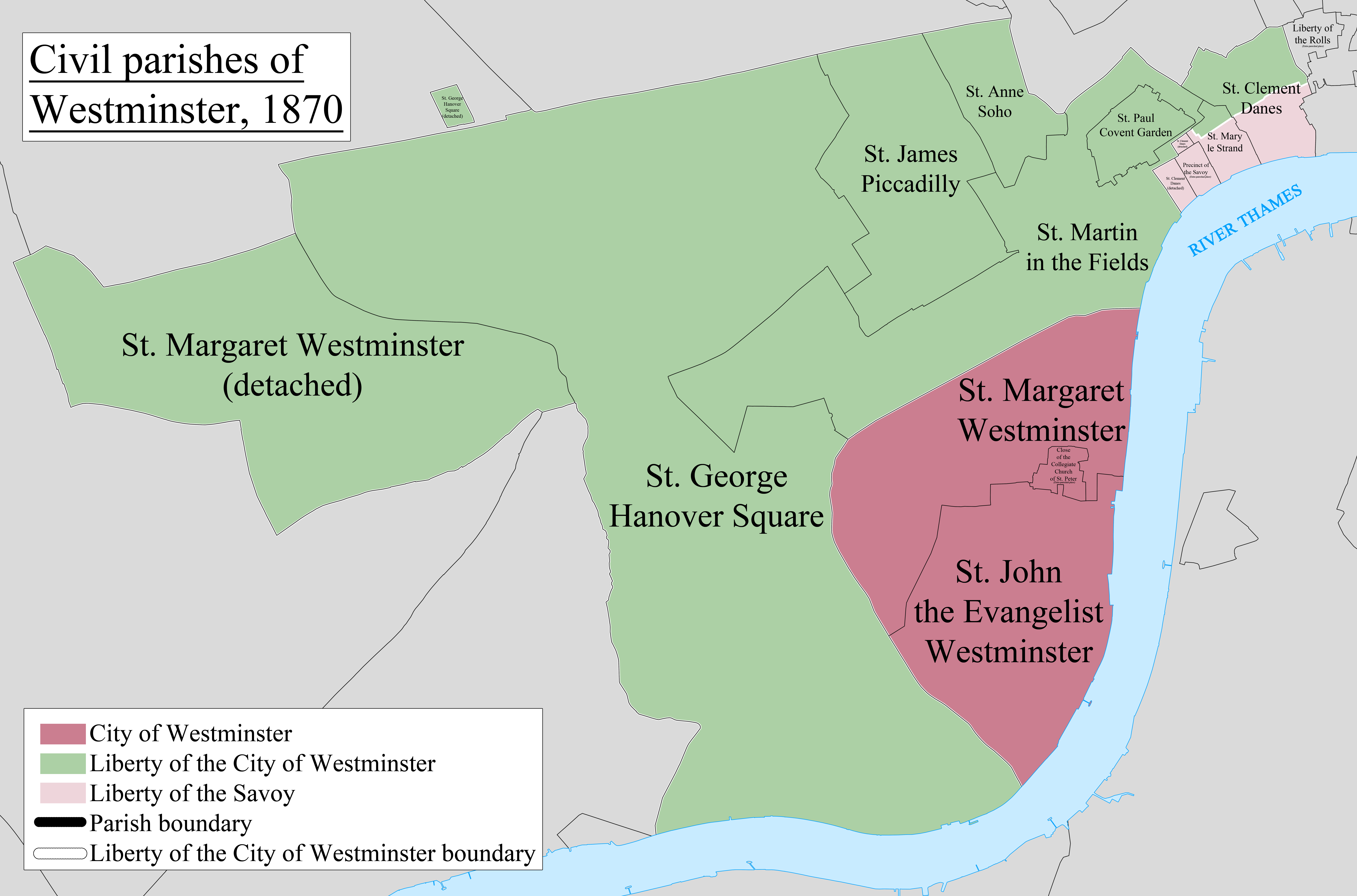
- Area
  - 1881–1921: 26 acres (0.11 km^{2})
- Population
  - 1881: 2,919
  - 1901: 1,692
  - 1921: 1,063
- History
  - Created: 1645
  - Abolished: 1922
  - Succeeded by: City of Westminster
- Status: Civil parish
- Government: St Paul Vestry (1645–1855); Strand District Board of Works (1855–1900)
- Contained within
  - District: Strand (1855–1900)
  - Poor Law Union: Strand (1836–1913); City of Westminster (1913–1922)

St Paul Covent Garden was a civil parish in the metropolitan area of London, England. The former area of the parish now corresponds to the Covent Garden market and surrounding streets in the City of Westminster. At the 1921 census (the last before the abolition of the parish), St Paul Covent Garden had a population of 1063.

== History ==
It was created in 1645 from part of the ancient parish of St Martin in the Fields, and was within the Liberty of Westminster. The parish was included in the returns of the bills of mortality.

St Paul Covent Garden was completely surrounded by the parish of St Martin in the Fields. It was grouped into the Strand District in 1855 when it came within the area of responsibility of the Metropolitan Board of Works.

In 1889 the parish became part of the County of London and in 1900 it became part of the Metropolitan Borough of Westminster. On 1 April 1922 the parish was abolished to form City of Westminster.

== Poor law ==
The parish workhouse in Cleveland Street, Marylebone became the workhouse of the Strand Poor Law Union in 1836.
