= New Cross Hospital, Deptford =

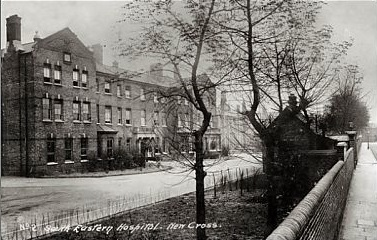
- New Cross Hospital, Deptford

- Shown in Lewisham

Geography
- Location: New Cross, London, England
- Coordinates: 51.4791°N 0.0517°W

Organisation
- Care system: NHS
- Type: General

Services
- Emergency department: No

History
- Founded: 1877
- Closed: 1991

Links
- Lists: Hospitals in England

New Cross Hospital was a hospital in the New Cross district of south east London, open from 1877 until around 1991.

== History ==
The hospital was opened by the Metropolitan Asylums Board (MAB) on 17 March 1877 as Deptford Hospital. Its purpose at that time was as a fever hospital treating patients suffering from smallpox, of which there was an epidemic at the time. It was one five fever hospitals – the others were in Fulham, Hampstead (site now occupied by the Royal Free Hospital), Homerton (site of Homerton University Hospital) and Stockwell (now Lambeth Hospital) – forming a ring around central London, and shared the same architects as the Fulham hospital (J Walker and W Crickman).

In 1885, its name was changed to the South Eastern Fever Hospital. The hospital was expanded between 1902 and 1906. In 1908, the facilities included 488 beds and its site covered an area of 10 acres (4.0 ha). It was transferred from the MAB to control by London County Council in 1930. At the time of transfer to the London County Council the hospital had 480 beds, Medical Superintendent was FM Turner MD SCDP DPH and the matron was Miss FM Campbell. Campbell was a member of the executive committee of the National Council of Nurses for Great Britain. In July 1943 she was invited to join the National Advisory Council for the Recruitment and Distribution of Nurses and Midwives with the remit to recruit nurses to sanatoria.

The hospital continued to be a fever hospital until 1941. It was given the name New Cross General Hospital around 1949, soon after the creation of the National Health Service (NHS), and after the NHS closed it for a time it re-opened in 1952 as a satellite for Guy's Hospital. By 1982, it comprised 269 beds and was mainly used by geriatric patients. It closed as a hospital around 1991, (Note: At least one source says it closed in 1987.) but southern parts of the site to the north of Wardalls Grove remained in NHS use until at least 2004.

== Notable people ==
Notable people connected with the hospital included:

- James Niven, physician at the hospital
