= Helen Cargill =

British nurse and Royal Air force officer

Dame Helen Cargill
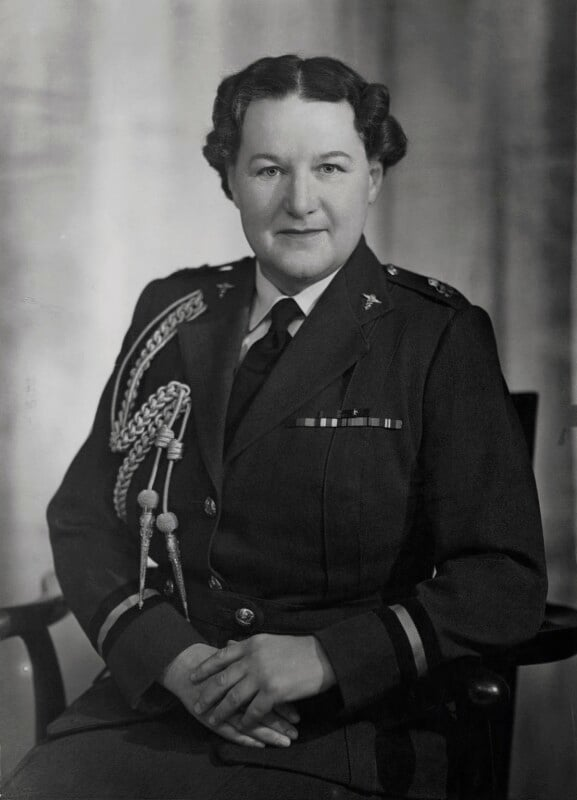
- Cargill in 1950
- Born: 1 October 1896
- Died: 4 December 1969 (aged 73)
- Burial place: Morningside Cemetery
- Military career
- Allegiance: United Kingdom
- Branch: Royal Air Force
- Service years: 1923–1952
- Rank: Air Commandant
- Commands: Princess Mary's Royal Air Force Nursing Service (1948–52)
- Conflicts: Second World War
- Awards: Dame Commander of the Order of the British Empire; Royal Red Cross; Commander of the Order of St John

Air Commandant Dame Helen Wilson Cargill, DBE, RRC, CStJ (1 October 1896 – 4 December 1969) was a British nurse and Royal Air force officer. From 1948 to 1952, she was Matron-in-Chief of Princess Mary's Royal Air Force Nursing Service.

== Early life and education ==
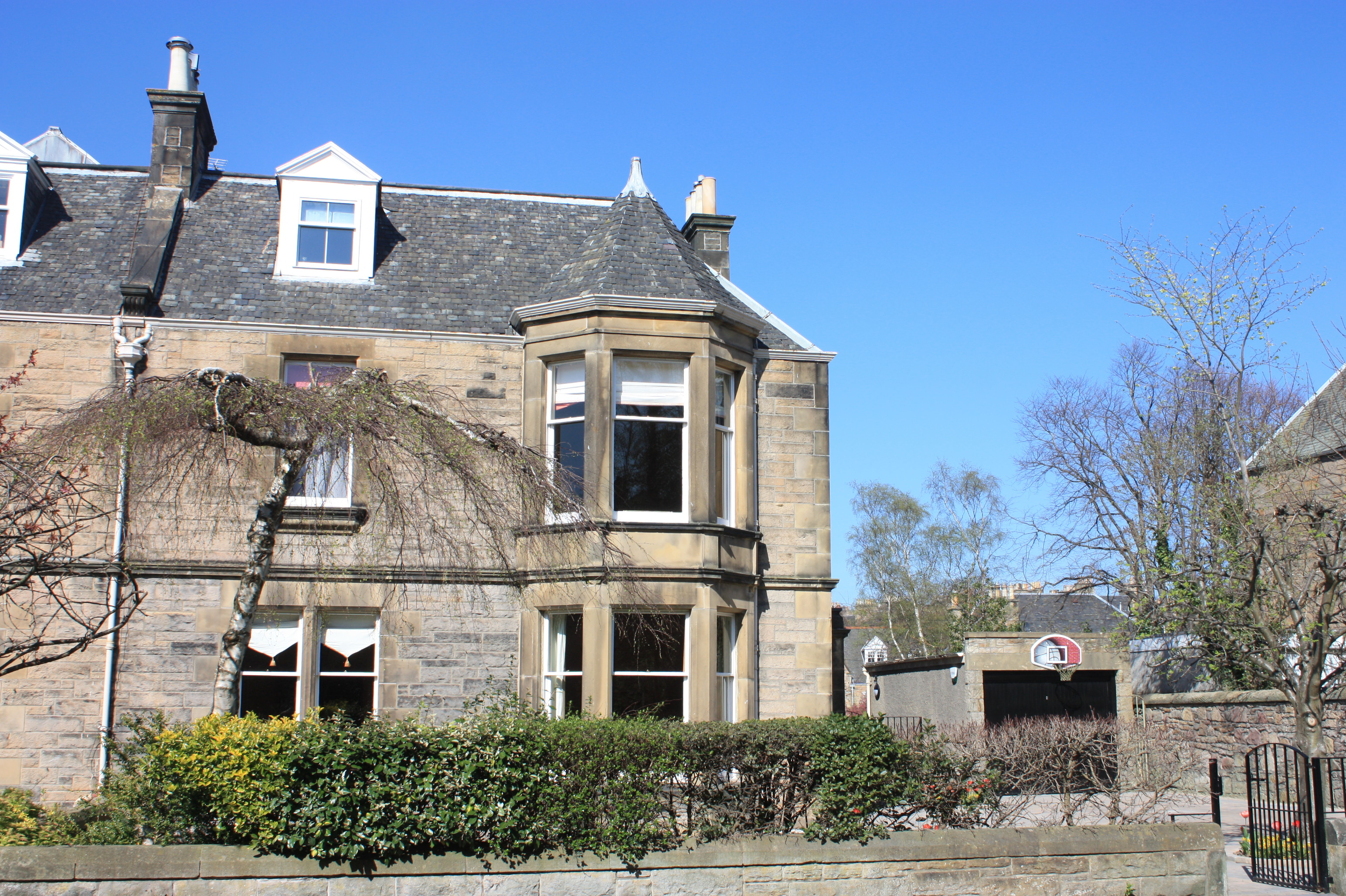
11 Cluny Avenue, Edinburgh

Cargill was born on 1 October 1896, the daughter of William Cargill and his wife, Jane Elizabeth Murphy. They lived at 11 Cluny Avenue in Morningside, Edinburgh. She was educated at St Bride's School, Edinburgh. From 1919 to 1923, she trained as a nurse at St George's Hospital, a teaching hospital in London.

== Military career ==
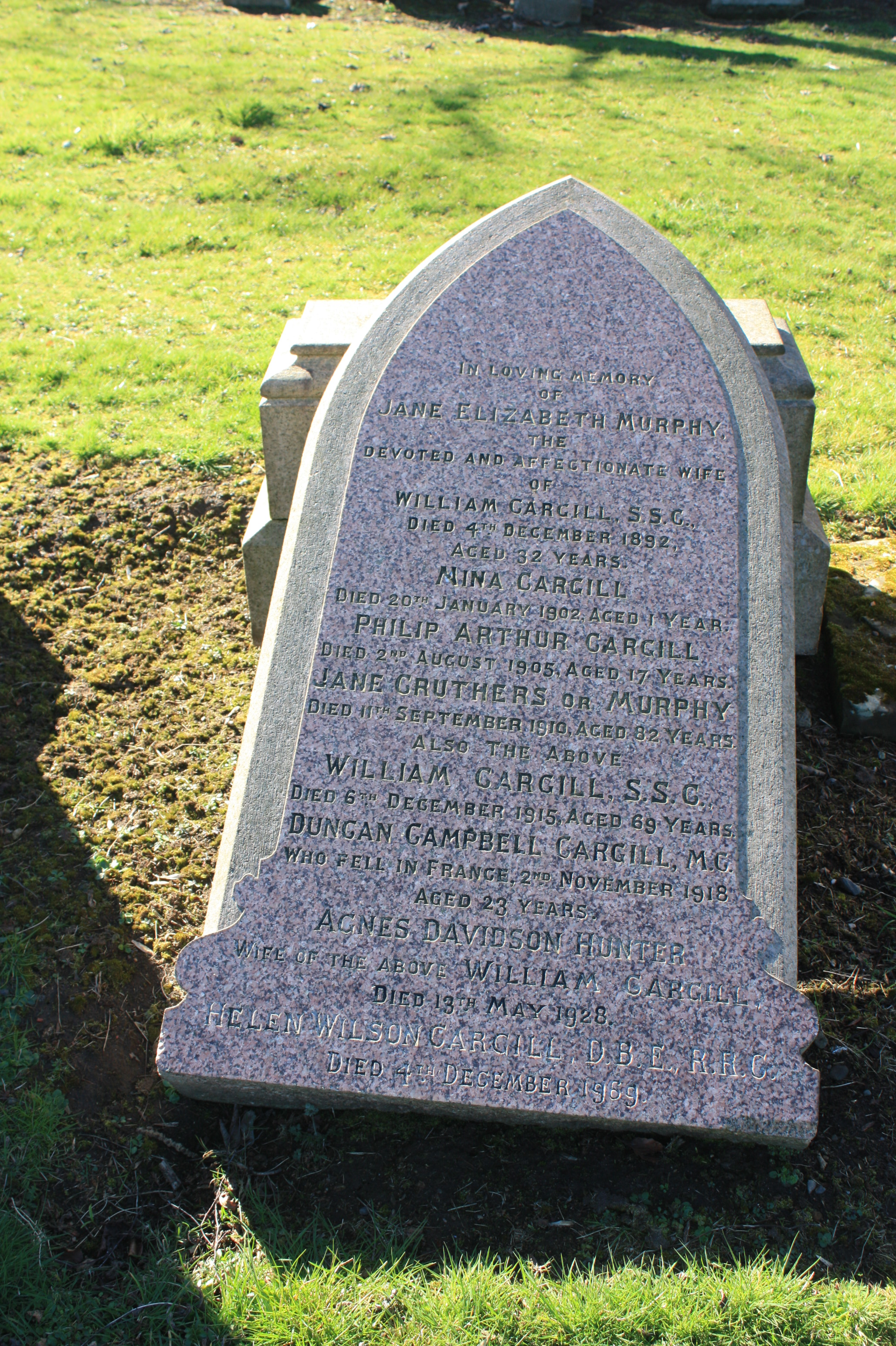
The grave of Dame Helen Cargill, Morningside Cemetery, Edinburgh

In June 1923, Cargill joined the newly re-named Princess Mary's Royal Air Force Nursing Service. She was promoted to sister on 1 July 1926, and to senior sister on 1 February 1939. During the interwar period, she served in the United Kingdom and in the Middle East.

Cargill saw active service during the Second World War. She was an acting matron as of June 1941. In the 1941 King's Birthday Honours, Cargill was appointed an Associate of the Royal Red Cross. From 1942 to 1944, she served in the United Kingdom and in Aden. Following the Normandy Landings, she was matron of the RAF Hospital in Normandy, France. From September 1944 to May 1945, the end of the war in Europe, she was matron of a hospital in Brussels, Belgium. In the 1945 King's Birthday Honours, she was promoted to Member of the Royal Red Cross.

Cargill returned to the United Kingdom after the end of the war and spent the rest of her military career as matron of the RAF Hospital in Matlock, Derbyshire. This was a psychiatric hospital that specialised in the treatment of former prisoners of war. On 16 July 1948, she was appointed the Matron-in-Chief of Princess Mary's Royal Air Force Nursing Service. On 1 February 1949, when the women's forces were integrated into the British Armed Forces, she was granted the rank of air commandant. She was appointed a Commander of the Order of St John (CStJ) in June 1949, and a Dame Commander of the Order of the British Empire in the 1951 New Year Honours.

Cargill retired from the military due to "medical unfitness for air force service" on 12 May 1952.

== Death ==
Cargill died on 4 December 1969, aged 73. She was buried with her parents in Morningside Cemetery, Edinburgh, close to their family home. The toppled gravestone lies in the south-west section.

Military offices
Preceded by Dame Gladys Taylor	Matron-in-Chief Princess Mary's Royal Air Force Nursing Service; 1948–1952	Succeeded by Dame Roberta Whyte
