= Gladys Taylor (nurse) =

British military nurse and nursing administrator

Dame Gladys Taylor
- Born: 1890
- Died: 11 January 1950 (aged 59–60); Westminster Hospital, London
- Military career
- Allegiance: United Kingdom
- Branch: Royal Air Force
- Rank: Matron-in-Chief
- Commands: Princess Mary's Royal Air Force Nursing Service (1943–48)
- Conflicts: Second World War
- Awards: Dame Commander of the Order of the British Empire; Royal Red Cross

Dame Gladys Taylor, DBE, RRC (1890 – 11 January 1950) was a British military nurse and nursing administrator who served as matron-in-chief of Princess Mary's Royal Air Force Nursing Service (PMRAFNS) from 1943 to 1948.

== Early life ==
Born in 1890, Gladys Taylor was one of three siblings.

== Career ==
Taylor trained at University College Hospital, London. In 1918 she joined the PMRAFNS and was posted to the RAF Health Centre in Matlock. She was promoted to sister, then senior sister and then matron by 1935. She served in RAF hospitals in the United Kingdom, Aden and Iraq. She was awarded the Royal Red Cross in 1939.

Taylor was a founding member of the College of Nursing, later the Royal College of Nursing. She was number 13303 in the College of Nursing Register of Nurses in 1919 and registered with the General Nursing Council in 1922.

Taylor was promoted to the rank of principal matron in 1942, and then matron-in-chief on the retirement of Emily Blair in 1943. She was made a Commander of the Order of the British Empire in the same year.

== Honours ==
- 1939 Royal Red Cross (first class)
- 1943 Commander of the Order of the British Empire
- 1949 Dame Commander of the Order of the British Empire

== Death ==
Taylor died in Westminster Hospital on 11 January 1950, and was cremated at Golders Green Crematorium.

Military offices
Preceded by Dame Emily Blair	Matron-in-Chief Princess Mary's Royal Air Force Nursing Service; 1943–1948	Succeeded by Dame Helen Cargill
