= Emily Blair =

British military nurse and nursing administrator

Dame Emily Blair
- Born: 12 January 1890; Boghead, Lenzie, Scotland
- Died: 25 December 1963 (aged 73); London, England
- Military career
- Allegiance: United Kingdom
- Branch: British Army (1916–1918); Royal Air Force (1918–1943)
- Service years: 1916–1943
- Rank: Matron-in-Chief
- Commands: Princess Mary's Royal Air Force Nursing Service (1938–1943)
- Conflicts: World War I World War II
- Awards: Dame Commander of the Order of the British Empire; Royal Red Cross; Mentioned in dispatches Florence Nightingale Medal
- Other work: Matron-in-Chief British Red Cross Society (1947–1953)

Dame Emily Mathieson Blair, DBE, RRC (12 January 1890 – 25 December 1963) was a British military nurse and nursing administrator who served as Matron-in-Chief of the Princess Mary's Royal Air Force Nursing Service (1938–43), Joint War Committee (1943–47) and the British Red Cross Society (1947–53).

== Early life ==
Emily Mathieson Blair was born on 12 January 1890 at Boghead, Lenzie, Kirkintilloch, the daughter of Mary Ann (née Croll) and Hugh Blair, a businessman and muslin manufacturer. From 1912 to 1916 she trained as a nurse at Western Infirmary, Glasgow.

== Nursing career ==
During the First World War Blair served with the Queen Alexandra's Imperial Military Nursing Service. When the Royal Air Force was formed in 1918 she moved to the Princess Mary's Royal Air Force Nursing Service, becoming Matron-in-Chief in 1938. In the same year she was awarded the Royal Red Cross. During the Second World War she was mentioned in dispatches.

In 1943, Blair was appointed Matron-in-Chief of the Joint War Committee. When the committee was disbanded in 1947, Blair served as Matron-in-Chief of the British Red Cross Society until 1953, and was responsible for supplying trained nurses for service in hospitals and convalescent homes. She was made a Dame Commander of the Order of the British Empire on 2 June 1943, and was awarded the Florence Nightingale Medal by the International Committee of the Red Cross in 1947.

== Later life ==
Blair retired in 1953 and remained a member of the Council of the British Red Cross until her death. She died of lung cancer on 25 December 1963 in a London nursing home.

A portrait of Blair painted in 1943 by the official RAF war artist, Alfred Thomson, and exhibited at the Royal Academy, is held by the Royal Air Force Museum.

Military offices
Preceded by Katherine Watt	Matron-in-Chief Princess Mary's Royal Air Force Nursing Service; 1938–1943	Succeeded by Gladys Taylor
