= Joanna Cruickshank =

Dame Joanna Cruickshank
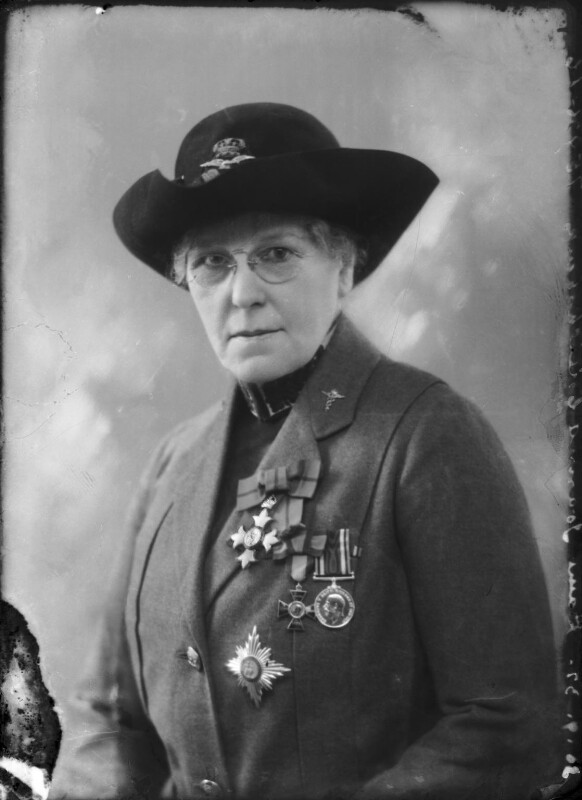
- Cruickshank in 1932
- Born: 28 November 1875; Murree, British India
- Died: 16 August 1958 (aged 82)
- Military career
- Allegiance: United Kingdom
- Branch: British Army; Royal Air Force
- Rank: Matron-in-Chief
- Commands: Princess Mary's Royal Air Force Nursing Service (1918–1930)
- Conflicts: World War I
- Awards: Dame Commander of the Order of the British Empire; Royal Red Cross

Dame Joanna Margaret Cruickshank, DBE, RRC (28 November 1875 – 16 August 1958) was a British military nurse and nursing administrator. She founded Princess Mary's Royal Air Force Nursing Service in November 1918 and served as its first Matron-in-Chief from 1921 until her retirement in November 1930.

== Biography ==
Joanna Margaret Cruickshank was born the second daughter of William and Johanna Cruickshank on 28 November 1875 in Murree, India (now in Pakistan). She trained at Guy's Hospital, London, then travelled back to India in 1912 to serve as sister in the Lady Minto Nursing Association. In 1917 she joined Queen Alexandra's Imperial Military Nursing Service (QAIMNS). After contracting a malignant form of malaria, and suffering a series of fevers, she was invalided home to Britain in March 1918. She was awarded the Royal Red Cross (RRC), 1st Class, in 1919. She was appointed a Commander of the Order of the British Empire (CBE) in the 1927 Birthday Honours, and promoted to Dame Commander of the Order (DBE) in the 1931 Birthday Honours.

In 1940, Cruickshank was named Commandant of the Rushen Women's and Married Internees Camp on the Isle of Man; she was later succeeded by Detective Inspector Cuthbert of New Scotland Yard.

Dame Joanna Cruickshank died at age 82 in 1958.

== Sources ==
- Cuthbert, C. R., Papers of the Commandant of Rushen Women's and Married Internees Camp 1941– 1945 Detective Inspector Cuthbert of New Scotland Yard succeeded Dame Joanna Cruickshank as Commandant. This small deposit contains two volumes of UK and IOM newspaper cuttings relating to internment as well as letters and greeting cards from internees. (Archive Reference# MS 11196)

Military offices
Preceded by New post	Matron-in-Chief Princess Mary's Royal Air Force Nursing Service; 1921–1930	Succeeded by Dame Katherine Watt
