= Princess Mary's Royal Air Force Nursing Service =

Royal Air Force Nursing Service
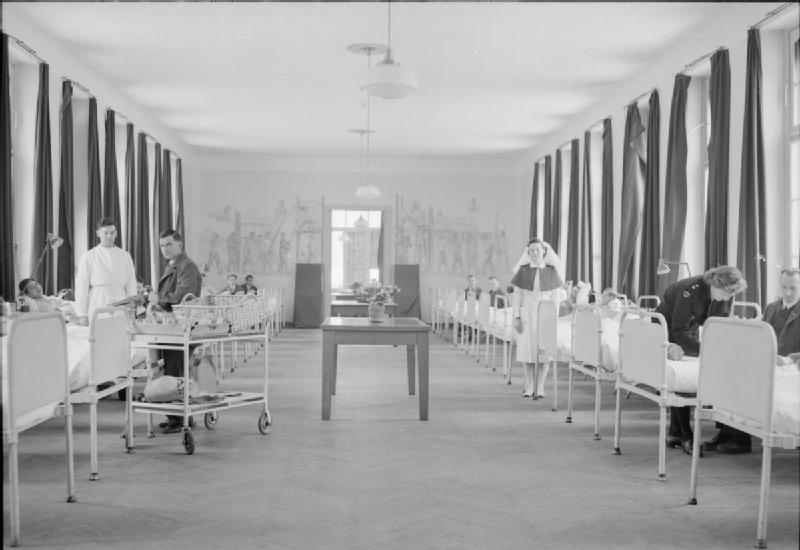
- RAF General Hospital in Brussels during the Second World War
- Active: 1 June 1918–present (originally as Royal Air Force Temporary Nursing Service)
- Country: United Kingdom
- Allegiance: HM The King
- Branch: Royal Air Force; RAF Medical Services
- Type: Nursing
- Role: Medicine
- Size: 498 nurses
- Garrison/HQ: Air Command, RAF High Wycombe
- Engagements: World War II, Korean War, Falklands War, Gulf War (Op GRANBY), Bosnian War, Kosovo War, War in Afghanistan, Gulf War II (Op TELIC)

Commanders
- Matron-In-Chief: Group Captain Charlie Thompson
- Patron: Princess Alexandra, The Honourable Lady Ogilvy

Insignia
- RAF Ensign

- Red Cross Emblem

Princess Mary's Royal Air Force Nursing Service (PMRAFNS) is the nursing branch of the British Royal Air Force.

It was established as the Royal Air Force Temporary Nursing Service (RAFNS) in 1918, and became part of the permanent establishment as the Royal Air Force Nursing Service on 27 January 1921. It received the Royal prefix after Princess Mary agreed to become its Patron in June 1923.

It was a women-only branch until 1980, when men were also permitted to join. Until the Second World War, it was only open to unmarried women, or childless widows. There was also a Princess Mary's Royal Air Force Nursing Service (Reserve) (PMRAFNS(R)) to supplement the regular service during times of war or emergencies.

A history of the service was commissioned from the writer Mary Mackie and appeared in 2001. An updated and extended edition covering subsequent decades (including service in Afghanistan) was published in September 2014.

== Ranks ==
The initial ranking system used by the PMRAFNS was as follows.

PMRAFNS rank	Equivalent RAF rank (from 1943)
Staff Nurse	
Sister	Flying Officer
Senior Sister	Flight Lieutenant
Matron	Squadron Leader
Principal Matron	Wing Commander
Chief Principal Matron	Group Captain
Matron-in-Chief	Air Commodore

From 1 June 1943, PMRAFNS personnel were granted emergency Commissions, and wore rank insignia corresponding to their equivalent Royal Air Force officer rank. On 1 February 1949, the women's forces were integrated into the Armed Forces, and a new ranking system was introduced, although professional titles were still used on the wards.

PMRAFNS rank	Equivalent RAF rank
Flying Officer	Flying Officer
Flight Officer	Flight Lieutenant
Squadron Officer	Squadron Leader
Wing Officer	Wing Commander
Group Officer	Group Captain
Air Commandant	Air Commodore
Air Chief Commandant	Air Vice-Marshal

Other Ranks were introduced in 1956, although unqualified Nursing Orderlies had previously served in the Women's Auxiliary Air Force and Women's Royal Air Force. They held standard RAF ranks. Officers used the separate ranking system until 1980, when they too adopted RAF ranks.

== Hospitals ==
The RAF had several hospitals which were staffed by nurses from the PMRAFNS. These were located at Akrotiri, Albrighton, Wolverhampton, Ely, Halton Nocton Hall, Lincolnshire, Aden, Uxbridge, Wegberg and Wroughton.

== Matrons-in-Chief ==
- Dame Joanna Cruickshank, 1918–1930
- Dame Katherine Watt, 1930–1938
- Dame Emily Blair, 1938–1943
- Dame Gladys Taylor, 1943–1948
- Air Commandant Dame Helen Cargill, 1948–1952
- Air Commandant Dame Roberta Whyte, 1952–1956
- Air Commandant Dame Alice Williamson, 1956–1959
- Air Commandant Dame Alice Lowrey, 1959–1963
- Air Commandant Dame Veronica Ashworth, 1963–1966
- Air Commandant Dame Pauline Giles, 1966–1970
- Air Commandant Ann McDonald, 1970–1972
- Air Commandant Barbara Ducat-Amos, 1972–1978
- Air Commodore Joan Metcalfe, 1978–1981
- Air Commodore Joy Harris, 1981–1984
- Air Commodore April Reed, 1984–1985
- Group Captain Mary Shaw, 1985–1988
- Group Captain Elizabeth Sandison, 1988–1991
- Group Captain Ethnea Hancock, 1991–1994
- Air Commodore Valerie Hand, 1994–1997
- Air Commodore Bob Williams, 1997–2001
- Group Captain Annie Reid, 2001–2004
- Group Captain Wendy Williams, 2004–2006
- Group Captain Jackie Gross, 2006–2010
- Group Captain Phil Cushen, 2010–2013
- Group Captain Phil Spragg, 2013–2015
- Group Captain Michael Priestley, 2015–2018
- Group Captain Fionnuala Bradley, 2018–2021
- Group Captain Emma Redman, 2021–

== Early matrons of the new Royal Air Force Temporary Nursing Service ==
- Laura Margaret Holroyde, RRC and bar, was Matron of a new Royal Flying Corps Hospital, later renamed as the Royal Air Force Hospital, in Eton Square, London from 1917 to 1919. She had trained at The London Hospital under Matron Eva Luckes. From June 1921 Holroyde became matron of the London Fever Hospital until 1946.

== See also ==
- Queen Alexandra's Royal Naval Nursing Service
- Queen Alexandra's Royal Army Nursing Corps
