= Grove Hospital =

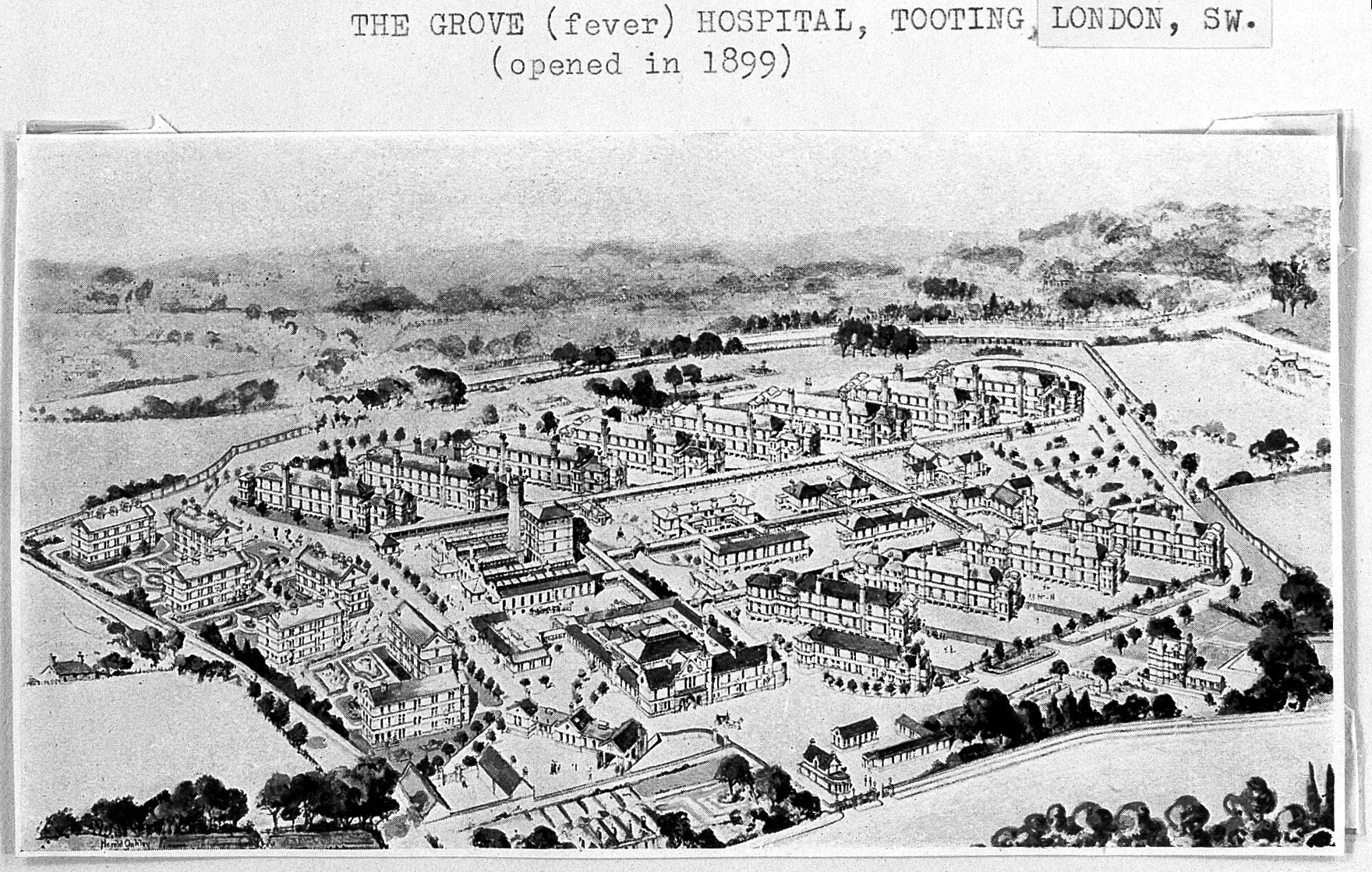
- Grove Hospital

- Location within Wandsworth

Geography
- Location: Tooting Grove, London, England
- Coordinates: 51.4256°N 0.1720°W

History
- Founded: 1899
- Closed: 1958

Links
- Lists: Hospitals in England

The Grove Hospital, originally the Grove Fever Hospital, was a hospital for infectious diseases opened in Tooting Grove, London in 1899.

== History ==
The hospital was commissioned in 1893 by the Metropolitan Asyslum Board (MAB) and opened as the Grove Fever Hospital in Tooting Grove, London in 1899.

The Fountain Fever Hospital was added as an annexe in 1893, but in 1913 it was converted to become a mental hospital for children who were severely 'mentally subnormal'.

The Grove Fever Hospital became the Grove Military Hospital in 1916 before reverting to civilian use as a fever hospital again in 1920. In 1930 the hospital came under the jurisdiction of the London County Council, following the Local Government Act 1929. At this time the hospital had 556 beds and the senior staff were: JH Whitaker MD, BS, DPH (Medical Director), Miss MH Griffith (Matron) and HE Austin MBE (steward).

In 1932, Joseph Bramhall Ellison, while working at the hospital, discovered that vitamin A significantly reduces measles mortality in children.

As the Grove Hospital, it joined the National Health Service in 1948. It became incorporated into St George's Hospital, as the Tooting Branch, in 1958. Although two ward blocks remain, most of the premises were demolished in 1973 to make way for the new St. George's Hospital, which transferred from its previous site in central London at Hyde Park Corner.

== Notable staff ==
- Alice Ann Browne R.R.C. (1866– ) Matron, 1902 – until at least 1925, also Matron of The Grove Military Hospital 1916–1919. Browne trained at The London Hospital under Eva Luckes between 1895 and 1897 and had worked at St Pancras Infirmary as Night Sister and Matron at the Union Infirmary, Newcastle upon Tyne before this appointment. Whilst she was matron of the Fever Hospital, Browne was responsible for 537 patients. As a military hospital it enlarged to 1,000 beds.
- Flora Harris (1870-1930), Assistant Matron and Matron of the Fountain Hospital and Highwood School 1910-1930. Harris trained at The London Hospital under Eva Luckes between 1902-1904.

Badges for nurses who trained at the hospital
