= Katherine Watt =

British nurse, civil servant

Dame Katherine Watt DBE RRC CStJ
- Born: 31 August 1886; Govanhill, Glasgow, Scotland
- Died: 1 November 1963 (aged 77); St George's Hospital, London, England
- Military career
- Allegiance: United Kingdom
- Branch: British Army (c. 1914–19); Royal Air Force (1919–38)
- Service years: c. 1914–1938
- Rank: Matron-in-Chief
- Commands: Princess Mary's Royal Air Force Nursing Service (1930–38)
- Conflicts: First World War
- Other work: Chief Nursing Officer (1941–48)

Dame Katherine Christie Watt, DBE, RRC, CStJ (31 August 1886 – 1 November 1963) was a British military nurse, nursing administrator and civil servant.

Watt completed her general nurse training at the Western Infirmary Glasgow. She completed her midwifery training at the Middlesex Hospital, London.

Watt served in the Queen Alexandra's Imperial Military Nursing Service during the First World War, and the Princess Mary's Royal Air Force Nursing Service in the inter-war period. She was Matron-in-Chief of the Royal Air Force Nursing Service from 1930 to 1938, and worked at the Ministry of Health during and immediately after the Second World War.

As Chief Nursing Officer from 1941 to 1948, she was actively involved in the plans for the new National Health Service (NHS). Watt was the first Chief Nursing Officer appointed to the Ministry of Health in England. She started work at the Ministry as Principal Matron for the Emergency Medical Services in 1939. She then became Chief Nursing Advisor in 1948. She retired in 1950.

In this role she visited a number of countries by invitation to attend nursing conferences as well as exchange ideas with colleagues. This included Syria, The Lebanon, Iran. Iraq, India, Pakistan, Ceylon (Sri Lanka), Egypt, Australia and New Zealand.

== Honours ==
On 3 June 1930, Watt was awarded the Royal Red Cross (RRC) "in recognition of exceptional devotion and competency displayed in Royal Air Force hospitals at home and in Iraq". In the 1935 King's Birthday Honours, she was appointed a Commander of the Order of the British Empire (CBE).

In the 1945 King's Birthday Honours, she was promoted to Dame Commander of the Order of the British Empire (DBE) in recognition of her service as Chief Nursing Officer, and thereby granted the title dame. In July 1959, she was appointed a Commander of the Order of St John (CStJ).

In 1949 Watt was awarded the Florence Nightingale Medal of the International Red Cross.

Military offices
Preceded by Dame Joanna Cruickshank	Matron-in-Chief Princess Mary's Royal Air Force Nursing Service; 1930–1938	Succeeded by Dame Emily Blair
