= Metropolitan Poor Act 1867 =

Act of the Parliament of the United Kingdom

Metropolitan Poor Act 1867 (Note: Section 1.)
- Act of Parliament
- Parliament of the United Kingdom
- Long title: An Act for the establishment in the Metropolis of Asylums for the Sick, Insane, and Other Classes of the Poor, and of Dispensaries; and for the Distribution over the Metropolis of Portions of the Charge for Poor Relief; and for other Purposes relating to Poor Relief in the Metropolis.
- Citation: 30 & 31 Vict. c. 6
- Introduced by: Gathorne Gathorne-Hardy (Lords)
- Territorial extent: England and Wales (Note: Section 3.)

Dates
- Royal assent: 29 March 1867
- Commencement: 29 March 1867 (Note: The Acts of Parliament (Commencement) Act 1793.)
- Repealed: 1 April 1930
Other legislation
Amends	Poor Law Amendment Act 1834
Amended by	Statute Law Revision Act 1875; Lunacy Act 1890; Local Government Act 1894
Repealed by	Local Government Act 1929

Status: Repealed

Text of statute as originally enacted

The Metropolitan Poor Act 1867 (30 & 31 Vict. c. 6) was an act of the Parliament of the United Kingdom, the first in a series of major reforms that led to the gradual separation of the Poor Law's medical functions from its poor relief functions. It also led to the creation of a separate administrative authority the Metropolitan Asylums Board.

The legislation provided that a single Metropolitan Poor Rate would be levied across the Metropolis: this being defined as the area of the Metropolitan Board of Works. The Poor Law Board (a central government body) was empowered to form the areas of the various parish and poor law unions into districts for the provision of "Asylums for the Sick, Insane, and other Classes of the Poor".

An order was signed on 16 May 1867, combining all the parishes and unions in the Metropolis into a single Metropolitan Asylum District "for the reception and relief of the classes of poor persons chargeable to some union or parish in the said district respectively who may be infected with or suffering from fever, or the disease of small-pox or may be insane." The Metropolitan Asylums Board was established with 60 members: 45 elected by the various poor law boards of guardians and 15 nominated by the Poor Law Board.

The legislation amended the Poor Law Amendment Act 1834 (4 & 5 Will. 4. c. 76) to allow control over parishes that had been excluded from it by local acts. The ten parishes were St James Clerkenwell, St George Hanover Square, St Giles and St George Bloomsbury, St Mary Islington, St James Westminster, St Luke, St Margaret and St John Westminster, St Marylebone, St Mary Newington and St Pancras.

It permitted the employment of probationary nurses who were trained for a year in the sick asylums. These nurses gradually began to replace the employment of untrained paupers.

== Subsequent developments ==
The whole act, except sections 7, 8, 10, 11, 23 and 28 to 30, was repealed by section 245(1) of, and the eleventh schedule to, Poor Law Act 1927 (17 & 18 Geo. 5. c. 14), which came into force on 1 October 1927.
