= List of Royal Air Force hospitals =

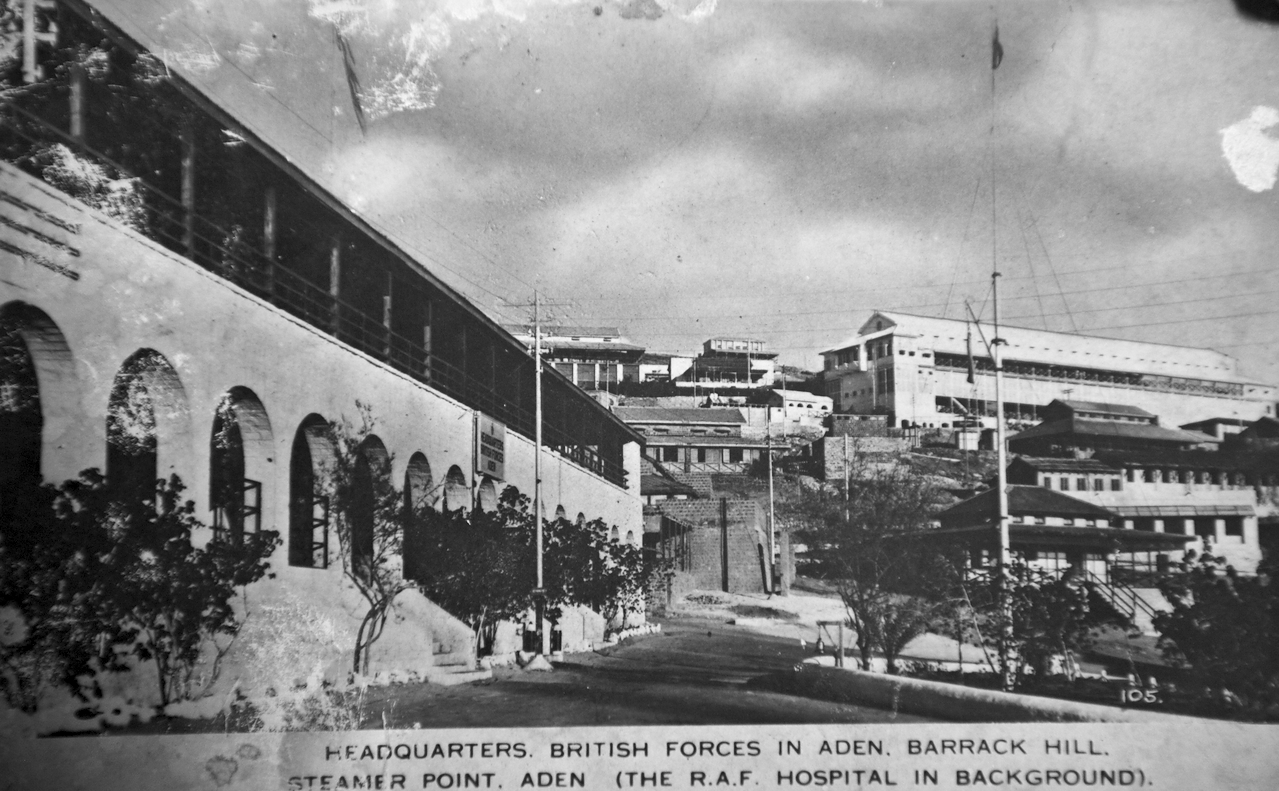
British Forces in Aden: RAF Steamer Point. The RAF hospital is in the background, within RAF Khormaksar.

Royal Air Force hospitals were British military hospitals formerly operated by the Royal Air Force (RAF) of the United Kingdom. They contained dedicated medical care facilities, at strategic locations wherever the RAF was operating, at home and abroad, to cater for in-depth military medical needs of Royal Air Force personnel. The hospitals were staffed by commissioned officer medical professionals of the Royal Air Force Medical Branch, and would serve as a higher tier of medical expertise and treatment above the normal station sick quarters, or later, station medical centre (SMC). The Royal Air Force had many military hospitals within the United Kingdom, along with several RAF hospitals abroad. They were primarily identified by the long-hand official designation Royal Air Force Hospital Nnnnn (where 'Nnnnn' is the geographic location name). This would typically be shortened to RAF Hospital Nnnnn (typically on road signs, in an identical manner to all Royal Air Force stations, aerodromes, and other RAF sites), and would be abbreviated RAF(H) Nnnnn.

The Second World War (WW2) prompted an expansion of RAF hospital facilities and locations: at home in the UK, in Western Europe, and further afield in the Middle East and East Asia. However, at the end of WW2, and the withdrawal by the RAF from the Middle- and Far East, this accelerated many RAF hospital closures. In the early 1990s, the 'thawing' of the Cold War resulted the near-total drawdown of Royal Air Force in West Germany (latterly known collectively as Royal Air Force Germany or RAFG) and the closure (by the RAF) of all RAF airbases. The British Army faced similar reductions in West German locations (known as the British Army of the Rhine or BAOR).

== History ==
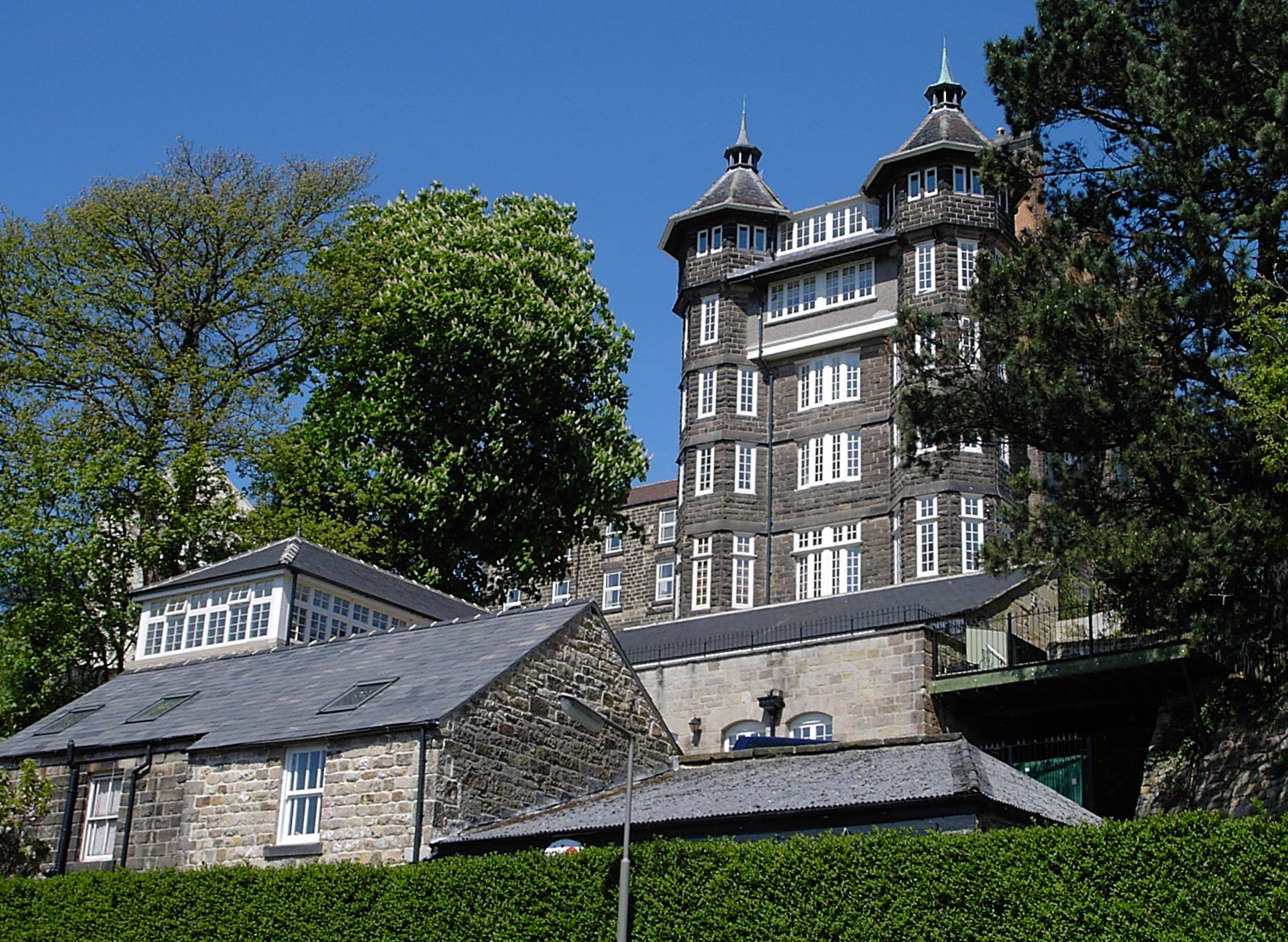
Matlock - Rockside Hall, used as a neuro-psychiatric hospital.

The first hospital for aviation personnel in the British military was at Hampstead in London. This facility opened in 1917, and was open to those from the Royal Flying Corps (RFC) and the Royal Naval Air Service (RNAS). Staffing at Royal Air Force hospitals was based on the number of beds, and the work that was undertaken at that facility. Some of the larger bases could have a roll of between 4,000 and 10,000 people to cater for. Halton, Cranwell, Matlock, Ely, and Torquay were considered separate entities from any RAF stations or bases. Halton and Cranwell had twenty and twelve medical officers (MO) respectively, whereas the large training bases at Cosford and St Athan only had eight each. The original Royal Air Force Officers Hospital was opened at Finchley in 1919, moved to Uxbridge in 1925, and then to Torquay in 1940. A third move was precipitated in October 1942, when the hospital at Torquay was bombed, incurring nineteen fatalities. Most of the hospitals were built in the 1930s or 1940s, to cater either for the RAF Expansion Period, or due to the outbreak of the Second World War.

The hospitals were spread out across Great Britain, and at strategic points throughout the world. One oddity was Lancashire, which had five RAF hospitals within its borders (RAF Hospital Cleveleys, RAF Hospital Kirkham, RAF Hospital Morecambe, RAF Hospital Padgate, and RAF Hospital Weeton), which were deemed to be far enough away from enemy action in the Second World War to be relatively safe from bombing. By the second half of the 1980s, significant reductions and closures had occurred; the RAF had five military hospitals (three in the United Kingdom, and two abroad; namely Ely, Halton, and Wroughton in the UK, with Akrotiri and Wegberg abroad). The average that each hospital had in terms of complement of staff was broken down as 22% officers, 54% other ranks, and 24% civilian employees.

By 1996, all RAF hospitals in the UK and abroad had closed, apart from the hospital at RAF Akrotiri, but by that time, the hospital had been changed into a joint or tri-service asset, rather than strictly just for the Royal Air Force. All three forces in the United Kingdom concentrated their medical services within their bases, and in Ministry of Defence Hospital Units (MDHU), which meant that military medical staff were embedded within NHS public hospitals.

== Royal Air Force hospital locations ==
=== United Kingdom ===
Royal Air Force hospitals in the United Kingdom
location	coordinates	dates	beds (Note: Peak capacity if known)	details	ref
Bridgnorth, England	52.534°N 2.380°W	1939 – 1946(?)	140 (1940)	Situated at RAF Bridgnorth, and looked after basic recruits and the local population.	
Church Village, Wales	51.572°N 3.316°W	September 1942 – April 1946	290 (1943)	The hospital was located 4 miles (6.4 km) south of Pontypridd to avoid the areas being bombed in South Wales.	
Cleveleys, England	53.874°N 3.047°W	March 1943 – October 1945	200 (1942)	Known as the RAF Officers' Hospital, it took on the role of the officers' convalescent hospital after RAF Hospital Torquay was bombed in October 1942.	
Cosford, England	52.651°N 2.289°W	1939 – December 1977	500 (1940)	(Motto: Via ad salutem – Latin: The road to health)	
Cranwell, England	53.0354°N 0.497°W	April 1918 – June 1940	355 (1939)	Replaced as a hospital by RAF Hospital Rauceby. Cranwell was reduced to a station sick quarters.	
Ely, England	52.413°N 0.275°E	1939 – 1992	185 (1985)	The Princess of Wales Hospital (Note: Was known as RAF Hospital Ely between 1939 and 1987. It was renamed in 1987.)	
Evesham, England	52.085°N 1.947°W	August 1941 – March 1946	378 (1940)	As the hospital was not on a main RAF camp, it was used to treat cases of VD in the RAF. When treatment was complete, service personnel (both RAF and WAAF) could then be posted to a 'fresh' unit, rather than back to the one they arrived from. However, the stigma of the hospital treating such cases caused some local concern in the short-term. To combat this, non-VD patients were wheeled around the hospital environs and in the town to promote the notion that the hospital was actually there to treat injured service personnel.	
Finchley, England	51.596°N 0.195°W	May 1919 – June 1925		Initially called the RAF Central Hospital, it was formed at Hampstead in 1917, it soon moved to Finchley. It was one of the three post-war RAF Hospitals along with Halton and Cranwell, but was the smallest and first to close. In June 1925, the hospital was moved to RAF Uxbridge, becoming the officer's Hospital.	
Halton, England	51.769°N 0.727°W	31 October 1927 – 31 March 1996	180 (1972)	The first purpose built RAF Hospital in the Air Force's history. On opening, it had 204 beds and the hospital building formed three sides of a quadrangle, the fourth side being the nurses accommodation. (Motto: Vigilance)	
Haverfordwest, Wales	51.831°N 4.963°W	February 1945 – April 1946		Short-lived hospital. The RAF personnel in the area numbered between 5,000 and 6,000 (across RAF Haverfordwest, RAF Pembroke Dock and RAF St Davids), and medical services were undertaken at Haverfordwest under the aegis of Coastal Command (most other RAF hospitals being under Technical Training Command). Was raised to hospital status in 1945.	
Henlow, England	52.015°N 0.303°W	1939 – 1948	200 (1939)		
Hereford, England	52.085°N 2.795°W	June 1940 – November 1947	192 (1942)	Cared for the service personnel at Hereford, Ludlow, Madley, Newland and Shobdon.	
Innsworth, England	51.893°N 2.197°W	June 1940 – September 1948	117 (1940)		
Kirkham, England	53.775°N 2.873°W	June 1940 – June 1948	270 (1940)		
Lochnaw, Scotland	54.923°N 5.126°W	June 1942 – October 1945		Originally opened to cater for the remoter stations in south-west Scotland which were less able to reach civilian hospitals. The RAF Hospital was moved in the first year into Nissen huts built in the castle grounds. These had been provided for, and built by American forces which were then diverted elsewhere. However, the particular design of hut was at serious risk of fire, of which several did occur before the hospital could accept patients.	
Locking, England	51.338°N 2.904°W	1939 – 1949		Based at RAF Locking, at its peak, the hospital on the training base had to provide medical needs to 7,000 personnel. In 1944, it treated many of the casualties arising from Operation Overlord (D-Day). After 1949, the hospital was downgraded to a normal station sick quarters (SSQ).	
Matlock, England	53.144°N 1.549°W	October 1939 – May 1945		Based in Rockside Hydro in Matlock, the facility was used between October 1918 and April 1919 for personnel returning from the First World War. During the Second World War, it was used as a neurological hospital.	
Melksham, England	51.352°N 2.127°W	July 1940 – 1946	218 (1943)		
Morecambe, England	54.072°N 2.875°W	February 1940 – April 1944		RAF station hospital. Several hotels and large buildings were requisitioned in the Second World War for basic training, driver training, and engine and airframe fitters.	
Nocton Hall, England	53.165°N 0.413°W	1940 – 1983	740 (?)	Was used by the USAF post 1983, including during the First Gulf War, when it provided an overspill capability for wounded personnel. During the period under American control, the beds numbered 1,500. (Motto: Sicut qui ministrant – Latin: (We are) as they who serve)	
Northallerton, England	54.343°N 1.430°W	1940 – 1947	450 (1944)	Operated by the RAF, but catered mostly for patients from the Royal Canadian Air Force (No. 6 Group RAF), whose bases were nearby.	
Padgate, England	53.409°N 2.559°W	May 1939 – 1957	110 (1941)	Originally opened at the recruit centre of RAF Padgate to deal with recruits, it later dealt with suspected smallpox cases among troops disembarking ships at Liverpool docks.	
Rauceby, England	52.983°N 0.450°W	June 1940 – January 1945	250 (1940)	Took over from RAF Cranwell Hospital in 1940.	
St Athan, Wales	51.408°N 3.447°W	1940 – 1961		The hospital was too close to the docks at Cardiff and was bombed several times, with one instance in 1940 requiring patients to be moved to civilian hospitals until repairs could be made	
Torquay, England	50.472°N 3.505°W	October 1939 – October 1942	243 (1940)	Used as a convalescent hospital. Was bombed in October 1942 with 19 deaths and multiple injuries.	
Uxbridge, England	51.545°N 0.471°W	June 1925 – 1972		This hospital opened in 1925 when the hospital at Finchley was closed down. After the officers hospital was moved in 1940, it became a WAAF hospital, then a station hospital until closure. (Motto: Count nothing human indifferent)	
Weeton, England	53.820°N 2.935°W	May 1940 – December 1959	198 (1940)	The hospital survived past the end of the Second World War, with a commanding officer being appointed for the last time in June 1959.	
West Kirby, England	53.372°N 3.182°W	1940 – 1957			
Wilmslow, England	53.336°N 2.203°W	July 1940 – December 1958			
Wroughton, England	51.512°N 1.767°W	1941 – 1996	280 (1985)	In 1982, all aeromedical evacuations from the Falklands Conflict were assessed at Wroughton, being the nearest military hospital to RAF Lyneham (the disembarkation point). (Motto: Salubritas per industriam – Latin: Health through work)	
Yatesbury, England	51.436°N 1.923°W	February 1949 – December 1947	232 (1940)		

=== Overseas ===
Royal Air Force hospitals outside of the United Kingdom
location (Note: Modern day location; some non-UK locations may have been in different sovereign states)	name (Note: Some hospitals did not have names)	coordinates	dates	beds (Note: Peak capacity)	details	motto	ref
Cairo, Egypt	RAF No. 5 Hospital Middle East	30.0629°N 31.274°E	March 1943 – March 1947		Formed at Cairo in March 1942, and moved to Abassia in January 1943.	Alatos Recreamus – Latin: We restore to health the wing borne men	
Aden, Yemen	RAF Khormaksar Hospital Beach	12.831°N 45.029°E	1959 – 1967	163 (1959)	Smaller hospital in the Aden Protectorate adjacent to RAF Khormaksar.	Health is a crown on the heads of the fit that is seen by none but the sick (Note: Original motto was in Arabic.)	
Aden, Yemen	RAF Steamer Point	12.785°N 44.981°E	1928 – 1967	180 (1955)	Hospital was taken over by the RAF in 1928, and was used by all service personnel in the Aden Protectorate and their families. Merchant seaman also used the facilities.	Cuilibet adjumenta salutus	
Akrotiri, Cyprus	The Princess Mary's Hospital	34.5696°N 32.9373°E	1963 – 1996	170 (1972)	Opened in 1963, the unit was turned into a military hospital in 1996, after all the RAF Hospitals closed. It continued as Joint military hospital until 2013.	Strive to heal	
Brussels, Belgium	RAF No. 8 General Hospital	50.833°N 4.349°E	September 1944 – 1945		Was originally created at Ashton Down in England, and then moved to Bayeaux, Normandy after D-Day, before becoming permanent at Brussels.		
Changi, Singapore		1.376°N 103.983°E	1947 – 1973		RAF Hospital which opened post-war near to RAF Changi airfield.	Wings of mercy	
Habbaniya, Iraq	No. 6 RAF Hospital	33.382°N 43.573°E	December 1937 – 1956	500 (1937)	Was deemed to be an RAF General Hospital (RAFGH), but was downgraded to a station hospital in 1956.		
Hinaidi, Iraq		33.287°N 44.475°E	? – 1936		A report from 1930/1931, stated that temperatures in the shade at Hinaidi were 49 °C (120 °F), which proved problematic in keeping patients cool. Hospital was moved to RAF Habbaniya in December 1937.		
Lagens, Azores		38.763°N 27.089°W	September 1943 – October 1946	150 (1943)			
Maison Carrée, Algeria	No. 2 RAF General Hospital	36.721°N 3.137°E	September 1943 – August 1946	200			
Reykjavik, Iceland	RAF No. 11 General Hospital	64.122°N 21.928°W	March 1942 – 1946	200 (1942)	Taken over from the Army in 1942; was administered by Coastal Command.		
Rostrup, Germany		53.210°N 7.987°E	1952 – 1953		The hospital was a temporary one, being replaced by RAFH Webgerg. The design of Rostrup was considered poor by the Air Commodore of the Construction Branch of the RAF, and he redesigned the plans, which were put into effect for Wegberg.		
Takoradi, Gold Coast (Note: The Gold Coast is now known as Ghana.)		4.895°N 1.774°W	January 1942 – November 1947	170			
Wegberg, Germany,		51°09′26.21″N 6°18′19.81″E	November 1953 – April 1996	220 (1972)	The hospital was built to replace one at Rostrup. Wegberg was known as the 100-day hospital due to the amount of time it took to construct (which was actually 111 days).	Inter era sales – Latin: In [the] midst of ferocity, healing	

== See also ==
- RAF Institute of Aviation Medicine
- RAF Centre of Aviation Medicine
