= RAF Hospital =

Royal Air Force hospitals

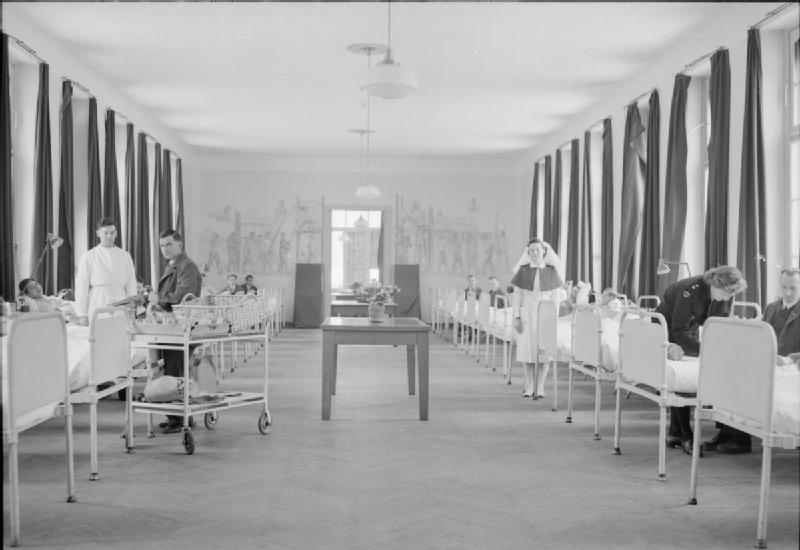
One of the wards at No. 8 RAF General Hospital in Brussels, photographed between 1939 and 1945

There have been several British military hospitals formerly operated by the Royal Air Force (RAF) of the United Kingdom. They were primarily identified by the designation Royal Air Force Hospital Nnnnn (where 'Nnnnn' is the geographic location name). This would typically be shortened to RAF Hospital Nnnnn (typically on road signs, in an identical manner to all Royal Air Force stations, aerodromes, and other RAF sites), and would be abbreviated RAF(H) Nnnnn.

list of Royal Air Force Hospitals - RAF(H)
| full name | county or location | opened | closed | notes |
|---|---|---|---|---|
| Royal Air Force Hospital Cosford | Shropshire | 1940 | 1977 | |
| Royal Air Force Hospital Ely | Cambridgeshire | 1940 | 1992 | |
| Royal Air Force Hospital Middle East | Cairo, Egypt | March 1943 | March 1947 | |
| Royal Air Force Hospital Nocton Hall | Lincolnshire | | | |
| Royal Air Force Hospital Northallerton | North Yorkshire | 1943 | 1947 | |
| Royal Air Force Hospital Torquay | Devon | 1939 | 1942 | |
| Royal Air Force Hospital Uxbridge | then in Middlesex | | | within the Royal Air Force Station Uxbridge |
| Royal Air Force Hospital Wegberg | near Mönchengladbach, Germany | 1953 | | |
| Royal Air Force Princess Alexandra Hospital | near Wroughton, Wiltshire | | | also known as Royal Air Force Hospital Wroughton |
| The Princess Mary's Hospital | Akrotiri, Akrotiri and Dhekelia, Cyprus | | | within the Royal Air Force Station Akrotiri |
| Princess Mary's Royal Air Force Hospital Halton | Halton, Buckinghamshire | | | adjacent to but separate from Royal Air Force Station Halton |

Note: the county or location is listed as per its period of operation; counties, and their boundaries may have been subsequently renamed, merged, or abolished.

== See also ==
- List of former Royal Air Force stations
