= RAF Hospital Ely =

Former Royal Air Force hospital in Cambridgeshire, England

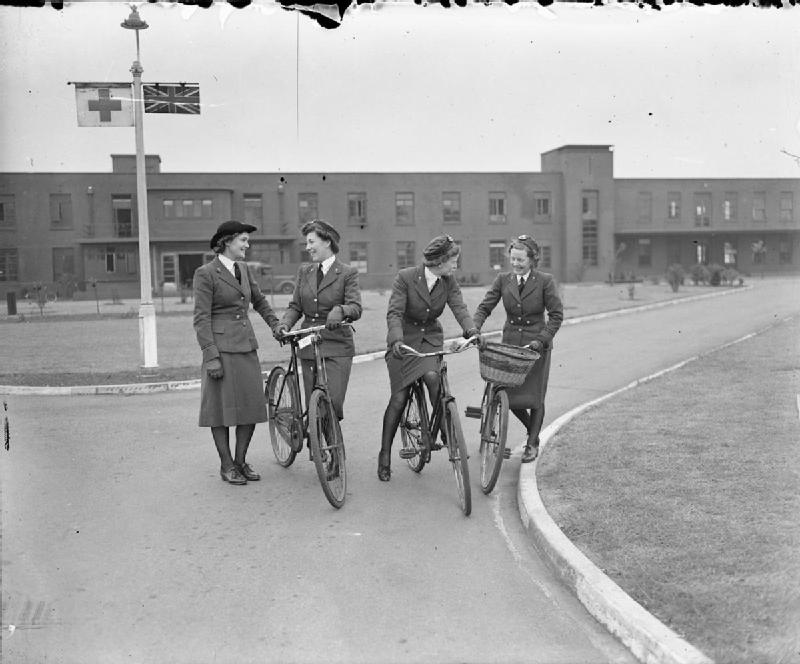
- Off-duty nursing sisters with RAF Hospital Ely behind them

Geography
- Location: Ely, Cambridgeshire, England
- Coordinates: 52.413°N 0.274°E

Organisation
- Care system: Military

Services
- Beds: 150 (1940); 168 (1987)

History
- Constructed: 1939 – 1940
- Opened: 1940
- Closed: 31 July 1992

Links
- Lists: Hospitals in England

RAF Hospital Ely (also known as RAF Ely and RAFH Ely), was a Royal Air Force staffed military hospital in Ely, Cambridgeshire, England. The hospital opened in 1940, and was one of a handful of Second World War era RAF hospitals that were kept open post Second World War, remaining a military asset until 1992, although it also treated non-service patients, usually those who lived locally. On closure, the hospital became a civilian hospital under the NHS. Although not located on an established RAF Base (unlike RAFH Cosford and RAFH Halton), RAFH Ely was located within 50 miles (80 km) of forty RAF bases in the Second World War.

== History ==
Groundwork for the hospital was started as far back as 1937, although actual construction started in 1939, and by June 1940, the hospital was opened with a capacity of 197 beds. Originally, land on High Barnes Road was allocated for the hospital, but this was moved further north to the road out of Ely to Chettisham. The first part to open was at Littleport, which became an annexe of the Ely Hospital. The facility at Littleport (5 miles (8 km) to the north), was opened hurriedly when on the outbreak of war, the Ely facility was not completed in time.

An August 1940 opening was worked on the basis of the hospital not being complete, however, in terms of the other RAF hospitals, it was quite modern in having air-conditioning and was designed to be blast-proof. An enemy bomber did drop some ordnance near to the hospital in February 1941, killing a guard, and although all the glass in the hospital was smashed, there was no structural damage. Due to many of the East Anglian regiments and Air Force personnel serving in the Far East, Ely hospital became a unit which specialised in tropical diseases. The hospital also had a maxillo-facial unit which opened in June 1942, the first ever in an RAF Hospital, and was staffed by a dental officer who had been specially trained in that area. Selected staff attended the emergency medical section at East Grinstead, which was noted in its pioneering use of plastic surgery on the burns suffered by aircrew. These staff were then returned to their units, with the RAF hospitals at Halton, Rauceby, Cosford and Ely having special burns units. By the time the hospital was running at full-strength, it could cater for over forty RAF stations within a 50 miles (80 km) radius. Many of the patients who were treated at RAFH Ely during the war, were casualties from the nearby Bomber Command bases who had been injured on bombing operations over occupied Europe.

Although no airfield existed at the hospital, in the 1960s a Spitfire aircraft was transported on a low-loader from RAF Middleton-st-George to act as the hospital's gate guardian. This was replaced by a Meteor aircraft. In 1962, nurse training was formalised at Ely and Wroughton hospitals; both female and male nurses would enlist doing six-weeks basic training at RAF Halton camp (not the hospital), and then move to Ely or Wroughton for three years of nursing training. As a post-war service, the hospital also treated non-service personnel from the local area (there was also another hospital, The Tower Hospital, in Ely), and had an accident and emergency unit which was opened in 1963. In 1973, the hospital treated 31,000 outpatients, and 6,000 inpatients, of which, at least 30% were civilian patients. In September 1977, the hospital was given the Freedom of the City of Ely. In the late 1970s, it was decided that either the hospital at Nocton Hall or Ely would close, and in 1983 Nocton Hall closed. RAFH Ely accepted the work that was previously undertaken there, having a £4 million refit with two new operating theatres and four new wards.

The number of beds available for in-patients varied over the years, and numbers reflected the necessity (the Second World War) and the diminishing service community.

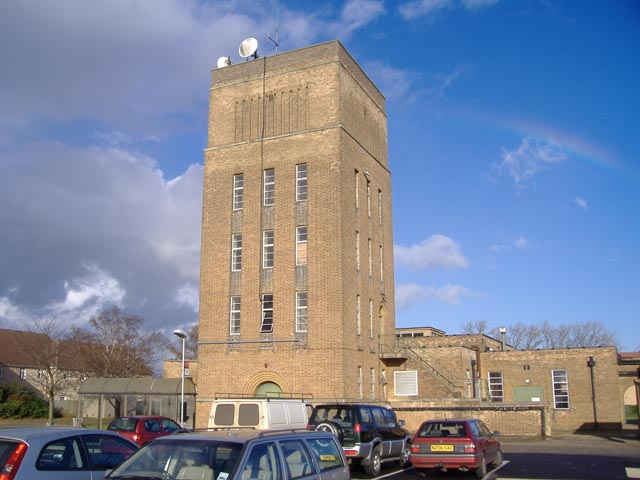
The tower at Princess of Wales Hospital, Ely. This was demolished in 2012.

Bed space numbers
Year	Beds	Ref
1940	400 (included the 250 beds at Littleport)	
1941	(315 at Ely, 250 at Littleport) 565	
1972	175	
1980	142	
1985	185	
1987	168 (65 beds specially reserved for NHS patients)	
1990	137	
1992	81	

Functions at Ely and Littleport
Ely	Littleport
General surgical (major and minor)	NYDN Centre (Not yet diagnosed neuropsychiatric)
General medical	Dermatological
Orthopaedic	Infectious diseases
Burns	Ophthalmic
Accident and Emergency (post war civilian use)	Convalescent centre (Surgical and medical)
	Invaliding holding centre

Both locations had numerous outpatients too. Besides routine medical work, and services to the local community, the hospital continued to provide specialist attention. In 1986, several air crashes resulted in pilots and aircrew being taken to RAFH Ely after ejecting for their aircraft.

Diana, Princess of Wales visited the hospital in July 1987, and unveiled its new name of the Princess of Wales Royal Air Force Hospital. In 1989, the hospital treated 13,538 outpatients and 5,652 inpatients. This represented a split of 70% civilian and 30% service personnel.

A closure programme was announced in 1990, with Ely due to go two years later. The site was closed by the RAF in July 1992, but was taken over as an NHS hospital by the local trust as a community hospital. Tower hospital in Ely closed in 1993, and all functions were transferred to the Princess of Wales site. In the 2010s, the hospital was serving 40,000 patients per year.

== Badge ==
Many RAF hospitals were opened in the Second World War period, due to its location in East Anglia near to the RAF bases of Brampton, Coltishall, Honington, Marham, Swanton Morley, West Raynham, Wattisham, and Wyton, it stayed open until 1992, (though the RAF hospitals at Halton and Wroughton survived it). As such, it was awarded a badge; which displayed a red cross with three Ducal crowns - the red cross denoted the medical help, and the crowns were adopted from the arms of the See of Ely.

The motto of the hospital was Save.

== Notable personnel ==
- James Baird, was commanding officer at the hospital in the late 1980s
- Helen Cargill, RAF matron-in-chief, worked at RAFH Ely in the 1940s
- James Coward, patient in 1940
- Nick de Bois, born at the hospital in 1962
- Geoffrey Dhenin, commanding officer from 1963 to 1966
- Jimmy Edwards, treated for burns at RAFH Ely
- Robert Gordon, member of the groundcrew on No. 9 Squadron RAF, died in the hospital at Ely from pulmonary tuberculosis in 1940
- Eric Lomax, treated after his return from the Far East
- George Henry Morley, burns and plastic surgeon specialist
- Gordon Turnbull, psychiatrist who debriefed John McCarthy, Terry Waite and Jackie Mann after being hostages, trained at Ely
- Robert Wright, radar operator who was badly burnt in a Mosquito crash in November 1944
