= Cardigan School =

Cardigan School may refer to:

- Cardigan Mountain School
- Cardigan County School
- Cardigan County Secondary School
