= North Riding Infirmary =

- South Tees Hospitals NHS Foundation Trust
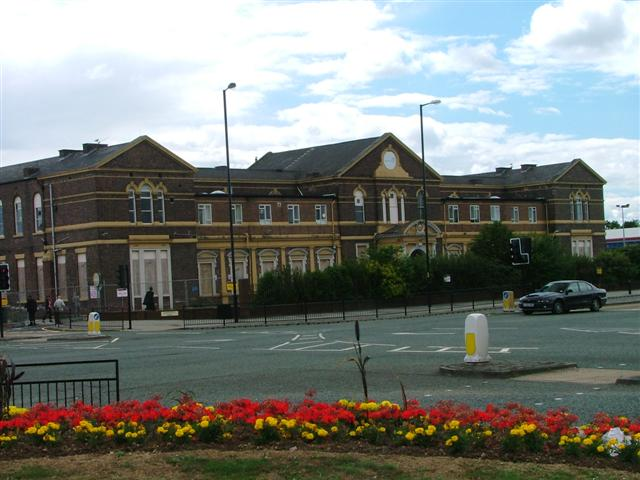

- Shown in North Yorkshire

Geography
- Location: Middlesbrough, North Yorkshire, England
- Coordinates: 54.5749°N 1.2436°W

Organisation
- Care system: NHS England

Links
- Lists: Hospitals in England

The North Riding Infirmary was a hospital in Newport Road in Middlesbrough, North Yorkshire, England.

== History ==
The foundation stone for the hospital was laid by Thomas Dundas, 2nd Earl of Zetland in Newport Road on 7 August 1860. It was designed in the Italianate style, built in brick with stone dressings and was officially opened by the industrialist, Henry Bolckow, in June 1864. It was extended at the north and south ends at the expense of the industrialist, Sir Bernhard Samuelson, in 1906. It joined the National Health Service in 1948.

The local ear, nose and throat support group raised funds totalling £1,268 for an infusion pump in 1990. The North Riding Infirmary, the Middlesbrough General Hospital, and the neuro-rehabilitation unit at West Lane Hospital were all replaced by the James Cook University Hospital in 2001. The old hospital was demolished in 2006, and a supermarket was subsequently built on the site.

== Notable staff ==
- Emily Sophia Nowers (1854–1936), matron 1897 until she retired in 1921. Nowers trained under Eva Luckes at The London Hospital in Whitechapel between 1884 and 1886.
