= Raymond Hesselyn =

New Zealand WWII flying ace (1921–1963)

Raymond Brown Hesselyn
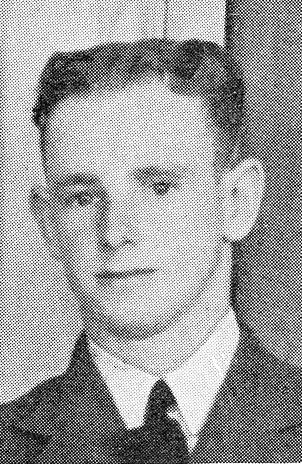
- Born: 13 March 1921; Dunedin, New Zealand
- Died: 14 November 1963 (aged 42); RAF Hospital Uxbridge, England
- Burial place: Hillingdon and Uxbridge Cemetery, Hillingdon, England
- Military career
- Allegiance: New Zealand; United Kingdom
- Branch: Royal New Zealand Air Force (1940–46); Royal Air Force (1947–63)
- Service years: 1940–1963
- Rank: Squadron Leader
- Nickname: 'Hess'
- Commands: No. 41 Squadron (1951–1952)
- Conflicts: Second World War; Channel Front; Siege of Malta
- Awards: Member of the Order of the British Empire; Distinguished Flying Cross; Distinguished Flying Medal & Bar
- Other work: Co-author of Spitfires Over Malta

Raymond Brown Hesselyn, MBE, DFC, DFM & Bar (13 March 1921 – 14 November 1963) was a New Zealand fighter pilot and flying ace of the Second World War, credited with the destruction of at least 18 enemy aircraft while flying with the Royal Air Force (RAF) over Europe and the Mediterranean.

Born in Dunedin, Hesselyn joined the Royal New Zealand Air Force in 1940 and completed his flight training the following year. He was sent to Europe to serve with the RAF. Initially flying operations on the Channel Front, he was later sent to Malta as a reinforcement for the island's aerial defences. Flying with No. 249 Squadron, Hesselyn's first 12 victories were claimed during the defence of Malta in the period from March to July 1942. Repatriated to England for a rest, he later collaborated with the Australian flying ace Virgil Brennan in the writing of Spitfires over Malta, a book about their experiences on the island. Returning to flight operations after a period of instructing duties, he flew a number of operations on the Channel Front with No. 222 Squadron before he was shot down and made a prisoner of war in October 1943. Liberated in 1945, he formally transferred to the RAF two years later and attained the rank of squadron leader before his death in 1963 of stomach cancer, aged 42.

== Early life ==
Raymond Brown Hesselyn was born in Dunedin, New Zealand, on 13 March 1921, one of three sons of George Hesselyn, a carpenter, and Majorie née Wilkie. Around 1923–24, the family moved to Oamaru, where Hesselyn was educated. He attended Oamaru North School before going on to Waitaki Boys' High School where one of his classmates was Fraser Barron, who would become a notable bomber pilot during the Second World War. In 1937, the family moved to Invercargill and Hesselyn briefly attended Southland Boys' High School. Later in the year he took up an apprenticeship as a machinist at a joinery factory. At about the same time, he joined the Territorial Force, serving in the 1st Southland Regiment.

== Second World War ==
At the outbreak of the Second World War, Hesselyn was a corporal in the Territorial Force. When the 2nd New Zealand Expeditionary Force was being raised soon afterwards he was offered a commission to join. He declined in favour of enlisting in the Royal New Zealand Air Force (RNZAF) and was formally attested on 23 June 1940. Basic training was at Levin before he proceeded to Taieri to learn how to fly on Tiger Moths. By February 1941 he had gained his aircrew brevet. He had also acquired the nickname 'Hess'. Training continued and he had an accident when trying to land the Vickers Vincent he was flying and crashed into Lake Grassmere. His judgement was found to be at fault.

After a period of leave, Hesselyn was posted to Britain to serve with the Royal Air Force (RAF) and departed in April aboard the ocean liner Aorangi. By July, he was in England and was on a flying refresher course, training on Miles Masters before proceeding to Hawker Hurricane fighters. In September he went to No. 61 Operational Training Unit (OTU), to become familiar with the Supermarine Spitfire fighter before being posted to No. 501 Squadron at Ibsley the following month. He was only there for three weeks before he was transferred to No. 234 Squadron having been promoted a flight sergeant. For the next several weeks, the squadron was engaged in convoy patrols and also flew to the Low Countries to draw out enemy fighters. One major mission in early December involved several fighter squadrons, Hesselyn's among them, escorting bombers to Brest.

=== Malta ===
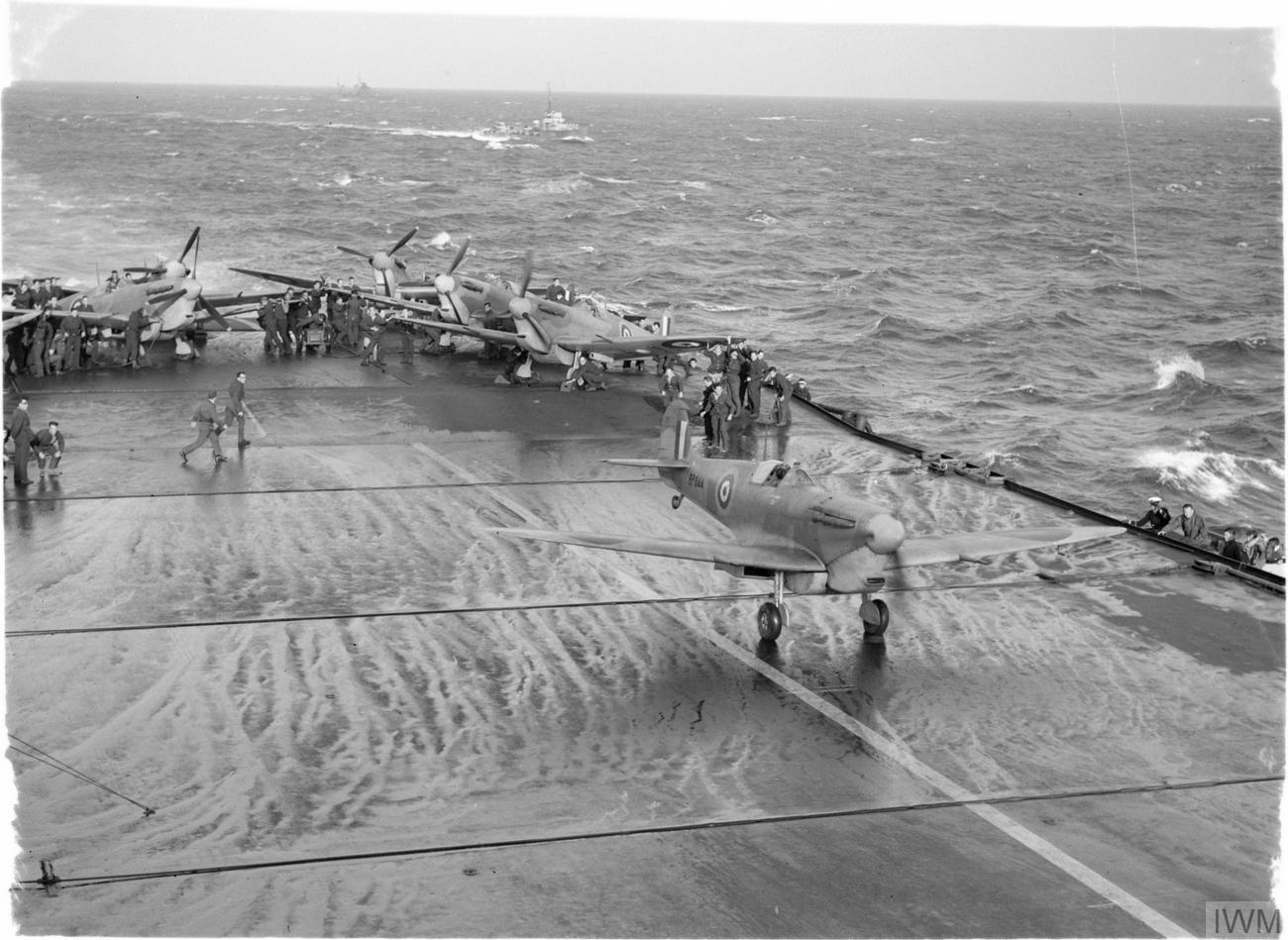
A Spitfire taking off from the deck of the aircraft carrier HMS Eagle

Hesselyn volunteered for an overseas posting and in February 1942, he was advised that he was to be sent to Malta, where he would join the island's air defences during incessant Axis attacks. Along with several other pilots, he was dispatched to Gibraltar and then transferred to the aircraft carrier HMS Eagle from which they were to fly Spitfires to Malta. An attempt to fly off the carrier on 26 February had to be cancelled due to malfunctioning long-range fuel tanks but on 7 March he and 14 other pilots took off from the deck of Eagle and flew for 4 hours to the island. Troubled by a malfunctioning undercarriage, he was the last pilot to land. The arrival of the Spitfires was a significant boost to Malta's aerial defences, which previously comprised 21 operational Hurricanes.

The Spitfires and their pilots were all assigned to No. 249 Squadron, commanded by Squadron Leader Stan Turner and operating from RAF Ta Kali. Hesselyn's first operational flight with the squadron was on 11 March, when he and three other Spitfire pilots and 16 Hurricanes intercepted a small bombing raid. He had a faulty gunsight and radio which meant he took little part in the ensuing dogfight. The following days were busy as the air defences were repeatedly scrambled to deal with bombing raids mounted by the Luftwaffe. However, as there were more pilots than Spitfires, Hesselyn had to share his aircraft and only flew a total of six sorties in March. On 1 April Hesselyn, while on patrol north of Grand Harbour, shot down a Messerschmitt Bf 109 fighter that was escorting a flying boat. He became caught up in celebrating his victory and was nearly shot down himself. Later in the day, he was part of a group of Spitfires scrambled to intercept an incoming bombing raid and shot down a Junkers Ju 87 dive bomber.

Availability of aircraft continued to limit Hesselyn's flying time for the first two weeks of April, and he was kept occupied with construction of air defences, but in the meantime the squadron's successes grew. On 20 April, he and another pilot were sent to provide cover for a group of Spitfires returning to the airfield after being scrambled to intercept a bombing raid. They encountered four Bf 109 fighters and after getting into a dogfight with one, Hesselyn shot it down off St. Paul's Bay. Making his way back to the airfield, he came across a Junkers Ju 88 medium bomber. His attack ended prematurely when his cannons jammed so he was only able to claim the bomber as damaged. The next day he damaged a Bf 109 in the morning and then around noon was scrambled to intercept an incoming bomber raid. He engaged the escorting Bf 109s and destroyed one. On his return to Ta Kali, he found it under attack by Ju 87s. He shot down one and also damaged a Bf 109 that was strafing the airfield. Having now destroyed at least five enemy aircraft, he was considered a flying ace. He shot down another Ju 87 over Ta Kali on 26 April but Hesselyn, leading a section of Spitfires for the first time, was attacked by Bf 109s immediately afterwards. Despite using up his remaining ammunition in engaging them, he was unable to cause any damage.

Activity remained hectic in May, with Hesselyn and another pilot scrambled on 2 May to try and intercept Ju 88s attacking Luqa. His attack on the Ju 88s was hindered by Bf 109s and he was driven off, one of a few unsuccessful engagements for the first week of the month, often heavily outnumbered, although he did claim a damaged Bf 109 on 4 May. Four days later, he was informed that he was to be awarded the Distinguished Flying Medal (DFM). The citation for the award, published in the London Gazette read:

Sergeant Hesselyn is a skilful and gallant pilot. Undeterred by odds, he presses home his attacks with outstanding determination. He has destroyed 5 enemy aircraft, 2 of which he shot down in one engagement.

— London Gazette, No. 35569, 22 May 1942

On 10 May, Hesselyn's was one of 20 Spitfires scrambled to intercept around 20 Ju 88s, escorted by Bf 109s, approaching Grand Harbour. While his wingman targeted a Ju 88, Hesselyn's Spitfire was damaged by a Bf 109, with a bullet damaging his flying helmet. He promptly took evasive action, which saw the attacking aircraft overshoot him and enter the range of his cannons; he opened fire and destroyed the Bf 109. Despite the damage to his aircraft, Hesselyn was able to land but, suffering from shock, was sent for bed rest. The aircraft he had shot down was considered only probably destroyed, due to a lack of witnesses to confirm its destruction. Returning to flying operations, Hesselyn shot down another Bf 109 on 12 May; this was seen to crash into the sea 20 miles (32 km) south of Malta. Coming back over Kalafrana Bay, he encountered more Bf 109s and engaged one, damaging it. The entire sortie was flown at low level since he found his oxygen supply was lacking. He shot down two more Bf 109s the next day and then on 14 May, destroyed a Ju 88. On 20 May, Hesselyn was advised that he was to be the recipient of a bar to his DFM, the only New Zealander to be recognised with this award. The award was officially announced in the London Gazette on 29 May; the published citation read:

During a period of 4 days' operations in May, 1942, this airman destroyed 5 enemy aircraft bringing his victories to 10. Although fighting at great odds in the heavy raids on Malta, Flight Sergeant Hesselyn never hesitates in his efforts to destroy the enemy. His courage and devotion to duty are outstanding.

— London Gazette, No. 35577, 29 May 1942

Axis activity over Malta during the day began to drop off towards the end of the month, and this continued into June with more raids being mounted at night and fewer opportunities for the units equipped with daytime fighter aircraft, such as No. 249 Squadron. In the meantime, Hesselyn was commissioned as a pilot officer but otherwise had a quiet June. On 8 July he shot down a Bf 109, and later that day he was credited with the destruction of a Ju 88. By this time, he was deemed to need a rest and shortly afterwards was sent back to England. During his time on Malta, he was credited with destroying twelve enemy aircraft.

=== Europe ===
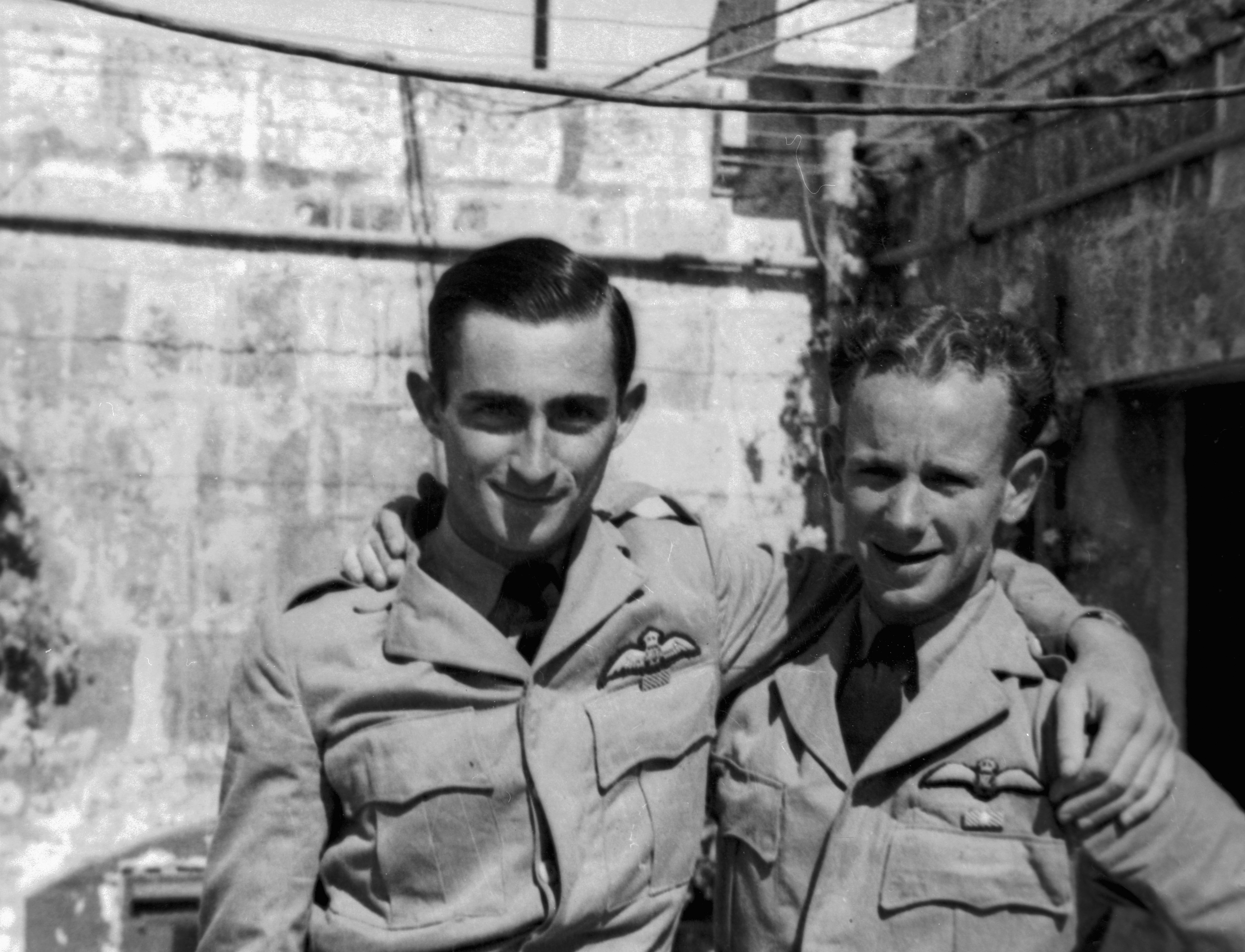
Paul Brennan, of the Royal Australian Air Force (left), and Hesselyn at RAF Ta Kali, 1942

Hesselyn arrived in England with another No. 249 Squadron pilot, Flight Lieutenant Virgil "Paul" Brennan. While in London on leave, they met with expatriate journalists who convinced the two pilots to write a book about their experiences on Malta. Working with Henry Bateson over a two-week period, this resulted in Spitfires over Malta. The book proved to be a major success. At the end of his leave, Hesselyn was posted to No. 61 OTU in Shropshire on instructing duties for six months. By October he felt well rested and ready to return to operations but had to see out the term of his posting.

In early 1943 Hesselyn returned to No. 501 Squadron, his former unit, which at the time was based in Northern Ireland. In April, it was moved to Westhampnett and then onto Martlesham Heath. While at the latter station, Hesselyn occasionally flew with No. 277 Squadron, passing on his experience to its pilots. On 22 June, leading a section of Spitfires on an aerial search and rescue mission involving escorting two Supermarine Walruses, he was credited with damaging a Focke-Wulf Fw 190 fighter.

The following month, Hesselyn was posted to No. 222 Squadron, based at Hornchurch, as a flight commander. At the time he joined the squadron, it was equipped with Spitfire Mk. IXs and was part of the Hornchurch Wing which was commanded by fellow New Zealander Wing Commander Bill Crawford-Compton. The wing regularly flew on fighter sweeps and raids, termed 'Ramrods', to Europe for the next few weeks, often flying twice a day. By the end of August he had flown 27 sorties and was a flying officer. He shot down two Bf 109s while escorting B-17 Flying Fortresses to Walcheren on 17 August. Another pilot in his section shot down two Bf 109s in the same sortie and it was the squadron's most successful day since the Battle of Britain. Two days later, he shared in the destruction of a further Bf 109. By this time, the squadron had upgraded to the new Spitfire IX (LF) aircraft. On 22 August, while flying his third operation of the day, Hesselyn engaged a Fw 190. Although he observed a number of strikes on the enemy fighter and it went into a shallow dive, he did not see it go down. It was claimed as a probable. He destroyed a Fw 190 on 27 August, while escorting B-17s to Saint-Omer.

September was also busy, and Hesselyn destroyed his first aircraft of the month on 4 September, shooting down a Bf 109. Later in the month he was promoted to flight lieutenant and then went on leave, returning to operations on 24 September when he led one of the squadron's flights on a mission escorting North American B-25 Mitchell medium bombers attacking railway infrastructure at Amiens. Three days later, while providing cover for Martin B-26 Marauders bombing Beauvais, Hesselyn shot down a Fw 190.

No. 222 Squadron was rested for a few days and did not resume operations until 2 October, when the Hornchurch Wing provided cover for Consolidated B-24 Liberators attacking a target in occupied Holland. The next day, he flew his 69th and final operation with the squadron when the Hornchurch Wing went on a Ramrod mission, acting as high cover for several B-26 Marauders heading for Beauvais. The bombers were attacked by over 40 German fighters and No. 222 Squadron flew in to engage the enemy. In the dogfight that followed, Hesselyn shot down a Bf 109 which was seen to crash into a wooded area. He was then attacked by a Fw 190, which set his Spitfire on fire. He was forced to bail out of his burning aircraft, and on landing was made a prisoner of war (POW). According to Caldwell, three Luftwaffe pilots filed claims over a Spitfire in the area of Beauvais and may have been responsible for shooting him down: Feldwebel Gerd Wiegand, Major Klaus Mietusch and Hauptmann Hermann Staiger. Initially reported as missing it was not until towards the end of the year that it was confirmed that he was a POW. In the meantime, his award of the Distinguished Flying Cross had been announced. The citation read:

This officer has destroyed at least 17 enemy aircraft. His successes are a fine tribute to his great skill, courage and keenness.

— London Gazette, No. 36223, 26 October 1943

=== Prisoner of war ===
After his capture, Hesselyn was hospitalised at Beauvais for treatment of injuries sustained as he was shot down and was not transferred to Germany until the end of October. He was sent to the Stalag Luft I prisoner of war camp, near Barth in the northeast of Germany. On 22 January 1944, Hesselyn and another man escaped from the camp. They had hidden in the ceiling space of the camp theatre in the late afternoon and that night sneaked out and, avoiding sentries, scaled a gate undetected by searchlights. They were caught the next day by policemen at Velgast, to the southwest of the camp, when attempting to enter a railway marshalling yard. Taken back to Stalag Luft I, the escapees were placed in solitary confinement for two weeks, with limited rations. In later life, Hesselyn alleged that he had also been castrated by the Germans as punishment.

At the end of his solitary confinement, Hesselyn rejoined his fellow captives. Appointed a personnel officer, he kept records on the POWs that were passed to the Air Ministry after the war. Stalag Luft I was liberated by the Russian Army on 1 May 1945, and two weeks later Hesselyn was repatriated back to England. As a result of his conduct as a POW, he was made a Member of the Order of the British Empire, the announcement being made in the London Gazette on 28 December 1945.

== Postwar career ==
After a period of recuperation following his release from captivity, in April 1946 Hesselyn was sent to No. 1 Squadron at Tangmere, where he was a flight commander. In September, he participated in a flypast involving over 300 fighters flying over London in celebration of Battle of Britain Day. Shortly afterwards, the squadron began converting to the Gloster Meteor jet fighter, having previously been equipped with Spitfires.

Hesselyn went to New Zealand in March 1947 to visit his family. He attended a number of functions in his honour but did not enjoy the attention and family members noted he kept late hours, struggled to sleep, and also drank heavily. In June, he formally resigned from the RNZAF and transferred to the RAF, being appointed to a four–year commission as a flight lieutenant. Back in the United Kingdom, he was posted to No. 56 Squadron, which operated Meteors. During his time there, he also attended a junior commanders course.

In August 1948, he married Alfreda Ratten in a civil ceremony in London. She was a divorcee and was nine years older than Hesselyn. He was financially well off, with his book having sold in excess of 50,000 copies. With co-author Brennan having died earlier in the war, all royalties went to Hesselyn.

The following month he was granted a permanent commission in the RAF. After a period on staff duties at the headquarters of Fighter Command, in 1951 Hesselyn was posted as commander of No. 41 Squadron, the last fighter squadron to be based at Biggin Hill station. His final promotion, to squadron leader, came at the start of the year. In November 1952, he was posted to No. 233 Operational Conversion Unit, based at Pembrey in Wales. By this time he had developed a reputation as being a difficult commander, prone to losing his temper over minor issues, and continuing to excessively consume alcohol. At one stage while at Pembrey, he was disciplined for performing aerobatics and low-level flying over the airfield after performing a weather check in a de Havilland Vampire. He was disciplined again for an incident where he was careless with the discharge of a rifle while target shooting.

In 1954 Hesselyn was posted to Germany to serve as a plans officer with the headquarters of No. 83 Group at the RAF base at Wahn, Cologne. He then returned to the United Kingdom and was assigned to RAF Horsham St Faith as a recovery officer. A posting with No. 217 Signals Unit followed. In early 1960 he returned to the headquarters of Fighter Command in a staff role.

Hesselyn's health began to decline in April 1963 due to what was initially believed to be a stomach ulcer, but was later found to be cancer; he died at the RAF Hospital at Uxbridge on 14 November 1963, aged 42. He is buried in the Hillingdon and Uxbridge Cemetery at Hillingdon.

Hesselyn is credited with 18 enemy aircraft destroyed, a half share in another, two probably destroyed, and seven damaged. After his death, his wife returned his medals to his parents; they were later sold to an Australian collector, and in 1998 came up for sale at auction in London, where they fetched £7,200.
