= Friarage Hospital =

Hospital in North Yorkshire, England

- South Tees Hospitals NHS Foundation Trust
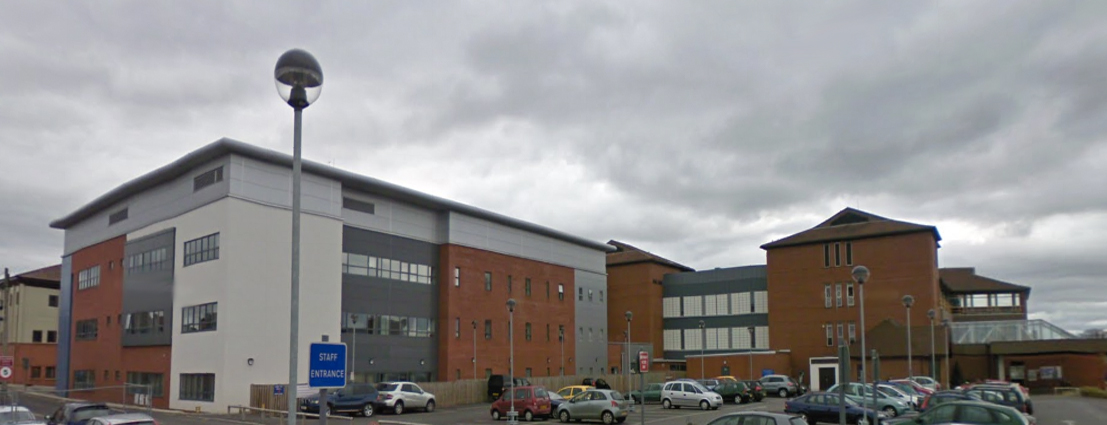
- The western aspect of Friarage Hospital

- Location within North Yorkshire

Geography
- Location: Northallerton, North Yorkshire, England
- Coordinates: 54°20′32.4″N 1°25′51.4″W

Organisation
- Care system: NHS England
- Type: District General
- Affiliated university: Newcastle University Medical School; Hull York Medical School
- Network: South Tees Hospitals NHS Foundation Trust

Services
- Emergency department: Yes
- Beds: 189

History
- Former name: RAF Hospital Northallerton

Links
- Website: Official website
- Lists: Hospitals in England

Friarage Hospital is a 189-bed hospital located in Northallerton, North Yorkshire, England. The hospital covers a large section of rural North Yorkshire and the Vale of York which amounts to over 120,000 people in 390 square miles (1,000 km^{2}). The hospital is run by the South Tees Hospitals NHS Foundation Trust and is one of six hospitals in the trust's portfolio.

In April 2020, the Accident and Emergency section of the hospital was downgraded into an Urgent Treatment Centre (UTC), with the most serious of casualty cases being taken to other hospitals.

== History ==
The hospital was opened in 1938, and had been built on the site of a Carmelite friary, though some of the still extant buildings on the site were part of the Northallerton Workhouse. It was originally intended that civilian casualties of bombing raids on Teesside would be brought to the hospital for treatment. Between 1943 and 1947, it served as RAF Hospital Northallerton, as part of the chain of Royal Air Force hospitals across the world. It was returned to civilian use in 1947 before being renamed as the Friarage in 1948 when the National Health Service was formed. Student training for nurses was initiated in January 1949. The Northallerton Health Services NHS Trust was established in 1991 and ran the hospital until April 2002, when it merged with South Tees Hospital Trust. One year after the merger of the trusts, the Friarage received an £18 million facelift.

In July 1999, the hospital acquired a Military Defence Hospital Unit after the closure of the Duchess of Kent's Military Hospital at Catterick Garrison. Military medical personnel still work at the Friarage with other military staff also undertaking some clinical tasks at James Cook University Hospital.

In November 2012, all surgery was stopped at the Friarage due to a flood. A stream, known as Sun Beck, flows through the town and is covered over from just outside the hospital to a car park west of the High Street in Northallerton. The flood led to the North Yorkshire Fire and Rescue Service having to pump the water away from the hospital into another stream to the north west of the town.

In 2017, overnight Accident and Emergency admissions were sent to James Cook University Hospital. This led to some people to labelling the scheme as "closure by stealth". The accident and emergency department was downgraded to a 24/7 Urgent Treatment Centre (UTC) in February 2019 because of staff shortages. Average attendance is about 60 a day. After a public consultation, the UTC was made permanent in April 2020.

== Facilities ==
The hospital serves a region that stretches from the top of York to the town of Darlington and incorporates most of the central band of North Yorkshire up to the central Pennines in the west. This accounts for over 120,000 people in a region that covers 390 square miles (1,000 km^{2}).

When inspected by the Care Quality Commission in June 2016, the CQC determined that hospital was performing to a Good standard. (Note: The CQC has a four stage rating; *Outstanding *Good *Requires Improvement *Inadequate) It was inspected again during 2022/2023 and was gain rated Good overall by the CQC. (Note: The CQC assessed all hospitals in the South Tees Hospitals NHS Foundation Trust in the report. Individual data about Friarage is in the report on page 21)

A new cancer treatment centre called The Sir Robert Ogden Macmillan Cancer Centre is located on the site. Jointly funded by Sir Robert Ogden and Macmillan Cancer Relief, the centre cost £10 million and brings cancer care, treatment and counselling under one roof. The centre was due to open in October 2018, but was delayed until 11 December 2018.

A new surgical unit is to be built on the site and is projected to open in 2025. This is to include six main surgical theatres, two minor theatres, a day unit and an admission centre. The new unit is estimated to cost £35.5 million (2023), and will increase surgical cases from 5,000 to nearly 10,000 per year.

== Controversies ==
In 2000, a consultant who had worked at the hospital between 1985 and 1998, was struck off by the General Medical Council (GMC) for botching 12 operations on women whilst he was working at the hospital. Some of the women were left in "agonising pain" and, in some cases, the women were not able to have children afterwards. The Friarage had decided to bring medical malpractice charges against the consultant, but his lawyer had advised the hospital that the legal action could take years. The hospital paid the consultant off and gave him a good appraisal which allowed him to carry on working at another hospital in England before charges were brought by the GMC. It was since revealed that he had also been struck off the medical register in Canada for "serious incompetence" involving the deaths of two women. In 2000, the hospital sacked another doctor who had been having an affair with one of his patients. The second consultant had been hired to replace the previous consultant who had been paid off.

In 2012, South Tees Hospitals NHS Foundation Trust announced plans to downgrade the maternity services offered by the hospital. North Yorkshire County Council asked the Health Secretary, Jeremy Hunt MP, to review the proposals in December 2012. The plans led to a march through Northallerton town centre by 4,000 people, at the end of which one of the many speeches given opposing the plans, was by William Hague, who was still the MP for Richmond.

In May 2014, Jeremy Hunt approved the plan to switch from a consultant-led maternity department to one that was led by midwives. The plan was very unpopular with the local community and whilst it would not mean the cessation of maternity services, those pregnant mothers with illnesses or complications would have to travel a further 22 miles (35 km) to James Cook University Hospital.
