= James Cook University Hospital =

- South Tees Hospitals NHS Foundation Trust
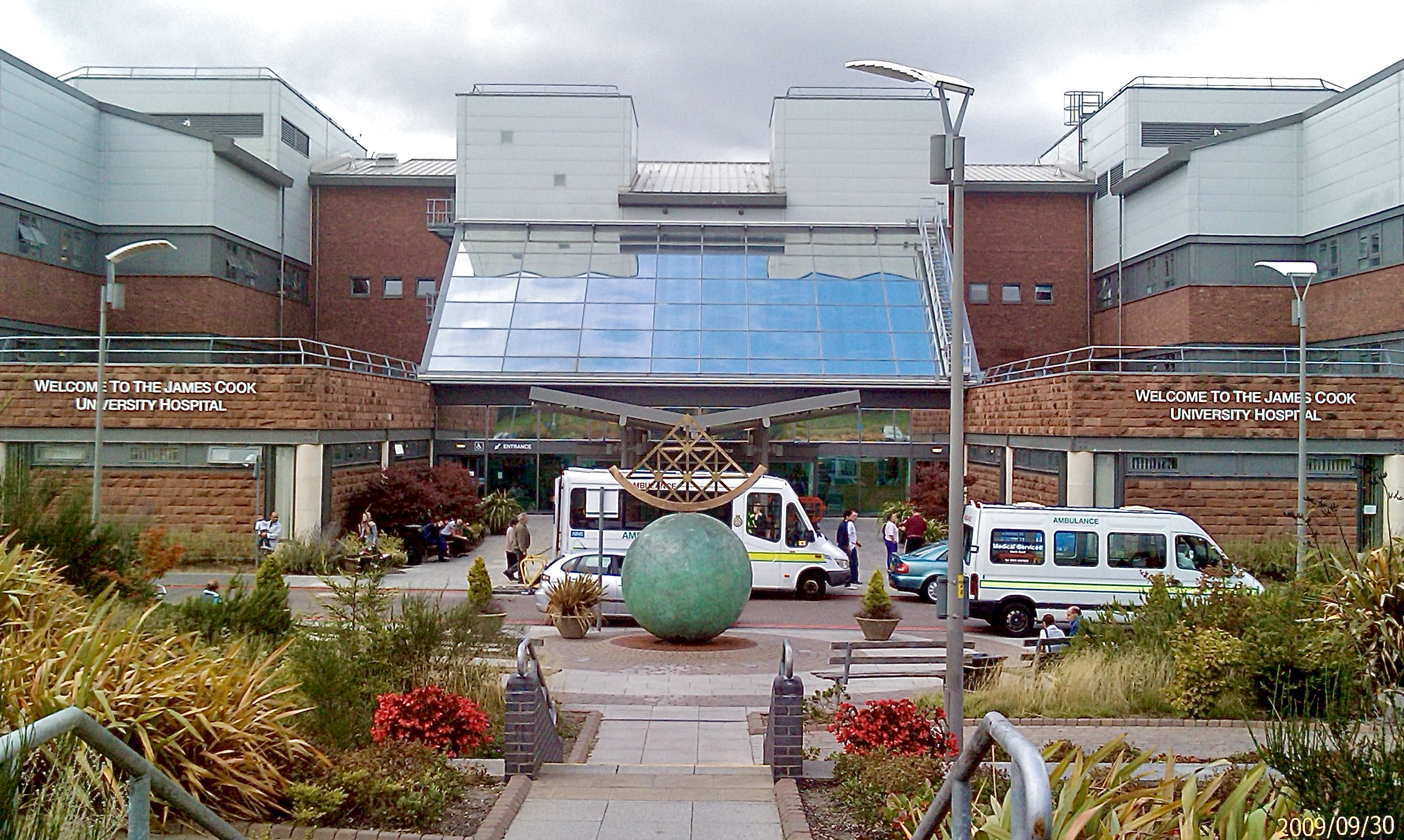

- Shown in North Yorkshire

Geography
- Location: Middlesbrough, North Yorkshire, England
- Coordinates: 54.552°N 1.214°W

Organisation
- Care system: NHS England
- Type: Teaching, military
- Affiliated university: Newcastle University School of Medicine and Hull York Medical School

Services
- Emergency department: Yes – Major Trauma Centre
- Beds: 1,046

History
- Founded: November 1981

Links
- Website: www.southtees.nhs.uk/hospitals/james-cook
- Lists: Hospitals in England

The James Cook University Hospital, formerly known as the South Cleveland Hospital, is a public tertiary referral hospital and regional major trauma centre in Middlesbrough, North Yorkshire, England with 1,046 beds. It forms part of the South Tees Hospitals NHS Foundation Trust, along with the Friarage Hospital in Northallerton.

== History ==
Construction of the hospital began in 1980 on the parkland of the former St Luke's Hospital, Middlesbrough. Officially opened by the Duchess of Kent in November 1981 as a tertiary care centre called South Cleveland Hospital, it later became an extensive hospital with A&E. Its maternity unit was opened by Diana, Princess of Wales in October 1988. The hospital became the James Cook University Hospital in 2001 to reflect the local heritage and growing academic links.

New facilities were procured under a Private Finance Initiative contract to replace Middlesbrough General Hospital, North Riding Infirmary in Middlesbrough and the neuro-rehabilitation unit at West Lane Hospital in 1999. These new facilities were designed by HLM Architects, built on the site by Mowlem at a cost of £96 million and opened in August 2003. The hospital was named after British explorer and Middlesbrough-born James Cook, with an official naming ceremony in April 2001.

In April 2012, the hospital became a major trauma centre for Durham, East Cleveland, Tees Valley and North Yorkshire, participating in the wider Northern trauma network.

In May 2012, a £35 million radiotherapy centre opened at the hospital, unveiled by Princess Alexandra.

In November 2012, a new 3T MRI scanner was opened, in the Neurosciences department. This is a partnership between the hospital and Durham University and in addition to clinical work will undertake research into various aspects of cognition.

In May 2014, the James Cook railway station opened adjacent to the hospital. Located on the Esk Valley line, the station provides access to the hospital via the local rail network.

In March 2015, a new purpose-built IVF unit was opened (complete with its own theatre), it now brings all the reproductive medicine services together in one place.

== Facilities ==
James Cook University Hospital specialises in the treatment of cancer, heart conditions and neurosurgery as well as housing the regional neonatal intensive care and spinal injury units. More recent developments include the introduction of advanced cardiac mapping technologies for complex radio frequency ablation, and the development of a highly successful Transcatheter Aortic Valve Intervention programme for patients deemed unfit for conventional cardiac surgery.

The hospital is used to teach clinical medical students from Newcastle University Medical School and Hull York Medical School. The hospital also has strong teaching and research links with the School of Nursing and Health at Teesside University.

The hospital also has a floodlit helipad for use by the Great North and Yorkshire air ambulances during daytime and nighttime hours.

== See also ==
- List of hospitals in England
