= Virgil Brennan =

Australian Second World War flying ace

Virgil Paul Brennan
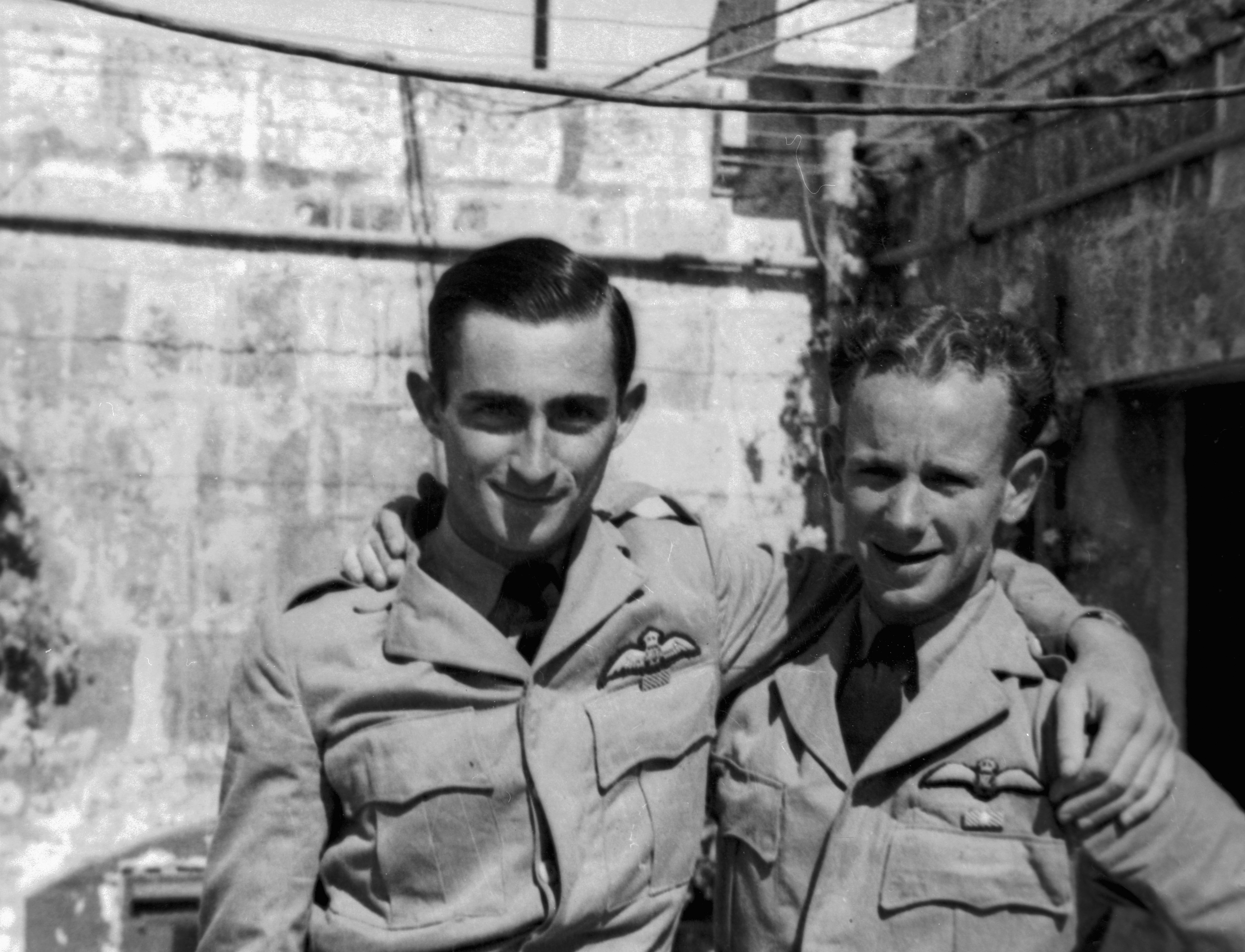
- Brennan (left) and Raymond Hesselyn at RAF Ta Kali, Malta, in 1942
- Born: 6 March 1920; Warwick, Queensland, Australia
- Died: 13 June 1943 (aged 23); Garbutt, Queensland, Australia
- Burial place: Townsville War Cemetery
- Military career
- Allegiance: Australia
- Branch: Royal Australian Air Force
- Service years: 1940–1943
- Rank: Flight Lieutenant
- Nickname: "Digger"
- Conflicts: Second World War; European Theatre; Mediterranean Theatre; Siege of Malta
- Awards: Distinguished Flying Cross; Distinguished Flying Medal
- Other work: Co-author of Spitfires over Malta

Virgil Paul Brennan, DFC, DFM (6 March 1920 – 13 June 1943), also known as Paul Brennan, was an Australian aviator and flying ace of the Second World War. Enlisting in the Royal Australian Air Force in November 1940, he briefly served in the European Theatre before transferring to Malta. Over the next five months, Brennan was credited with the destruction of 10 Axis aircraft from twenty-four operational sorties. Reposted to England, he was assigned as a flying instructor and collaborated in the writing of Spitfires over Malta, a book about his experiences on the island. Returning to Australia in 1943, Brennan was killed in a flying accident at Garbutt, Queensland, in June that year.

== Early life ==
Brennan was born in Warwick, Queensland, on 6 March 1920 to Edgar James Brennan, a solicitor, and his wife Katherine (née O'Sullivan). He was educated at the Christian Brothers' School in Warwick, before moving on to Downlands College at Toowoomba and later Brisbane State High School. After leaving school, Brennan studied part-time at the University of Queensland, while simultaneously being employed as a law clerk in Brisbane.

== Second World War ==
Brennan enlisted in the Royal Australian Air Force on 8 November 1940 for service during the Second World War. Accepted for pilot training, he received his initial flight instruction in Australia. He later embarked for Canada, where he completed his flight training. In August 1941, he was posted to the United Kingdom and appointed to an Operational Training Unit. On graduating from this course, he was allotted to No. 64 Squadron RAF. He was advanced to temporary flight sergeant on 4 January 1942, before being posted to the Mediterranean Theatre in February.

=== Malta ===
On arrival in the Mediterranean, Brennan was posted to No. 249 Squadron RAF. On 7 March 1942, he was one of fifteen pilots sent to the island of Malta. Flying Supermarine Spitfires, the party took off from the aircraft carrier HMS Eagle. They were to spend the next few months in the defence of the island. As the Axis forces commenced a major aerial assault on Malta later in March, the Allied fighter pilots on the island were forced to "contend with fatigue and inadequate rations while battling the enemy's superior forces". On 17 March, Brennan claimed his first aerial victory when he shot down a Messerschmitt Bf 109.

Brennan added a further two aircraft to his tally on 20 April 1942 when he destroyed a Messerschmitt Bf 109, before bringing down a Junkers Ju 88 later that day. Praised as "a most determined and courageous pilot", Brennan was recommended for the Distinguished Flying Medal. The announcement and accompanying citation for the award was published in a supplement to the London Gazette on 22 May 1942, reading:

Air Ministry, 22nd May, 1942.

ROYAL AIR FORCE.

The KING has been graciously pleased to approve the following awards in recognition of gallantry displayed in flying operations against the enemy: —

Distinguished Flying Medal.

Aus. 404692 Sergeant Virgil Paul BRENNAN, Royal Australian Air Force, No. 249 Squadron.

This airman is a most determined and courageous pilot. An exceptional shot, he always presses home his attacks with vigour. In 2 combats, he has destroyed at least 4 enemy aircraft and damaged others.

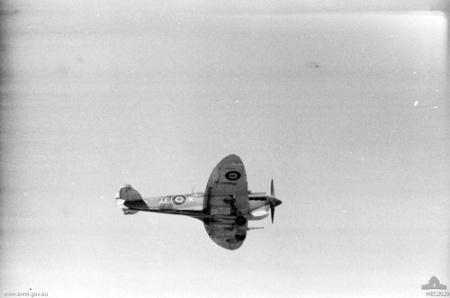
A Supermarine Spitfire operating off Malta.

Brennan scored further aerial victories on 10 May. The following day, German Luftwaffe General Albert Kesselring ordered a contingent of 20 Stukas and 10 Junkers Ju 88s with a small escort of fighter aircraft to bomb Grand Harbour, Malta. A formation of 50 Royal Air Force aircraft—37 Spitfires and 13 Hawker Hurricanes—were dispatched to intercept the group; Brennan was piloting one of the Spitfires. Attacking one of the Stukas, Brennan later recorded that the aircraft "disintegrated, with huge chunks flying off in every direction". During the battle, 14 German aircraft were shot down, for the loss of 2 Spitfires. In an engagement the next day, Brennan was wounded in his left arm. He was commissioned as a pilot officer later that month.

By the conclusion of his combat tour in July 1942, Brennan had flown twenty-two operational sorties and was credited with destroying 10 Axis aircraft over Malta, with one probably destroyed and a further 6 damaged. For his efforts in the destruction of Axis aircraft during this period, Brennan was awarded the Distinguished Flying Cross. The notification of the decoration was published in a supplement to the London Gazette on 6 October 1942.

=== Later war service and death ===
Embarking from Malta during July 1942, Brennan returned to the United Kingdom and was posted to No. 52 Operational Training Unit as an instructor with the rank of acting flight lieutenant. During this period, Brennan and fellow No. 249 Squadron pilot, Pilot Officer Raymond Hesselyn, collaborated with journalist Henry Bateson on writing Spitfires over Malta, a novel relating the experiences of Brennan and Hesselyn during their time on Malta. On 17 April 1943, Brennan was repatriated from the United Kingdom and returned to Australia.

Arriving back in Australia, Brennan was posted to the newly raised No. 79 Squadron, based at Laverton, Victoria, on 1 May 1943. Later that month, the squadron was ordered to deploy to Goodenough Island, near New Guinea. During this time, Brennan related his previous combat experiences to fellow pilots, however his commanding officer, Squadron Leader Alan Rawlinson, noted that Brennan appeared "strained and tired". An advance party of the squadron was moved up to Goodenough Island that month, while the pilots followed during June.

On 13 June 1943, the pilots of No. 79 Squadron continued on their journey north, arriving at Garbutt airfield in Queensland. At approximately 14:00, Brennan landed his Spitfire in the wake turbulence of the aircraft ahead of himself and touched down on the left side of the runway. Brennan was informed that he was cutting in on the path of the Spitfire following him, which was to land on the right side of the runway. Brennan landed his aircraft short, and at the conclusion of his landing run turned across the path of the second Spitfire. In the ensuing collision, Brennan sustained severe injuries and was rushed to hospital; he died before arrival. Described as one with "an easy-going nature, an engaging sense of humour and ... loyal to his friends", Brennan was buried in Townsville War Cemetery.

== See also ==
- List of World War II aces from Australia
