= Iris Bower =

Royal Air Force nurse

Iris Bower MBE, ARRC
- Born: Iris Jones; 12 April 1915; Cardigan, Wales
- Died: 18 December 2005 (aged 90); Radlett, Hertfordshire
- Other name: Iris Ogilvie
- Spouse(s): Donald Ogilvie (m. 1942; died 1943) William Bower (m. 1949; died 1977)
- Children: 2
- Military career
- Allegiance: United Kingdom
- Royal Air Force: PMRAFNS
- Service years: 1939–1949
- Rank: Squadron officer
- Nickname: Fluffy
- Service number: 5170
- Unit: No. 50 Mobile Field Hospital
- Conflicts: World War II; Operation Overlord

Iris "Fluffy" Bower MBE, ARRC (12 April 1915 – 18 December 2005) (also known as Iris Ogilvie) was a British nurse who served in the Princess Mary's Royal Air Force Nursing Service during Second World War. She was one of only two women in Normandy during the first few days of the D-Day campaign, and attended patients at the Bergen-Belsen concentration camp in Germany. Prior to D-Day, she had been in two different RAF hospitals which had suffered from bombing raids.

== Early life ==
Iris Jones was born in a small hamlet near to Cardigan in Wales, on 12 April 1915. Jones was educated at Cardigan Grammar School, and on leaving, went to London to train as a nurse at St Mary's Hospital, Paddington.

== Military life ==
Bower applied to join the PMRAFNS in June 1939 among twenty hopefuls for only two vacancies. At the interview, she was asked if she spoke any other languages (than English), to which she replied "Welsh". This saw her through, as the interviewing officers' mother was from Wales. It was not long after she was accepted into the PMRAFNS that she earned the nickname Fluffy; a reference to her "halo of fluffy golden curls.." In August 1940, Bower was working at the RAF Hospital at St Athan in South Wales, when it was bombed. In April 1942, she was working at RAF Hospital Torquay, and had just married Donald Ogilvie, who was convalescing at the same hospital. He later returned to his unit, and the newly married Bower stayed behind. On 25 October 1942, Bower was subjected to another bombing when the Luftwaffe raided the Torquay area. Bower had just left one room of the hospital, when she saw the bomber approaching through the windows. She dived under a bed for cover and a bomb struck the building and shattered almost all of the glass. Of the 19 people who died in the raid, one was a fellow nurse that Bower had been talking to only moments earlier.

In August 1943, Bower joined No. 50 Mobile Field Hospital (MFH) - part of No. 83 Group RAF. She stated that she wanted to do something for the war effort after her first husband's death - he had been killed on a raid over the Netherlands. "I was devastated. He had died for his country, and I didn't care what happened to me. I knew I wanted to make some contribution myself." At first, there was some vocal resistance from the all-male staff in the MFH. She recalls one of the orderlies shouting "we don't want any bloody women in this outfit!". However, she soon won them over, and was accepted as part of the team.

She moved with the MFH to Old Sarum Airfield on 5 June 1944, and then Gosport by the 11 June, where they boarded HMS LST 180 (a tank-landing ship), where the problems of accommodating women were solved by the captain of the ship relinquishing his cabin. However, both Molly Giles (a fellow female nurse), and Bower, opted to "stay with the men". When Bower and Molly Giles, arrived at the Juno Beachhead on 12 June 1944, the beachmaster exclaimed "Good God!" Both Giles and Bower were the first women to land with Operation Overlord, several days ahead of others. Bower was "determined to look her best when facing the Germans", and each morning she applied her make-up with shells flying overhead. She had made sure that she had her make-up in a waterproof bag when she arrived at the Juno beachhead.

The unit Bower was working in had sent over 1,000 injured service personnel back to Britain, when, after a few days at the beachhead, No. 50 MFH moved onto Bayeux, where Bower and Giles, were persuaded to put on their best uniforms and pose for some propaganda imagery. It was thought that the public would not like to see them working in horrid conditions of the field hospital. On pushing further into the European theatre of war, Bower said she was "stunned, and felt inadequate" when they arrived at the camp at Bergen-Belsen. She helped evacuate many of the prisoners to hospitals in Belgium, which used flights of Dakota aircraft from an airfield some 4 miles (6.4 km) away from the camp. Bower stayed with No. 50 MFH as it went out across Europe ending in Germany at Celle, Fassberg and finally Schleswig on the Baltic coast, where the unit disbanded and Bower was posted out to RAF Hospital Cosford.

Both Bowers and Giles were awarded the MBE in the 1945 New Years Honours list, for their work in Normandy, and for caring for those they encountered at the Bergen-Belsen camp.

== Personal life ==
In April 1942, Jones married Donald Gordon Ogilvie, an aircrew Royal Air Officer, who had joined the RAF in 1937, and who had served with No. 44 and No. 180 Squadrons. He was shot down over the Netherlands in June 1943, listed as Killed in Action (KIA), after only 15 months of marriage. After the war, she married Major William Hay Bower on 23 April 1949, with whom she had one son, and one daughter. She met her second husband whilst she was posted as a squadron officer (the equivalent of a squadron leader) in Egypt.

In retirement, Bowers lived at Radlett in Hertfordshire. She died on 18 December 2005; her second husband predeceased her in 1977.
