= Alexander Zatonski =

Royal Air Force officer

- Born: 1 November 1915; Philadelphia, Pennsylvania, U.S.
- Died: 6 December 1941 (aged 26) (MIA) disappeared over Cyrenaica, Italian Libya
- Burial place: Unknown
- Military career
- Allegiance: United Kingdom
- Branch: Royal Air Force
- Service years: 1939–1941
- Rank: Flying Officer
- Service number: 43052
- Unit: No. 79 Squadron RAF
- Conflicts: World War II: European air campaign; Battle of Britain; North African campaign; Cyrenaican campaign (MIA)

Flying Officer Alexander Roman Zatonski (1 November 1915 – MIA 6 December 1941) was an American pilot who flew with the Royal Air Force during the Battle of Britain in World War II. He was one of 11 American pilots who flew with RAF Fighter Command between 10 July and 31 October 1940, thereby qualifying for the Battle of Britain clasp to the 1939–45 campaign star. He was posted as missing on 6 December 1941 in north Africa.

== Biography ==
Zatonski was born in Philadelphia on 1 November 1915, the only son of Joseph and Martha Zatonski (who were recent Polish immigrants to America). The family finally settled in Brantford, Ontario in Canada in 1926.

Zatonski was in Britain just prior to the German invasion of Poland. He was trying to travel to Poland to join the Polish Air Force. He subsequently joined the RAF in September 1939.

== Second World War ==
After training with No. 2 Flying Training School, Zatonski joined No. 79 Squadron at RAF Acklington on 13 July 1940 as a Pilot Officer.

He was in combat in early August 1940 and was on operations against the ill-fated attack on the north-east of England by Luftflotte 5 on 15 August 1940. On 28 August 1940, flying from RAF Biggin Hill, he was shot down over Hythe, Kent in his Hurricane P2718, parachuting into the English Channel, badly burned and with a leg injury. He was treated for burns in hospital and then spent time in RAF Hospital Torquay convalescing. Whilst in Torquay he married Mary Bunce. Zatonski rejoined his squadron on 4 December 1940 and flew with it for most of 1941.

In October 1941 he was posted to No. 238 Squadron in North Africa.

=== Disappearance ===
On his second flight on 6 December 1941, Zatonski did not return from an engagement with Messerschmitt Bf 109s of I and II/JG27 over the Cyrenaican border and was reported as missing in action. No trace of his plane or body has ever been located and he is remembered on the Alamein Memorial.

== See also ==
- Eagle Squadrons
- List of people who disappeared mysteriously: 1910-1990
- List of RAF aircrew in the Battle of Britain
- Non-British personnel in the RAF during the Battle of Britain § United States
