= Redcar Primary Care Hospital =

Hospital in North Yorkshire, England

Geography
- Location: West Dyke Road, Redcar, England
- Coordinates: 54.601°N 1.069°W

Organisation
- Care system: NHS
- Network: South Tees Hospitals NHS Foundation Trust

Services
- Beds: 31

History
- Opened: December 2009 (accepting patients); January 2010 (official opening)

Links
- Website: Official website
- Lists: Hospitals in England

Redcar Primary Care Hospital is a 31-bed hospital in the town of Redcar, North Yorkshire, England. It is part of the South Tees Hospitals NHS Foundation Trust.

== History ==
The £37 million site opened in January 2010 (though started accepting patients in December 2009), replacing the Stead Primary Care Hospital which was also in the town of Redcar. An official opening of the 31-bed site was performed in December 2011 by David Jamilly, from the TV programme The Secret Millionaire. Approval for the site was made in 2007 to replace the 28-bed Stead hospital in Kirkleatham. The first minor surgery operation was undertaken in October 2011, and a surgical unit was opened on the site in 2013 to relieve pressure on the sister unit at James Cook Hospital. As part of a drive to improve access to treatment, the Minor Injuries Unit (MIU) at Redcar, was upgraded to an Urgent Treatment Centre (UTC) in October 2019.

An assessment by the Care Quality Commission in 2016 rated the hospital as good overall. (Note: The CQC has a four stage rating *Outstanding *Good *Requires Improvement *Inadequate)

== Facilities ==
The hospital has an Urgent Treatment Centre, and a single ward named Zetland Ward. The outpatients department has several services:

- Diabetic medicine services
- Gastroenterology and haematology services
- Geriatric medicine services
- Long COVID clinics
- Orthopaedics services
- Pain management services
- Parkinson's advanced symptom unit
- Physiotherapy
- Stroke rehabilitation
- Radiology

The site also has a dedicated autism support service and several GP practices.
