= Ronald Wallens =

Ronald Walter Wallens
- Born: 1 February 1916; Amblecote, West Midlands
- Died: 13 November 1995 (aged 79)
- Allegiance: United Kingdom
- Branch: Royal Air Force
- Service years: 1937-1949
- Rank: Squadron Leader
- Commands: No. 277 Squadron RAF
- Conflicts: No. 41 Squadron RAF, No. 277 Squadron RAF
- Awards: Distinguished Flying Cross

Ronald Walter Wallens DFC (1 February 1916 – 13 November 1995) was a British Royal Air Force officer, who flew during the Battle of Britain and as such is one of "The Few".

== Early life ==
Wallens was educated at Worksop College.

== Royal Air Force ==
Wallens joined the Royal Air Force on a short service commission in 1937. He joined his first squadron No. 41 Squadron RAF at RAF Catterick on 26 March 1938. From August to October 1938 he undertook further flying training before rejoining the squadron. He was granted the rank of Pilot Officer in October 1939 and Flying Officer in July 1940.

=== Battle of Britain ===
41 Sqn joined the Battle of Britain in August 1940. On 8 August Wallens claimed 2 Bf 109s destroyed, and one shared destroyed. He shared a Ju 88 on 11 August. On 5 September 1940 Wallens was shot down by a Messerschmitt Bf 109 of JG 54 and seriously wounded in action over the Thames Estuary. Wallens's flight was ordered to make a head-on attack on a large formation of Dornier 17 bombers with 50 plus Bf 109 escorts over Gravesend. Wallens considered the head-on assault "a desperate manoeuvre that could age one very prematurely". Within seconds 'B' Flight's six Spitfires were overwhelmed. Two collided and were lost; another was shot up with the pilot bailing out. Wallens broke away. Seeing two Bf 109's below him he dived and destroyed one. He was lining up the second in his sights when he was attacked from above:

The din was indescribable as the Bf 109's cannon and machine-gun fire tore great chunks out of my wings and blasted the cockpit.

With his leg shattered by a shell, Wallens tried to bail out but his canopy had jammed. He crash-landed four miles from his base at Hornchurch, smashing through a fence and hurdling a ditch before coming to rest in a hayfield. He found that one bullet had removed his helmet's right radio earphone and another the face from his wristwatch.

Wallens had five confirmed kills to his credit before he was shot down.

Wallens was hospitalised until April 1941. During his prolonged convalescence at the RAF Rehabilitation Unit, Torquay, Wallens was much assisted by Dan Maskell, later known as a BBC tennis commentator, who ran the gymnasium. Wallens returned to 41 Squadron in April 1943 but ordered to undertake further convalescence; he was posted on promotion to Flight Lieutenant in July 1943 to No 1 Aircraft Delivery Flight at RAF Hendon, a squadron he went on to command in 1943.

=== Air Sea Rescue ===
Wallens was classified "Unfit for operational flying" in 1943 he was posted to No. 277 Air Sea Rescue Squadron at RAF Hawkinge, Kent. He assumed command of the squadron in 1944. He was awarded the Distinguished Flying Cross in July 1944. The citation read:

In the early phases of the war, Squadron Leader Wallens took part in a large number of sorties during which he destroyed at least 4 enemy aircraft. In combat in September, 1940, he was wounded in the leg by a cannon shell. Since his return to operational duties he has undertaken many air/sea rescue sorties and has been responsible for saving a number of personnel from the sea. He has set a splendid example of gallantry and devotion to duty.

In October 1946, Wallens transferred to the Administrative and Special Duties Branch.

He left the RAF in 1949.

== Post war ==
After the war he worked in the motor trade and ran pubs and hotels.

In 1990, Wallens published his autobiography Flying Made My Arms Ache. It contains an evocative account of the Battle of Britain.

(The day) started off well, but was to end in a terrible shambles. I was petrified but had to grin, six Spitfires against so many 109’s was a bloody tall order... we were literally flying above the backs of the Jerry bombers... I had been petrified earlier but now I was s******* blue lights at the sight of so many swastikas and black crosses... wishing to hell the CO would call it off and come back tomorrow.

Wallens married Violet Bate in 1961 and their daughter Karen was born that year. He died at Banbury, Oxfordshire, in November 1995, at the age of 79.

== Works ==
- Wallens, Ronald (1990). Flying made my arms ache. Self Publishing Association Ltd. ISBN 978-1854210814.
