= Maison Carrée (disambiguation) =

Maison Carrée is an ancient building in Nîmes, southern France.

Maison Carrée may also refer to:

- Maison-Carrée, Algeria, a former name for El Harrach, a suburb of the Algerian capital Algiers
- Maison carrée d'Arlac, a neoclassical folly building constructed between 1785 and 1789, in the town of Mérignac just outside Bordeaux, France
- Battle of Maison Carrée, an 1832 battle between the French Foreign Legion and Algerian natives of the El Ouiffa tribe
