= Cardigan County School =

Grammar school in Cardigan, Wales

Coordinates: 52.085°N 4.660°W

Cardigan County School is the name given to the endowed grammar school in Cardigan which was founded there in the mid seventeenth century (1653). The Intermediate School was opened in the Cardigan Free Grammar School on 4 November 1895, and a new building was opened on 21 September 1898. It seems the school lost its county status in 1949 and was succeeded by the Cardigan Secondary School. Records of the school up to 1949 are held in the Ceredigion Archives in Aberystwyth.

== Notable pupils ==
- Iris Bower (1915–2005), a Royal Air Force nurse
- John Propert (1793–1867), surgeon
