= South Tees Hospitals NHS Foundation Trust =

Hospital trust in North Yorkshire, England

- Type: NHS hospital trust
- Region served: Middlesbrough, Redcar & Cleveland, North Yorkshire and North East region
- Establishments: James Cook University Hospital; Friarage Hospital, Northallerton; Redcar Primary Care Hospital
- Chair: Derek Bell OBE
- Chief executive: Sue Page CBE
- Staff: 10,000
- Website: www.southtees.nhs.uk

South Tees Hospitals NHS Foundation Trust is responsible for the management of the James Cook University Hospital in Middlesbrough, the Friarage Hospital in Northallerton, and community health services across South Tees and parts of North Yorkshire

In July 2019 a merger with North Tees and Hartlepool NHS Foundation Trust was being discussed.

The two Trusts agreed to form a Hospital Group in January 2023.

== Performance ==
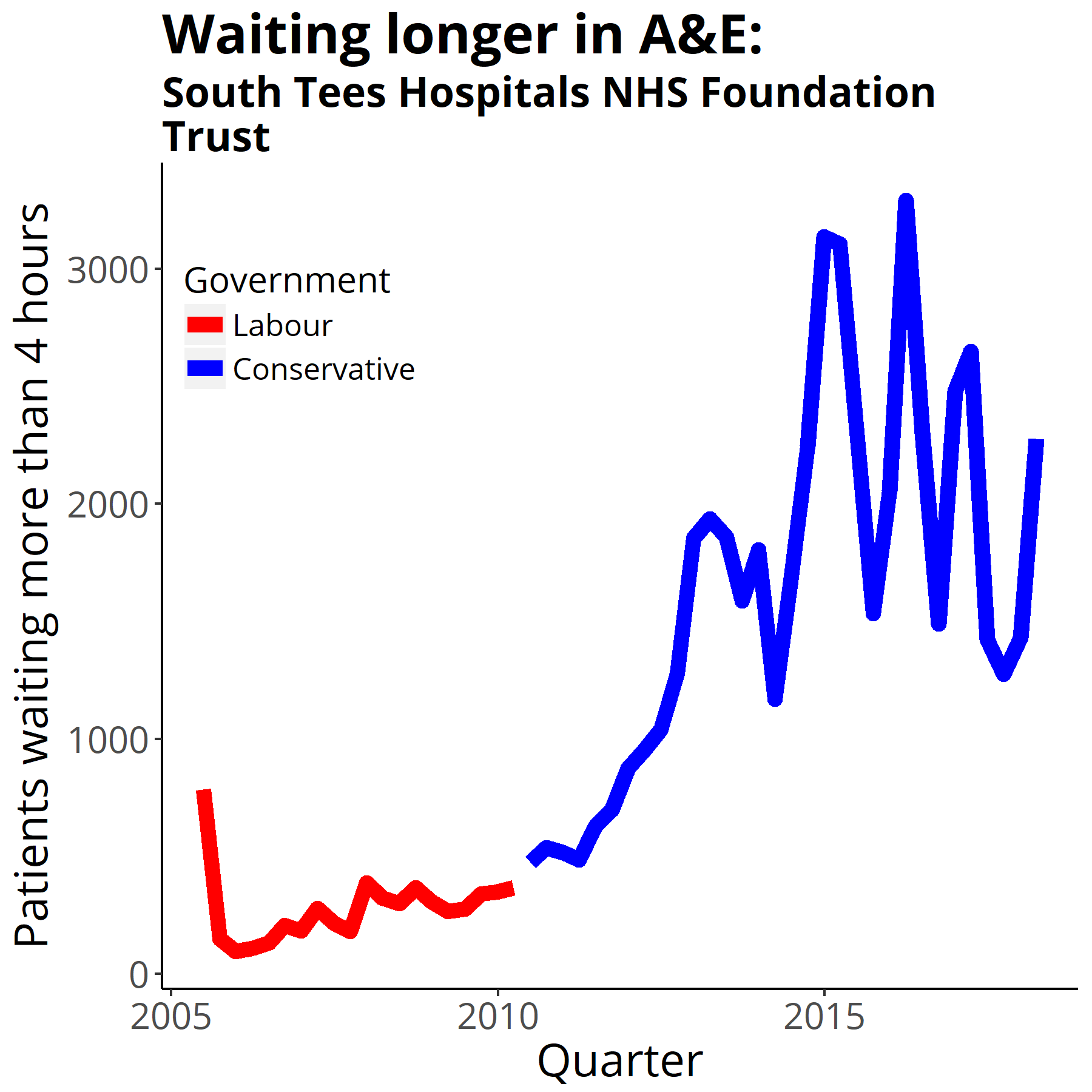
Four-hour target in the emergency department quarterly figures from NHS England Data from https://www.england.nhs.uk/statistics/statistical-work-areas/ae-waiting-times-and-activity/

In May 2023, South Tees Hospitals NHS Foundation Trust became one of the first NHS hospital Trusts in England to achieve a Care Quality Commission ratings increase from 'Requires Improvement' to 'Good' since the start of the COVID-19 pandemic in 2020.

A Care Quality Commission survey found that the Trust was among the best in England for its maternity services in December 2013.

In the 2014 national cancer patient experience survey, the trust had its best-ever results with nine out of ten cancer patients rating their care at The James Cook University Hospital and Friarage Hospital as "very good" or "excellent" with some departments achieving 100% patient satisfaction in a number of areas. After being ranked one of the most highly rated trusts in England by patients, the trust has now been selected to mentor University Hospitals Bristol NHS Foundation Trust as part of a volunteer "buddy" scheme to help them improve their patients' experience of care.

It was named by the Health Service Journal as one of the top hundred NHS trusts to work for in 2015. At that time, it had 7,840 full-time equivalent staff and a sickness absence rate of 4.45%. 70% of staff recommend it as a place for treatment and 52% recommended it as a place to work.

== Facilities ==
The James Cook University Hospital in Middlesbrough provides is a major regional centre with more than 37 different specialties on one site. The majority of these specialist services deliver care to patients and service users across Teesside, North Yorkshire and the wider region.

The Friarage Hospital in Northallerton is a nationally recognised Surgical Hub and serves communities across the Dales, North Yorkshire and Teesside.

The Trust's primary care hospital wards and local community NHS teams, serve patients across Middlesbrough, Redcar & Cleveland, Hambleton and Richmondshire.

== See also ==
- List of NHS trusts
