= Gordon Turnbull =

Psychiatrist

Gordon Turnbull is a British psychiatrist and expert on post traumatic stress disorder. He is the lead trauma consultant at the Nightingale Hospital in London, visiting professor at the University of Chester, and Consultant Advisor in Psychiatry to the Civil Aviation Authority.

Turnbull is the author of the book Trauma: From Lockerbie to 7/7; How trauma affects our minds and how we fight back, published by Bantam Press in 2011.

== Education ==
Turnbull grew up in Leith, Edinburgh, where he attended Lorne Street School and then George Heriot's School, before enrolling to study medicine at Edinburgh University in 1967. He graduated in 1973 and subsequently joined the Royal Air Force.

== Prominent cases ==
In 1988, Turnbull led the team to debrief personnel involved in the Lockerbie Air Disaster, on behalf of RAF Mountain Rescue teams.

In August 1991, Turnbull was involved in debriefing journalist John McCarthy, hostage negotiator Terry Waite and pilot Jackie Mann at RAF Princess Alexandra Hospital in Wiltshire on their return from Beirut, Lebanon, where they had been held hostage.

== Recognition ==
- People of the Year Award, Royal Association for Disability and Rehabilitation, 1993
