= RAF Hospital Northallerton =

Former RAF Hospital in North Yorkshire, England

- Royal Air Force
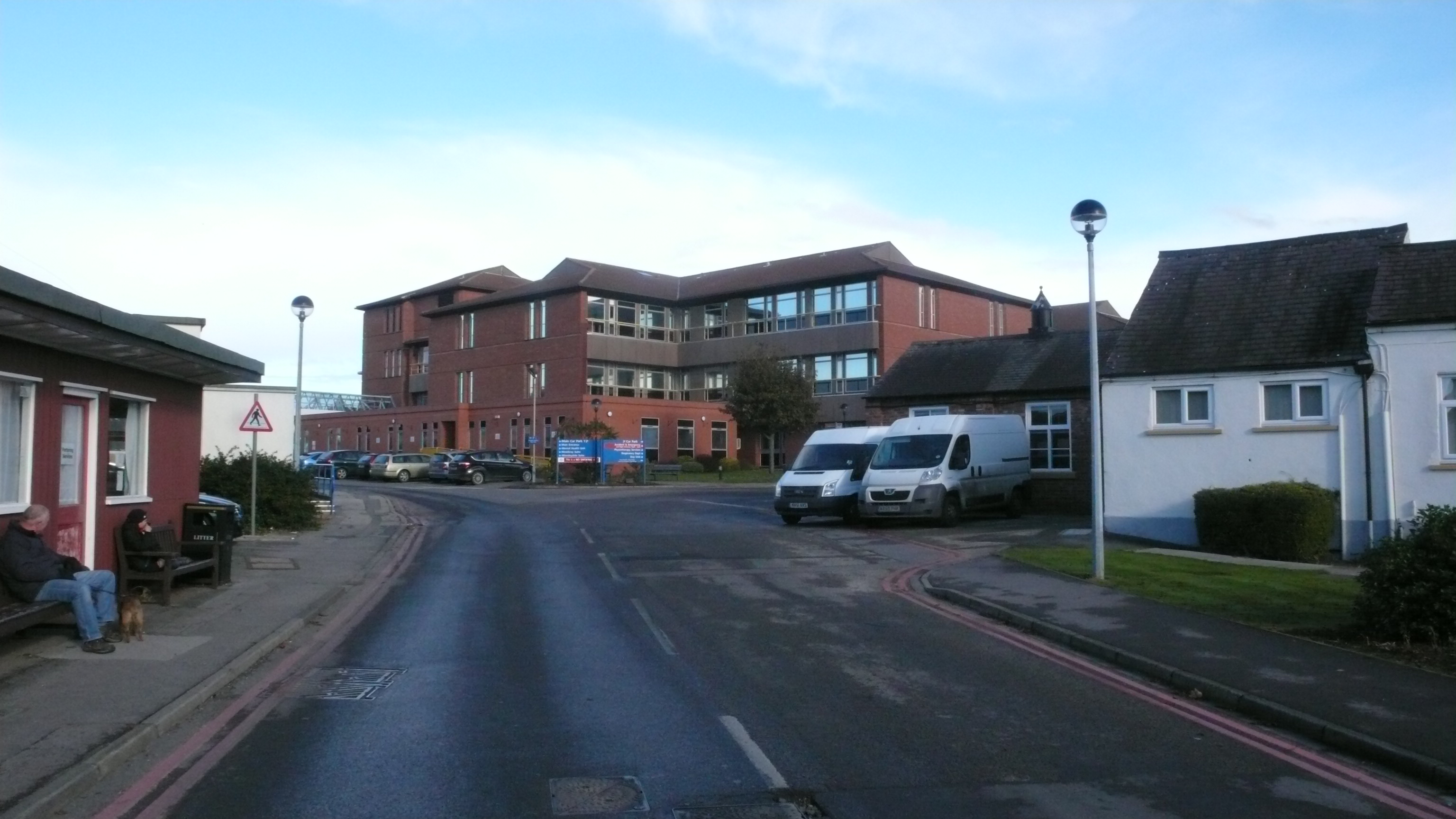
- Friarage Hospital site

Geography
- Location: Northallerton, North Riding of Yorkshire, England
- Coordinates: 54.342°N 1.429°W

Organisation
- Care system: Military
- Funding: Government hospital

Services
- Beds: 450 (July 1944)

History
- Construction started: 1938
- Opened: January 1943
- Closed: November 1947

Links
- Lists: Hospitals in England

RAF Hospital Northallerton, was a Second World War era military hospital, in Northallerton, Yorkshire, England. The Friarage Hospital now stands where the former hospital once stood.

The site was a once a temporary medical care centre, set up in 1938 in case of bombing casualties in the area, including Middlesbrough and Stockton-on-Tees. The Royal Air Force (RAF) took over the hospital in 1943 and relinquished it in 1947. The hospital catered specifically for RAF and Royal Canadian Air Force (RCAF) personnel.

== History ==
The hospital was sited on the old Northallerton Workhouse next to Sun Beck. Before that, the site had been occupied by a Carmelite friary, from where the modern day hospital would derive its name (The Friarage).

In the late 1930s, eight wooden huts were assembled on the site. These were prepared for casualties of expected bombing runs over areas near ports and industry on the River Tees, though initially, the hospital housed wounded service personnel from the Dunkirk evacuation.

The hospital site was turned over to the Royal Air Force in January 1943, (Note: A Ministry of Health report from 1945 states the hospital was commandeered on 31 December 1942.) with a remit for healthcare for those injured during air operations from the many airfields of No. 6 Group which were scattered around North Yorkshire. (Note: No. 6 Group operated from RAF stations at Croft, Dalton, Dishforth, East Moor, Leeming, Linton-on-Ouse, Middleton St George, Skipton-on-Swale, Tholthorpe, Topcliffe, Wombleton. Non-aircrew military personnel were also treated at Northallerton.) Previous to this, air force casualties were sent to the Army hospital at Catterick, or other RAF hospitals, but no Royal Air Force medical facility existed in the north-eastern area, which prompted the takeover of the facilities in Northallerton.

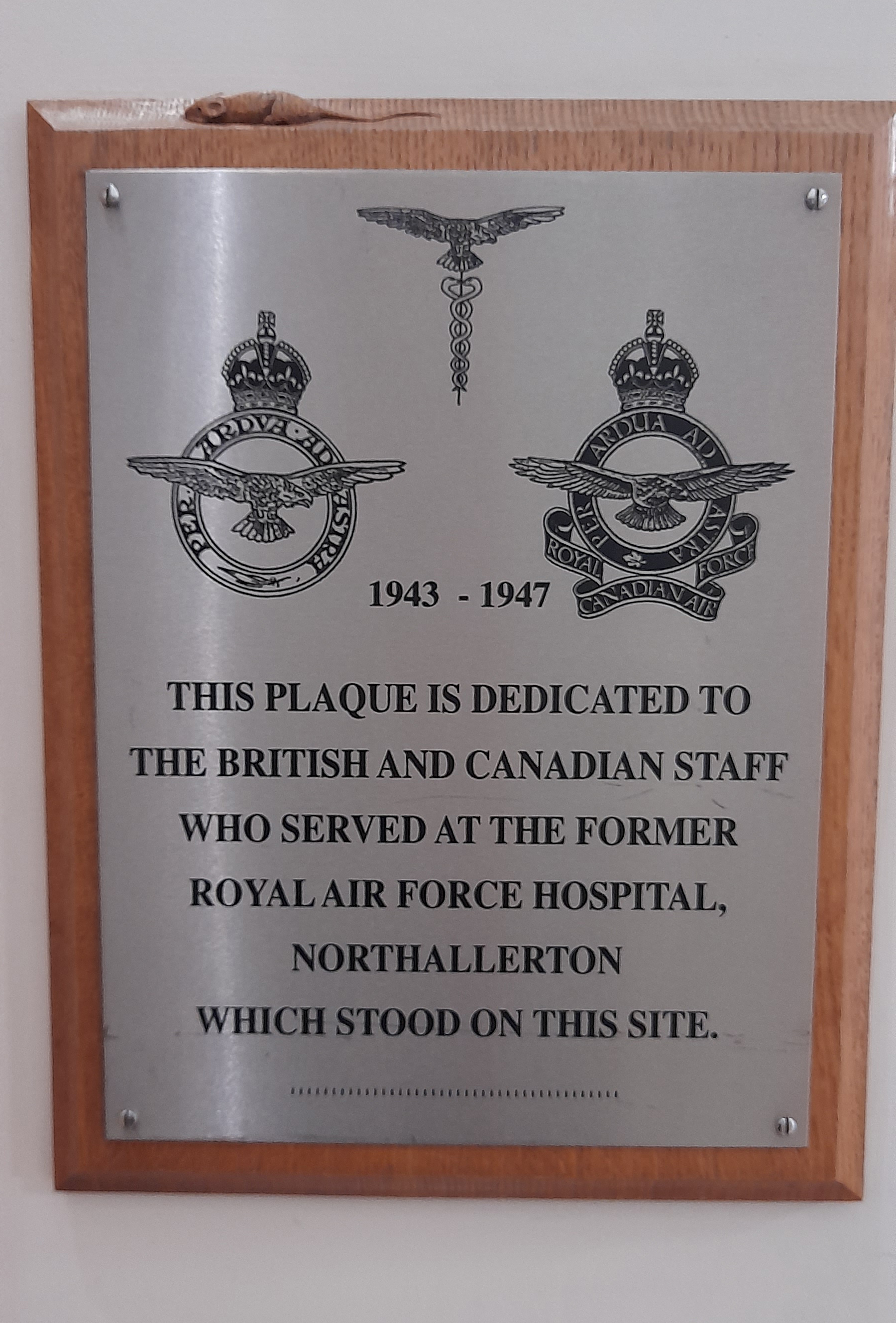
Plaque at Friarage Hospital celebrating RAF Hospital Northallerton

The hospital needed some work before it could be transferred from civilian to service control. New ambulance bays needed to be constructed and more accommodation blocks were required to house 200 staff, besides the initial 200 beds for injured personnel. An acute shortage of fresh water was a problem as the hospital developed beyond the means of its intended size. At one point in 1943, baths were limited to one-a-week for males and two-a-week for females, but only in 5 inches (130 mm) of water. Eventually a new pipeline was laid from nearby Kirby Sigston in October 1943. One of the squadron leaders who worked at the hospital, developed a Mobile Surgical Unit (MSU). This was an ambulance (a Humber Utility Van), with an anaesthetist, a surgeon, a resuscitation officer, a theatre sister and an operating room assistant. The MSU made at least 25 operational runs to aircraft crashes across North Yorkshire, and the timely efforts saved many lives. The MSU also performed surgery at various airfield station sick quarters when it was considered inadvisable to move the patient to the hospital. As the hospital catered largely for personnel from No. 6 Group, (which consisted of 15 RCAF squadrons), it also had a complement of RCAF nursing staff of four medical officers and ten nurses. (Note: Nicholson suggests that in 1944, this breakdown was three medical officers, one matron, and six nurses.)

At the outbreak of the Second World War, the Royal Canadian Air Force did not possess a medical branch of its own, with that function being undertaken by the Royal Canadian Army Medical Corps. In 1940, a training regime was implemented and by 1943, the RCAF medical branch had nurses at Warrington, Bournemouth, East Grinstead and Northallerton. The large number of RCAF squadrons allocated to bases in North Yorkshire (15 squadrons in all), meant that injured RCAF personnel being admitted to the RAF Hospital in Northallerton, numbered 155 in one month alone in 1944. Serious consideration was given by the Canadian military to the hospital becoming a solely Canadian affair, but the plan was eventually dropped, especially given the resistance by the then director of RAF Medical Services (Harold Whittingham), who did not want medical services divided.

By July 1944, 450 beds were available, but emergency protocols existed to push this number to 525 if necessary. By 1945, the hospital had 390 beds and was being recommended for return to civilian use. In the last year of the war, ENSA members (Robert Donat, Bernard Miles) visited the hospital to entertain the patients, and the hospital chapel was formally opened. Between the peace of 1945, and November 1947, the hospital took on successive convoys of invalided patients and casualties returning from the theatre of war. RAF Hospital Northallerton had at least 44 'convoys' and dealt with 856 returning soldiers, sailors and airmen.

In November 1947, the hospital was returned to civilian use, and in 1948, was renamed the Friarage, in honour of the friary that had once existed on the site. Many of the wooden huts at the hospital, which were constructed from Canadian Oregon and Cedar Pine, remained on site until 1999, when they were finally demolished. With the downgrading of the Duchess of Kent Military Hospital at Catterick Garrison, service personnel returned to the Friarage site as part of the MHDU (Ministry of Defence Hospital Unit).

== Commanding officers ==
- Group Captain W A S Duck (1943–1946)
- Air Commodore James Kilpatrick (1946–1947)
