= RAF Hospital Torquay =

Former military hospital in Torquay, England

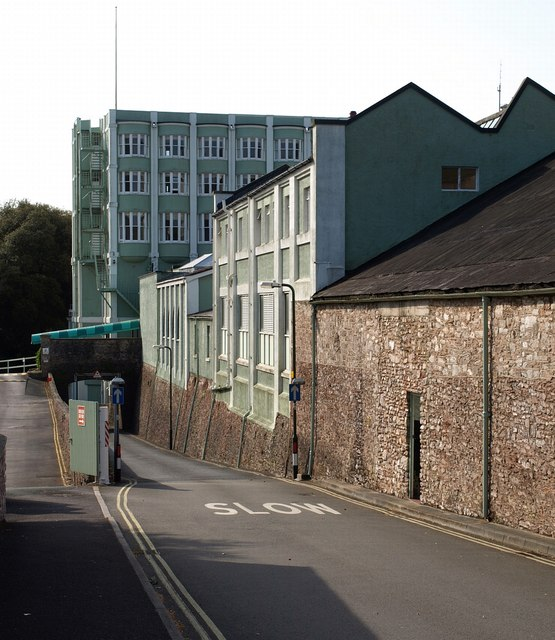
- Palace Hotel, Torquay; used as an RAF hospital

Geography
- Location: Babbacombe, Torquay, Devon, England
- Coordinates: 50.472°N 3.505°W

Organisation
- Care system: Military

Services
- Beds: 249 (1939)

History
- Opened: October 1939
- Closed: January 1943
- Demolished: 2020

Links
- Lists: Hospitals in England

The RAF Hospital Torquay (also known as the RAF Officer's Convalescent Hospital), was a medical facility run by the Royal Air Force (RAF) in the Torquay suburb of Babbacombe, Devon, England, during the Second World War. The RAF requisitioned the Palace Hotel, and set about converting it into a hospital, which opened in 1939. The hospital was subjected to at least two bombing raids in October 1942 and January 1943. The first raid resulted in at least 21 deaths, with the function of the hospital ceasing immediately and all work being transferred to other RAF Hospitals. It was never used as a hospital again, and after the war, was returned to civilian use.

== History ==
The Palace Hotel in Babbacombe was chosen as an RAF Officers' Hospital due to its scenic location, easy access from the rail network, and the state of the local roads, which were deemed to be in a good enough condition for motorised ambulance transport. Another factor in its location was the belief that it was safe from aerial bombardment. The Officer's Hospital had previously been located at RAF Uxbridge, but this was moved to the "relative safety" of Torquay. Besides having the hospital, Babbacombe was the location of No. 1 ITW (Initial Training Wing), later No. 1 Receiving Wing, that was a basic training school for RAF recruits. The hospital was opened in October 1939, with a complement of 249 beds, and a staff of 203 (11 officers, 87 nurses, 87 airmen, and the rest were civilian employees). Patients occupied the single rooms in the hotel, however, four rooms on the second floor needed adapting to make a suitable theatre, which was running by May 1940, when the hospital had 105 in-patients. In February 1940, it was stated that the hospital was equipped with 240 beds, and a complement of 200 staff; doctors nurses, dentists, administrative personnel, and at least 80 civilian staff who had worked at the hotel prior to it being commandeered for the war effort.

The hospital was known for its convalescent status, and also for its work in psychotherapy. Battle-weary and fatigued personnel were assessed at the hospital under a new programme that had evolved since the First World War when those who had broken down were deemed to be suffering from shell shock. The RAF hospital at Torquay, and another unit, were described as "groundbreaking" in their treatment of mentally ill service personnel. The necessity for rehabilitation was realised in 1940 when there was a shortage of experienced aircrew, and at Torquay, special attention was paid to physio and occupational therapy. Methods were looked at with a view to keeping the patients within the hospital, such as dances, a small bar and a hospital newsletter/magazine called the Torquay Tatler. It was thought that the "bright lights of Torquay" might lead to a lapse in the officers' recovery.

=== 1942 bombing ===
At 11:00 am on 25 October 1942, despite having a large red cross painted on the roof, the hospital was attacked by four Focke-Wulf 190s, in what was described as a "Tip and Run" raid. A Tip and Run raid was where bombers would attack and strafe at low level, and then quickly return to their home airfields. The hospital suffered a direct hit on the east wing, and a second bomb exploded on the road adjacent, severely damaging the west wing. Fourteen RAF Officers and five staff were killed, and outside, two members of the Home Guard were fatally injured. Forty of those inside the hospital were injured, ten of them staff, the others were patients. At the time, the hospital had 203 patients, and many of the injured and local Home Guard helped to dig the survivors from the rubble. Only basic first aid could be carried out, as all theatres and examination rooms had been destroyed.

Many patients were taken to other RAF hospitals by road or train in the days following the bombing. A new convalescent hospital was opened at Cleveleys near Blackpool, and the functions of Torquay were implemented there by May 1943.

The building was placed on a "care and maintenance" programme, but was attacked again in January 1943, though this time without casualties. After the 1943 bombing, the building was abandoned, and was not re-opened as a hotel until 1948. In 2020, the building was demolished to make way for a new hotel development.

== Notable personnel ==
- Peter Ayerst, patient in 1941 after a car crash.
- Iris Bower, nurse at the hospital
- William Dunn, patient in 1941. Dunn was an Eagle Squadron pilot.
- Jan Falkowski, patient in 1941
- Keith Lawrence, patient in 1941
- Dan Maskell, served at the hospital as a rehabilitation officer
- James Brindley Nicolson, patient in 1941
- Henry Osmond-Clarke, group captain orthopaedic surgeon at the hospital
- Freddie Sowrey, when the hospital was bombed, he had to be dug out of the rubble.
- Ronald Wallens, patient in 1941
- Alexander Zatonski, spent time at Torquay convalescing after being shot down
