= RAF Hospital Uxbridge =

Former Royal Air Force hospital in London, England

RAF Hospital Uxbridge
- Near Uxbridge, Greater London in England

Site information
- Type: Royal Air Force Hospital
- Owner: Ministry of Defence
- Operator: Royal Air Force

Location
- Shown within Greater London
- Coordinates: 51°32′45″N 000°28′17″W

Site history
- Built: 1925
- In use: 1925-2010

RAF Hospital Uxbridge was a military hospital within the Royal Air Force station RAF Uxbridge.

== History ==
Douglas Bader arrived at the hospital in 1932 to recover after the amputation of both of his legs following a flying accident. It was during his stay that he met the Desoutter brothers who were pioneering the use of lightweight aluminium for the production of prosthetic limbs. Bader was fitted with the new style of legs and returned to active service with the RAF, to become known as "the legless pilot".

In early 1940, the officers' hospital on the station became the Women's Auxiliary Air Force Hospital, with the Officers' hospital moving to the RAF Hospital Torquay.
