= RAF Hospital Cosford =

Former RAF Hospital in, Shropshire, England

RAF Cosford Hospital
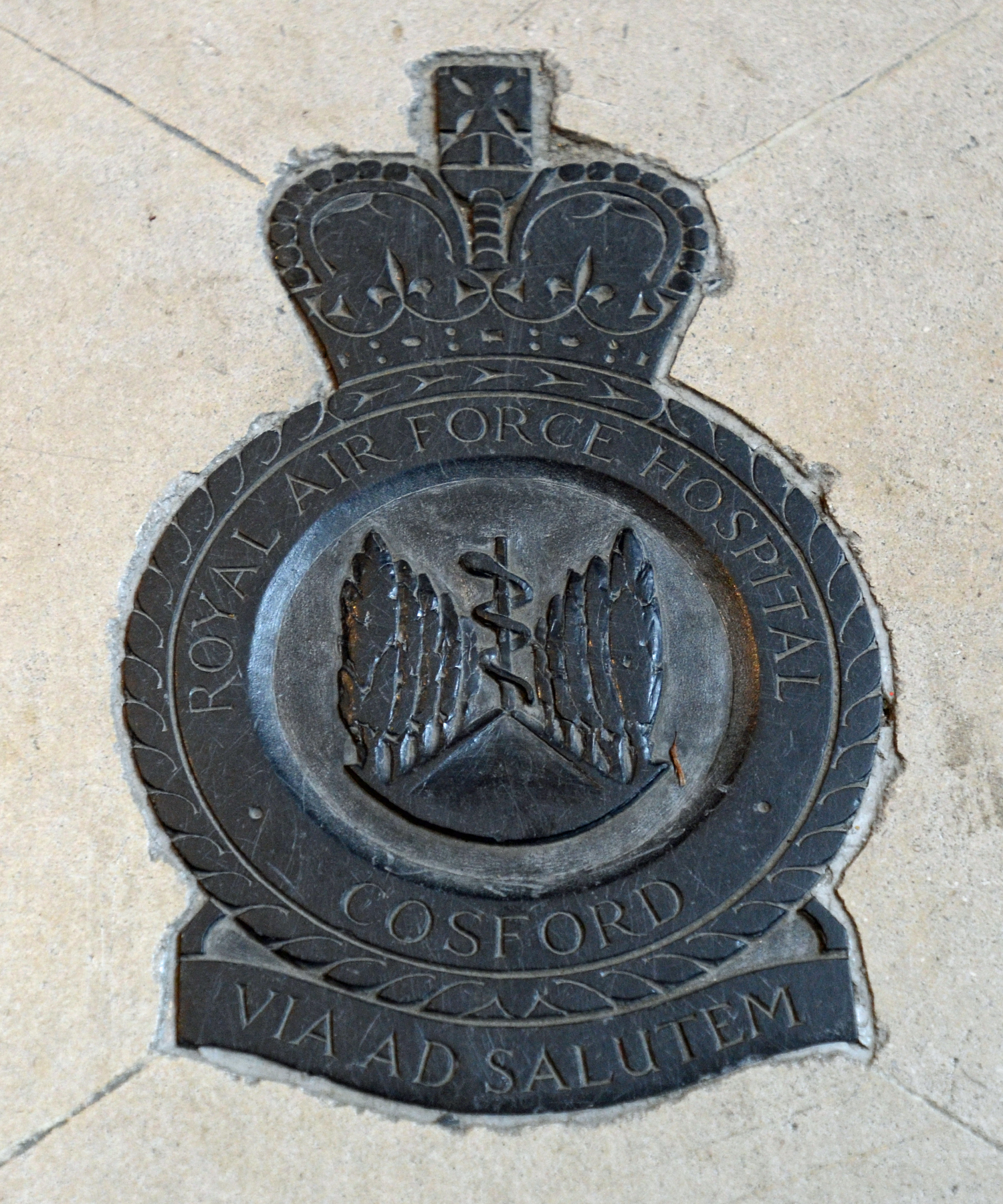
- Cosford Hospital badge set into the floor of the church at St Clement's Dane

Geography
- Location: RAF Cosford, Shropshire, England
- Coordinates: 52.651°N 2.289°W

Organisation
- Care system: Military

Services
- Beds: 612 (1941)

History
- Opened: 1940
- Closed: 31 December 1977
- Demolished: 1980

Links
- Lists: Hospitals in England

RAF Hospital Cosford was a Royal Air Force staffed military hospital at RAF Cosford, Shropshire, England. The hospital opened in 1940, and was one of a handful of Second World War era RAF hospitals that were kept open post Second World War, remaining a military asset until 1977, although it also treated non-service patients. It was known for its personnel reception centre (No. 106 PRC), which dealt with returning prisoners of war in 1945.

== History ==
The hospital was built on the north eastern part of RAF Cosford, separated from the main technical site by the A41. Originally, the station sick quarters, consisting of several wards, were built as a series of huts on the north western corner of Fulton Block on the main site. However, the regional hospital was developed from 1939 onwards on the eastern site of RAF Cosford. When this newer hospital was opened in 1940, with a complement of eight medical officers, the hutted hospital buildings next to Fulton Block were combined into an infectious diseases hospital. In 1941, a burns unit was added to the main hospital, which by the end of the war, had treated 42,000 patients. The specialised unit had 13 beds, equipped to deal with burns victims, and two dedicated saline baths for treatment.

During the Second World War, Cosford became one of the specialist dental units, supplying treatment and training for dental officers. Between 1943 and 1945, a total of 1,128 dental patients were treated ranging from impacted wisdom teeth and cysts, to fractured jaws. Apart from in the depths of winter, extra facilities were pressed into action on the concreted areas outside of the main hospital, with temporary lighting and heating provided. These areas were used for those who were "offensive-smelling long term cases".

The requirement for the number of beds reflected the hospital's role in either wartime or its service support. It should also be noted that Cosford Hospital was open to non-service personnel in the local community after 1948, and the dependents of serving personnel.

=== No. 106 Personnel Reception Centre ===
No. 106 Personnel Reception Centre (No. 106 PRC) operated from the hospital between 7 March and August 1945. It was a component of No. 24 Technical (training) Command, and would utilise the nearby airfields of RAF Seighford and RAF Wheaton Aston to ferry former PoWs into the PRC. The PRC was set up to process returning Air Force Prisoners of War (PoW) from the European and Far East Theatres. The necessity for the PRC was reflected in the numbers of PoWs returning from Europe in April and May 1945, which numbered into the tens of thousands. Among the many famous faces that went through No. 106 PRC, was Douglas Bader, who flew into Cosford on his own, and apologised for arriving in the middle of the night.

It was realised that most of the returning PoWs would be drawn from the officer cadre, and space at Cosford was made available by transferring technical training for airmen back to RAF Halton in Buckinghamshire. Due to the volume of returning PoWs, extra flights were laid on to other RAF stations; Dunsfold, Ford, Hixon, Oakley, Odiham, Seighford, Westcott and Wing, and all Royal Air Force personnel would be taken to Cosford. Some were posted straight into the hospital, whereas others could be posted onto No. 4 Medical Rehabilitation Centre, which was also located at Cosford, and saw some patients being assessed in a commandeered section of Fulton Block. An estimation of numbers determined that space at Cosford would allow 3,600 patients at Cosford, with an overspill at RAF Hednesford. It was planned that up to 600 cases a day could be dealt with, but on at least three occasions, over 900 PoWs were assessed within one day. All told, 11,003 returning British PoWs were assessed at Cosford between March and August 1945.

=== Post war history ===
On the formation of the NHS in 1948, civilian patients were allowed to use most of the RAF Hospitals up and down the United Kingdom. Among the RAF Hospitals, only St Athan had a midwifery department in 1948, but by 1950, Cosford had opened its midwifery and maternity unit. In the 1960s, the hospital at Cosford was used to conduct research into hypertension.

The hospital was announced for closure in early 1977, and was closed on 31 December 1977. In its final years, funding for the hospital was allocated solely from NHS accounts, and as such, it was treated as an NHS hospital. The last matron recalled seven RAF staff stood "..in the drizzling rain as the flag[sic] was hauled down for the last time." The main hospital buildings were demolished in 1980.

== Badge ==
The Badge was authorised by the Queen in 1963, and carried the motto of Via ad salutem (Latin: The road to health).

== Notable people ==
- John Ainsworth-Davis (1895–1976), sprint runner, gold medallist in the 4 × 400 m relay at the 1920 Summer Olympics, head of surgical unit in World War II
- Iris Bower (1915–2005), had attended patients at the Bergen-Belsen concentration camp, became a nurse at the hospital
- Air Vice-Marshal John Cooke (1922–2011), medical officer who commanded the medical division at the hospital in the 1950s
- Rosaline Few (born 1955), athlete, competed at the 1972 Summer Olympics, she was treated at the hospital in 1977 for suspected appendicitis after taking part in the high jump at an athletics event at RAF Cosford
- Suzi Perry (born 1970), a British television presenter, was born at the hospital and later brought up in Finchfield
