= RAF Wroughton =

UK Royal Air Force airbase

RAF Wroughton
- Wroughton, Wiltshire in England
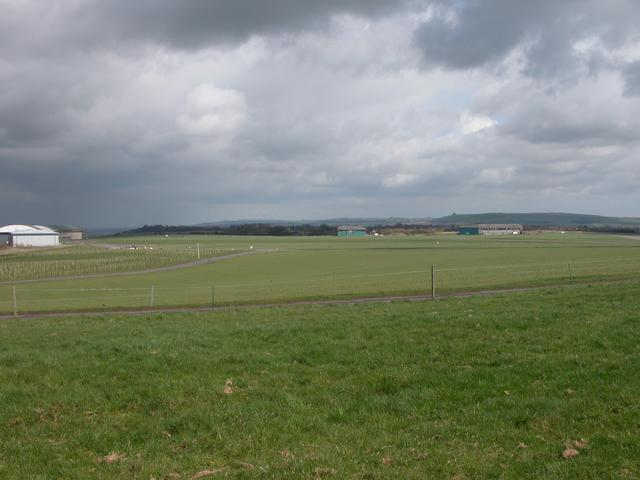

Site information
- Owner: Ministry of Defence
- Operator: Royal Navy; Royal Air Force
- Controlled by: Directorate of Naval Recruiting; RAF Maintenance Command
- Open to the public: no

Location
- Shown within Wiltshire
- Coordinates: 51.507°N 1.802°W

Site history
- Built: 1 April 1940
- In use: 1940-1979

Airfield information
Runways
Direction	Length and surface
04/22	1,430 metres (4,692 ft) Asphalt
09/27	1,050 metres (3,445 ft) Asphalt
15/33	1,110 metres (3,642 ft) Asphalt

RAF Wroughton is a former Royal Air Force station near Wroughton, in Wiltshire, England, about 4 miles (6 km) south of Swindon. Ministry of Defence aviation activity ceased in 1972. The airfield now belongs to the Science Museum Group and is home to the National Collections Centre, which houses the group's large-object storage and library.

== Early history ==
The site was acquired for an airfield in 1937 and the airfield opened on 1 April 1940. It was used for the assembly and storage of aircraft during the Second World War.

The following units were here at some point:

- No. 15 Maintenance Unit RAF
- No. 41 Group Test Pilots Pool
- No. 76 Maintenance Unit RAF
- No. 88 Gliding School RAF
- Maintenance Command Jet Training Flight

Control of RAF Wroughton was handed over to the Royal Navy and it became the Royal Naval Aircraft Yard Wroughton in 1972.

== RAF Princess Alexandra Hospital ==
RAF Hospital Wroughton was part of the station and stood near the eastern boundary of the site, about 1 1/2 miles (2.4 km) west of Chiseldon. The RAF General Hospital (as it was known) opened on 14 June 1941 and by the end of March 1944 its bed capacity was 1,000. Wroughton continued as a General Hospital treating military patients, and from 1958 took NHS cases as well to relieve backlogs in the Swindon area.

Following a visit to the hospital by Princess Alexandra on 4 July 1967, the Queen conferred the prefix "Princess Alexandra's" on the hospital on 4 October 1967. The hospital was the primary destination for returning casualties of the Falklands War in 1982. When hostages from Beirut were released in August 1991, Wg Cdr Gordon Turnbull, a psychiatrist based at Wroughton, with his team, debriefed John McCarthy, Terry Waite and Jackie Mann and provided the counselling necessary to ease them back into freedom.

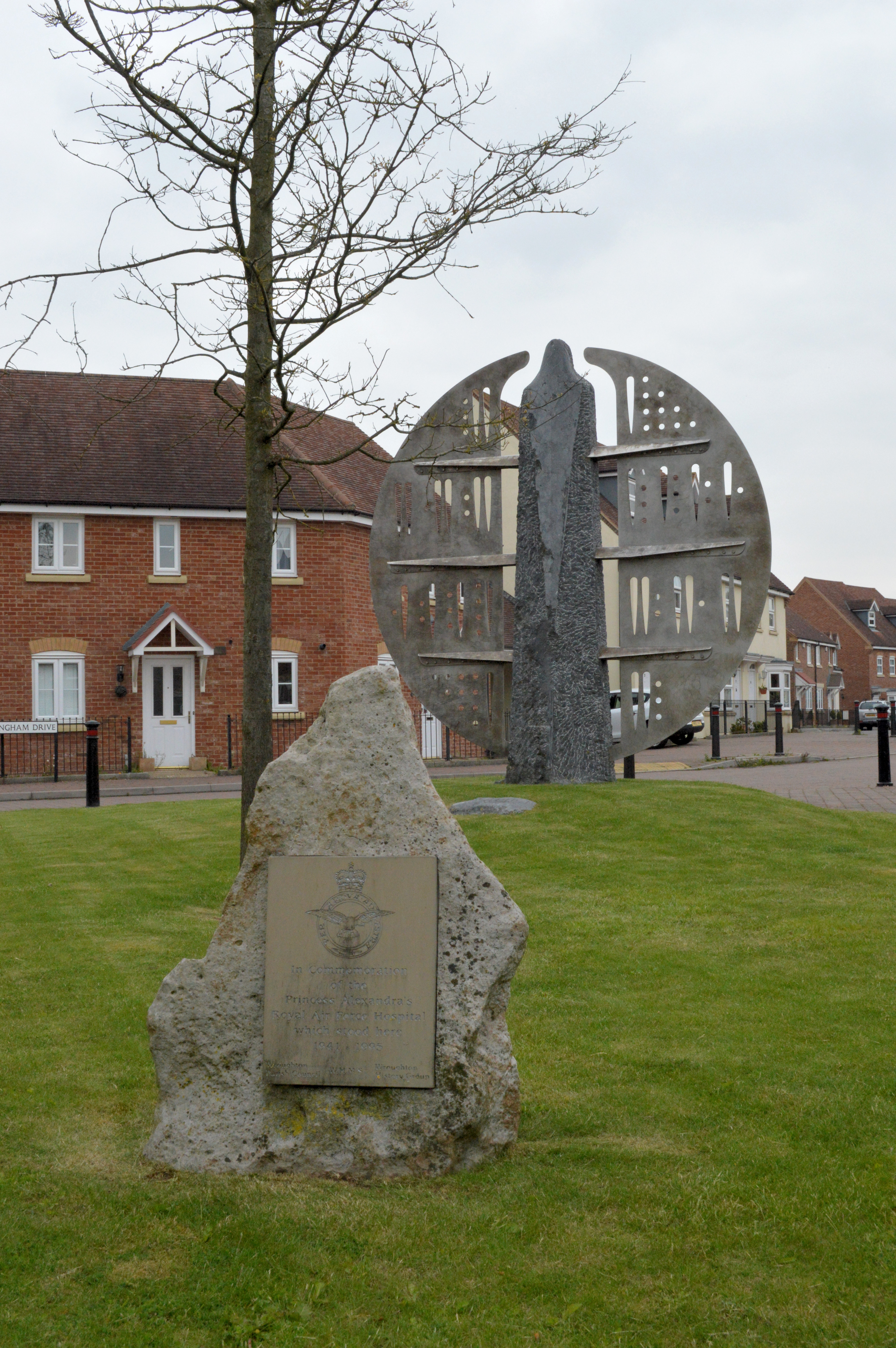
Hospital memorial

The hospital closed on 31 March 1996 as part of the Conservative Government's defence cuts at the end of the Cold War. The hospital was demolished in 2004 and the site, called Alexandra Park, used for housing and a conference centre; a memorial commemorates the former hospital. Street names in the development reflect the site's history, including Normandy and Falklands Roads named after battles, and Whittingham Drive named after RAF physician Harold Whittingham.

== Science Museum at Wroughton ==
The large-object storage of the Science Museum has been at Wroughton since 1979.

== Current use ==
In 2016 a 50 MW solar farm was completed on about 67 hectares of the airfield, with over 150,000 solar panels. This was a joint project of Public Power Solutions (a commercial arm of Swindon Borough Council) and the Science Museum Group.

From 2016 to 2019, the television series The Grand Tour operated their test track on the north end of the airfield, with the track encircling part of the Science Museum's storage facilities.

In 2010, Defence Estates stated that the Ministry of Defence still owned some 4.22 hectares of the site, where two linked hangar-type buildings were used by the Directorate of Naval Recruiting.

== See also ==
- List of former Royal Air Force stations
