= Twinings Museum =

Tea museum in Westminster, London, England

Coordinates: 51.5133°N 0.1129°W

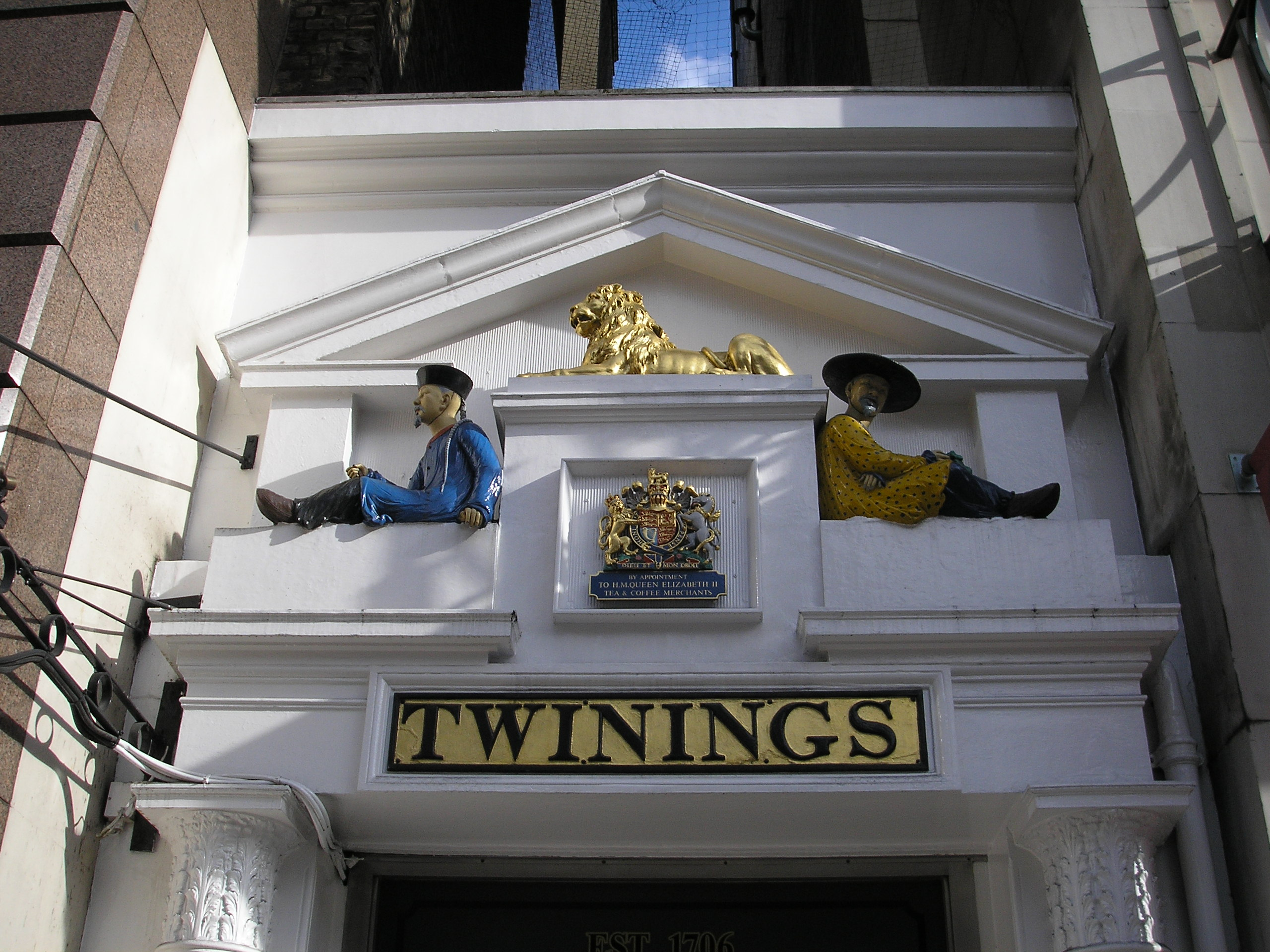
Twinings shop on Strand

The Twinings Museum is a small museum adjacent to the Twinings shop at 216 Strand, in London, England, detailing the history of the Twinings tea company.

== History ==
Thomas Twining (1675–1741) moved with his family from Gloucester to London in 1684, when he was nine years old. After serving an apprenticeship as a weaver in the City of London, Twining worked for the East India Company merchant Thomas D'Aeth, and became a tea merchant.

Twining purchased Tom's Coffee Shop, in Devereux Court, off the Strand, in 1706. He subsequently used the premises to sell tea to customers, in addition to the more common coffee, and to sell dry tea to both customers and other nearby coffee shops, such as the Grecian Coffee House – now the site of The Devereux public house. Tea was then an expensive luxury product. Twining's business was quickly successful, which enabled Twining to expand into adjacent premises on the Strand.

By 1717, Twining was trading at 216 Strand, at the sign of the Golden Lyon, where the business remains. The classical door case is surmounted by a pediment with a statue of a golden lion, and two figures of Chinese men who signify the origin of the beverage. The museum is adjacent to the shop, in the historic premises at 216 Strand.

The Twinings tea business is now owned by Associated British Foods.

== Exhibits ==
The Twinings Museum contains historical artifacts and documents associated with the history of the Twinings company. The museum also displays vintage tea caddies, examples of Twinings packaging, advertisements, and other tea memorabilia and ephemera. In addition to this, the museum explains the history of the Twinings family.

Twinings received a royal warrant from Queen Victoria in 1837. The museum displays a copy of the royal warrant for providing Twinings to British royalty.

== See also ==
- List of food and beverage museums
