= Michael Howard (Luciferian) =

Michael Howard

Michael Howard (1948–2015) was an English practitioner of Luciferian witchcraft and a prolific author on esoteric topics. From 1976 until his death he was the editor of The Cauldron magazine.

Born in London, Howard developed an interest in supernatural subjects through fiction literature, later exploring Tibetan Buddhism after a near death experience. He proceeded to study at an agricultural college in Somerset, learning about the local folklore from an elderly farm worker, in particular folk beliefs about magic and witchcraft. He advanced his knowledge of esoteric subjects through reading books by prominent occult authors like Aleister Crowley and Helena Blavatsky, and in 1964 joined the fledgling Witchcraft Research Association, becoming particularly interested in the articles in its newsletter that were authored by the witch Robert Cochrane. Returning to the London area, in 1967 he developed a friendship with the Luciferian ceremonial magician Madeline Montalban, joining her Order of the Morning Star. In 1969 he was initiated into Gardnerian Wicca, joining a coven of its practitioners, and in the early 1970s became a member of Christine Hartley's Co-Masonic lodge in West London.

In 1975, Howard published his first book, Candle Magic, which was followed the next year by the beginning of The Cauldron. From 1977, the magazine became the vehicle for Bill Liddell's controversial articles about the nineteenth century cunning man George Pickingill, and it would also serve as a platform for articles by a wide range of esotericists. In 1999, Howard was contacted by Andrew Chumbley, and in 1999 he joined Chumbley's "traditional witchcraft" order, the Cultus Sabbati.

The Pagan studies scholar Ethan Doyle White described Howard as a "prominent figure in the British Craft movement", while Hutton characterised him as "the most open-minded of Pagan editors".

== Biography ==
=== Early life ===
Howard was born in London in 1948. In his early teenage years, he developed an interest in Western esotericism, occultism, and the paranormal, primarily through the fictional stories of writers like Dennis Wheatley, M. R. James, Algernon Blackwood, C. S. Lewis, H. Rider Haggard, Edgar Rice Burroughs, Sax Rohmer, Arthur Machen, Robert E. Howard, and H. P. Lovecraft. Aged fourteen, he underwent an emergency operation and an associated near death experience, subsequently embarking on a study of spirituality, in particular through books on Tibetan Buddhism by authors like Lobsang Rampa. He was intrigued by the prospect of magical practices continuing in Britain after reading a March 1963 article in the Daily Sketch detailing a "Black Magic Rite" alleged to have taken place near to the village of Clophill in Bedfordshire. Shortly after, he watched a television interview with the prominent Wiccan Gerald Gardner, whose arguments against a hostile Christian clergyman impressed Howard.

He went on to study at an agricultural college in Somerset, as part of which he was assigned to a work placement on a smallholding between Wincanton and Castle Cary which was run by two elderly spinster sisters. An elderly man who sometimes worked on the farm recounted to Howard various aspects of local folklore, including a belief in witchcraft. The old man informed him that the spinsters nailed rowan twigs above the doors to their barn and cowshed on May Eve and Halloween in order to ward off fairies and "black witches", also telling him that there were solitary female "witches" living on the border between Devon and Somerset who used magic to either curse or cure ailments.

Following his graduation, Howard gained employment on a farm in Gloucestershire, and on his day off each week he travelled to Gloucester or Cheltenham. In the latter was a second-hand bookstore where he purchased a number of books on esoteric subjects, including John Symonds' biography of the occultist Aleister Crowley, The Great Beast, Crowley's own Magick in Theory and Practice, Robert Graves' The White Goddess, Dion Fortune's The Sea Priestess and Moon Magic, Margaret Murray's The Witch-Cult in Western Europe, Montague Summers' Witchcraft and Black Magic, James Frazer's The Golden Bough, and Helena Blavatsky's The Secret Doctrine and Isis Unveiled. It was also while working for this farm that he met a local cunning man, who also worked as a hedge layer and fence-repairer. This man taught Howard more about folk magic, and hinted that there were groups of folk magicians active in the Cotswolds who were involved in a tradition that was separate from Gardner's Wicca. After a short time in Gloucestershire, Howard moved to Middlesex to be closer to his mother, who was terminally ill. Here he was employed as a gardener at Stanmore, although he later left this position in order to become an office worker. In coming years he would work in various managerial and executive positions for EMI, Sotheby's, and Her Majesty's Customs and Excise.

=== The Order of the Morning Star and Wicca ===
In 1964 he joined the short-lived Witchcraft Research Association, and through reading its newsletter, Pentagram, he discovered the writings of the Witch Robert Cochrane. Although Howard claimed that he was "never totally convinced" of Cochrane's claim to have come from a hereditary tradition of witches stretching back generations, he added that Cochrane's writings "had a lasting influence on my progress through the Craft". Searching for an occult organisation in which to involve himself, he visited the headquarters of the Society of the Inner Light in Hampstead, although being nineteen at the time he was deemed too young to join.

In 1967, Howard wrote to the Luciferian ceremonial magician and astrologer Madeline Montalban after reading one of her articles in Prediction magazine; she invited him to visit her at her home. The two became friends, with Montalban believing that she could see the "Mark of Cain" in his aura. She invited him to become a student of the ONS, which he duly did. Although his parents disapproved of his interest in magic, over the coming year he spent much of his time with her, and in 1968 they went on what she called a "magical mystery tour" to the West Country, visiting Stonehenge, Boscastle and Tintagel.

In 1969, he was initiated into Gardnerian Wicca, something Montalban disapproved of, and their friendship subsequently "hit a stormy period" with the pair going "[their] own ways for several years." Howard's Gardnerian initiator had also been involved in The Regency, a group founded by members of Cochrane's Clan of Tubal Cain after Cochrane's death in 1966. The Wiccan group that Howard was part of merged the Gardnerian structure with additional elements borrowed from ceremonial magic, the Regency, and Cochrane's practices. This coven corresponded with an American, Jessie Bell, and initiated her into the tradition by proxy, sending her a copy of their own variant of the Gardnerian Book of Shadows. Claiming that the Goddess had commanded her to do so, she published the work as Lady Sheba's Book of Shadows, much to the coven's disapproval.

During the 1970s he befriended Christine Hartley, a longstanding member of the Society of the Inner Light, and he accompanied her to Mass performed by the Liberal Catholic Church. At her invitation, he joined her Co-Masonic lodge in West London, which had an Ancient Egypt theme. He also enquired about joining the West London-based Ancient Order of the Pyramid and the Sphinx, a ceremonial magic group which was run by Tamara Bourkon, but declined membership when it was revealed that he would have to adopt vegetarianism, celibacy, and teetotalism.

=== Publications and The Cauldron ===
At Montalban's recommendation, Howard began writing on esoteric subjects, with his first publication being an article on elementals which appeared in Prediction in 1971. He continued to write articles and book reviews for the magazine for thiry years, until his friend, Jo Logan, retired as its editor. In 1975 his first book, Candle Burning: Its Occult Significance, was published by Thorsons. The publisher had initially proposed a book on this subject to W. G. "Ernest" Butler, a friend of Hartley's, but he did not feel capable of the task, instead suggesting Howard's name to them.

"The original, if in retrospect rather naive, premise behind [The Cauldron] was based on the ideals of the old Witchcraft Research Association. My idea was to bring together different individuals, covens and traditions in an independent literary forum to promote informed discussion and tolerance. Obviously that was a rather optimistic goal, but over thirty years later the magazine is still growing strong while many others have fallen by the wayside. So we must be doing something right!"

— Michael Howard, 2010.

In 1974, he and a female friend had established an esoteric magazine titled Spectrum. It ran for ten issues before folding after his co-editor found the project too difficult due to pre-existing work commitments. In 1976 Howard then established The Cauldron, a magazine catering for modern Pagan Witches, after the idea was suggested to him in a conversation with the Gardnerian Madge Worthington. After The Wiccan, it was only the second British outlet to do so, and gave space to practitioners of traditions other than the Gardnerian Wicca which dominated The Wiccan. 100 copies of the first issue were produced on a second-hand roneo duplicator which Howard had purchased from the redundancy payment given to him by EMI. 25 copies were placed in the Atlantis Bookshop while the rest were sent to Spectrum subscribers to complete their outstanding subscriptions. Over the coming forty years, The Cauldron published articles by a range of individuals associated with the study or practice of magic, including Ronald Hutton, Caroline Tully, Philip Heselton, Geraldine Beskin, Sorita d'Este, Rae Beth, Gareth Knight, Evan John Jones, and Nigel Pennick.

In 1977 Howard was contacted by E. W. Liddell, who was then publishing controversial articles on the Essex cunning man George Pickingill in The Wiccan. Liddell ceased writing for The Wiccan and began producing articles for The Cauldron instead. Howard also published a number of articles on the subject of Luciferianism within The Cauldron, using the pseudonym of 'Frater Ashtan'. Many of these were published in a collected form as The Pillars of Tubal Cain, brought out by Capall Bann in 2000.

In 1992, Howard was contacted by Andrew Chumbley, who sent him a copy of his work, Azoetia: A Grimoire of the Sabbatic Craft, to review for The Cauldron. This resulted in a correspondence that lasted for several years before Howard met with Chumbley and his wife. Chumbley invited Howard to join his occult order, the Cultus Sabbati, with Howard doing so in 1999. Howard moved to Wales, where he lived for two decades. A Jacobite, he was a member of the Royal Stuart Society. In 2015, he died of complications surrounding renal failure while in Devon, surrounded by friends and family. The news was announced by Xoanon and on The Cauldron website, while it was also announced that the magazine itself would be discontinued.

== Luciferianism ==
The religious studies scholar Fredrik Gregorius believed that Howard's work "blurred" the boundary between Luciferianism and Wicca. Many of these books had been published by Capall Bann, a small esoteric publishing company primarily associated with Pagan topics.
