= Assembly of Light Bearers =

Luciferian organization

Logo of the Assembly of Light Bearers

The Assembly of Light Bearers (ALB), formerly known as the Greater Church of Lucifer (GCoL), is a Luciferian organization founded by Michael W. Ford in 2013. According to sociologist Massimo Introvigne, on October 30, 2015, Ford inaugurated "the first Satanist temple open to the public which was located in the Old Town Spring suburb of Houston, Texas". Media coverage of the temple's planned opening inspired imitators in other countries to follow suit.

== Background ==
Black metal musician Michael W. Ford was the leader of the Indianapolis chapter of the Order of Nine Angles from 1996 to 1998. After breaking with the ONA due to its pro-Nazi ideology, he formed the Order of Phosphorus, followed by the Church of Adversarial Light in 2007.

In 2013, Ford established the Greater Church of Lucifer. He led the group with his wife, Hope Marie Ford. Two years later, he announced on Facebook that the GCoL had grown to include multiple chapters in the United States, one in Canada, and several across Spain and Central and South America. He also explained that the Order of Phosophorus would be folded in to GCoL.

According to the Christian Broadcasting Network, founders of the GCoL included "Jacob No", later revealed to be Jacob McKelvy, who eventually converted to Christianity. McKelvy said that he had started the church in his garage, that he hadn't expected it to "become as big as it was".

=== Philosophy ===
In 2015, the GCoL published the Wisdom of Eôsphorus, an official statement of its philosophy, based on social Darwinism and Satanism in the tradition of Anton LaVey.

At the same time, Michael and Hope Marie Ford have described their religion as "Luciferian witchcraft". Luciferian witchcraft generally ties Wicca and Satanism together, by casting Lucifer as the god of the witches. Michael Ford himself published a book titled Luciferian Witchcraft in 2005.

Sociologist Massimo Introvigne has suggested that GCoL emphasized LaVeyan Satanism to its outer circle and to the media, while focusing more on the occult with former members of the Order of Phosphorus and others interested in ritual magic.

== House of worship ==
On October 30, 2015, Ford inaugurated the first Satanist temple open to the public on Main Street in Old Town Spring, Texas, as GCoL co-president. The GCoL website stated, "The Greater Church of Lucifer is only a 'church' as a play on words".

The grand opening of the building was planned as an opportunity for members to meet in person for the first time; until that point, the organization had mainly existed online. Local news reports estimated the number of attendees at the temple's first "gathering" was between 20 to "a few dozen". The Luciferians told the media they expected a total of 40 members to attend during its opening weekend, 15 of whom had traveled in from as far as New York and Maine.

=== Protest and vandalism ===
Over a hundred people protested the opening of the Greater Church of Lucifer, including both Catholic and Protestant Christians. Protesters waved signs, shouted, prayed, and engaged in debate with Luciferians. A Christian cross was "flicked" onto the porch of a neighboring shop. Some of the protesters were from out of state.

The GCoL building itself had two major incidents of vandalism: its front windows were smashed by a couple wielding the statue of a cherub, and its roof was damaged in the middle of the night after someone sawed off the branch of a 200-year-old pecan tree hanging over the church. The GCoL sign was also dented.

=== Further developments ===
On June 13, 2016, the GCoL board of directors including the Fords and Jeremy Crow, announced the resignation of Jacob McKelvy due to mismanagement of funds. The board stated that it was taking steps to ensure that similar problems did not occur in the future. McKelvy later told the Christian Broadcasting Network that he had become disenchanted with the organization's "quest for power".

In August 2016, the Greater Church of Lucifer was forced to shut down its premises, because their landlord refused to renew their lease after receiving death threats. As of 2017, the group had changed its name to the Assembly of Light Bearers.

== Impact ==
News about the Greater Church of Lucifer opening in Texas led to imitators to follow suit internationally. These included the Association Temple Seeds of Light (Asociación Templo Semillas de Luz), established by Víctor Damián Rozo (also known as Héctor Londoño Villegas) in Calarcá, Colombia, on June 6, 2016.
