= Madeline Montalban =

English occultist (1910–1982)

- Montalban in the 1970s; this image was published in the magazine Man, Myth and Magic.
- Born: Madeline Sylvia Royals; 8 January 1910; Blackpool, Lancashire, England
- Died: 11 January 1982 (aged 72); London, England
- Occupations: Astrologer; ceremonial magician
- Spouses: George Edward North; Nicholas Heron
- Children: 1

Madeline Montalban (born Madeline Sylvia Royals; 8 January 1910 – 11 January 1982) was an English astrologer and ceremonial magician. She co-founded the esoteric organisation known as the Order of the Morning Star (OMS), through which she propagated her own form of Luciferianism.

Born in Blackpool, Lancashire, Montalban moved to London in the early 1930s, immersing herself in the city's esoteric subculture, and influenced by Hermeticism she taught herself ceremonial magic. She associated with significant occultists, including Thelemites like Aleister Crowley and Kenneth Grant, and Wiccans like Gerald Gardner and Alex Sanders. From 1933 to 1953 she published articles on astrology and other esoteric topics in the magazine London Life, and from then until her death in the nationally syndicated magazine Prediction. These were accompanied by several booklets on astrology, released using a variety of different pseudonyms, including Dolores North, Madeline Alvarez and Nina del Luna.

In 1952 she met Nicholas Heron, with whom she entered into a relationship. After moving to Southsea in Hampshire, they founded the OMS as a correspondence course in 1956, teaching subscribers their own magical rites. Viewing Lucifer as a benevolent angelic deity, she believed Luciferianism had its origins in ancient Babylon, and encouraged her followers to contact angelic beings associated with the planetary bodies to aid their spiritual development. After her relationship with Heron ended in 1964, she returned to London, continuing to propagate the OMS. She settled in the St. Giles district, where she became known to the press as "The Witch of St. Giles". She died of lung cancer in 1982.

Having refused to publish her ideas in books, Montalban became largely forgotten following her death, although the OMS continued under new leadership. Her life and work was mentioned in various occult texts and historical studies of esotericism during subsequent decades; a short biography by Julia Philips was published by the Atlantis Bookshop in 2012.

== Biography ==
=== Early life: 1910–1938 ===
Madeline Sylvia Royals was born on 8 January 1910 in Blackpool, Lancashire. Little is known of her early life, which coincided with Britain's involvement in the First World War, although she appears to have had a strained relationship with her parents. Her father, Wilbie Royals, was an master baker they both were propriators of Royals Bakery servicing most of Blackpool's hotel industry, while her mother, Marion Neruda Shaw, was a tailor's daughter from Oldham. Wilbie and Marion had married on 28 June 1909, followed by Madeline's birth seven months later. In early life, Madeline was afflicted with polio, resulting in a lifelong withered leg and limp. Bedridden for the course of the illness, she read literature to entertain herself, enjoying the works of Edward Bulwer-Lytton, H. Rider Haggard and E. T. A. Hoffmann. She also read the Bible in her youth, becoming particularly enamored with the texts of the Old Testament, and was convinced that they contained secret messages, a theme that became a central tenet of her later Luciferian beliefs.

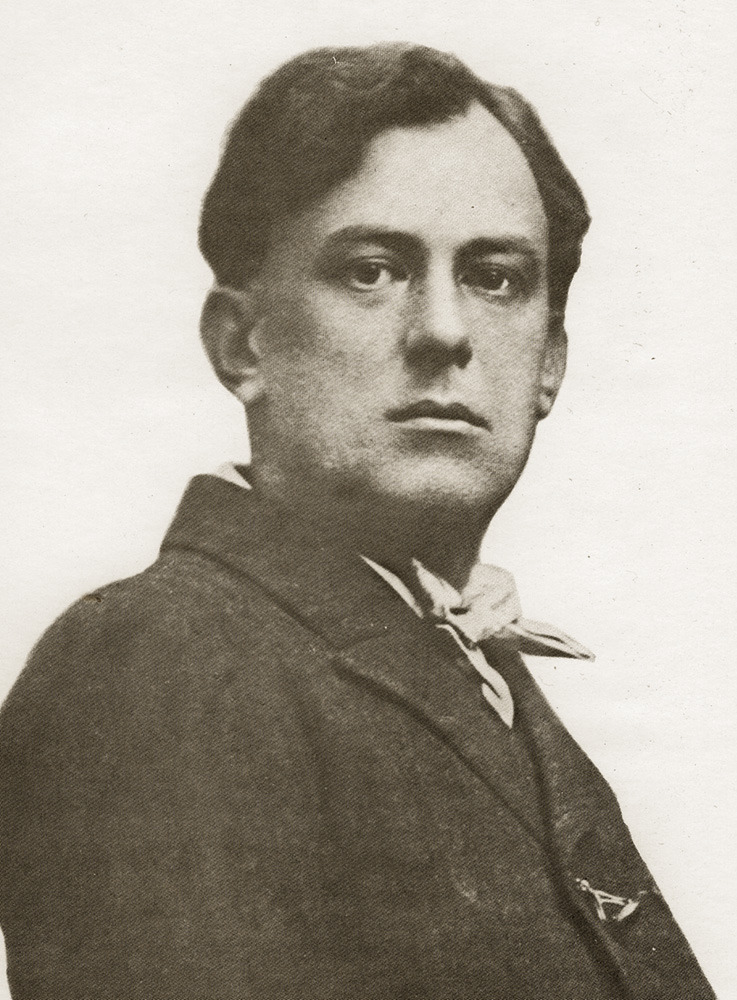
Crowley, whom Montalban met in London

In the early 1930s, she left Blackpool, and moved south to London. Her reasons for doing so have never been satisfactorily explained, and she would offer multiple, contradictory accounts of her reasoning in later life. According to one account, her father sent her to study with the famed occultist and mystic Aleister Crowley, who had founded the religion of Thelema in 1904; Montalban's biographer Julia Philips noted that while she met Crowley in London, this story remains implausible. Another of Montalban's accounts held that she moved to the capital to work for the Daily Express newspaper; this claim has never been corroborated, and one of the paper's reporters at the time, Justine Glass, has claimed that she never remembered Montalban working there. Montalban often changed her stories, and informed later disciple Michael Howard that upon arrival in London, the Daily Express sent her to interview Crowley. According to this story, when she first visited him at his lodgings in Jermyn Street, he was suffering from an asthma attack, and having had experience with this ailment from a family member she was able to help him, earning his gratitude. They subsequently went to the expensive Café Royal in Regent Street, where after their lunch, he revealed that he was unable to pay, leaving Montalban to sort out payment.

Although her own accounts of the initial meeting are unreliable, Montalban met with Crowley, embracing the city's occult scene. Having a deep interest in western esotericism, she read widely on the subject, and taught herself the practice of magic rather than seeking out the instruction of a teacher. She was particularly interested in astrology, and in 1933 wrote her first article on the subject for the magazine London Life, entitled "The Stars in the Heavens". Her work continued to see publication in that magazine until 1953, during which time she used different pseudonyms: Madeline Alvarez, Dolores del Castro, Michael Royals, Regina Norcliff, Athene Deluce, Nina de Luna, and the best known, Madeline Montalban, which she created based upon the name of a film star whom she liked, the Mexican actor Ricardo Montalbán.

=== Marriage and London Life: 1939–1951 ===
By the end of the 1930s, Montalban was living on Grays Inn Road in the Borough of Holborn. In 1939, she married fireman George Edward North in London. They had a daughter, Rosanna, but their relationship deteriorated and he left her for another woman. She later informed friends that during the Second World War, George had served in the Royal Navy while she served in the Women's Royal Naval Service (WRNS), although such claims have never been corroborated. Gerald Gardner, founder of Gardnerian Wicca – known for his unreliable stories – claimed that he met Montalban during the war, when she was wearing a WRNS uniform, and that at the time she was working as a "personal clairvoyant and psychic advisor" to Lord Louis Mountbatten. Various individuals who knew her would comment that she had in her possession a framed blurry picture of Mountbatten with an individual who looked like her.

She continued her publication of articles under an array of pseudonyms in London Life, and from February 1947 was responsible for a regular astrological column entitled "You and Your Stars" under the name of Nina del Luna. She also undertook other work, and in the late 1940s, Michael Houghton, proprietor of Bloomsbury's esoteric-themed Atlantis Bookshop, asked her to edit a manuscript of Gardner's novel High Magic's Aid, which was set in the Late Middle Ages and which featured practitioners of a Witch-Cult; Gardner later alleged that the book contained allusions to the ritual practices of the New Forest coven of Pagan Witches who had initiated him into their ranks in 1939. Gardner incorrectly believed that Montalban "claimed to be a Witch; but got everything [sic] wrong" although he credited her with having "a lively imagination." Although initially seeming favourable to Gardner, by the mid-1960s she had become hostile towards him and his Gardnerian tradition, considering him to be "a 'dirty old man' and sexual pervert." She also expressed hostility to another prominent Pagan Witch of the period, Charles Cardell, although in the 1960s became friends with the two Witches at the forefront of the Alexandrian Wiccan tradition, Alex Sanders and his wife, Maxine Sanders, who adopted some of her Luciferian angelic practices. She personally despised being referred to as a "witch", and was particularly angry when the esoteric magazine Man, Myth and Magic referred to her as "The Witch of St. Giles", an area of Central London which she would later inhabit.

In his 1977 book Nightside of Eden, the Thelemite Kenneth Grant, then leader of the Typhonian OTO, told a story in which he claimed that both he and Gardner performed rituals in the St. Giles flat of a "Mrs. South", probably a reference to Montalban, who often used the pseudonym of "Mrs North". The truthfulness of Grant's claims have been scrutinised by both Doreen Valiente and Julia Philips, who have pointed out multiple incorrect assertions with his account.

=== Prediction and The Order of the Morning Star: 1952–1964 ===
From August 1953, Montalban ceased working for London Life, publishing her work in the magazine Prediction, one of the country's best-selling esoteric-themed publications. Starting with a series on the uses of the tarot, in May 1960 she was employed to produce a regular astrological column for Prediction. Supplementing such esoteric endeavours, she penned a series of romantic short stories for publication in magazines. Throughout the 1950s she released a series of booklets under different pseudonyms that were devoted to astrology; in one case, she published the same booklet under two separate titles and names, as Madeline Montalban's Your Stars and Love and Madeline Alvarez's Love and the Stars. She never wrote any books, instead preferring the shorter booklets and articles as mediums through which to propagate her views, and was critical of those books that taught the reader how to perform their own horoscopes, believing that they put professional astrologers out of business.

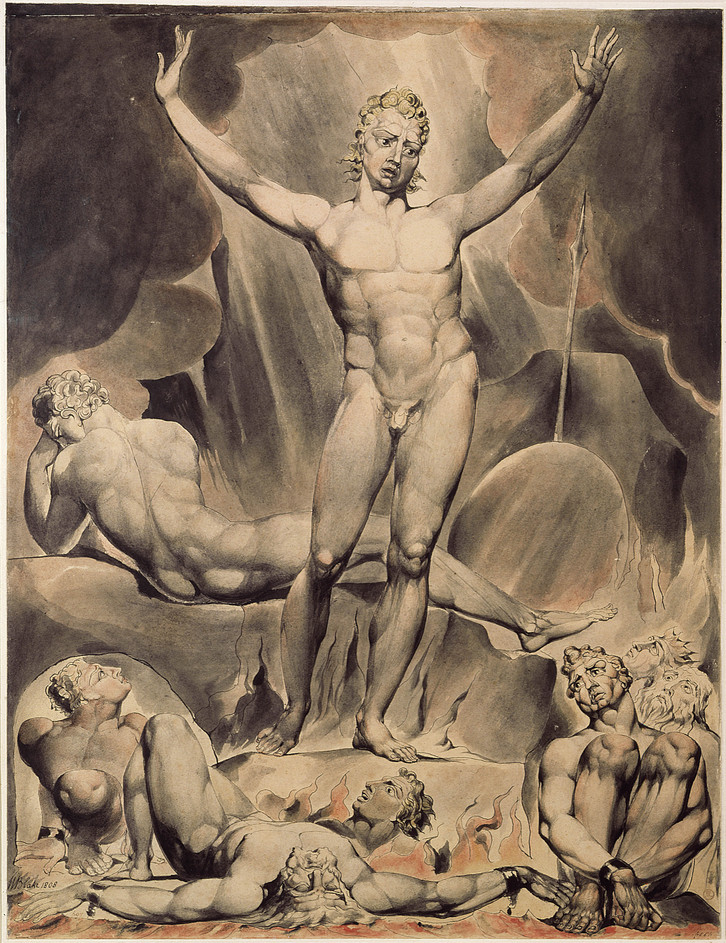
Montalban considered Lucifer – depicted here by William Blake – to be a benevolent deity who had aided humanity since ancient times.

In 1952 she met Nicholas Heron, with whom she entered into a relationship. An engraver, photographer and former journalist for the Brighton Argus, he shared her interest in the occult, and together they developed a magical system based upon Luciferianism, the veneration of the deity Lucifer, or Lumiel, whom they considered to be a benevolent angelic deity. In 1956, they founded the Order of the Morning Star, or Ordo Stella Matutina (OSM), propagating it through a correspondence course. The couple sent out lessons to those who paid the necessary fees over a series of weeks, eventually leading to the twelfth lesson, which contained The Book of Lumiel, a short work written by Montalban that documented her understanding of Lumiel, or Lucifer, and his involvement with humankind. The couple initially lived together in Torrington Place, London, from where they ran the course, but in 1961 moved to the coastal town of Southsea in Essex, where there was greater room for Heron's engraving equipment.

She encouraged members of her OMS course to come and meet with her, and developed friendships with a number of them, blurring the distinction between teacher and pupil. Meetings of OMS members were informal, and rarely for ritual, with the majority of the organisation's rites requiring solitary work. According to later members of her Order, Montalban's basis was in Hermeticism, although she was heavily influenced by Mediaeval and Early Modern grimoires like the Picatrix, Corpus Hermeticum, The Heptameron of Pietro d'Abano, The Key of Solomon, The Book of Abramelin, and Cornelius Agrippa's Three Books of Occult Philosophy. Unlike the founders of several older ceremonial magic organisations, such as the Hermetic Order of the Golden Dawn or the Fraternity of the Inner Light, she did not claim any authority from higher spiritual beings such as the Ascended masters or Secret Chiefs. She believed that the Luciferian religion had its origin among the Chaldean people of ancient Babylon in the Middle East, and believed that in a former life, the OMS's members had been "initiates of the Babylonian and Ancient Egyptian priesthood" from where they had originally known each other. She considered herself the reincarnation of King Richard III, and was a member of the Richard III Society; on one occasion, she visited the site of Richard's death at the Battle of Bosworth with fellow OMS members, wearing a suit of armour. In March 1964, Montalban broke from her relationship with Heron, and moved back to London.

=== Later life: 1964–1982 ===
From 1964 until 1966 she dwelt in a flat at 8 Holly Hill, Hampstead, which was owned by the husband of one of her OMS students, the Latvian exile and poet Velta Snikere. After leaving Holly Hill, Montalban moved to a flat in the Queen Alexandra Mansions at 3 Grape Street in the St. Giles district of Holborn. Here, she was in close proximity to the two primary bookstores then catering to occult interests, Atlantis Bookshop and Watkins Bookshop, as well as to the British Museum. She offered one of the rooms in her flat to a young astrologer and musician, Rick Hayward, whom she had met in the summer of 1967; he joined the OMS, and in the last few months of Montalban's life authored her astrological forecasts for Prediction. After her death, he continued publishing astrological prophecies in Prediction and Prediction Annual until summer 2012.

In 1967, Michael Howard, a young man interested in witchcraft and the occult wrote to Montalban after reading one of her articles in Prediction; she invited him to visit her at her home. The two became friends, with Montalban believing that she could see the "Mark of Cain" in his aura. She invited him to become a student of the ONS, which he duly did. Over the coming year, he spent much of his time with her, and in 1968 they went on what she called a "magical mystery tour" to the West Country, visiting Stonehenge, Boscastle and Tintagel. In 1969, he was initiated into Gardnerian Wicca, something she disapproved of, and their friendship subsequently "hit a stormy period" with the pair going "[their] own ways for several years."

A lifelong smoker, Montalban developed lung cancer, causing her death on 11 January 1982. The role of sorting out her financial affairs fell to her friend, Pat Arthy, who discovered that despite her emphasis on the magical attainment of material wealth, she owned no property and that her estate was worth less than £10,000. The copyright of her writings fell to her daughter, Rosanna, who entrusted the running of the OMS to two of Montalban's initiates, married couple Jo Sheridan and Alfred Douglas, who were authorised as the exclusive publishers of her correspondence course. Sheridan – whose real name was Patricia Douglas – opened an alternative therapy centre in Islington, North London, in the 1980s, before retiring to Rye, East Sussex in 2002, where she continued running the OMS correspondence course until her death in 2011.

== Personal life and magico-religious beliefs ==
According to her biographer Julia Philips, Montalban had been described by her magical students as "tempestuous, generous, humorous, demanding, kind, capricious, talented, volatile, selfish, goodhearted, [and] dramatic". Philips noted that she was a woman who made a "definite impression" in all those whom she encountered, but who equally could be quite shy and disliked being interviewed in anything other than print. Philips asserted that Montalban had a "mercurial personality" and could be kind and generous at one moment and fly into a violent temper the next. Several of her friends noted that she was prudish when it came to sexual matters, and her friend Maxine Sanders stated that even as an elderly lady Montalban boasted of only taking men under the age of twenty-five as her lovers. She would take great pleasure in causing arguments, particularly between a couple who were romantically involved.

Describing herself as a "pagan", Montalban's personal faith was Luciferian in basis, revolving around the veneration of Lucifer, or Lumiel, whom she considered to be a benevolent angelic being who had aided humanity's development. Within her Order, she emphasised that her followers discover their own personal relationship with the angelic beings, including Lumiel. Montalban considered astrology to be a central part of her religious worldview, and always maintained that one could be a good magician only if they had mastered astrology. Her correspondence course focused around the seven planetary bodies that were known in the ancient world and the angelic beings that she associated with them: Michael (Sun), Gabriel (Moon), Samael (Mars), Raphael (Mercury), Sachiel (Jupiter), Anael (Venus) and Cassiel (Saturn). Each of these beings was in turn associated with certain days, hours, minerals, plants, and animals, each of which could be used in the creation of talismans that invoked the angelic power. Montalban disliked the theatrical use of props and rites in ceremonial magic, such as that performed by the Hermetic Order of the Golden Dawn, preferring a more simplistic use of ritual.

== Legacy ==
The Triumph of the Moon, a 1999 history of Wicca by Bristol University historian Ronald Hutton, noted that Montalban was "one of England's most prominent occultists" of the 20th century. Michael Howard referred to Montalban's teachings in The Book of Fallen Angels, a 2004 study of Luciferian mythology, which religious studies scholar Fredrik Gregorius notes played an "important [role] in furthering an interest" in Montalban's ideas.

In 2012, Neptune Press – the publishing arm of Bloomsbury's Atlantis Bookshop – released the biography Madeline Montalban: The Magus of St Giles, written by Anglo-Australian Wiccan Julia Philips. Philips noted that for much of the project she found it difficult separating fact from fiction when it came to Montalban's life, but that she had been able to nevertheless put together a biographical account, albeit incomplete, of "one of the truly great characters of English occultism."
