= Daniel Delander =

British clockmaker (died 1733)

Daniel Delander (died 1733), also known as De Lander or Delaunder, was a notable London clock and watch maker coming from a dynasty of clockmakers.

== Biography ==
Successor to Nathaniel Delander, Daniel Delander was apprenticed in 1692 to Charles Halstead and, later, to Thomas Tompion; he became a member of the Clockmakers' Company in 1699. He opened his own shop at the Dial in Devereux Court in 1706 and worked there until 1712. Then he relocated to Two Temple Gates where he stayed until 1717, and finally he moved to Fleet Street, where he toiled until his death in 1733. Delander invented the lock spring for securing watch cases and was the first to produce an independent centre seconds stopwatch. Delander also built many mantel clocks and longcase clocks. His son Nathaniel Delander II continued the family tradition.

== Legacy ==
There are clocks by Delander at the Science Museum and Guildhall Museum in London and at the Metropolitan Museum of Art in New York City. The British Museum (Ilbert Collection) has the oldest independent-seconds watch, built by Delander in 1720.

== Gallery ==
Clocks and watches by Daniel Delander

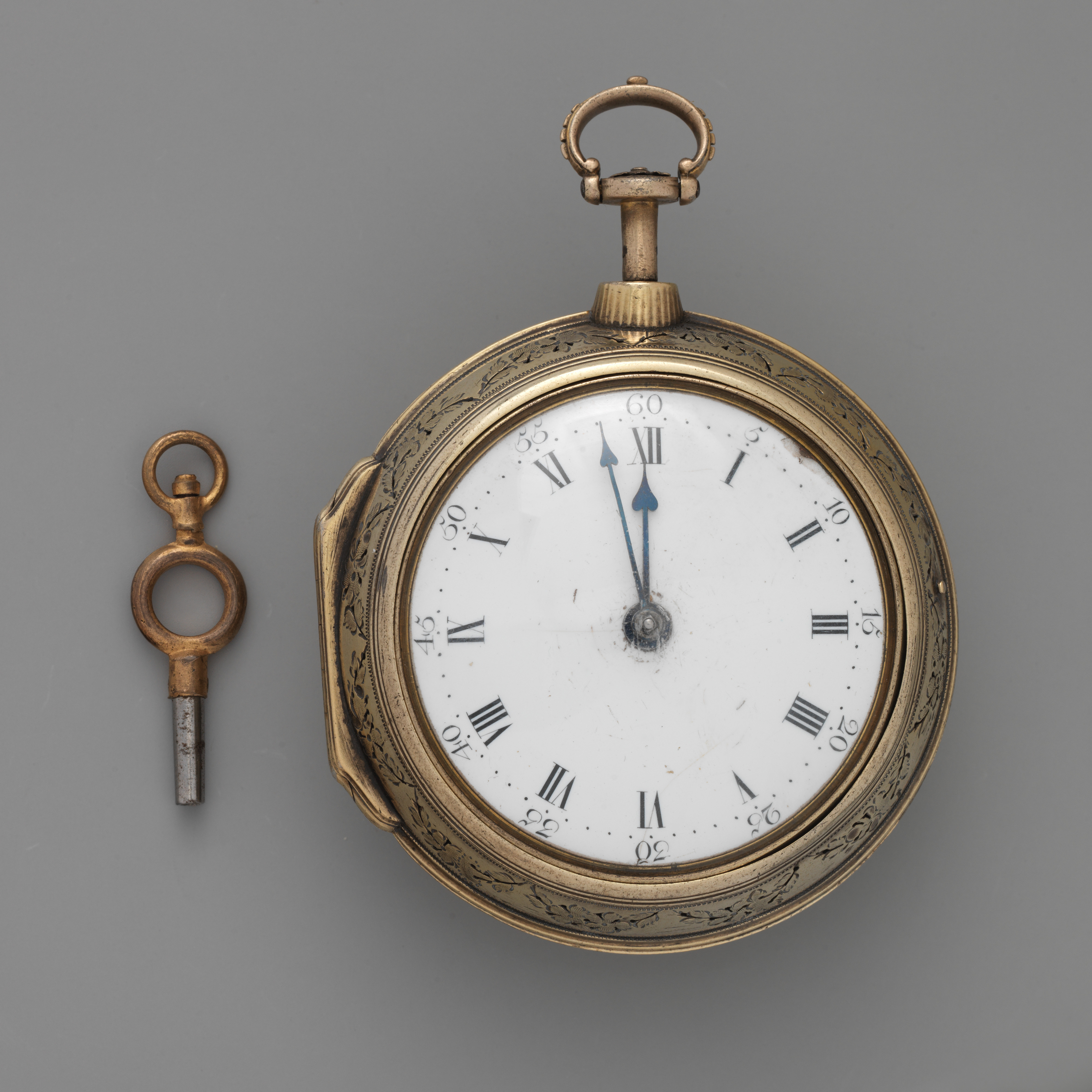

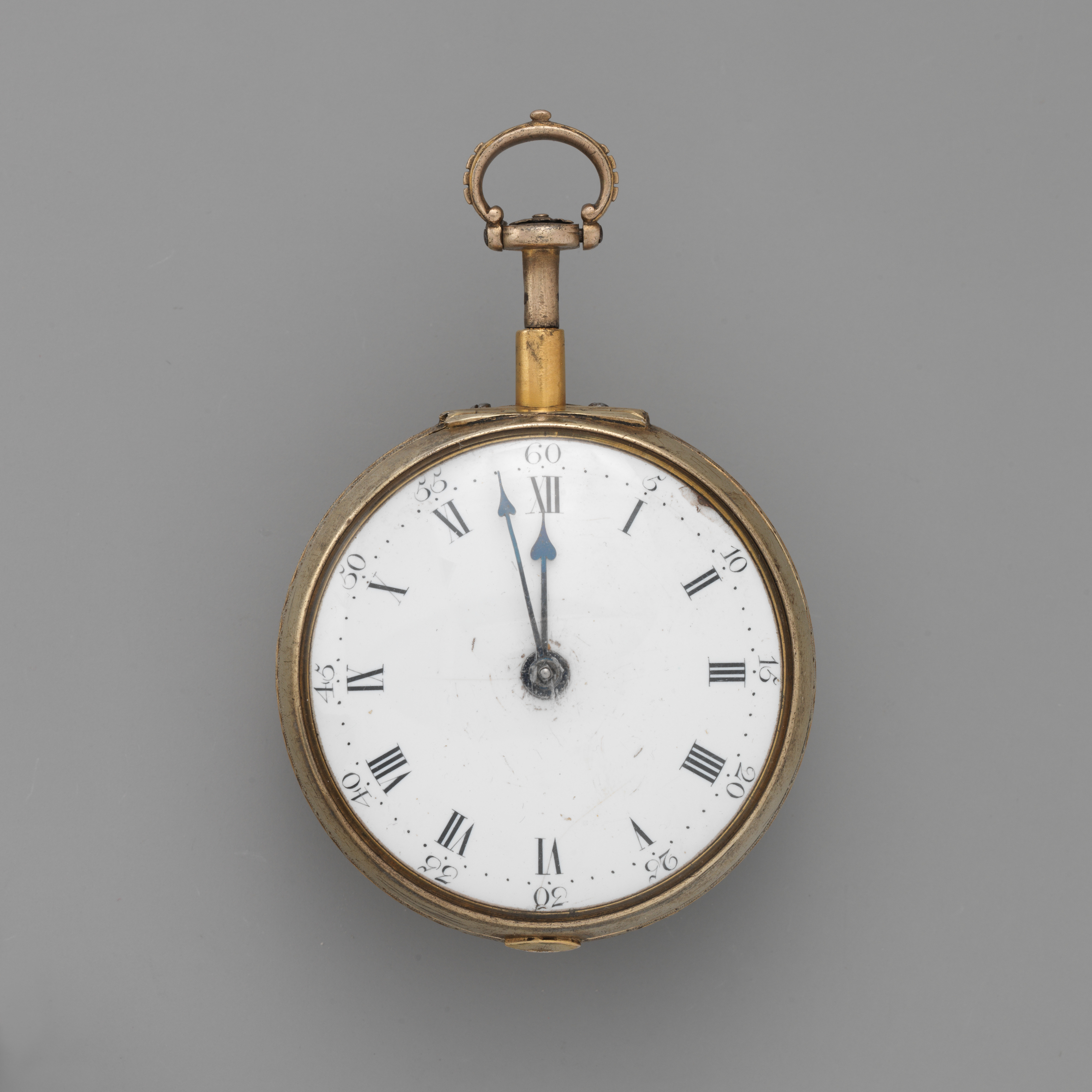

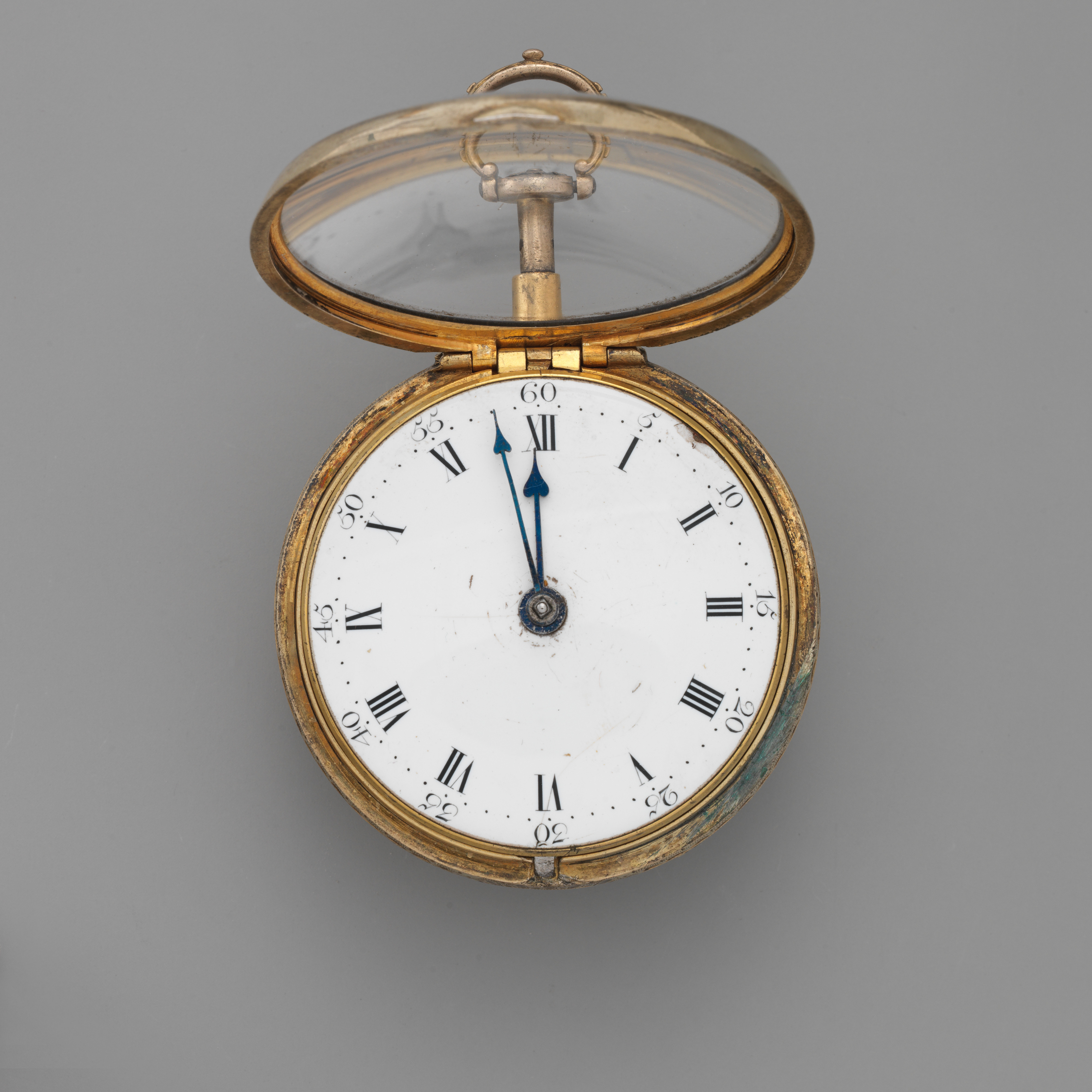

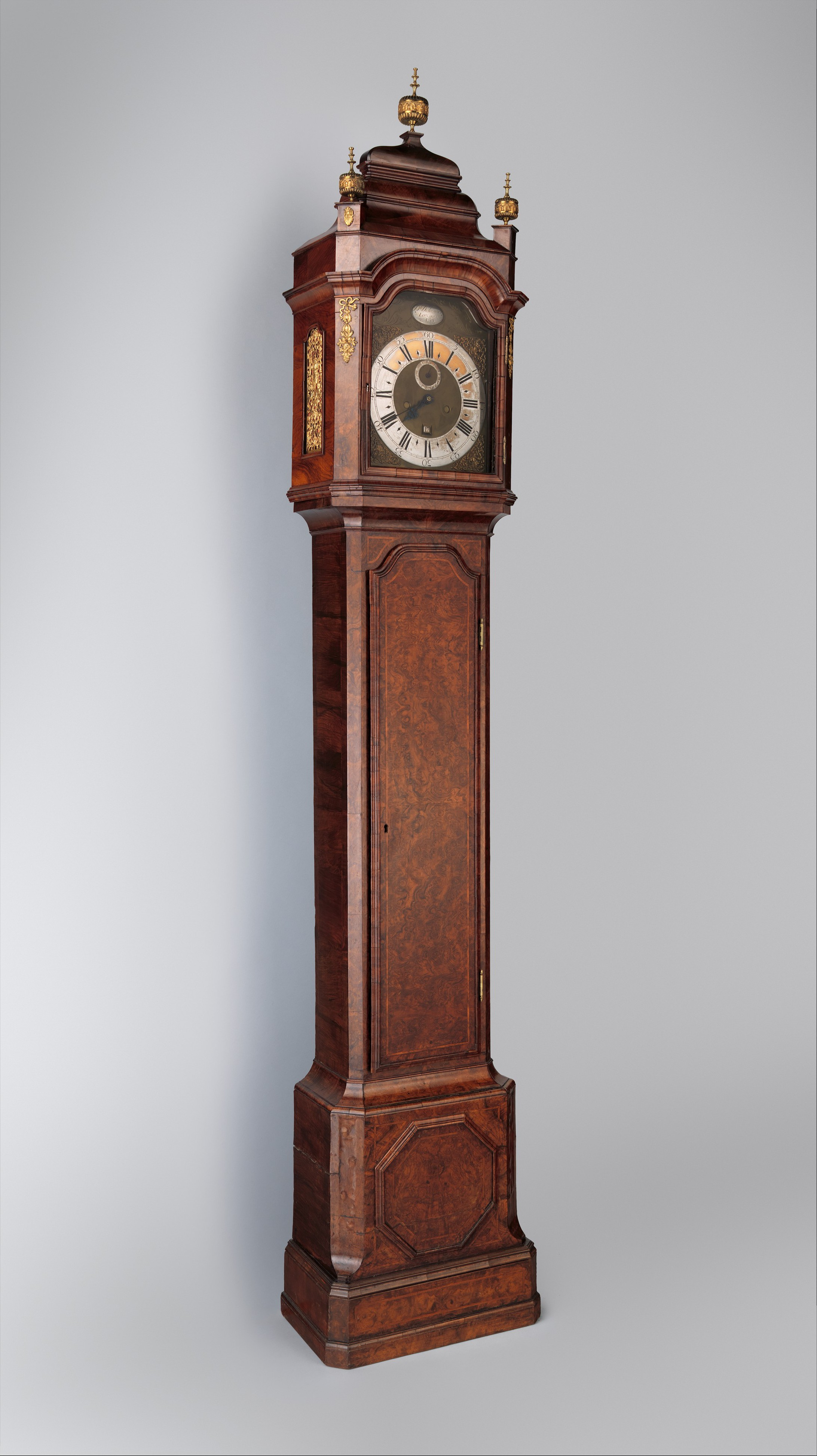

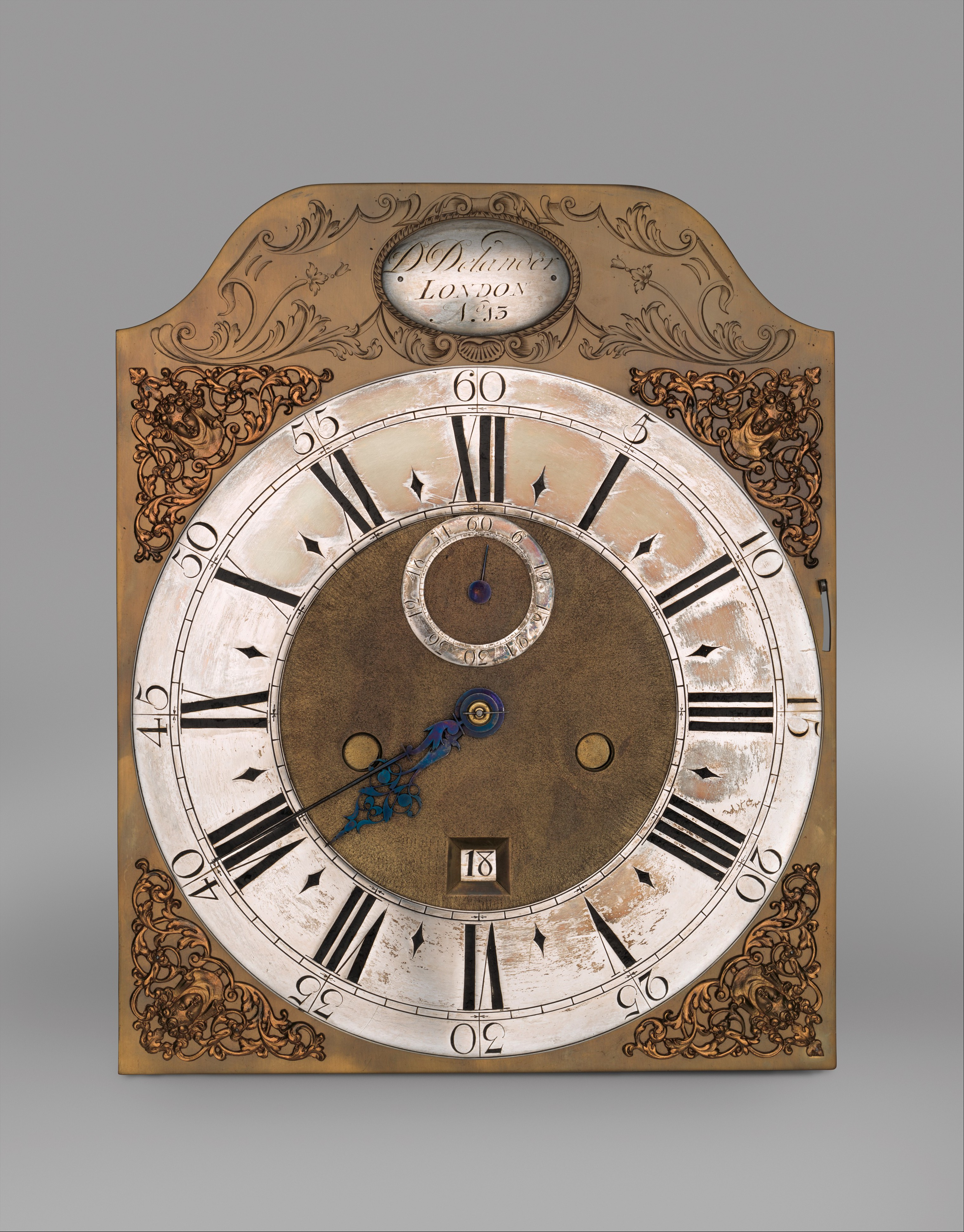

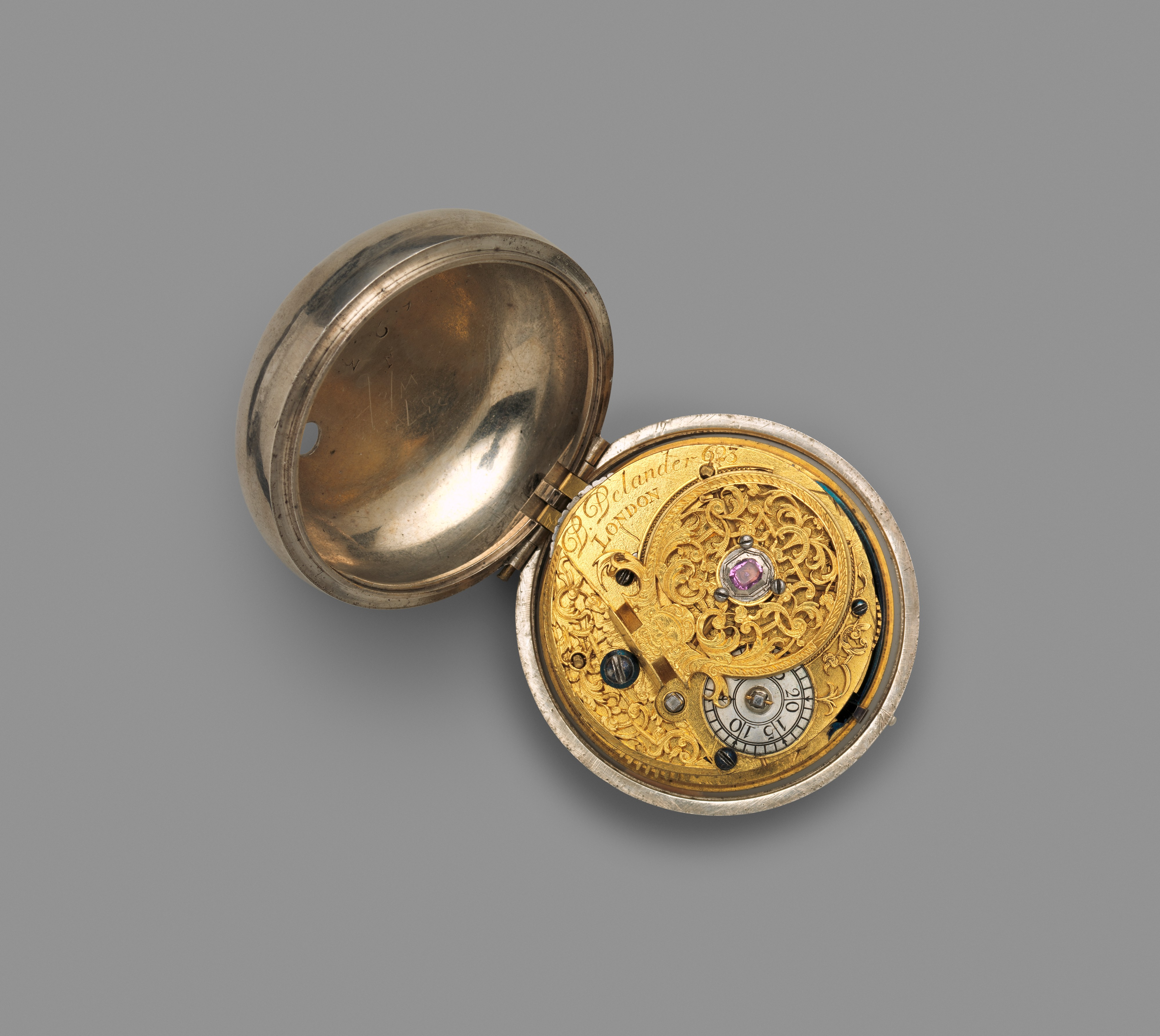

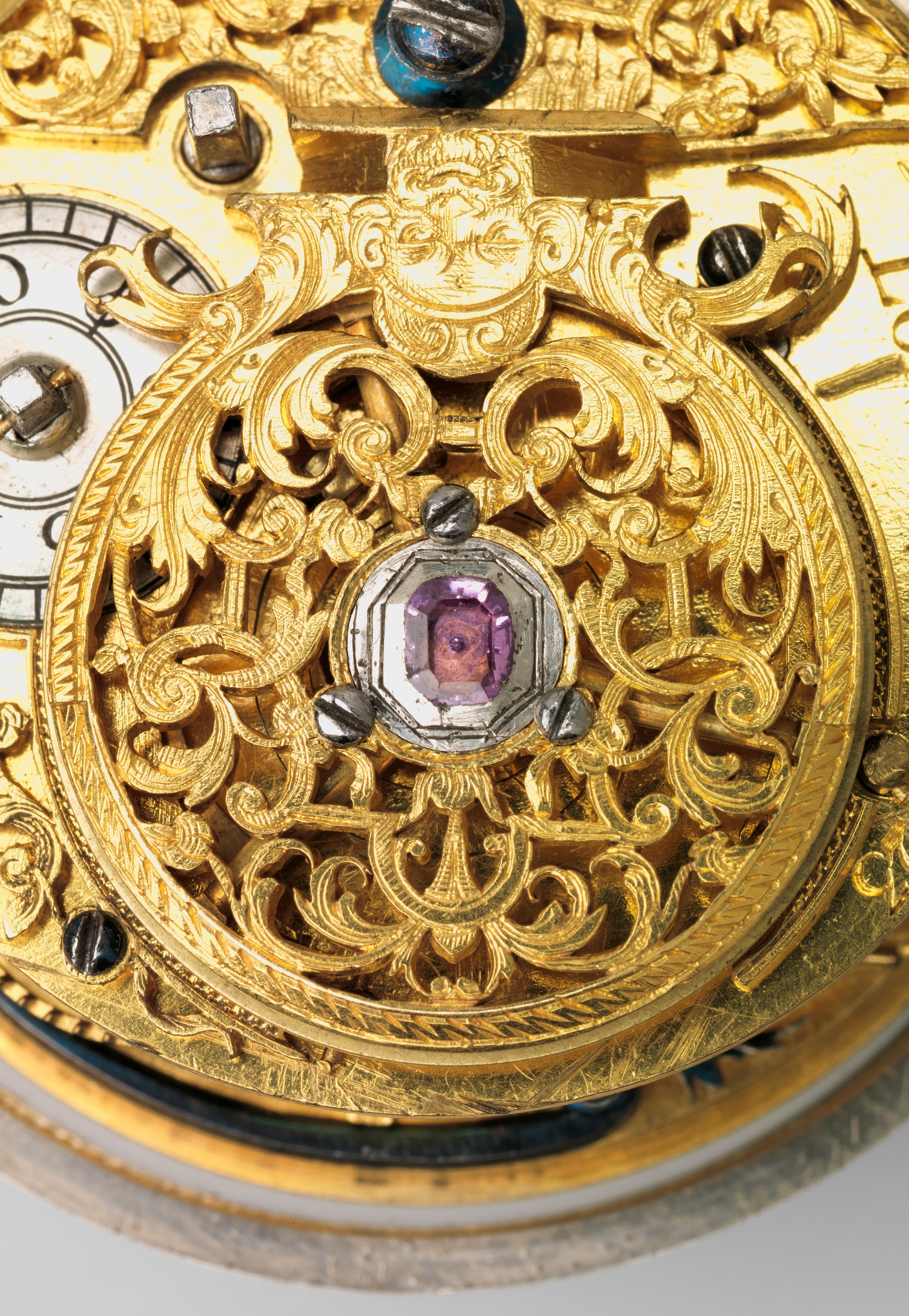

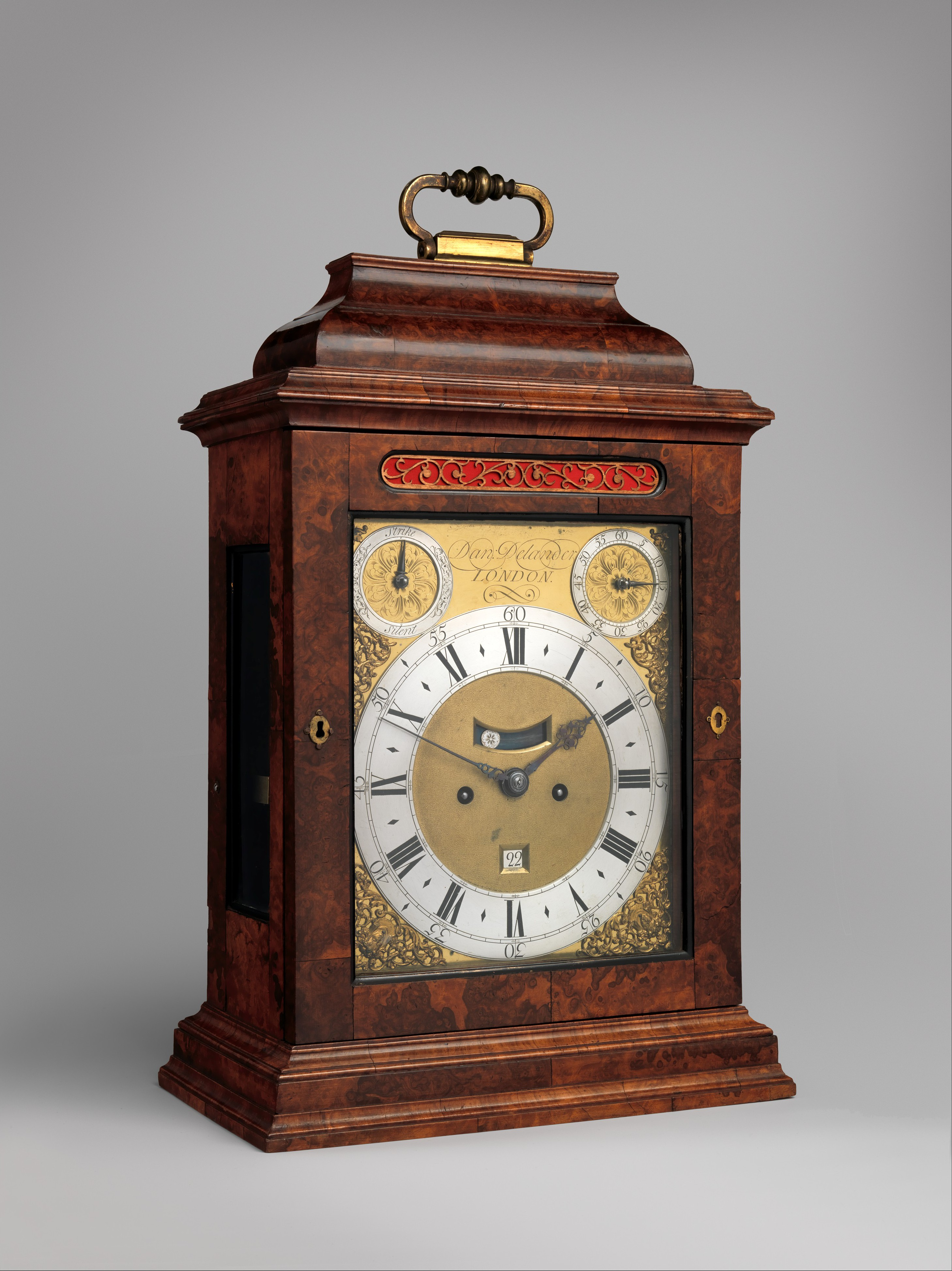
