= Into the Maelstrom =

Into the Maelstrom or Descent Into the Maelstrom may refer to:

- "A Descent into the Maelström", a short story by Edgar Allan Poe
- Into the Maelstrom (Dungeons & Dragons)
- Into the Maelstrom, a 2005 sci-fi film directed by Peter Sullivan, part of the 48 Hour Film Project with Eric Etebari

== Music ==
=== Albums ===
- Descent into the Maelstrom, album by Lennie Tristano (1952)
- Solo: A Descent Into the Maelstrom, album by Chris Cutler (2001)
- Descent into the Maelstrom, album by Cultus Sabbati (2011)
- Into the Maelstrom (album), album by Bigelf (2014)

=== Songs ===
- "Descent into the Maelstrom", song by Radio Birdman from Radios Appear (1977)
- "Descent into the Maelström", song by the progressive rock band Crack from their album Si Todo Hiciera Crack (1979)
- "Ascent into the Maelstrom", song by Evoken from Embrace the Emptiness (1998)
- "Into the Maelstrom", song by the Redwalls from The Redwalls (album) (2007)
