= The Edgar Wallace =

Public house in London

Coordinates: 51.512706°N 0.112749°W

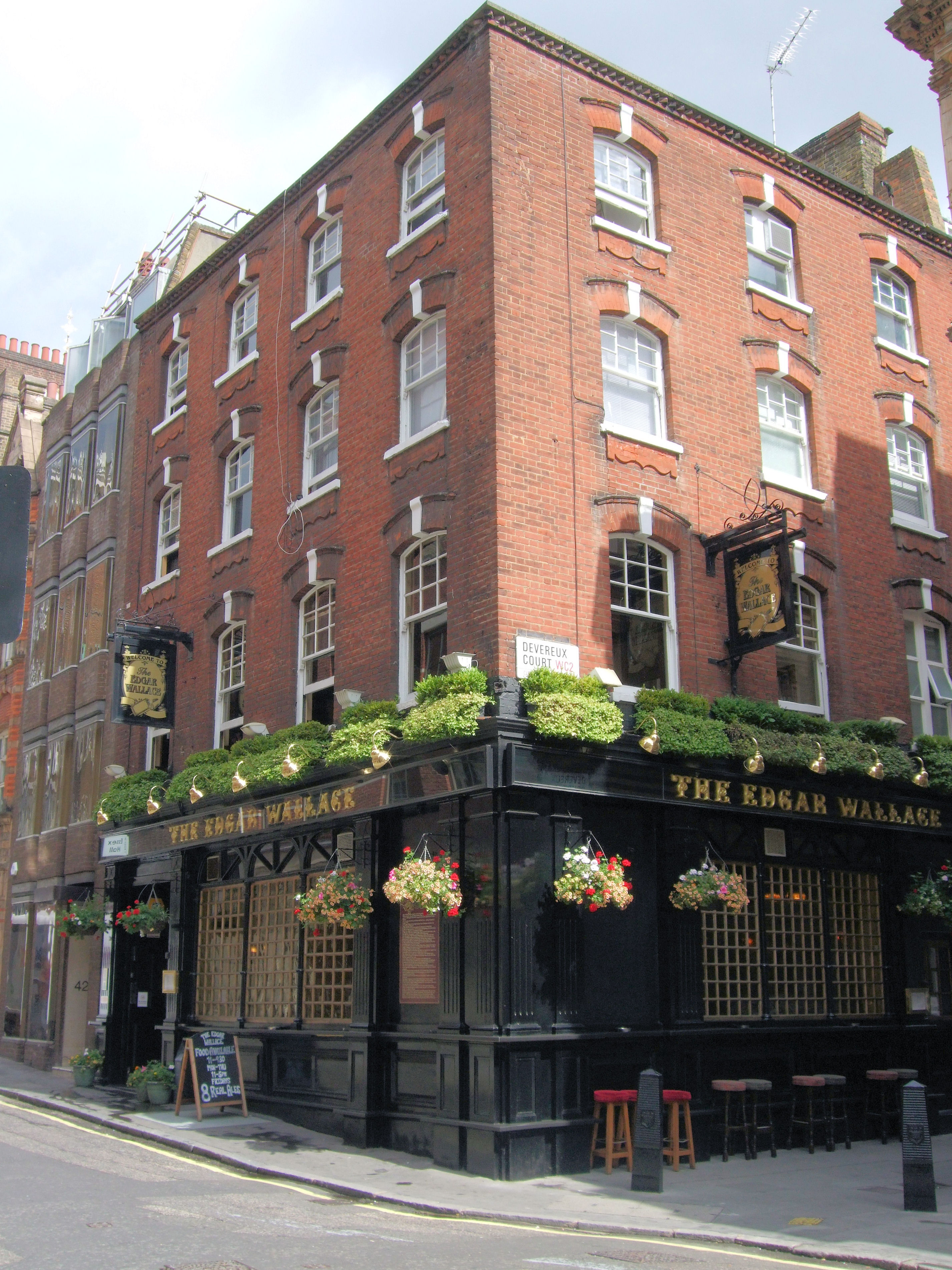
The Edgar Wallace in 2010

The Edgar Wallace is a public house at 40–41 Essex Street, London WC2, at the corner with Devereux Court.

The pub dates back to 1777, and was originally The Essex Head. The landlord then was Samuel Greaves, a former servant of the Thrale family where Samuel Johnson had lodged and Johnson and his friend Richard Brocklesby established the Essex Head Club in the tavern in 1783.

It was renamed in 1975 to commemorate the crime writer Edgar Wallace's birth centenary.
