= Cultus Sabbati (band) =

Ritual noise music trio

- Genres: Black metal, dark ambient, power electronics, witchnoise
- Years active: 2006–2013
- Labels: Rococo Records; Land of Decay; Buh Records
- Members: Malak Taus, Malak Azrael, Malak Israfael
- Website: Official Cultus Sabbati Website

Cultus Sabbati was an anonymous ritual noise music trio formed in 2006. The three members, whose identities are unknown even to their labels, began making music as a form of ritual magic after meeting through their other projects. Their music has been called black metal, power electronics, "occult dub", dark ambient and they themselves refer to their music as "witchnoise". The band announced their dissolution on their Facebook in 2013. In May 2014 the former members of Cultus Sabbati announced the formation of the group HK8 (pronounced hek ate) and the release of their first album on June 21.

== Origins ==
Thematically Cultus Sabbati's albums draw from ideas of cunning craft, traditional witchcraft, Norse mythology and Sufism. Their work tends to draw from literary pieces as well as from occult ideas. Descent into the Maelstrom takes its name from the story by Edgar Allan Poe of the same name. Garden of Forking Ways takes its name from the Sandman comic by Neil Gaiman.

While little is known of the personnel the band states that it is a trio with its members using the names "Malak Taus" (vocals), "Malak Azrael" (electronics) and "Malek Israfel" (guitars). In interviews on The Quietus and Pitchfork the band states that it performs its music ritually inside of a circle with its musical equipment and recording devices inside the ritual circle and the amplifiers outside. The band claims to have met while touring in other projects at festivals.

The name Cultus Sabbati translates from the Latin to "worshipper of the sabbath." Yet the band apparently draws its name from a group of witches founded by the late occultist Andrew Chumbley.

== Location ==
Brandon Stousy of Stereogum quotes the band as saying they "try to avoid locations" although Stousy claims in the same article that they reside in Canada. Various blogs have claimed Norway, Australia, the United Kingdom and other countries of origin, though none are confirmed.

== Discography ==
=== Albums ===
- The Auraeon – 2008 (self-released)
- The Garden of Forking Ways – 2010 (Rococo Records)
- Descent into the Maelstrom – 2011 (Land of Decay/Buh Records)
- The Hagiography of Baba Yaga – 2012 (Land of Decay)
- Asgardsreia – 2012 (Pitchfork)

=== EPs ===
- Modraniht – 2011
- Woden's Galder – 2010

=== Video ===
- Beyond the Walls of Layla (35min video EP) – 2012
- The Serpent Hewn – 2011
- Mouth of the Beast (directed by Shazzula) – 2011
- Descent into the Maelstrom – 2010
- Garden of Forking Ways (Shining Edit) – 2009
- Garden of Forking Ways – 2009
- Nothing Compares 2 U (Sinéad O'Connor cover) 2008
- Defiled Opposer – 2008
