= Michael W. Ford =

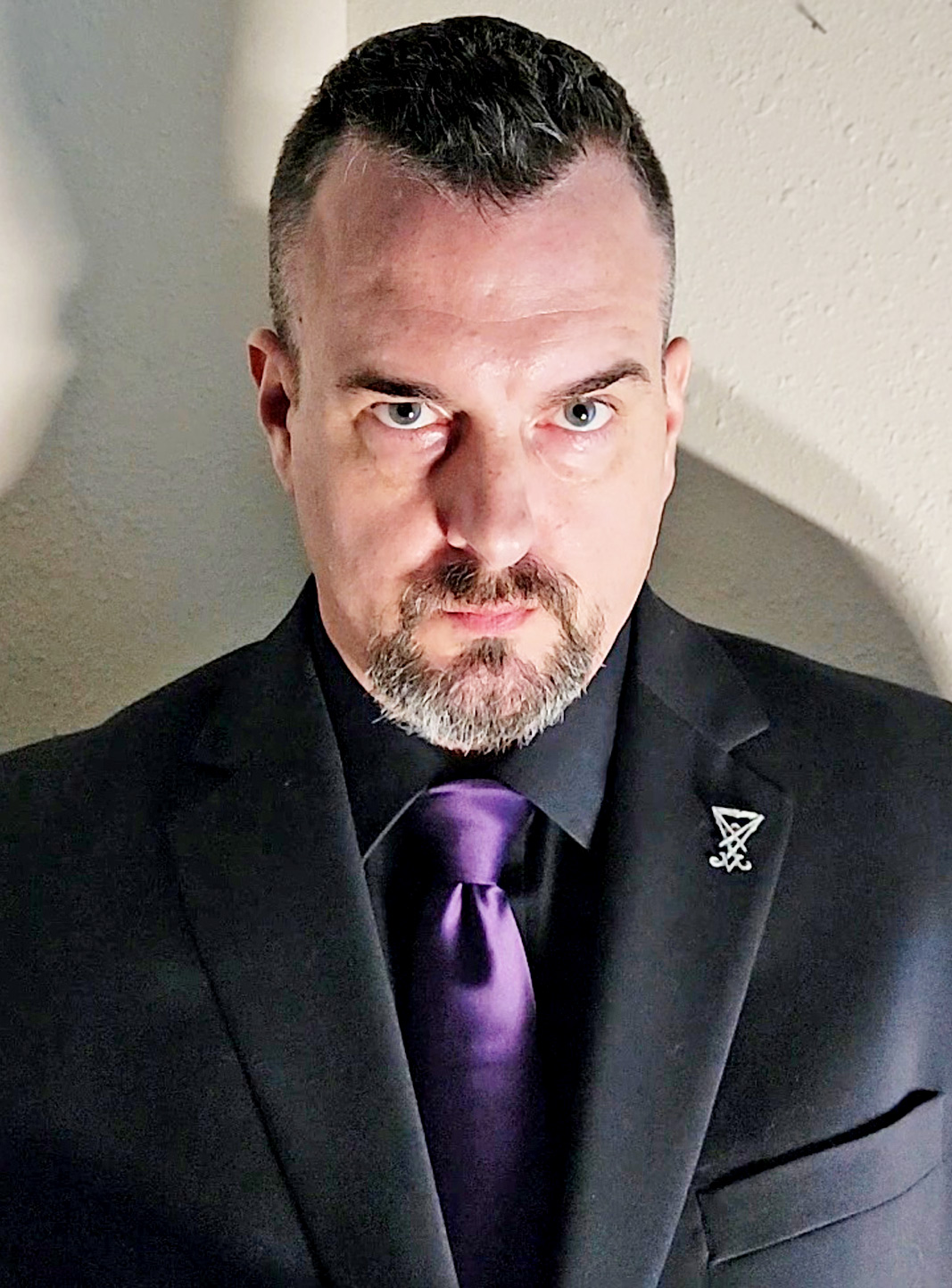
- Occultist and Luciferian; Author, Recording Artist.

Background information
- Also known as: Baron von Abaddon, Baron Drakkheim Abaddon, Akhtya, Akhtya Nachttoter
- Born: July 4, 1976
- Genres: black metal, dark ambient, industrial
- Occupations: Occultist, Author, Musician, Recording Artist, founder of Luciferian Apotheca and Succubus Productions Publishing.
- Instruments: Synthesizer, Vocals, Bass, Kangling,
- Years active: 1993-present
- Labels: Dark Adversary Productions, Iron Bonehead Productions, Osmose Productions, Succubus Productions
- Website: akhtya.bandcamp.com

Michael W. Ford (born July 4, 1976) is an American occultist, writer, and musician. He is the former co-president of the Greater Church of Lucifer (now the Assembly of Light Bearers) which is one of the first Luciferian organizations in the United States. Ford has published a number of books on the occult and recorded a number of albums as well. As an occultist and Luciferian, Michael's published books include: Apotheosis, The Bible of the Adversary, Liber HVHI, Drauga - Ahrimanian Yatuk Dinoih, Infernal Union: Sinister Initiation & Satanic Psalms, Akhkharu - Vampyre Magick, Lilith and Lamastu, Whispers of the Jinn, and Hecate & the Black Arts among others.

== Luciferianism ==
Ford began to study and write about Lucifer and established a philosophy and magickal practice which formulated one avenue of modern Luciferianism. He self-published his first book in 1999. As of 2025, Ford has published via his publishing company, Succubus Productions Publishing, with over 27 books. Ford's works have been translated and published in Italy, Peru, Brazil, France, Germany (Book of the Witch Moon), Serbian (Wisdom of Eosphoros) Regarding the content of his books, Ford presents both theistic and atheistic approaches to Luciferianism. His book The Wisdom of Eosphoros (2015) formed the basis of the Luciferian philosophy taught at the Greater Church of Lucifer.

Ford is the owner of Luciferian Apotheca, a left-hand path occult shop opened in 2007 that still operates as of 2026.

Ford opened the Greater Church of Lucifer in Old Town Springs, Texas on Halloween 2015. There were a variety of responses from the Christian community. Many Christians came to protest the event. Protestors sprayed holy water on the church and surrounding buildings. Some people boycotted the town of Old Town Spring in response to the church. The church itself was vandalized. Its windows were smashed. Most notably, the branch of a 200-year-old pecan tree hanging over the church was sawn off in the middle of the night and damaged the roof. The Greater Church of Lucifer described this as an act of terrorism. Ford stated that The Greater Church of Lucifer was forced to shut down one year later because their landlord refused to renew their lease after receiving death threats.

== Music ==
In 1993, Ford formed Black Funeral, a black metal band, in Indianapolis.

Akhtya is Ford's ritualistic dark ambient project that has released twenty-two albums Ford recorded with a number of other bands as well: Akhtya, Valefor, Sorath, Darkness Enshroud, Akhkharu, Ordo Tyrannis, Atra Mors, Hexentanz, and Psychonaut 75. He also did guest work for several other bands such as Drowning the Light, Horda Profana, Profezia, Bitter Peace, and Corona Barathri.
