= Oksana Linde =

Electronic music producer

- Оксана Лінде
- Born: 1948 (age 77–78); Caracas, Venezuela
- Education: Chemist
- Alma mater: Universidad de Oriente, Universidad Central de Venezuela Venezuelan Institute for Scientific Research
- Occupations: Electronic musician; composer; Visual artist
- Years active: 1983–present
- Notable work: Aquatic and Other Worlds
- Spouse: C. Ochoa (m. 1969)
- Children: 2 daughters
- Parents: Ivan Linde (father); Halyna Krychevska-Linde (mother)
- Relatives: Vasyl Krychevsky, Fedir Krychevsky
- Website: https://oksanalindek.bandcamp.com/

Oksana Linde (born 1948) is a Venezuelan composer and electronic music performer. Her debut album was released in 2022, featuring recordings made during the 1980s.

== Career ==
Linde was born to Ukrainian immigrants in Caracas, Venezuela and learnt piano from an early age. Daughter of Ivan Linde and Halyna Krychevska Linde, her maternal grandfather was the painter and designer Vasyl Krychevsky and her great-uncle was the painter Fedir Krychevsky. She studied for a Master of Science degree at Universidad Central de Venezuela, while working at the Venezuelan Institute for Scientific Research, but side effects from the chemicals she worked with caused demyelination, seizures, and memory loss, and she abandoned her studies.

Linde began experimenting with creating music at this time and she played in some group projects with other students. After leaving her studies she purchased equipment for a home studio, including Casio CZ-1 and Polymoog synthesisers, a TEAC A-3440 reel-to-reel machine, Roland tape echo effect and others.

The first piece of music Linde composed was "Cosmos" in 1982, followed by "Descubrimiento" in 1983. Two years later her piece "Mariposas Acuaticas" was included on the French compilation SNX, and between 1984-1986 she had recorded over thirty pieces, including some for TV, radio, and theatre. In 1991 she was included as part of the third Festival of Electronic Music in Caracas, but outside of some international radio play her work remained largely unreleased.

After having to care for her sick mother, Linde sold most of her instruments and recording equipment. She later began creating new music on a computer using the audio editing software Audacity which was shared on Myspace and ReverbNation.

In 2019, her music came to the attention of Cher-ee-lee and Andrea Zarza Canova who included Linde's "Reverie II" on their Dream Tech compilation. This led to Luis Alvarado of Buh Records discovering her work, and he organised the release of her debut album Aquatic and Other Worlds which compiled work recorded between 1983-1989. At the time, a second and third album compiling further archival recordings was planned for future release by Buh Records. An album, Travesías, collecting work recorded between 1986-1994, was released in 2025.

Since releasing Aquatic and Other Worlds, Linde's music has been likened to other early electronic musicians like Delia Derbyshire. In their review, Electronic Sound Magazine wrote she was closer to Wendy Carlos and Isao Tomita than Derbyshire, while The Wire likewise noted the comparisons to artists like Derbyshire and Carlos, and wrote the release of Linde's music was a lesson in how so many other female electronic composers were unrecognised.

== Discography ==
Compilation appearances

- 1985 - SNX - Hawai
- 2020 - Dream Tech - Mana
- 2022 - Below The Radar 39 - Wire Magazine

Albums

- 2022 - Aquatic And Other Worlds (1983-1989) - Buh Records
- 2025 - Travesías - Buh Records
