= Andrew D. Chumbley =

British occult writer

- Born: 15 September 1967
- Died: 15 September 2004 (aged 37)
- Occupation(s): Magician, writer, poet, artist

Andrew D. Chumbley (15 September 1967 – 15 September 2004) was an English practitioner and theorist of magic, and a writer, poet and artist. He was Magister of the UK-based magical group Cultus Sabbati.

== Career ==
Chumbley published several limited edition books through his private press Xoanon Publishing, and had many articles printed in occult magazines. Their subject was the doctrine and practice of a tradition of sorcery which he called 'Sabbatic Craft', a term which, according to Chumbley, "describes the way in which elements of witch-lore, Sabbath mythology and imagery were being employed in the cunning-craft tradition into which I was originally inducted". He claimed that this tradition was founded in two lineages of traditional witchcraft, both pre-dating "those modern revivalist forms of witchcraft, which have become generically nominalised as 'wicca'". Chumbley's early articles were published in the chaos magic journal Chaos International; later articles appeared in Starfire, journal of the Typhonian OTO, and in the long-established British witchcraft journal The Cauldron. Daniel A. Schulke succeeded him as Magister of Cultus Sabbati.

== Personality ==
In an obituary his close friend Michael Howard, a well-known occult writer and publisher of The Cauldron, described Chumbley as "a man of the land, rural in both birth and character. He fitted totally within the traditional archetypal parameters of the English (and specifically Essex) cunning man." Howard recalled Chumbley’s kindness, generosity and sense of humour: "To outsiders Andrew could sometimes appear to be aloof, intense and serious to the point of obsession... However, if he met kindred spirits of sincerity and honour, who shared his interests and serious intent, he would willingly go out of his way to offer them help and guidance on the Path... In fact he was a natural teacher and, like all good occult teachers, acted as a catalyst in the lives of his students."

== Influences ==
Although Chumbley was mainly known for his involvement with English traditional witchcraft, primarily that of East Anglia, his occult interests and influences were extremely diverse. According to Schulke, "Chumbley's magical work spanned many fields of sorcerous influence, including Sufism, left-hand Tantra and Petro Voodoo". Other influences included the artist-occultist Austin Osman Spare and author-occultist Kenneth Grant. Chumbley was familiar with and respected Grant's work and was a member of Grant's Ordo Templi Orientis from 1993 to 1999, operating an affiliated magical lodge. Spare's philosophy of the Kia almost certainly influenced the "non-dual gnosis" which is a key element in Chumbley's system, although the similar "doctrine of the void" (Shunyavata), a foundation concept of Tantrism, is also likely to have affected Chumbley's work through the Uttara Kaula Sampradaya, of which he claimed to be an initiate. In The Azoëtia Chumbley presents "Will, Desire, Belief" as a threefold unity operating in sorcery; this is ultimately derived from Spare's work, although the primary textual source is Grant. The use of sigils and magical glyphs in Chumbley's work also suggests a derivation from Spare, though classical magical grimoires such as the Key of Solomon and the Goëtia provide an earlier precedent.

The Azoëtia and Chumbley's subsequent writings demonstrate his familiarity with a broad range of Western esoteric doctrines including Qabalah, Enochian Magic, the magic of the Hermetic Order of the Golden Dawn and the Thelemic school of Aleister Crowley. Another influence was the neo-Sufi author Idries Shah, particularly his theories concerning possible connections between witchcraft and various near-eastern cults such as the Yezidi, Mandaeans, Sufis and Zoroastrians. Chumbley addressed these themes, citing Shah's work, in his book Qutub: The Point (1995).

Regarding his sources, drawn from both literature and direct contact with practitioners of other occult and religious traditions, Chumbley stated: "In all contexts one may find pieces of magical lore and belief from many disparate times and places, but all are brought to function within the trans-historical arena of the sacred dimension, whether it be the magical circle of Witcherie or the Ninefold Plot of Sigaldry." Schulke observed that "Chumbley's grimoire Azoëtia, though wholly a reification of traditional British witchcraft, makes use of Sumerian, Egyptian, Yezidi, Arabic, and Aztec iconography, among others."

== Doctrine and method ==
Chumbley's work promotes a doctrine of 'Transcendental Sorcery', founded on his belief that all forms of magic arise from a single source, which he termed the 'Magical Quintessence': "Magick is the transmutability of the Quintessence of all nature ... Sorcery is the knowledge of the universal points of transmutation. Its Art is to cultivate the ability to manipulate these foci of power in accordance with Will, Desire and Belief."

Chumbley considered the practice of willed dreaming essential as a means of interacting directly and consciously with the spiritual dimensions he called 'the High Sabbat'; according to him "Every word, deed and thought can empower, magnetise, and establish points of receptivity for a magical dream, likewise any of these means can do the opposite—fixating perception in a manner that is not receptive—that seals the soul in the body instead of enabling it to go forth at will." In conjunction with dreaming and trance experience Chumbley used automatic writing and drawing to manifest the knowledge drawn from ritual magic; these procedures, in which the magician offers her or himself as a vehicle for the forces summoned instead of using another as medium, is not uncommon in the Western occult tradition - one modern exemplar being Austin Osman Spare. The results of Chumbley's practices can be seen in his drawings and sigillisations. Chumbley believed that the natural manifestation of magical gnosis and power occurs through creative activity: "Dreaming and the mutual translation of dreamt ritual and ritual-as-dreamt form the basic rationale and context for our work. The active discourse between initiates and our spirit-patrons inspires and motivates this dreaming. This is demonstrably manifest in the magical artistry of individual initiates, whether through text, ritual performance, song, tapestry, craftsmanship, or image."

== Written and illustrated works ==
=== The Azoëtia ===
Chumbley's first book The Azoëtia was published privately by the author in 1992 as a softcover volume under the Xoanon imprint. The work received positive reviews from other contemporary practitioners including Jan Fries and Phil Hine.

Described as "...a complete recension of Sabbatic theory and praxis, relating the Three Great Rites of Ingress, Congress, and Egress, together with a detailed exposition of the 22 Letters of the Sorcerer's Alphabet", the book forms a résumé of Chumbley's system and is the core text for practitioners wishing to study and practise the Sabbatic path of magic. A tenth anniversary edition, revised to include further textual and illustrative material was issued by Xoanon Publishing on October 31, 2002, as Azoëtia (Sethos Edition). Part of the book's significance in modern occult literature lies in its conscious reinvention of the format of the "grimoire", or sorcerer's instruction book.

Gavin Semple hailed The Azoëtia as "a very different type of book; a genuine Grimoire, likely the only one to be published in modern times; [...] The Azoëtia is a work of breathtaking power and passion, in whose pages magic is restored to its position as the Sacred Art, the Sabbatic Craft is revealed as a living and very vital tradition."

=== Qutub: The Point ===
Qutub: The Point followed in 1995, published for Xoanon by Fulgur Limited, in which Chumbley combined illustrations and poetry with the intent of creating a telesmatic volume. The illustrations demonstrated that Chumbley's skills as a draughtsman were advancing quickly. The book was described as follows: "This work treats of the Arcanum of the Opposer, a magical formula of the Crooked Path concerning the Powers of Self-overcoming. The book consists of an arcane poetic text in 72 verses, a detailed commentary in critical prose, and a substantial glossary of esoteric terms and names. The whole is illustrated throughout with calligraphic and sigillic depictions of the Opposer's composite mysteries." Issued in several different hard bindings as standard, deluxe and private editions, copies of Qutub included unique additions such as hand-drawn talismans or sigillised inscriptions.

A second printing of Qutub, in two editions, was issued by Xoanon in March 2009. The standard edition is limited to 700 hardbound copies. The deluxe hardbound, slipcased edition is limited to 72 copies.

Michael Staley, a senior member of the Typhonian OTO and editor of Starfire Magazine, described the Qabalistic concept of the book as follows: "Qutub is the Point. Its root, QTB, enumerates as 111. We have immediately the essence of the matter, since 'The Point' suggests Kether and 111 suggests Aleph, the Fool, Atu 0, etc. 'The Point' is the deliciously-sharp point of insight into the reality beyond and underlying its expression in terms of duality. The idea called forth by the correspondence with Atu 0 is that of the illumined adept who has experienced this Point, realised its imminence in everything and at all times, and who is thereby liberated whilst yet living. It is this delicious insight which is conveyed by the very best of 'mystical poetry'." Staley credited Chumbley's poetry as "accomplished", but found it sometimes too long-winded.

=== ONE: The Grimoire of the Golden Toad ===
Numerous articles by Chumbley followed, published in British and American occult journals, but no further books appeared until ONE: The Grimoire of the Golden Toad in 2000, described by Xoanon as: "...the first full grimoire-text to treat specifically and from personal account of the Traditional East Anglian ritual called 'The Waters of the Moon': the solitary initiation of the so-called 'Toad-witch'." The purpose of this traditional folk-magical rite is to obtain a specific bone from the flensed corpse of a toad; the bone is believed to bestow certain powers upon its owner, primarily control of animals. Chumbley's ONE, however, presents a thoroughly antinomian re-visioning of the ritual procedure and its results, combining ritual practice with a series of dramatic visions recounted in prose-poetry. In Chumbley's recension it becomes clear that the "animal" over which power is sought is the practitioner's own human self. Seventy-seven hand-bound copies of the book were offered for sale, each copy accompanied by a hand-written page of a sigillic "inner grimoire", signed by the author, and an envelope containing a hand-painted talisman made from antique toadskin leather and a single blackthorn. A further three copies were retained "for internal distribution"; these were bound in leather with an actual toad's head set into the front cover, with toadskin leather panelling on the rear.

=== The Dragon Book of Essex ===
In the autumn of 2013 Publishers Xoanon announced that The Dragon Book of Essex will be published in Midwinter 2013. However, for undisclosed reasons publication date was pushed back to summer 2014.

The Dragon-Book of Essex was the intended second volume of a trilogy of Sabbatic grimoires, following Azoetia; it appears to be a very substantial work, described as "...a Compleat Grimoire of Crooked Path Sorcery, distilled from the many years of practice... Being the fruit of a decade of concentrated praxis in the Cultus' inner circle, this work is intended as an entire resumé of the ancestral and ophidian components of Traditional Sorcery and Sabbatic Gnosis." Ten copies were published circa 1998 as a private "initiatic" edition in three volumes totalling 1,200 pages.

=== Private and unpublished works ===
Other works by Chumbley are known to exist, but have not been issued; they were either unpublished at his death, or had been produced solely for private distribution.

The Auraeon was referred to by Chumbley as a forthcoming volume concerning solitary initiation, of which he said:

In the Sabbatic Craft, solitary initiation or 'The Lonely Road' is recognised as a vital aspect of every practitioner’s path and the understanding of ‘solitude’ is subject to many levels of interpretation. Autonomy is the key virtue, irrespective of whether one practices in human convocation or 'alone' – in the ever-present company of spirits."

Another volume titled The Greene Gospel is referred to in a footnote to Michael Howard's The Book of Fallen Angels (Capell Bann, 2004) where it is identified as being privately distributed.

Chumbley also created a series of singular artworks known as the 'Unique Transmission Series'. These were books which were individually hand-written and illustrated; according to the Xoanon website: "Each book is executed on hand-made paper, presented in a carved wooden box with accompanying telesmata and sealed letter to owner. Each text embodies a unique recension of a specific arcanum of the Crooked Path." The full number of works in the series was not disclosed, however one example, The Red Grimoire, is known to have been purchased by Jack Macbeth (Orlando Britts), and was referenced by him in his privately published book The Totemic Invocation of the Shadow Selves, one of several recent books styled as "grimoires" that have followed in the wake of The Azoëtia.

Chumbley's work is cited in several journals and books on the occult including The Journal for the Academic Study of Magic, a juried academic journal, Ronald Hutton's The Triumph of the Moon, Laurence Galian's The Sun at Midnight, Phil Hine's Oven Ready Chaos, The Pomegranate journal and The Cauldron magazine.

== Death ==
Chumbley died on his 37th birthday following a severe asthma attack. After his death, "his book values at second hand resale, which were already quite high, increased in an exponential and quite insane fashion within hours of his death becoming known." At the time of his death Chumbley was working on his doctorate in the history of religion.
