= Atlantis Bookshop =

Esoteric bookshop in London

Coordinates: 51.5174°N 0.1251°W

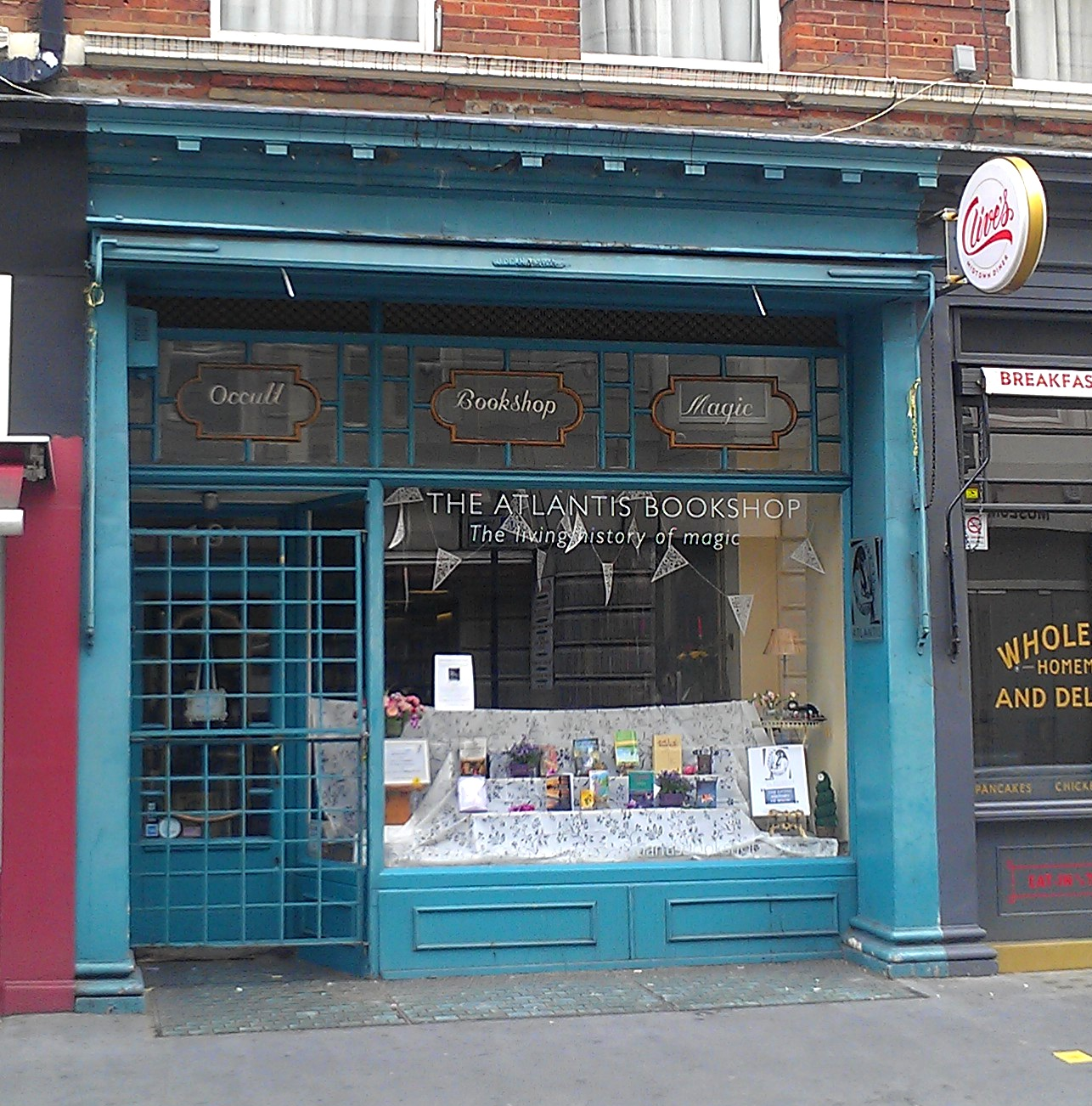
Exterior of the shop

The Atlantis Bookshop is an esoteric bookshop in Museum Street, London. Established by Michael Houghton in 1922, it is currently owned and run by Bali Beskin and her mother Geraldine.

== History ==
Atlantis has long been a hub for London's occult world. Gerald Gardner attended meetings of The Order of the Hidden Masters in its basement during his formative years, and also held meetings of his own Coven there. The shop published his first book on witchcraft, the novel High Magic's Aid. Here he also met Ross Nichols, later a key figure in the Druid world, who edited Gardner's 1954 Witchcraft Today.

In the 1980s, the Odin Brotherhood used the shop as a contact point.

== Current activities ==
Atlantis hosts art exhibitions and esoteric talks, workshops and book launches. For many years it ran a discussion group for pagans and magicians called "The Moot With No Name" in the nearby Devereux Arms off Fleet Street, which then moved to Milford's pub in Milford Lane as "The Atlantis Bookshop Presents" before ceasing some years ago. It also publishes occasional volumes under its own imprint, Neptune Press, for example an illuminated edition of Aleister Crowley's The Book of the Law.

== In popular culture ==
The shop featured in the British 1971 film Gumshoe.
