= Buh Records =

Record label in Lima, Peru

- Founded: 2004
- Founder: Luis Alvarado
- Genre: Experimental music
- Country of origin: Peru

Buh Records is a record label from Lima, Peru. It was founded by Luis Alvarado in 2004.

Buh is Spanish transliteration of the word “boo”. The label began after Luis Alvarado was writing about experimental music in Peru, and decided someone needed to reissue many of the out-of-print or largely unavailable releases.

They have released music in genres as diverse as dream pop, post-punk and free improvisation. Most of their artists are based in Peru, but they have also released music by USA based Amma Ateria and Nava Dunkelman, a compilation of underground electronic music from Switzerland, and work by Colombian composer Jacqueline Nova and Venezuelan Oksana Linde.

Alvarado has said his aim for Buh Records is to present Peru's past and present to better tell the story of South American sound experimentation and the avant-garde. They have also hosted a Buh Records Festival, featuring audiovisual presentations and a homage to Walter Smetak.

The label has received funding from Peru's ministry of culture, such as for 2021's El fabuloso sonido de Andrés Vargas Pinedo: una colección de música popular amazónica (1966-1974), a compilation featuring the work of flautist Andrés Vargas Pinedo.

Their first releases were distributed on CD-R, but later moved to vinyl, cassette tape, and CD.

The Wire magazine has highlighted their work often, and was featured across four pages in their October 2018 issue.
