= Grecian Coffee House =

Coordinates: 51.5129°N 0.1124°W

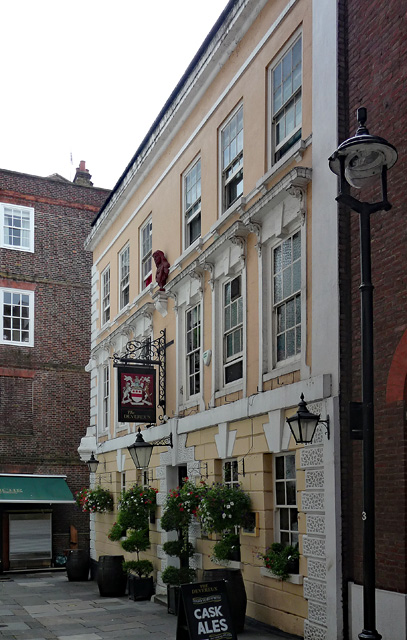
- Interactive map of Grecian Coffee House

Restaurant information
- Previous owner: George Constantine
- Location: London, United Kingdom

The Grecian Coffee House was a coffee house, first established in about 1665 at Wapping Old Stairs in London, United Kingdom, by a Greek former mariner called George Constantine.

== History ==
The enterprise proved a success and, by 1677, Constantine had been able to move his premises to a more central location in Devereux Court, off Fleet Street. In the 1690s, the Grecian Coffee House was the favoured meeting place of the Commonwealthmen, a group of Radical Whigs that included John Trenchard, Andrew Fletcher and Matthew Tindal. In the early years of the eighteenth century, it was frequented by members of the Royal Society, including Sir Isaac Newton, Sir Hans Sloane, Edmund Halley and James Douglas, and the poet and statesman, Joseph Addison.

Classical scholars were also said to congregate there, and on one occasion, two of them fought a duel in the street outside because they fell out over where to position the accent on an Ancient Greek word.

In the 1760s and 1770s it was a favourite haunt of Irish law students, especially "the Templers", those young Irishmen who were studying at the Middle Temple. They were attracted there by the presence of the poet and playwright Oliver Goldsmith, who "delighted to entertain his friends there". These friends included the future statesman Henry Grattan.

The Grecian was the favourite coffee-house in London of the renowned Shakespearean scholar Edmond Malone. In April 1776, he wrote his father a letter from there, boasting "I am at present writing in a coffee-house, in the midst of so much noise and bustle—the celebrated anti-Sejanus (Mr. Scott) on one side and Mr. [Charles] Macklin [the actor] on the other—that I can't add anything more at present."

By 1803, the Grecian was no longer the meeting place of radicals, scholars and scientists but of lawyers and it finally closed in 1843, becoming a pub. The site is now occupied by The Devereux public house and is a Grade II listed building.
