= Devereux Court =

Street in the City of Westminster

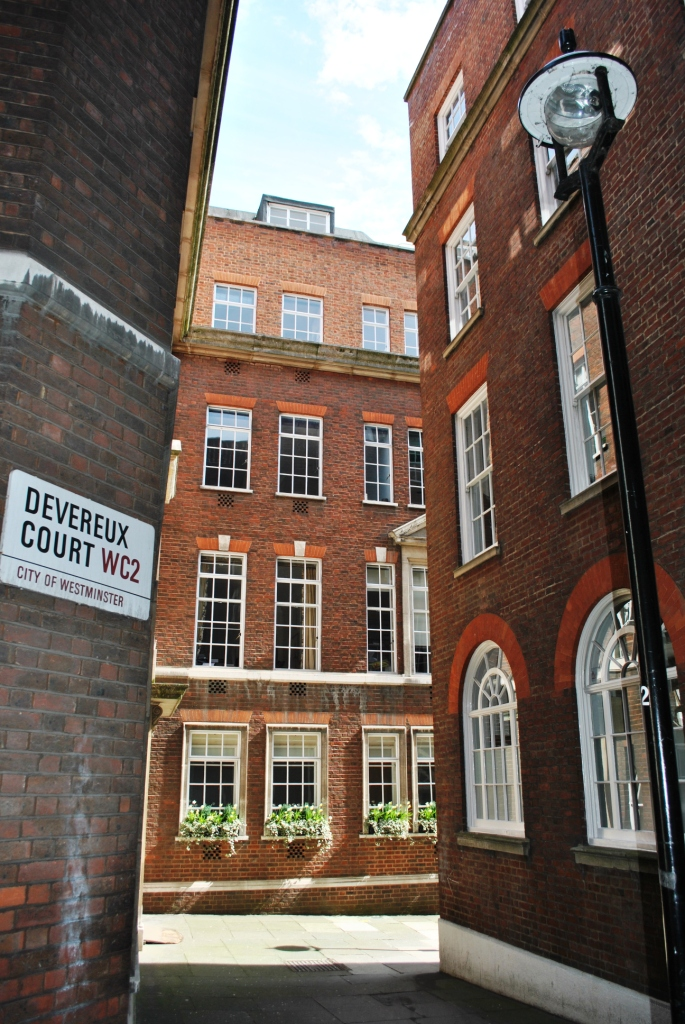
- Street sign of Devereux Court

- Location within Greater London
- Westminster
- Region: London
- Country: England
- Sovereign state: United Kingdom
- Postcode district: WC2R
- Police: Metropolitan
- Fire: London
- Ambulance: London
- UK Parliament: Cities of London and Westminster
- London Assembly: West Central

Devereux Court, a narrow street in the City of Westminster, lies just south of the Strand, London and east of Essex Street, London. The fully pedestrianised lane is lined with well-preserved 17th-century buildings, and its distinctive dog-leg layout has remained largely unchanged since its development in the 1670s on the grounds of Essex House.

== History ==
Devereux Court, situated on the former grounds of the grand Essex House, was previously the site of the Outer Temple, originally owned by the Knights Templar. It was named after Robert Devereux, the 2nd Earl of Essex. Devereux was a beloved favourite of Queen Elizabeth I. However, he later led an unsuccessful uprising against her, resulting in a siege of Essex House. Following changes in ownership, the developer Nicholas Barbon established Essex Street and Devereux Court on the land in 1675 and 1680.

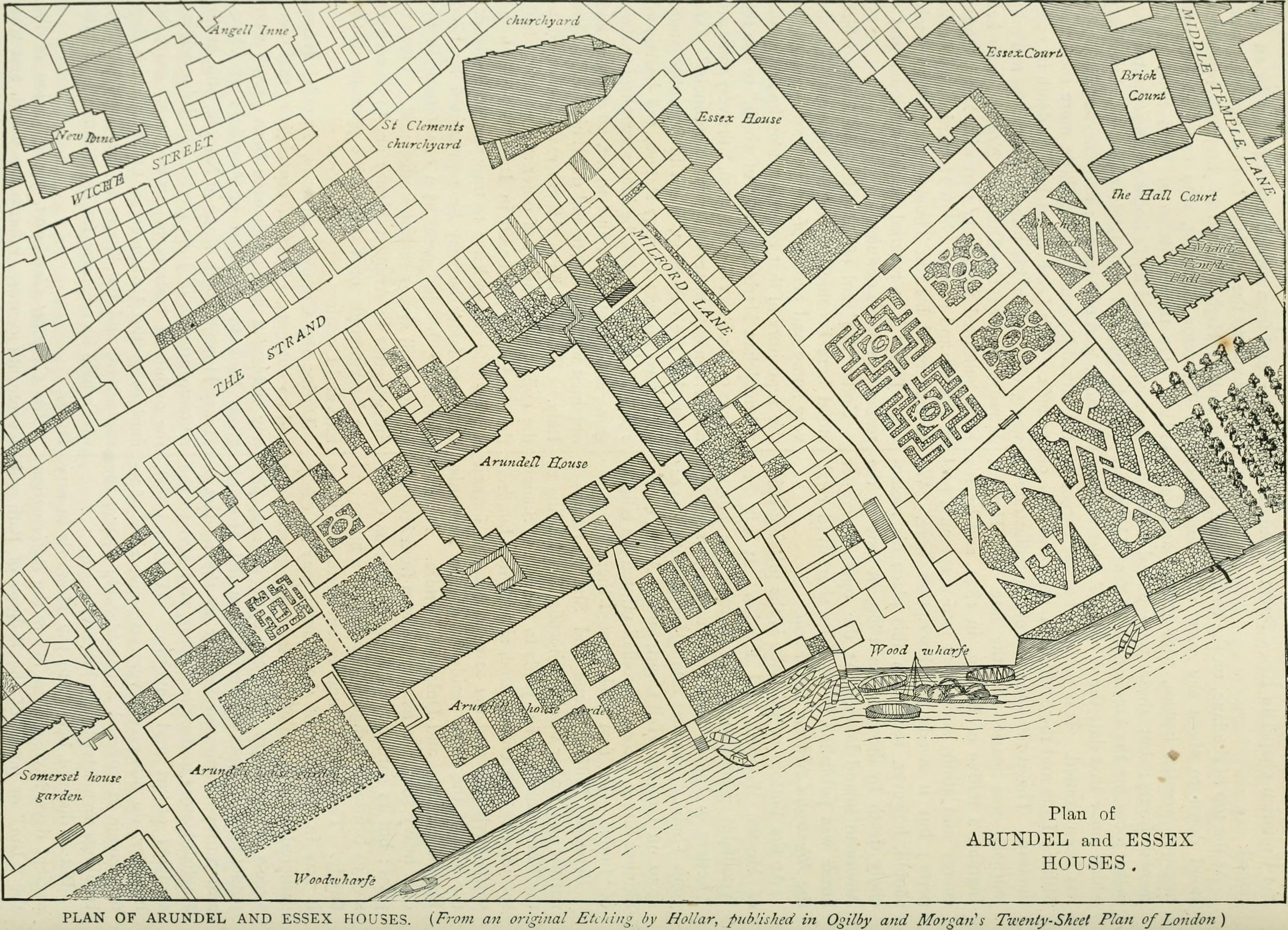
The plan of Arundel and Essex Houses shows the approximate footprint of present-day Devereux Court behind Essex House. Four ornate gardens appear between the lane and the river, indicating an approach from the river in the 1677 map.

During the 18th century and until 1843, the establishment operated as the Grecian Coffee House, one of London’s most prominent coffee houses, frequented by figures such as Oliver Goldsmith and Sir Richard Steele, founder of The Tatler. A public house now stands partially on the site of Devereux’s London residence, with a stone bust on its façade commemorating him.

As described by Robert Seymour in 1735, "It is a large Place with good Houses, and by Reason of its Vicinity to the Temple london, has a good Resort, consisting of Public Houses, and noted Coffee Houses; from this Court is a Passage into Essex-street".

Although the Twining family owned residences in other locations, several family members, including Richard Twining, were born in Devereux Court. Richard Twining, born in 1749 at Devereux Court, was one of Daniel Twining's three sons.

== Buildings ==
Devereux Court is home to Devereux Chambers and three historic public houses: The George, The Devereux, and The Edgar Wallace (formerly The Essex Head).

Last Temple House, the sole surviving private residence in Temple, London, stands on the former site of Essex House.

In the 17th century, the Temple area was developed by Nicholas Barbon, who constructed many of its early residential buildings. Over time, most of these houses, estimated at around 98%, were converted into commercial premises and multi-occupancy buildings. Today, Last Temple House remains the only private residence in the Temple precinct.

== Civic Society ==
The Temple Society is a non-profit organisation dedicated to restoring the western boundary of Temple, London. Since 2023, it has been working to enhance and restore the public realm of Devereux Court.
