= The Devereux =

Pub in Devereux Court, Strand, London

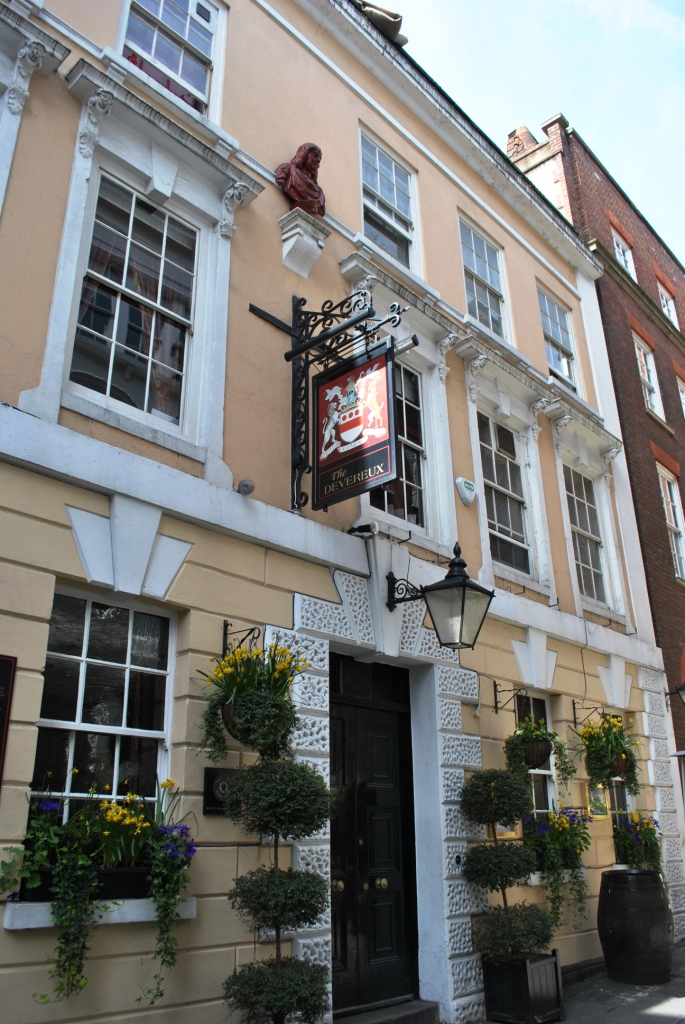
- The Devereux, 2013
- Location: 20 Devereux Court, off Essex Street, London WC2
- Coordinates: 51°30′46.28″N 0°6′45.2″W
- Built: c. 1676

Listed Building – Grade II
- Official name: 20, DEVEREUX COURT
- Designated: 14-Jan-1970
- Reference no.: 1066888

The Devereux is a pub at No. 20 Devereux Court, off Essex Street, London WC2.

It is a Grade II listed building that was built in about 1676 as the Grecian Coffee House. It was refurbished as a pub in 1843.
