= Luciferianism =

Belief system that venerates Lucifer

The sigil of Lucifer

Luciferianism is a belief system that venerates the essential characteristics that are attributed to Lucifer, the name of various mythological and religious figures associated with the planet Venus. The tradition usually reveres Lucifer not as the Devil, but as a destroyer, a guardian, liberator, light bringer or guiding spirit to darkness, or even the true god. According to Ethan Doyle White in Encyclopædia Britannica, among those who "called themselves Satanists or Luciferians", some insist that Lucifer is an entity separate from Satan, while others maintain "the two names as synonyms for the same being".

== Etymology ==
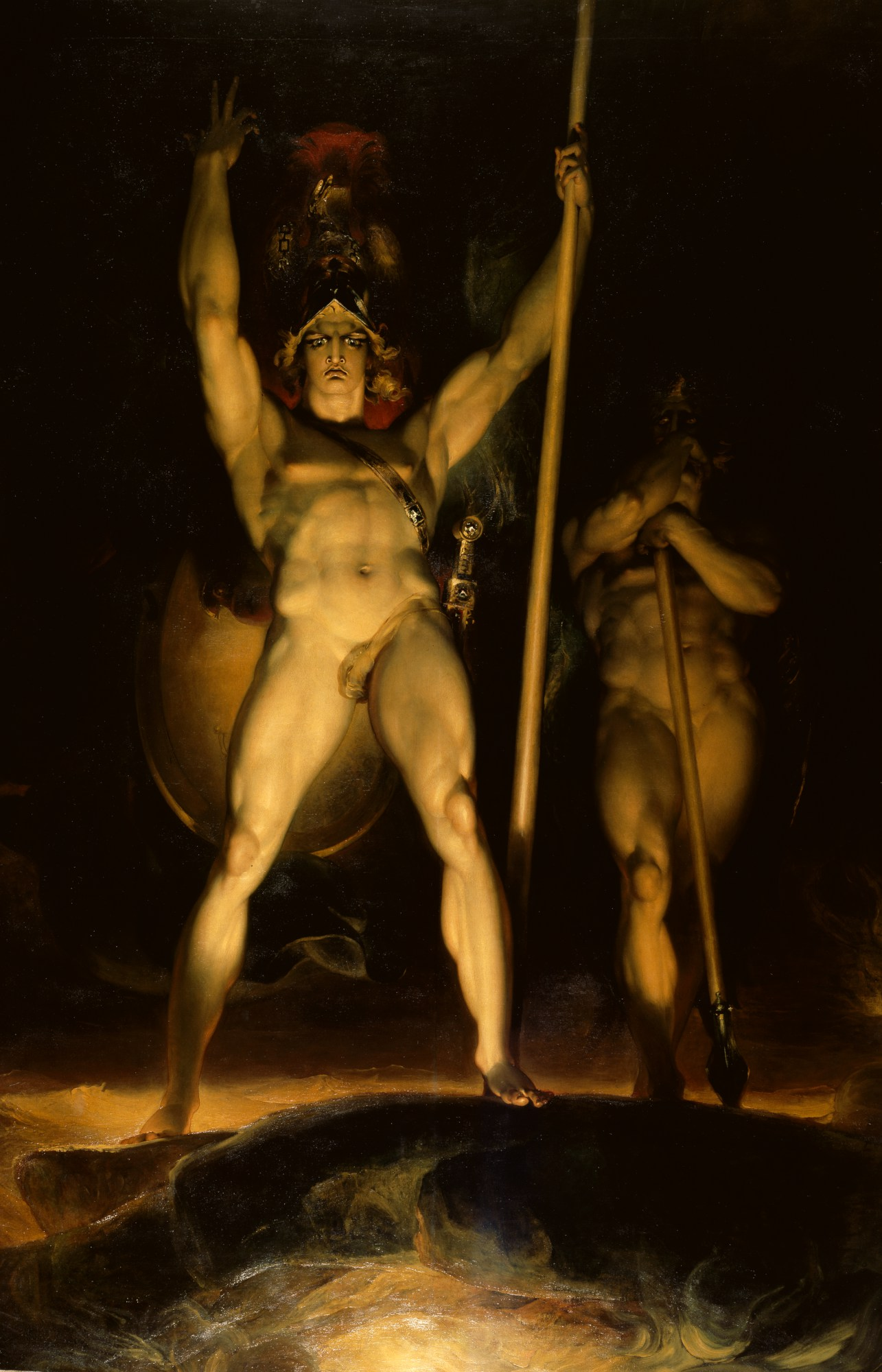
Illustration depicting Lucifer summoning his Legions by Thomas Lawrence, 1796–1797

The word Lucifer is taken from the Latin Vulgate, which translates הֵילֵל as lucifer. The Biblical Hebrew word הֵילֵל, which occurs only once in the Hebrew Bible, has been transliterated as hêlêl, or heylel. The Septuagint renders הֵילֵל in Greek as ἑωσφόρος (heōsphoros), a name—literally "bringer of dawn"—for the so-called morning star.

In Christian and Jewish exegesis of Isaiah 14, Nebuchadnezzar II, who conquered Jerusalem in 587 BCE, is condemned in a prophecy by Isaiah and called the "Morning Star" (i.e., the planet Venus). The Hebrew text in this chapter says, הֵילֵל בֶּן-שָׁחַר (Helel ben Shachar, "shining one, son of dawn"). Helel ben Shahar may refer to the Morning Star, but the text of Isaiah 14 gives no indication that Helel was a star or planet. Later Christian tradition came to use the Latin word for "morning star", lucifer, as a proper name ("Lucifer") for the Devil—as he was before his fall. As a result, Lucifer has become a by-word for Satan or "the Devil" in Christianity and popular Western literature, as in Dante Alighieri's Inferno, Joost van den Vondel's Lucifer, and John Milton's 1667 Paradise Lost. However, the Latin word never came to be used exclusively, as in English, in this way. It was also applied to others, including Jesus. The image of a morning star fallen from the sky is generally believed among bible scholar to have a parallel in Canaanite mythology.

== History ==
=== Medieval ===
The Luciferian label—in the sense of Lucifer-worshipper—was first used in the Gesta Treverorum in 1231 for a religious circle led by a woman named Lucardis (Luckhardis). It was said that in private she lamented the fall of Lucifer (Satan) and yearned for his restoration to heavenly rule. The sect was exposed by the Papal Inquisition. In 1234, Pope Gregory IX issued the bull Vox in Rama calling for a crusade against the Stedinger, who were accused of Luciferianism. The bull contains a detailed description of supposed rites and beliefs. This description was repeated and occasionally expanded in the following centuries, but "modern historiography agrees on their entirely fictitious nature". The actual identity of the heretics accused of Luciferianism is often difficult to ascertain. Those of the 13th-century Rhineland appear to have been Cathars (Alexander Patschovsky) or a distinct off-shoot of the Cathars (Piotr Czarnecki).

In the 14th century, the term Luciferians was applied to what appear to have been Waldensians. They were persecuted under the Luciferian label in Schweidnitz in 1315 and in Angermünde in 1336. In 1392–1394, when some four hundred Luciferians from Brandenburg and Pomerania were brought before the inquisitor Peter Zwicker, he exonerated them of devil-worship and correctly identified them as Waldensians. At the same time, the inquisitor Antonio da Settimo in Piedmont believed the local Waldensians to be Luciferians.

=== Modern ===
Moses Harman's Lucifer The Light-Bearer was an individualist anarchist journal published in the United States in the late 19th and early 20th centuries. It has been reported that "the title was selected, stated Harman, because it expressed the paper's mission. Lucifer, the name given to the morning star by the people of the ancient world, served as the symbol of the publication and represented the ushering in of a new day. He declared that freethinkers had sought to redeem and glorify the name Lucifer while theologians cursed him as the prince of the fallen angels. Harman suggested that Lucifer would take on the role of an educator. 'The God of the Bible doomed mankind to perpetual ignorance,' wrote Harman, 'and [people] would never have known Good from Evil if Lucifer had not told them how to become as wise as the gods themselves.'"

Lucifer was a publication edited by the influential occultist Helena Blavatsky. The journal was first published by Blavatsky. From 1889 until Blavatsky's death in May 1891, Annie Besant was a co-editor. Rudolf Steiner's writings, which formed the basis for anthroposophy, characterised Lucifer as a spiritual opposite to Ahriman, with Christ between the two forces, mediating a balanced path for humanity. Lucifer represents an intellectual, imaginative and otherworldly force which might be associated with visions, subjectivity, psychosis and fantasy. He associated Lucifer with the religious and philosophical cultures of Egypt, Rome, and Greece. Steiner believed that Lucifer, as a supersensible Being, had incarnated in China about 3000 years before the birth of Christ.

In what is known as the Taxil hoax, Léo Taxil (1854–1907) claimed that Freemasonry is associated with worshipping Lucifer. He alleged that leading Freemason Albert Pike had addressed "[t]he 23 Supreme Confederated Councils of the world" (an invention of Taxil), instructing them that Lucifer was God, and was in opposition to the evil god Adonai. Supporters of Freemasonry contend that, when Albert Pike and other Masonic scholars spoke about the "Luciferian path" or the "energies of Lucifer", they were referring to the Morning Star, the light bearer, the search for light, the very antithesis of dark, Satanic evil. Taxil promoted a book by Diana Vaughan (actually written by himself, as he later confessed publicly) that purported to reveal a highly secret ruling body called the Palladium, which controlled the organization and had a Satanic agenda. As described by Freemasonry Disclosed in 1897:

With frightening cynicism, the miserable person we shall not name here [Taxil] declared before an assembly especially convened for him that for twelve years he had prepared and carried out to the end the most sacrilegious of hoaxes. We have always been careful to publish special articles concerning Palladism and Diana Vaughan. We are now giving in this issue a complete list of these articles, which can now be considered as not having existed.

Taxil's work and Pike's address continue to be quoted by anti-Masonic groups.

In Devil-Worship in France, Arthur Edward Waite compared Taxil's work to what today would be called a tabloid story, replete with logical and factual inconsistencies.

Madeline Montalban was an English astrologer and witch. She co-founded the esoteric organisation known as the Order of the Morning Star (OMS), through which she propagated her own form of Luciferianism. In 1952, she met Nicholas Heron, with whom she entered into a relationship. An engraver, photographer, and former journalist for the Brighton Argus, he shared her interest in the occult and together they developed a magical system based upon Luciferianism, the veneration of the deity Lucifer, or Lumiel, whom they considered to be a benevolent angelic deity. In 1956, they founded the Order of the Morning Star, or Ordo Stella Matutina (OSM), propagating it through a correspondence course. The couple sent out lessons to those who paid the necessary fees over a series of weeks, eventually leading to the twelfth lesson, which contained The Book of Lumiel, a short work written by Montalban that documented her understanding of Lumiel, or Lucifer, and his involvement with humankind. The couple initially lived together in Torrington Place, London, from where they ran the course; but in 1961 moved to the coastal town of Southsea in Hampshire, where there was greater room for Heron's engraving equipment.

=== Contemporary ===
In Anton LaVey's The Satanic Bible, Lucifer is one of the four crown princes of hell, particularly that of the East, the "lord of the air", and is described as the bringer of light, the morning star, intellectualism, and enlightenment. The title "lord of the air" is based upon Ephesians 2:2, which uses the phrase "prince of the power of the air'" to refer to Satan.

In Rules for Radicals (his final work, published in 1971 one year before his death), the prominent American community organizer and writer Saul Alinsky wrote at the end of his personal acknowledgements:

Lest we forget at least an over-the-shoulder acknowledgment to the very first radical: from all our legends, mythology, and history (and who is to know where mythology leaves off and history begins or which is which), the first radical known to man who rebelled against the establishment and did it so effectively that he at least won his own kingdom – Lucifer.

Author Michael W. Ford has written on Lucifer as a "mask" of the adversary, a motivator and illuminating force of the mind and subconscious.

== Notable organizations ==
=== Fraternitas Saturni ===
Fraternitas Saturni (lat.: "Brotherhood of Saturn") is a German magical order, founded in 1926 by Eugen Grosche a.k.a. Gregor A. Gregorius and four others. It is one of the oldest continuously running magical groups in Germany. The lodge is, as Gregorius states, "concerned with the study of esotericism, mysticism, and magic in the cosmic sense". The emphasis of the FS lies more on astrological and Luciferian teachings, rather than on Qabalah and Tarot compared to other Western magical orders founded in the early 20th century. Because of its unique approach to modern occultism, the FS is considered by many modern authors to be the most influential German magical order. According to Stephen Flowers, Fraternitas Saturni (FS) "is (or was) the most unabashedly Luciferian organization in the modern Western occult revival".

=== Assembly of Light Bearers ===
The Assembly of Light Bearers (ALB), formerly known as the Greater Church of Lucifer (GCoL), is a Luciferian organization founded by Michael W. Ford in 2013.

In 2014, Luciferians founded a worldwide organization for Luciferians from Houston, Texas, known as the Greater Church of Lucifer (GCoL) under the leadership of Michael W. Ford, Hopemarie Ford and Jeremy Crow, founder of the Luciferian Research Society. Michael W. Ford and his wife have described their religion as "Luciferian witchcraft".

In 2015, the GCoL opened a brick and mortar church located in Old Town Spring, Texas, with several dozen members. Over a hundred local residents, mainly Catholic, protested the opening of the church. The town of Old Town Spring suffered from a boycott in response to the church, The church itself had windows smashed and its roof damaged after someone sawed off the branch of a 200-year-old pecan tree hanging over the church in the middle of the night. Ford stated that The Greater Church of Lucifer was forced to shut down one year later because their landlord refused to renew their lease after receiving death threats.

== See also ==
- Lucis Trust
- Lucifer and Prometheus
- Demonology
- Satanism
