= Twining (surname) =

Twining is a surname. Notable people with the surname include:

- Dick Twining (1889–1979), English cricketer
- Edward Twining (1899–1967), British diplomat and author
- Elizabeth Twining (1805–1889), English botanical illustrator
- Ernest W. Twining (1875–1956), English modelmaker, artist, and engineer
- James Twining (born 1972), British author of thriller novels
- Louisa Twining (1820–1912), social reformer
- Luella Twining (1871–1939), Labor activist
- Mary Twining (1726-1804), tea merchant, mother of Richard Twining
- Merrill B. Twining (1902–1996), American Marine Corps general
- Nathan Crook Twining (1869–1924), American Navy admiral
- Nathan Farragut Twining (1897–1982), American Air Force general, Air Force Chief of Staff; Chairman Joint Chiefs of Staff 1957–1960
- Richard Twining (1749–1824), tea merchant
- Thomas Twining (merchant) (1675–1741), English merchant and founder of the Twinings tea company
- Thomas Twining (scholar) (1735–1804), English classical scholar
- Twink Twining (1894–1973), American baseball player
- William Twining (military physician) (1790–1835), British military physician
- William Twining (born 1934), English professor of law
- Charles H. Twining (born 1940), career US Diplomat
