= Thomas Twining =

Thomas Twining may refer to:

- Thomas Twining (merchant) (1675–1741), English merchant and founder of the Twinings tea company
- Thomas Twining (scholar) (1735–1804), English scholar and classicist, grandson of the above

== See also ==
- Twining (surname)
