= Richard Twining =

Richard Twining may refer to:

- Richard Twining (tea merchant, born 1749) (1749–1824), English merchant, director of the East India Company, and the head of Twinings
- Richard Twining (tea merchant, born 1772) (1772–1857), his son, English merchant, director of the East India Company, and the head of Twinings
- Richard Twining (cricketer), English cricketer
