= John Aldred Twining =

British tea merchant (1785 - 1855)

John Aldred Twining (1785–1855) was a British tea merchant and a partner in Twinings, the London tea merchants. He was the son of Richard Twining (1749–1824), a director of the East India Company, and the head of Twinings the London tea merchants.

== Life ==
Twining was born in 1785. He was the son of Richard Twining (1749 – 1824). Twining joined his father and brother Richard Twining (1772–1857) in the family tea business, of which he became a partner in 1811. In 1825, he founded Twinings Bank, to which his family moved their accounts from Hoare's Bank of Fleet Street, which had kept their accounts since 1725. The Twinings Bank merged with Lloyds Bank in 1892.

John Aldred Twining moved to "Kirkdale" on Clapham Common around 1826, where he resided to 1845. He died in 1855. He is buried at Kensal Green Cemetery, where his brother, Richard Twining (1772–1857), was subsequently buried.

== Family ==
Twining married in 1807 Emma Haynes, daughter of Mr. Haynes of Cornhill. His sister Elizabeth Twining exhibited portraits of their family at the Royal Academy in 1831. Of their children:

- Samuel Harvey Twining, eldest son, in 1848 married Rosa Herring, daughter of William Herring of Hethersett Hall, Norfolk.
- The Rev. James Twining, second son, in 1854 then of Holy Trinity Twickenham, married Mary Elizabeth Bevan, daughter of the late Rev. Thomas Bevan, formerly incumbent of Holy Trinity.
- Frederick Twining, third son, in 1855 built a house in Cleggan, County Galway, and married Elizabeth Catharine Nelson, daughter of A. C. Nelson.
