= Workhouse infirmary =

Workhouse infirmaries were established in the nineteenth century in England. They developed from the Workhouse and were run under the Poor law regime.

The 1832 Royal Commission into the Operation of the Poor Laws recommended separate workhouses for the aged and infirm. Clause 45 of the Poor Law Amendment Act 1834 established that lunatics could not be held in a workhouse for more than a fortnight.

== 1840s–1870 ==
Workhouse residents were provided with free medical care, which was not available to those outside. Every Poor Law Union had a medical officer. Most workhouses had a small infirmary block, but nursing was in the hands of the other inmates, most of whom could not read.

"If the pauper is always promptly attended by a skilful and well qualified medical practitioner ... if the patient be furnished with all the cordials and stimulants which may promote his recovery: it cannot be denied that his condition in these respects is better than that of the needy and industrious ratepayer who has neither the money nor the influence to secure prompt and careful attendance."

Where workhouses had been designed for the indigent, by the late 1840s most workhouses outside London and the larger provincial towns housed only "the incapable, elderly and sick". Standards of care were increasingly criticised:

"…I have visited many prisons and lunatic asylums, not only in England, but in France, and Germany. A single English workhouse contains more that justly calls for condemnation than is found in the very worst prisons or public lunatic asylums that I have seen. The workhouse, as now organised, is a reproach and disgrace to England; nothing corresponding to it is found throughout the whole continent of Europe. In France, the medical patients of our workhouses would be found in ‘hopitaux’; the infirm aged poor would be in ‘hospices’; and the blind, the idiot, the lunatic, the bastard child and the vagrant would similarly be placed in an appropriate but separate establishment. With us, a common malebolge is provided for them all. . . . It is at once shocking to every principle of reason and every feeling of humanity that all these varied forms of wretchedness should thus be crowded together into one common abode; that no attempt should be made by law. . . to provide appropriate places for the relief of each." (1852)

The Workhouse Visiting Society was set up in 1858 exposed the poor standards of nursing care.

The 1867 report to Gathorne Hardy by Uvedale Corbett and Dr. W. O. Markham, after the scandal around the death of Timothy Daly, a resident of Holborn Workhouse Infirmary, recommended that:

"The infirmary should be separated from the rest of the workhouse and under independent management, and that the treatment of sick paupers should be carried out under different principles from those to which the able-bodied were subject." and that "The nursing and the general management of the infirmary should be under the charge of a matron with some previous hospital training. Qualified nurses should take charge of the sick, the more menial duties being carried out by pauper nurses under their supervision. There should be one qualified nurse for every fifty patients by day and for every hundred at night. Drug administration should not be left to pauper nurses."

After the Metropolitan Poor Act 1867 (30 & 31 Vict. c. 6) more infirmaries were built in and around London. The act permitted the employment of probationary nurses who were trained for a year in the sick asylums. These nurses gradually began to replace the employment of untrained paupers who had provided what little nursing care there was. In 1869 there were about 50,000 sick paupers in workhouses. An inspector observed that the Southwark workhouse "does not meet the requirements of medical science, nor am I able to suggest any arrangements which would in the least enable it to do so". By the middle of the 19th century, there was a growing realisation that the purpose of the workhouse was no longer solely or even chiefly to act as a deterrent to the able-bodied poor, and the first generation of buildings was widely considered to be inadequate. About 150 new workhouses were built mainly in London, Lancashire and Yorkshire between 1840 and 1875. These new buildings often had long corridors with separate wards leading off for men, women and children.

== 1871–1900 ==
Responsibility for administration of the Poor Law passed to the Local Government Board in 1871, and the emphasis shifted from the workhouse as "a receptacle for the helpless poor" to its role in the care of the sick and helpless. The Diseases Prevention (Metropolis) Act 1883 allowed workhouse infirmaries to offer treatment to non-paupers as well as inmates, and by the beginning of the 20th century some infirmaries were even able to operate as private hospitals. By the end of the century only about 20 per cent admitted to workhouses were unemployed or destitute, but about 30 per cent of the population over 70 were in workhouses.

== 1900–1930 ==
In 1901 there were 3,170 paid nurses employed in workhouses, with about 2,000 probationers - about one nurse for 20 patients. They normally worked a 70 hour week with two weeks paid holiday a year. In 1911 there were more than 100,000 sick in workhouses.

The Royal Commission of 1905 reported that workhouses were unsuited to deal with the different categories of resident they had traditionally housed, and recommended that specialised institutions for each class of pauper should be established, in which they could be treated appropriately by properly trained staff. The "deterrent" workhouses were in future to be reserved for "incorrigibles such as drunkards, idlers and tramps". The Local Government Act 1929 gave local authorities the power to take over workhouse infirmaries as municipal hospitals, although outside London few did so. The workhouse system was abolished in the UK by the same Act on 1 April 1930, but many workhouses, renamed Public Assistance Institutions, continued under the control of local county councils.

== 1930–1948 ==
Even in 1939 there were still almost 100,000 people accommodated in the former workhouses, 5,629 of whom were children. It was not until the 1948 National Assistance Act that the last vestiges of the Poor Law disappeared, and with them the workhouses. Many of the buildings were converted into old folks' homes run by local authorities; slightly more than 50 per cent of local authority accommodation for the elderly was provided in former workhouses in 1960. Camberwell workhouse (in Peckham, South London) continued until 1985 as a shelter for more than 1000 homeless men, operated by the Department of Health and Social Security and renamed a resettlement centre. Southwell workhouse, now a museum, was used to provide temporary accommodation for mothers and children until the early 1990s.

In 1937 there were about 27,000 female nurses and 30,000 probationers working in the Poor law and municipal hospitals.

== See also ==
Category:Poor law infirmaries

- History of public health in the United Kingdom#Hospitals
