= Dial House, Twickenham =

18th-century house in Twickenham, London

Coordinates: 51.4470°N 0.3245°W

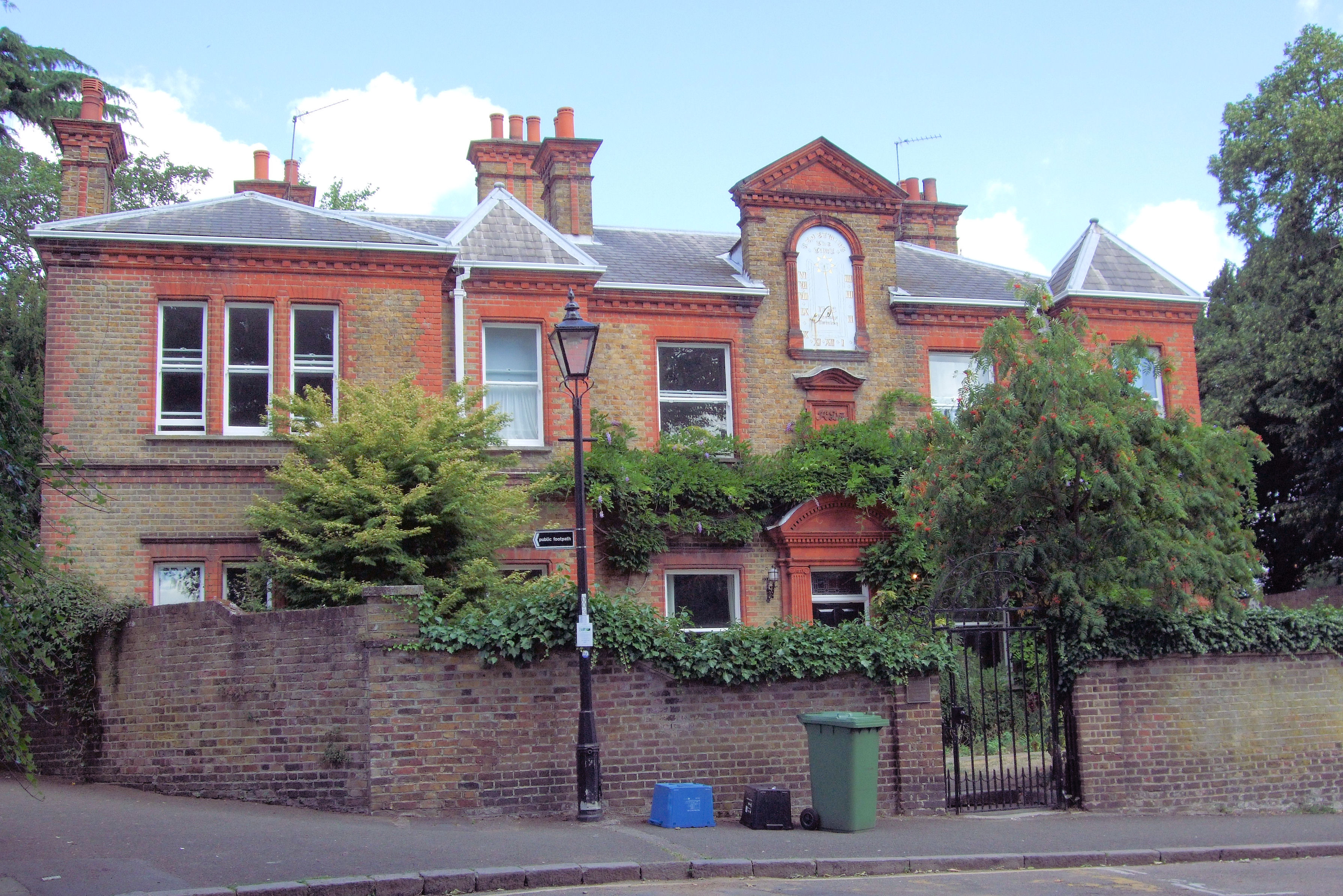
The house

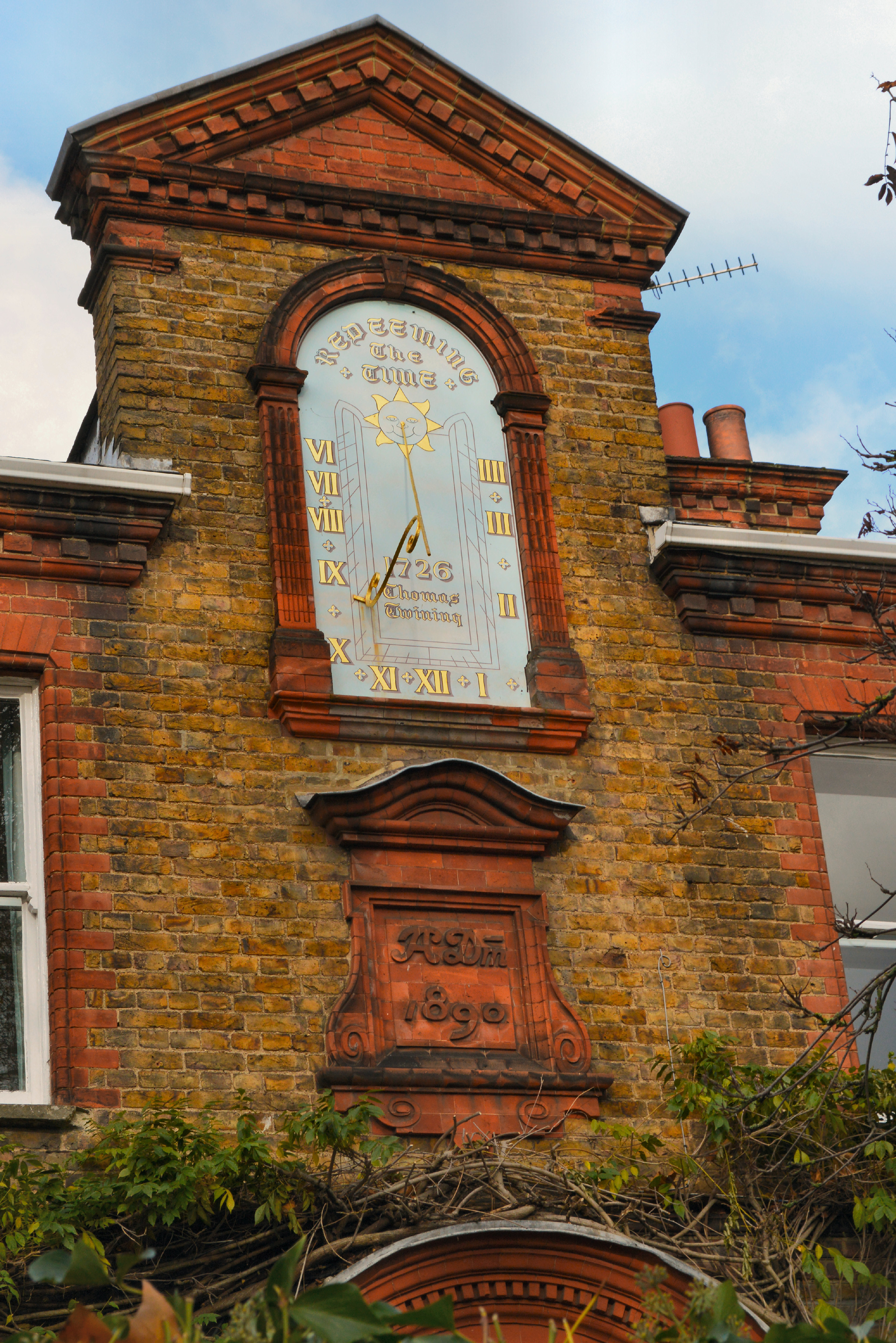
The sundial

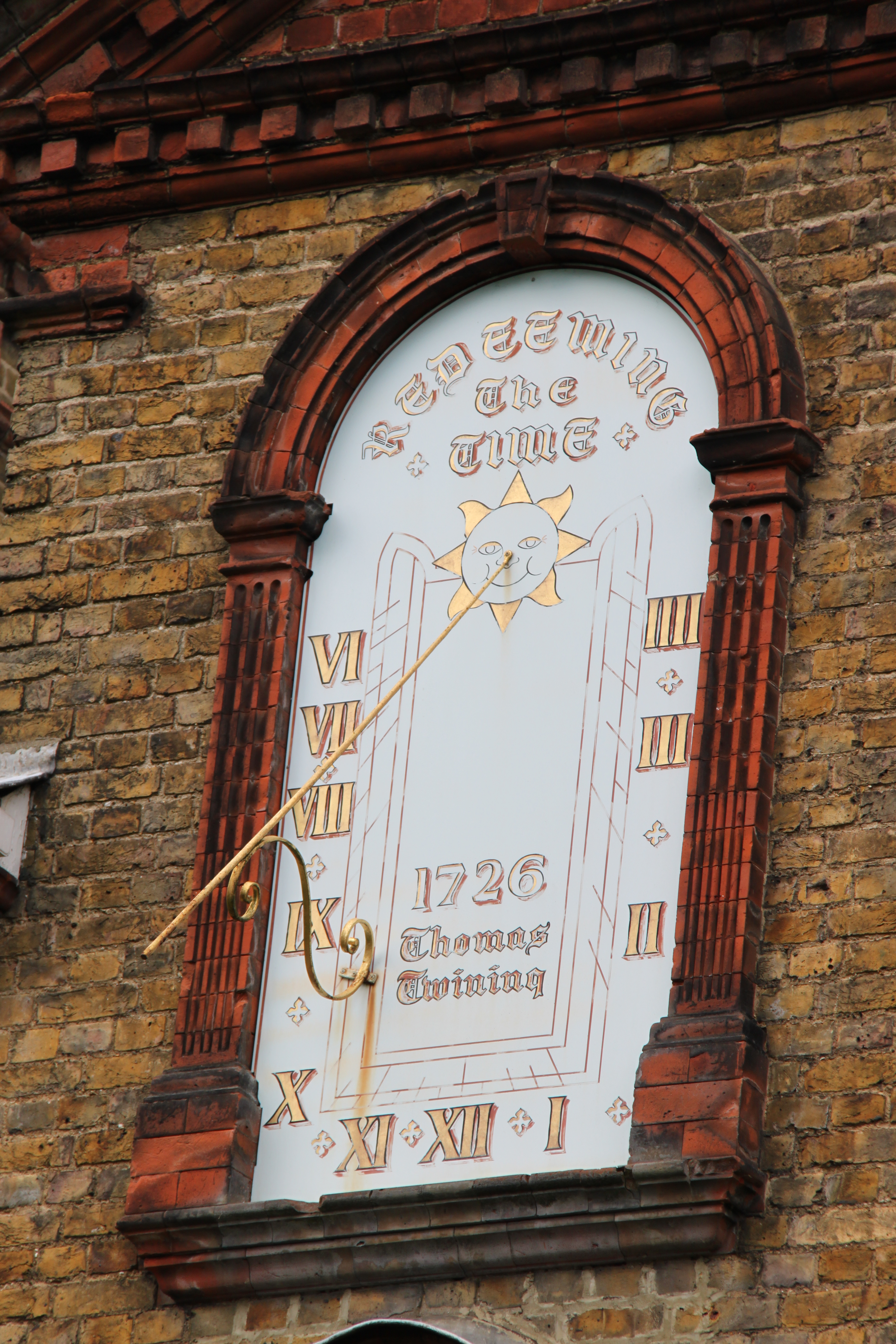
Closer view of the sundial

Dial House, Twickenham is an 18th-century house next door to St Mary's Church, Twickenham. In about 1722, the tea merchant Thomas Twining (1675–1741) bought the property on the site, where he either rebuilt or converted and extended the buildings already there. The façade of the house has a sundial, dated 1726, which is possibly the year in which the new building was finished.

Dial House remained in the Twining family for many years after Thomas's death: the last member of the family to live there was the botanical illustrator Elizabeth Twining (1805–1889), who resided there from 1866, after the death of her mother, until her own death in 1889. Subsequently the house was donated to the parish of Twickenham by her brother, Richard Twining, as a replacement for the existing vicarage, because the latter was in a condition of disrepair. Dial House has continued to belong to the Church of England: it is now used as the official residence and office of the Bishop of Kensington.
