= Uvedale =

Uvedale is a given name and a surname. Notable people with the name include:

Forename

- Uvedale Price (1747–1829), Herefordshire landowner who was at the heart of the 'Picturesque debate' of the 1790s
- Uvedale Shobdon Corbett DSO (1909–2005), British soldier, politician and businessman
- Uvedale Tomkins Price (1685–1764), British Member of Parliament
- Uvedale Corbett Junior Poor Law Inspector
- Sir Uvedale Corbet, 3rd Baronet (1668–1701)

Surname

- Edmund Uvedale (disambiguation), more than one person
- Robert Uvedale (1642–1722), English teacher and horticulturist
- William Uvedale (c. 1581 – 1652), English politician
