= Mary Twining =

British business executive

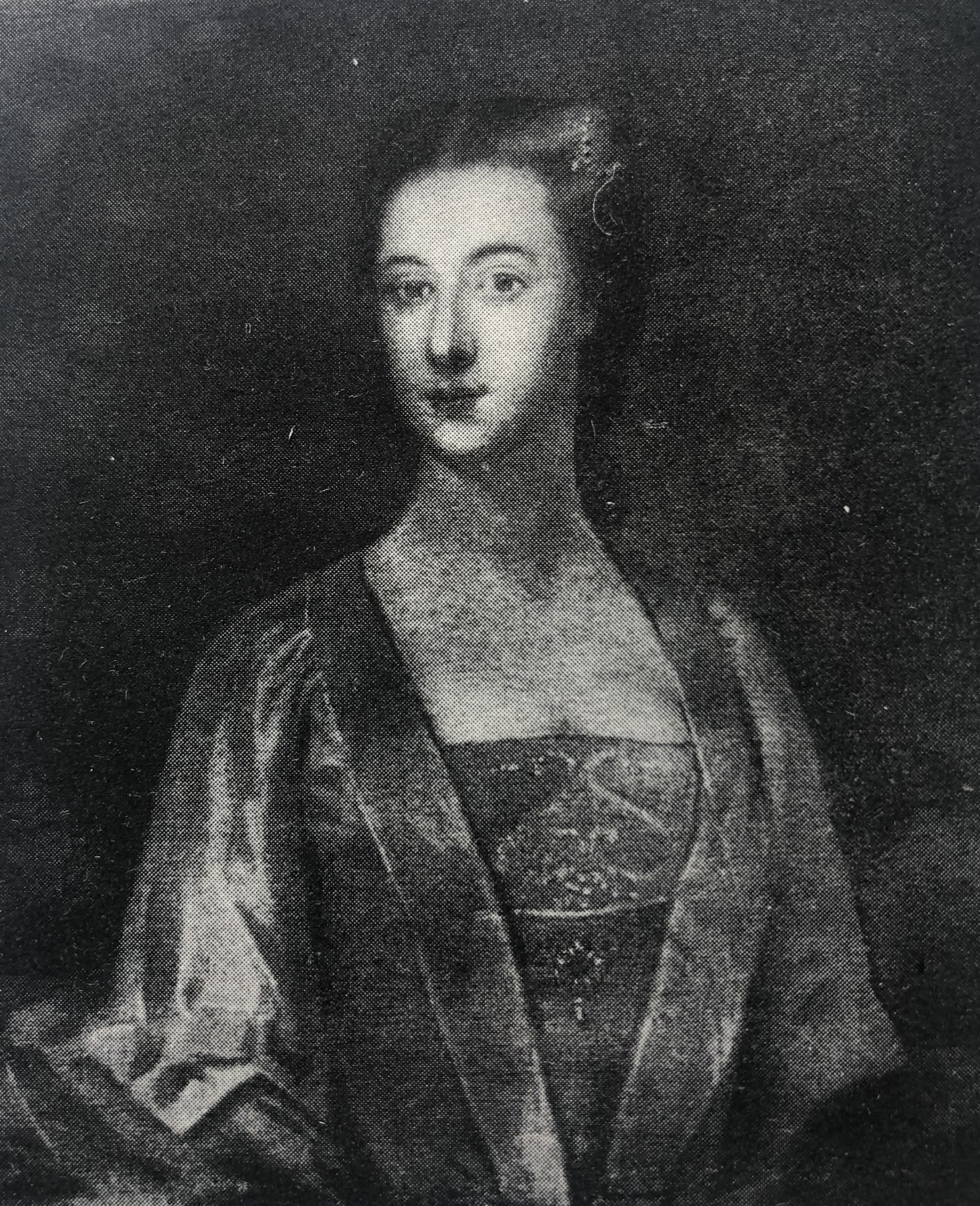
Portrait of Mary Twining, artist unknown

Mary Twining (1726–1804), née Little, led Twinings, the tea company, from 1763 to 1782, after the death of her husband, Daniel Twining. Her sons, Richard Twining and John Twining, eventually took over the company from her. Today, Twinings still exists and is a recognized, global brand.

== Life and death ==
Mary Little was born on 9 August 1726 in Wisbech, England, and was the eldest daughter of Richard Little Esq., a merchant. She married Daniel Twining in 1745, two years after he lost his first wife, Ann March. Along with a son from his first marriage, Thomas Twining, they had three sons together, Daniel, Richard, and John. Daniel (1748-1765) was supposedly killed by a blow to the head from a cricket ball while studying at Eton College.

Mary died in 1804, at the age of 78.

=== Twinings ===
Prior to Daniel Twining's sudden death in 1762, he ran the family business created by his father, Thomas Twining, from 1741 until 1753 by himself. In 1753 he took on a business partner named Nathaniel Carter, who was also his nephew.

When Daniel died in 1762, leaving Mary with his four sons to care for, Carter left the business soon after in 1763. Mary then took over running the business (then known as Twining's with an apostrophe) from 1763 until 1782. Starting in 1763, the London Directories described the business as, “Mary Twining. Tea Warehouse, Devereux Court, Strand.”

In an excerpt from Alexander Meyrick Broadley's work on Twinings, he states:

“Between [Daniel’s death] and 1782, the whole conduct of the affairs of the ‘Golden Lyon’ remained in the capable hands of Mary Twining, his widow, the style of the firm in 1778 (or possibly a little earlier) being ‘Mary Twining & Son,’ although in 1763 she must have had sole control, since Kent’s London Director of that date gives ‘Mary Twining, Tea Warehouse, Devereaux Court, Strand.' She was succeeded by this son, Richard, who was joined by his brother John."

Despite women’s typically lower or even non-existent status in business in the eighteenth century, Mary Twining managed and ran the affairs of the company in great form. Under her leadership, Twinings' global exports grew and the business remained stable, despite the taxation of tea rising to 119 percent during this period.

The cost of tea in the late eighteenth century, in part due to the high import taxes, made it affordable to very few people in England. Tea smuggling from Holland or France to England ensued as a result, and since smugglers risked execution to perform these duties, they typically diluted the tea leaves by 100 percent in order to maximize their profit value, thereby lessening the tea quality.

In addition, shortly after Mary took the reins of the company, the American Revolution began in 1765 in part due to perceived heavy taxation of imported goods on the American colonies from England. Skirmishes like the Boston Tea Party of 1773 exhibited direct objection to the taxation of tea itself. The 18-year war ultimately cost England a fortune, plunged the country into debt, and made taxes on tea as well as other imports go up in an attempt to compensate. In effect, the East India Company’s monopoly, artificially high prices, and fixed import supply threw fuel to the fire of a thriving smuggling trade, and by 1784 smuggled tea made up for an estimated two-thirds of all tea consumption in Great Britain. Later in life, Mary wrote in her diary that she never purchased smuggled tea while running the business, despite the cheaper cost, so that it would not dilute the brand's association with quality product.

== Legacy ==
Before Mary died in 1804, she passed her late husband's family business onto their issue. Richard Twining, who left Eton College to help his mother with the family business when he was 14, gained significant knowledge early in life regarding the ins and outs of the tea business while working alongside Mary. Twinings is still in existence more than 300 years after its founding.
