= Fordham, Essex =

Village in Colchester district of Essex, England

Coordinates: 51.9228°N 0.8035°E

Fordham
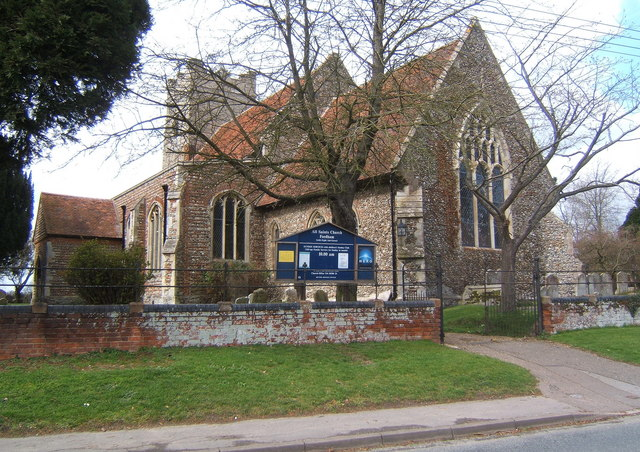
- All Saints' Church

- Location within Essex
- Population: 841 (Parish, 2021)
- Civil parish: Fordham
- District: Colchester
- Shire county: Essex
- Region: East
- Country: England
- Sovereign state: United Kingdom
- Post town: COLCHESTER
- Postcode district: CO6
- Dialling code: 01206
- UK Parliament: Harwich and North Essex

Fordham is a village and civil parish in the Colchester district of Essex, England, six miles north-west of Colchester. As well as Fordham village, the parish also includes the hamlet of Hemp's Green. At the 2021 census the parish had a population of 841.

== Governance ==
Fordham is part of the Essex electoral ward of Fordham and Stour Valley. The population of the ward at the 2011 census was 5,332.

== Natural features ==
Fordham is bounded to the south by the River Colne. An area of 500 acres (202 ha) in the parish was turned over to the Woodland Trust in 2001 for future woodland.

== Amenities and events ==
The village has a historic pub, The Three Horseshoes. A cafe and an antique showroom, The Shoulder of Mutton, stands on the main Colchester–Halstead Road, near the bridge over the Colne, which replaced the ford that gave the hamlet of Fordstreet its name.

Fordham offers primary education to about 100 pupils at All Saints Church of England Primary School.

The village hosts an annual vehicle show on the second Sunday of August.

== Places of worship ==
All Saints' Church is a Grade I listed building, which dates mainly from about 1340. It was formerly under the patronage of Earl de Grey. The village also had a chapel of the Countess of Huntingdon's Connexion in the 19th century.

== Notable people ==
In birth order:

- Roger Walden (died 1406) held Fordham as one of several church benefices. He was later briefly Archbishop of Canterbury, then Bishop of London.
- John Owen (1616–1683), a Nonconformist, held the benefice of Fordham in 1642–1646 as a Calvinist, but was not then appointed as rector.
- Thomas Twining (1735–1804), a noted classical scholar and a member of the Twinings tea-merchant family, held the curacy of the parish church from 1764 until his death.
- Digger Kettle (1922–1999), a professional footballer who played 145 times for Colchester United, died in Fordham.
- Tom Bradshaw (b. 1982), farmer and president of the NFU

== Links ==
- A Late Antique Decorated Casket and Jewellery from the Roman Villa at Fordham, Essex
