= Commutation Act 1784 =

Act of the Parliament of Great Britain

- Act of Parliament
- Parliament of Great Britain
- Long title: An Act for repealing the several Duties on Tea, and for granting to His Majesty other Duties in Lieu thereof, and also several Duties on inhabited Houses, and upon the Importation of Cocoa-Nuts and Coffee, and for repealing the Inland Duties of Excise thereon.
- Citation: 24 Geo. 3. Sess. 2. c. 38
- Territorial extent: Great Britain

Dates
- Royal assent: 20 August 1784
- Commencement: 15 September 1784 (Note: Section 1.)
- Repealed: 6 August 1861

Other legislation
- Repealed by: Statute Law Revision Act 1861

Status: Repealed

Text of statute as originally enacted

The Commutation Act 1784 (24 Geo. 3. Sess. 2. c. 38) was an act of the Parliament of Great Britain that reduced the tax on tea from 119% to 12.5%, effectively ending the smuggling trade. William Pitt the Younger, acting on the advice of Richard Twining of the Twinings Tea Company, introduced the act to increase revenues through legitimate sales of tea by ending 100 years of punitive tea taxes which promoted smuggling.

The act was created to stimulate trade in China for the British East India Company, which at the time was suffering from mounting debts. Indian opium was exchanged for tea in China which was then shipped to Britain for sale on the domestic market.

== Subsequent developments ==
The act improved trade relations between Britain and one of its primary tea suppliers, China.

The whole act was repealed by section 1 of, and the schedule to, the Statute Law Revision Act 1861 (24 & 25 Vict. c. 101), which came into force on 6 August 1861.
