= John Twining =

John Twining may refer to:

- John Thomas Twining, protestant minister in Nova Scotia
- John Aldred Twining, British tea merchant
