= Workhouse Visiting Society =

The Workhouse Visiting Society was an organisation set up in 1858 and existed "to improve moral and spiritual improvement of workhouse inmates" in England and Wales. The group was set up by Louisa Twining of the Twinings tea family. It began as a sub-committee of the National Association for the Promotion of Social Science. It was disbanded in 1865.

== History ==
In 1847, Louisa Twining started to visit an old family nurse and from her she heard about the conditions inside of workhouses. In 1853, she made her first visit to a workhouse and found it to be overcrowded, and lacking food, sanitation and medical care. Afterwards, she approached the Strand Union Poor Law Board for permission to allow a group of ladies to visit one of its workhouses and they initially refused to give it. However, she argued that it was proper for women to look after the old, young and infirm. The Stand Union Poor Law Board and its guardians changed their decision and allowed the visit. In 1857, she started to publicise the poor conditions within workhouses. Additionally, she encouraged the National Association for the Promotion of Social Science to establish a visiting system to provide moral and spiritual comfort to the inmates, and to make the public aware of the poor conditions inside workhouses. One of the people she consulted was Catharine Tait who as the wife of the Dean of Carlisle had thrust herself into visiting her local workhouse.

In 1858 the Workhouse Visiting Society was established and Twining became its first secretary. By 1860 it had 140 active members, who visited the 12 metropolitan workhouses, and there were several local branches in other parts of England. In 1863, the organisation was based at 23 New Ormond Street, Bloomsbury, London. Its members role when visiting workhouses was to show compassion to the inmates. The society focused on publicising the poor conditions inside workhouses that included the production of its own journal. The society was active in exposing the poor standards of nursing care. It also influenced politicians such Lord Shaftesbury to consider workhouse issues. A problem was the number of Workhouse Visiting Society members was too small to cover and deal with all of the problems related to workhouses. In 1865, it was disbanded.

The problems that Louisa Twining faced were known to Catharine Tait and she formed a new and similar organisation exploiting the authority of her husband the Bishop of London and the select membership she produced by only inviting aristocratic or well connected women to join. Her Ladies Diocesan Association was active from 1865 until the twentieth century.

Between 1859 and 1865, the society produced the Journal of the Workhouse Visiting Society, published by Longman, Brown, Green, Longman and Roberts, London. It included correspondence and reports about workhouse issues.
