= William Twining (military physician) =

William Twining (1790–1835) was a British military surgeon who practiced in the Indian Subcontinent.

== Early life ==
William Twining was born in 1790. His father was Reverend William Twining of Nova Scotia. His grandfather, Griffith Twining, had (in 1770) left his home in Clarbeston, Pembrokeshire, Wales to be a missionary abroad. The family has origins in the town of Twining near Tewkesbury. By common ancestry from the 1400s with the Twining family of Pershore, Twining was a distant relation to Richard Twining of Twinings and the East India Company tea trade.

Twining began studying medicine at Guy's Hospital under Astley Cooper in 1808. For two years, he worked as an anatomy demonstrator for Joshua Brookes.

== Career ==
In 1821, he became personal surgeon to Edward Paget, Governor of Ceylon. In 1824, he became the Assistant Surgeon to the Bengal Establishment in the East India Company. While in that role, he also continued his term of military service through 1830.

In 1835, Twining wrote what seems to be the first modern clinical description of kala azar, which he called "tropical sprue". In his description, he said that it was "endemic cachexia of the tropical countries that are subject to paludal exhalations", and then listed characteristics which match contemporary understanding of the disease.
