= Workhouse Infirmary Nursing Association =

British nursing association

The Workhouse Infirmary Nursing Association was created in 1879 to organise training and act as an employment agency for nurses in Poor law infirmaries and workhouses.

It later became the Workhouse Nursing Association. Princess Christian was the president.

It vetted applicants and in one year only 18 of 41 trained nurses who applied were considered suitable.

Louisa Twining and Florence Nightingale were involved with its formation.
