= All Saints Church, Fordham =

All Saints Church
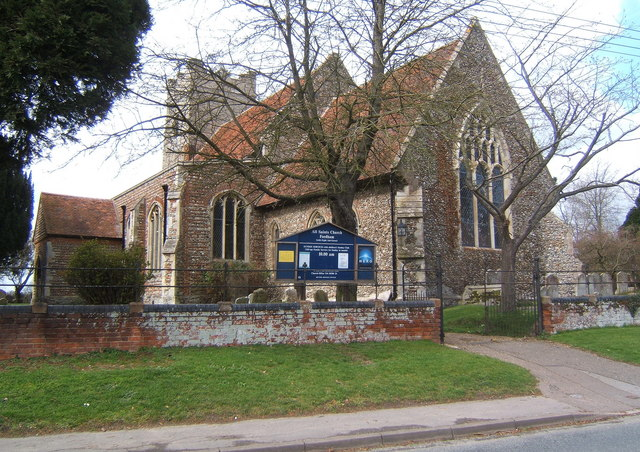
- All Saints Church
- 51°55′05″N 0°48′05″E
- Location: Fordham, Essex, CO6 3NL
- Country: England
- Denomination: Church of England
- Churchmanship: Conservative Evangelical
- Website: fordhamchurch.org.uk

History
- Status: Active
- Dedication: All Saints

Architecture
- Functional status: Parish Church
- Heritage designation: Grade I listed
- Designated: 7 April 1965

Administration
- Diocese: Diocese of Chelmsford
- Archdeaconry: Archdeaconry of Colchester
- Deanery: Colchester
- Parish: Fordham

Clergy
- Rector: The Revd Francis Blight

All Saints Church is a Church of England parish church in Fordham, Essex. The church is a Grade I listed building.

== History ==
All Saints' Anglican Church dates from about 1340. It was restored in 1861. There was also a chapel of the Countess of Huntingdon's Connexion in the village in the 19th century.

Among the past rectors of the parish of Fordham was Roger Walden (died 1406), who was briefly Archbishop of Canterbury and then Bishop of London. The noted classical scholar Thomas Twining, a member of the tea-merchant family, held the curacy of the church from 1764 until his death in 1804.

=== Present day ===
All Saints Church is the parish church of Fordham and is part of the Diocese of Chelmsford. On 7 April 1965, the church was designated a Grade I listed building.

All Saints Church is within the Conservative Evangelical tradition of the Church of England, and it has passed resolutions that reject the ordination of women.

== Gallery ==
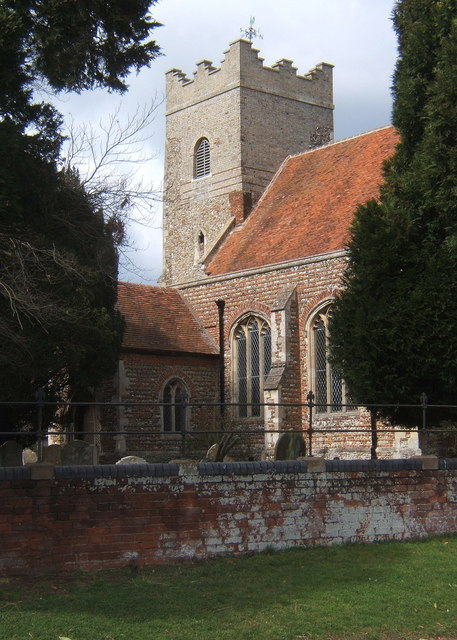
All Saints Church

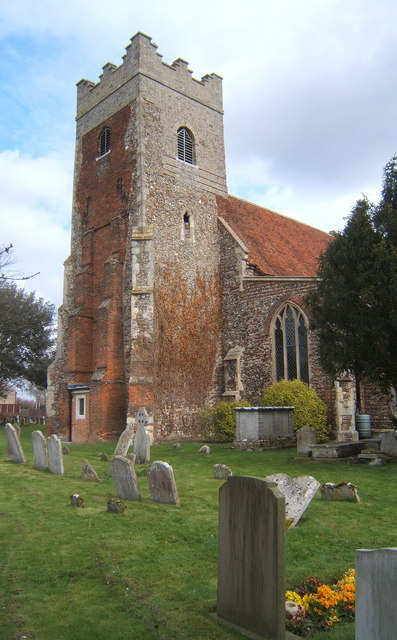
Church tower
