= Hemp's Green =

Hamlet near Colchester, England

Coordinates: 51.927°N 0.787°E

- Location within Essex
- Civil parish: Fordham
- District: Colchester
- Shire county: Essex
- Region: East
- Country: England
- Sovereign state: United Kingdom
- Police: Essex
- Fire: Essex
- Ambulance: East of England

Hemp's Green or Hemps Green is a hamlet in the civil parish of Fordham, in the Colchester district, in the county of Essex, England.

== Nearby ==
Hemp's Green has a riding stables. The nearest Anglican church, primary school and public house are at Fordham (1½ miles, 2.4 km). Other nearby settlements include the town of Colchester and the villages of Wakes Colne and Wormingford.

For transport there road links to Fordham and to the south, to the A1124 road, which leads to Colchester.
