= Louisa Twining =

English philanthropic worker

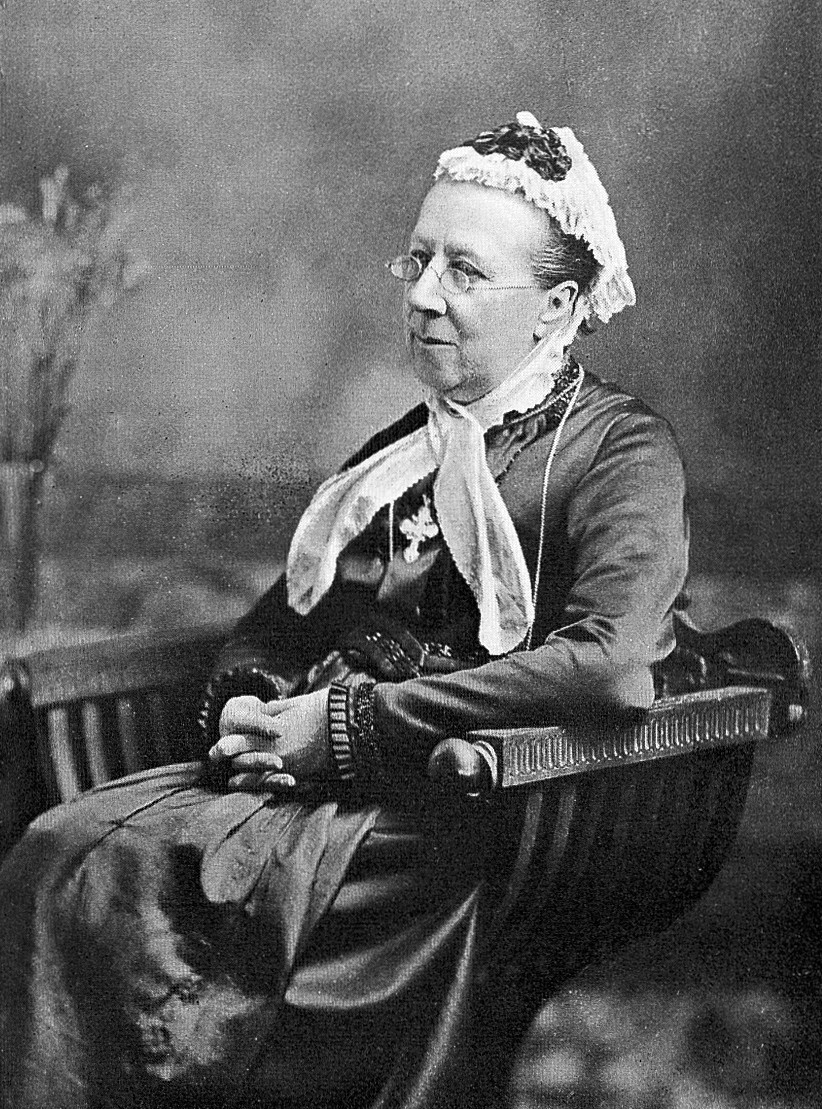
Louisa Twining c. 1906

Louisa Twining (16 November 1820 – 25 September 1912) was an English philanthropist who devoted herself to support for the English Poor Law.

Her family owned the famous Twinings tea business on the Strand. Louisa was initially an artist and art historian, but during her 30s she began support for the provisions of the Poor Law. She helped to establish a home for workhouse girls and a number of societies and associations for the occupants of workhouses and infirmaries. She also served as a Poor Law guardian and was president of the Women's Local Government Society.

== Biography ==
Louisa Twining was born at 20 Norfolk Street (now demolished) in central London, not far from her family's Twinings tea-business on The Strand. She was the ninth and youngest child of Richard Twining (1772–1857), and his wife Elizabeth Mary, née Smythies (1779–1866). She was the youngest sister of the botanical artist Elizabeth Twining.

Twining was an artist and art historian and she wrote and published Symbols and Emblems of Mediaeval Christian Art (1852) and Types and Figures of the Bible (1854).

Louisa was inspired by the conditions in which her nurse lived in advanced age in one of the poorest districts in London, which inspired her to improve social conditions. In 1853, she became interested in movements for social reform, and began the work in support of the Poor Law to which she devoted the rest of her life. In March 1861, she helped to establish a home for workhouse girls; in 1864 she helped to establish the Workhouse Visiting Society; in 1866 she helped to establish the Association for the Improvement of the Infirmaries of London Workhouses; and in 1879 she helped to establish the Workhouse Infirmary Nursing Association. She was said to be ‘the most practical woman I have ever known amongst the many who have taken an interest in the subject’ by Uvedale Corbett Junior.

She was a Poor Law guardian for Kensington during 1884–90, and for Tonbridge Union during 1893–6. She promoted the opening of Lincoln's Inn Fields to the public, and helped to start the Metropolitan and National Association for nursing the poor in their homes, and supported the appointment of police matrons, and was president of the Women's Local Government Society.

Louisa Twining died in her home at 91, Lansdowne Road, Notting Hill, London on 25 September 1912. She is buried at Kensal Green Cemetery.

== Selected publications ==
- Symbols in Early Christian Art. 1852.
- Types and Figures of the Bible. 1854.
- Recollections of workhouse visiting and management during twenty-five years. Kegan Paul, 1880.
- Recollections of Life and Work: Being the Autobiography of Louisa Twining. Edward Arnold, London, 1893.
- Workhouses and pauperism and women's work in the administration of the poor law. Methuen, London, 1898.

In addition, she wrote many papers on Poor Law subjects.

- Books published by Louisa Twining Internet Archive - read online

== Archives ==
Papers of Louisa Twining are held at The Women's Library at London Metropolitan University.
