= Nambarrie =

Nambarrie Tea Co. Ltd
- Company type: Subsidiary
- Founded: Belfast, United Kingdom of Great Britain and Ireland (1860)
- Headquarters: Andover, Hampshire
- Key people: Pratt and Montgomery
- Products: Teas
- Owner: Twinings
- Website: www.nambarrie.co.uk

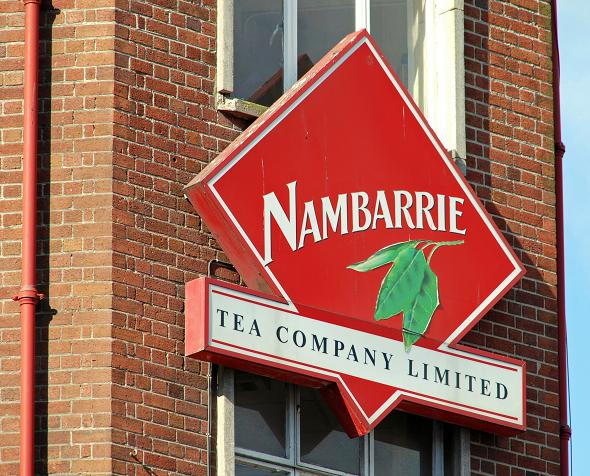
Nambarrie sign on a tea packing warehouse, Belfast

Nambarrie is the brand name of a tea company, founded in Belfast in 1860, and later based in Andover, Hampshire. Now owned by Twinings, Nambarrie Tea Co. Ltd. operates delivery depots in Mallusk, County Antrim and Glasgow, being the third biggest brand in Scotland.

== Founding and war years ==
Founded in 1860, the company began trading in York Street, Belfast, originally as 'Pratt and Montgomery'. During wartime bombing in 1941, the company's premises in Tomb Street, Belfast were completely destroyed, reportedly leaving only a horse drawn delivery van intact.

== Sponsorship ==
In 1998, Nambarrie teamed up with author Geoff Hill to sponsor "The Nambarrie Run: Delhi to Belfast on a Royal Enfield", and repeated the stunt in 2006 with "The Nambarrie Run II: Chile to Alaska on a Triumph". Richard McQuillan, Marketing Executive for Nambarrie said "We are delighted to be involved with Geoff in his latest journey, as the number one tea in Northern Ireland it is great that we can be supportive of our local writing talent."

Nambarrie has also been involved in sponsoring many other charity events, such as The Great Scottish Run in 2002, and raising money for The Maggie's Centre, Glasgow's first dedicated cancer care centre.

== Former factory ==
On 10 April 2008 Nambarrie announced plans to close its factory in Belfast. The factory is now closed and production currently takes place in England. The signage at the Belfast Nambarrie factory is still attached, however the building is now disused and has since fallen into disrepair.
