= Richard Twining (tea merchant, born 1772) =

British tea merchant

Richard Twining FRS (5 May 1772 – 14 October 1857) was a British tea merchant. He was the eldest son of Richard Twining (1749–1824), who was a director of the East India Company, and the director of the London tea-merchants Twinings.

== Life ==
Richard Twining was born on 5 May 1772 at Devereux Court, Strand, London. He was educated at Norwich Grammar School by Samuel Parr.

Twining joined his father's tea-business in 1794, and worked for Twinings until five weeks before his death. He was elected a Fellow of the Royal Society on 5 June 1834.

Twining married Elizabeth Mary Smythies, who was the daughter of The Rev. John Smythies, on 5 May 1802. They had nine children, including the social reformer Louisa Twining, and the botanical illustrator Elizabeth Twining.

Richard Twining died on 14 October 1857. He is buried at Kensal Green Cemetery.
