= Edmund Uvedale =

Edmund Uvedale may refer to:

- Edmund Uvedale (died 1606), MP for Dorset
- Edmund Uvedale (died 1621), MP for Corfe Castle
