= Richard Twining (cricketer) =

English cricketer

Personal information
- Full name: Richard Haynes Twining
- Born: 3 November 1889; St Pancras, London, England
- Died: 3 January 1979 (aged 89); Kensington, London, England
- Batting: Right-handed
- Role: Wicket-keeper

Career statistics
| Competition | FC |
|---|---|
| Matches | 78 |
| Runs scored | 2,963 |
| Batting average | 22.96 |
| 100s/50s | 3/14 |
| Top score | 135 |
| Balls bowled | 24 |
| Wickets | 0 |
| Bowling average | - |
| 5 wickets in innings | 0 |
| 10 wickets in match | 0 |
| Best bowling | - |
| Catches/stumpings | 40/10 |
- Source: CricketArchive, 25 March 2009

Richard Haynes Twining CBE (3 November 1889 – 3 January 1979) was an English cricketer who played 78 first-class matches between 1910 and 1928. Most of his games were for Middlesex and Oxford University, for whom he appeared 32 times apiece, but the rest were spread between nine other sides.

Twining was a son of Herbert Twining, a banker, of the family of the Twinings tea merchants. He was educated at Hazelwood School, where he was captain of both football and cricket XIs; Eton College, where he was captain of cricket; and Magdalen College, Oxford, where he won a blue for cricket in his first year, played football as well as cricket for the university, and was captain of the Oxford side in 1912. During World War I he was an officer in the Queen's Royal West Surrey Regiment. He was very badly injured in the knee in Gallipoli and it was feared that his cricket career was over, and even though he was able resume playing he was lame. He was noted to have a strong defence and was master of the late cut.

Twining's most important contribution to a cricket match was in the County Championship decider at Surrey at Lord's in 1921. Surrey required a victory to win the title, otherwise Middlesex would themselves become champions. Surrey were favourites after achieving a first-innings lead of 137, but Twining hit a career-best 135, adding 229 with J. W. Hearne (106) for the second wicket to help Middlesex to their target of 322 with just four wickets down.

After retiring from playing, Twining continued to take an active role in cricketing affairs. He was President of Marylebone Cricket Club (MCC) in 1964, and President of Middlesex between 1950 and 1957.

Twining was a stockbroker; he was deputy chairman of the London Stock Exchange 1949–58 and was appointed CBE for that service in the New Year Honours of 1959.
