= Thomas Twining (merchant) =

English businessman

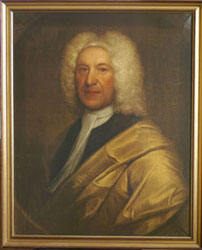
Portrait of Thomas Twining

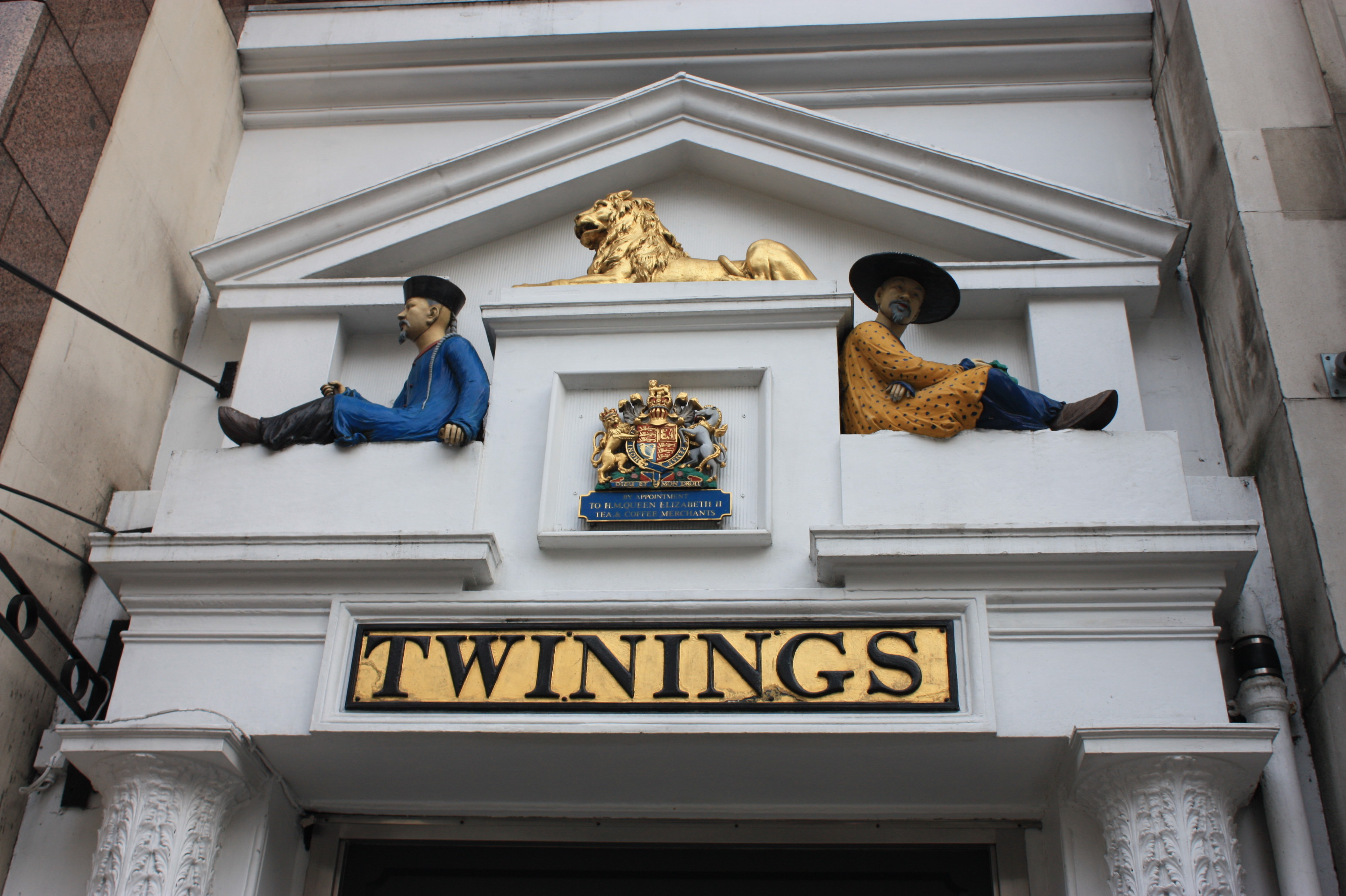
The Twining shop entrance on the Strand, London

Thomas Twining (1675 in Painswick, Gloucestershire, England – 19 May 1741 in Twickenham, Greater London) was an English merchant, and the founder of the tea merchant Twinings of London.

== Life ==
Thomas Twining was son of a fuller who had moved to London when Thomas was nine years old. Thomas was first apprenticed to a weaver. He changed careers, however, and worked for a merchant. He became a Freeman of the City of London in 1701, when he worked for the East India Company under Thomas D'Aeth, from whom he bought Tom's Coffee House at No. 216 Strand, London in 1706. In addition to coffee, Twining sold tea, and acquired a reputation for having the finest blends in London. Shortly after opening on the Strand, Twining was selling more dry tea than brewed tea.

He expanded his store in 1717 into three adjacent houses. By 1734, Twining sold tea almost exclusively, with few coffee sales. In about 1722, Twining bought a property later known as Dial House, next door to St Mary's Church, Twickenham, where he either rebuilt or converted and extended the buildings already there. The sundial on the façade is dated 1726, which is possibly the year in which the new building was finished.

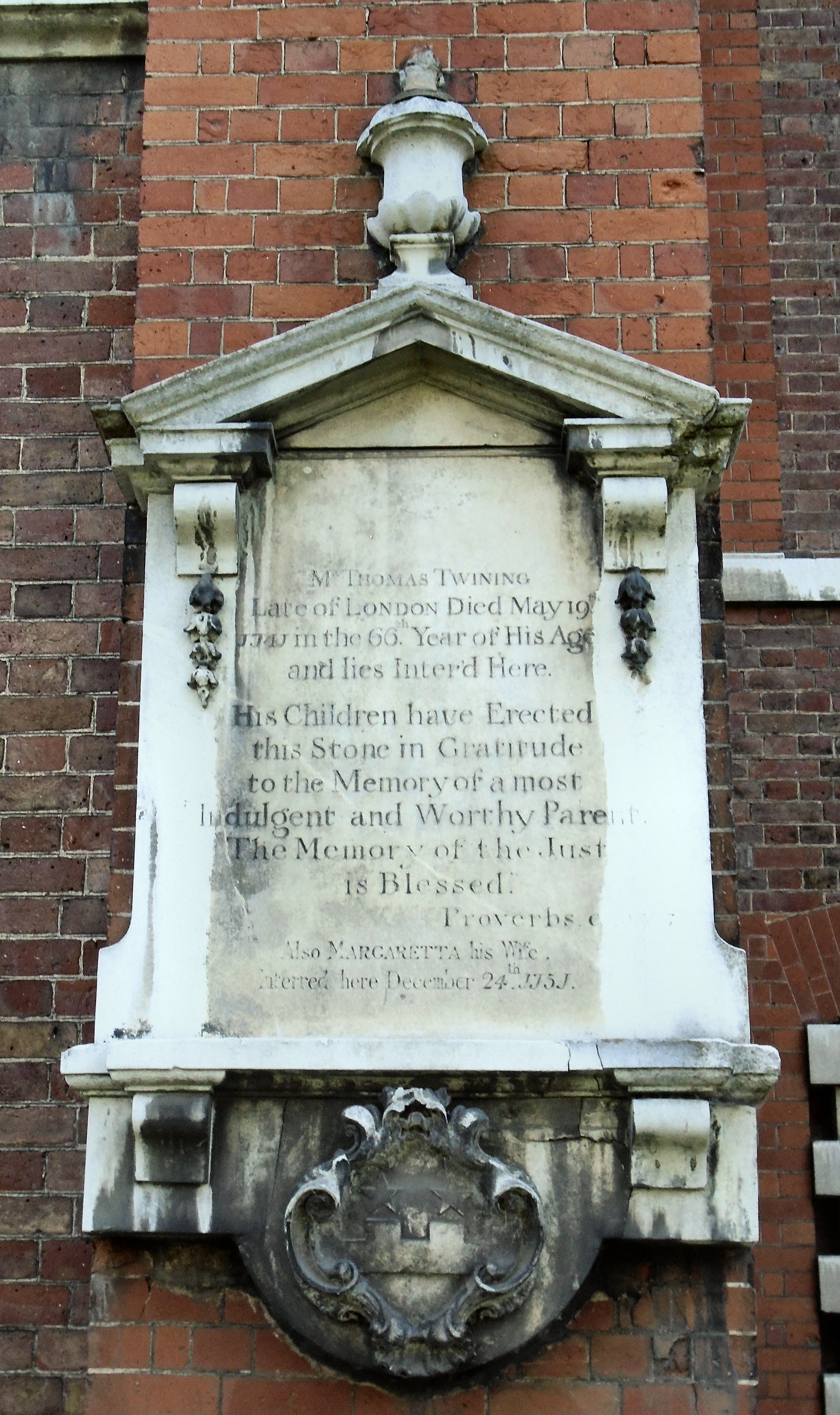
Memorial, St Mary's Church, Twickenham

Thomas Twining died in 1741. He was buried at St Mary's Church, where there is a memorial to him, at the north-east corner.

== Legacy ==
Twining's son Daniel Twining inherited the business. Dial House remained in the Twining family for many years after Thomas's death: the last member of the family to live there was the botanical illustrator Elizabeth Twining, who resided there from 1866, after the death of her mother, until her own death in 1889. Subsequently the house was donated to the parish of Twickenham by her brother, Richard Twining, as a replacement for the existing vicarage, because the latter was in a condition of disrepair. Dial House has continued to belong to the Church of England: it is now used as the official residence and office of the Bishop of Kensington.
