= Uvedale Corbett Junior =

Uvedale Corbett Jr. was a Poor Law inspector.

In 1855 he was District Auditor to the Llanfyllin Poor Law Union.

He had a salary of around £600 a year.

Gathorne Hardy appointed him, in 1866, as ‘an inspector of much experience’ with Dr. W. O. Markham, a former editor of the British Medical Journal, to visit the London workhouses with a view to procuring information which might assist him in drafting new legislation for the reform of workhouse infirmaries. He was summoned from Derby at less than a day's notice. The Poor Law Board paid to move him, his family, his furniture and his five servants to his new house in Onslow Square. He explained to Hardy that on an inspection he would "go immediately to the sick wards of the infirmary without forewarning, to ensure that no preparations were made for his arrival. Inspection of the sick wards was the heaviest part of his work and a part he did not wish to hurry. He would question some of the inmates quietly, to gain their confidence, for as a rule paupers were not disposed to make complaints. He would try to find out if they were treated kindly by the officers, whether any little amusement or occupation was afforded them, whether the doctor was patient with them, the chaplain came to read to them, and whether they were well nursed and attended in the night".

In 1875 he participated in a Poor Law conference in Shrewsbury as a Local Government Board Inspector.
