= Thomas Twining (scholar) =

English classical scholar and cleric (1735–1804)

Thomas Twining (8 January 1735, Twickenham, London, England – 6 August 1804, Colchester) was an English classical scholar and cleric.

== Scholarship ==
The son of Daniel Twining, tea merchant of London, and Ann March, he was originally intended for a commercial life, but because of his distaste for it and his fondness for study, his father decided to send him to university. He entered Sidney Sussex College, Cambridge in 1755, and became a fellow in 1760. He took orders and was married in 1764 to Elizabeth Smythies (1739–1796), daughter of Palmer Smythies, rector of St Michael's, Colchester, who had taught him at Colchester Free Grammar School. Twining spent the remainder of his life as incumbent of All Saints Church, Fordham, Essex, and in plurality as vicar of White Notley (from 1772) and rector of St Mary-at-the-Walls, Colchester (from 1788), where he lived from 1790 until his death on 6 August 1804.

Twining's reputation as a classical scholar was established by his translation, with notes, of Aristotle's Poetics (1789). His epitaph was composed by a lifelong friend and fellow scholar, Samuel Parr, and another such friend, the musicologist Charles Burney, composed an obituary.

== Musicianship ==
Twining was an accomplished musician and assisted Charles Burney in writing his remarkable History of Music. His calls on the Burney family in London in 1775 were vividly and affectionately described by Burney's daughter Fanny: "He is a man of learning, very fond of music, and a good performer both on the harpsichord and the violin. He commenced a correspondence with my father upon the publication of his German Tour, which they have kept up with great spirit ever since; for Mr. Twining, besides being deep in musical knowledge, is a man of great humour and drollery."

Thomas's half-brother Richard Twining, a director of the East India Company and head of the tea company in The Strand, was also intimate with the Burney family and one of seven Twinings, including Thomas, to subscribe to Fanny's novel Camilla in 1795. Thomas later sent a double-folio sheet of corrections of punctuation and usage to Fanny Burney, which she incorporated into a second edition of the novel in 1802. As she put it, "I am proud that HE thinks the work worth flagellating."

== Papers ==
Selections from Thomas Twining's correspondence can be found in Recreations and Studies of a Country Clergyman of the Eighteenth Century (1882) and Selections from Papers of the Twining Family (1887) edited by his grand-nephew Richard Twining; see also Gentleman's Magazine, lxxiv. 490, and J. E. Sandys, History of Classical Scholarship, vol. iii. (1908).
