= Elizabeth Twining =

English painter

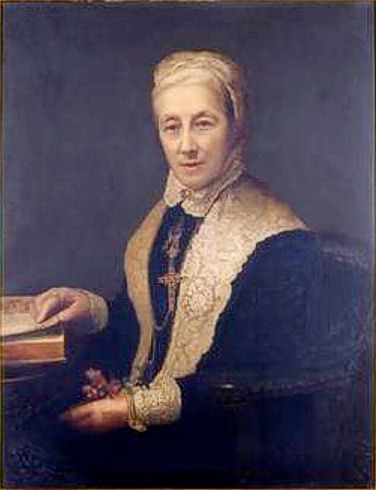
- Portrait of Elizabeth Twining
- Born: 1805
- Died: 1889 (aged 83–84)
- Known for: Botanical illustrations
- Notable work: Illustrations of the Natural Order of Plants

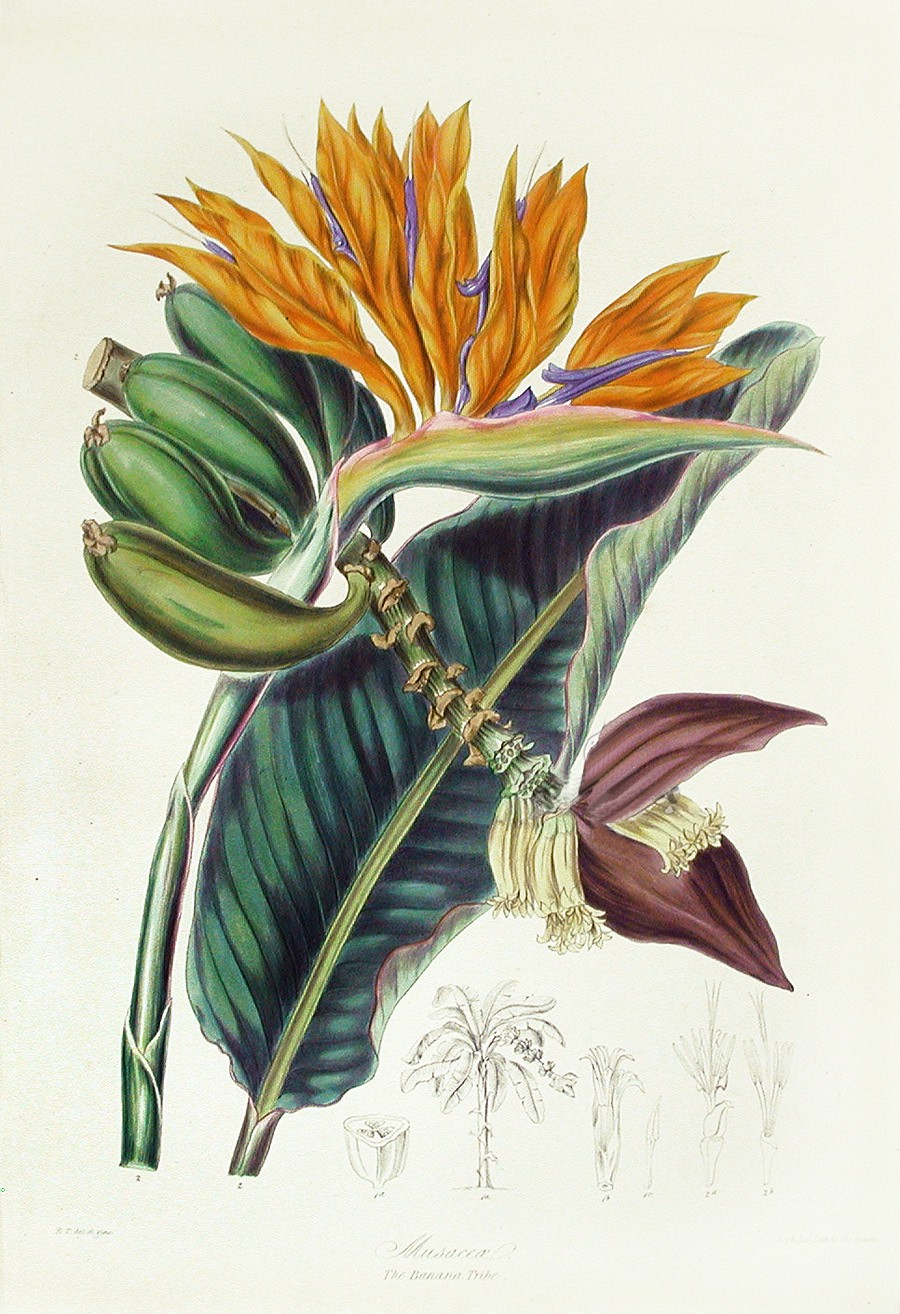
Musaceae Illustration from Illustrations of the Natural Order of Plants

Elizabeth Twining (1805–1889) was an English painter, writer, and botanical illustrator. She is best known for her detailed botanical illustrations, especially the two-volume Illustrations of the Natural Order of Plants, which was published between 1849 and 1855. She was an heiress of the Twinings family of tea merchants and was a philanthropist.

== Biography ==
Elizabeth Twining was born in 1805 into the Twinings tea-merchant family. She was one of the nine children of Elizabeth Mary (née Smythies) and Richard Twining. She was raised in London, where she learned art and drawing as part of her education, during which she was inspired by Curtis's The Botanical Magazine and the gardens of the Royal Horticultural Society at Chiswick. She began to draw plants and flowers, and practiced by making sketches from works in the Dulwich Picture Gallery. She was able to visit famous museums with her father's patronage.

Elizabeth Twining wrote and illustrated a number of books on the subject of botany, most notably the two-volume Illustrations of the Natural Order of Plants (volume I published in 1849: volume II in 1855), which included 160 hand-coloured lithographs in royal-folio size, which were reportedly based on observations made at the Royal Botanical Gardens in Kew, and at Lexden Park in Colchester. The subsequent 1868 quarto-size edition features less costly chromolithographed plates. She organised the illustrations of plant orders based on the de Candolle system, that was a new innovation at the time.

Elizabeth Twining resided at the old family residence of Dial House, in Twickenham. She died in 1889, and, in her will, Dial House was given to the people of Twickenham for use as the vicarage. Most of her original artwork is now part of the collection of the British Museum. She is buried in Twickenham Cemetery.

Elizabeth was an elder sister of the social reformer Louisa Twining.

== Other activities ==
Elizabeth Twining was a notable philanthropist. She established and managed a temperance hall in Portugal Street in Holborn, London; renovated the parish almshouses near her home at Twickenham (a fact commemorated by a plaque on St Mary's Church, Twickenham); and, after a long association with King's College Hospital, established the St John's Hospital for the treatment of the poor. She was the founder of "mothers' meetings" in London, for which she wrote Ten Years in a Ragged School and Readings for Mothers' Meetings. She contributed to the founding of the Bedford College for Women by Elizabeth Jesser Reid.

== Gallery ==
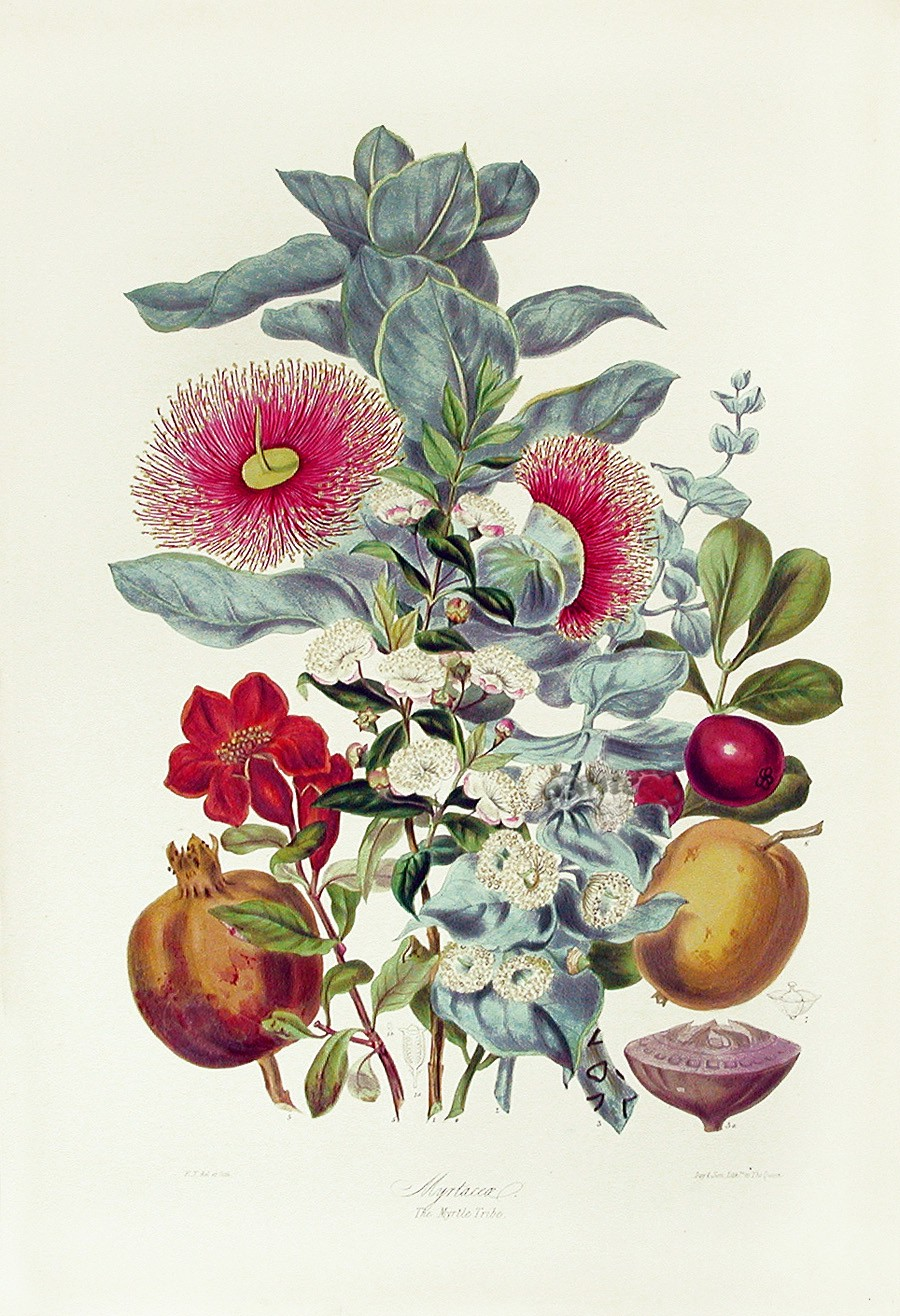

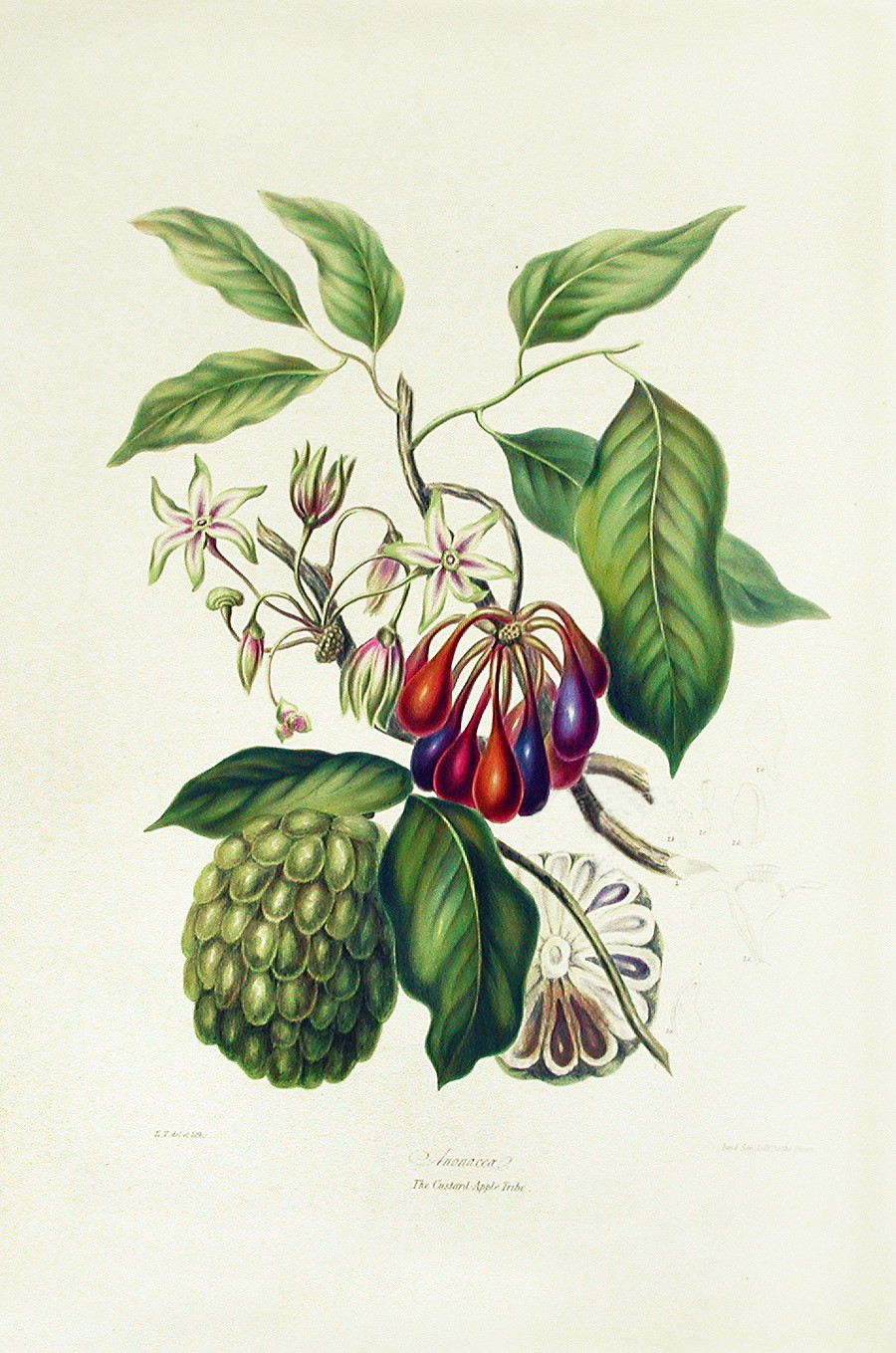

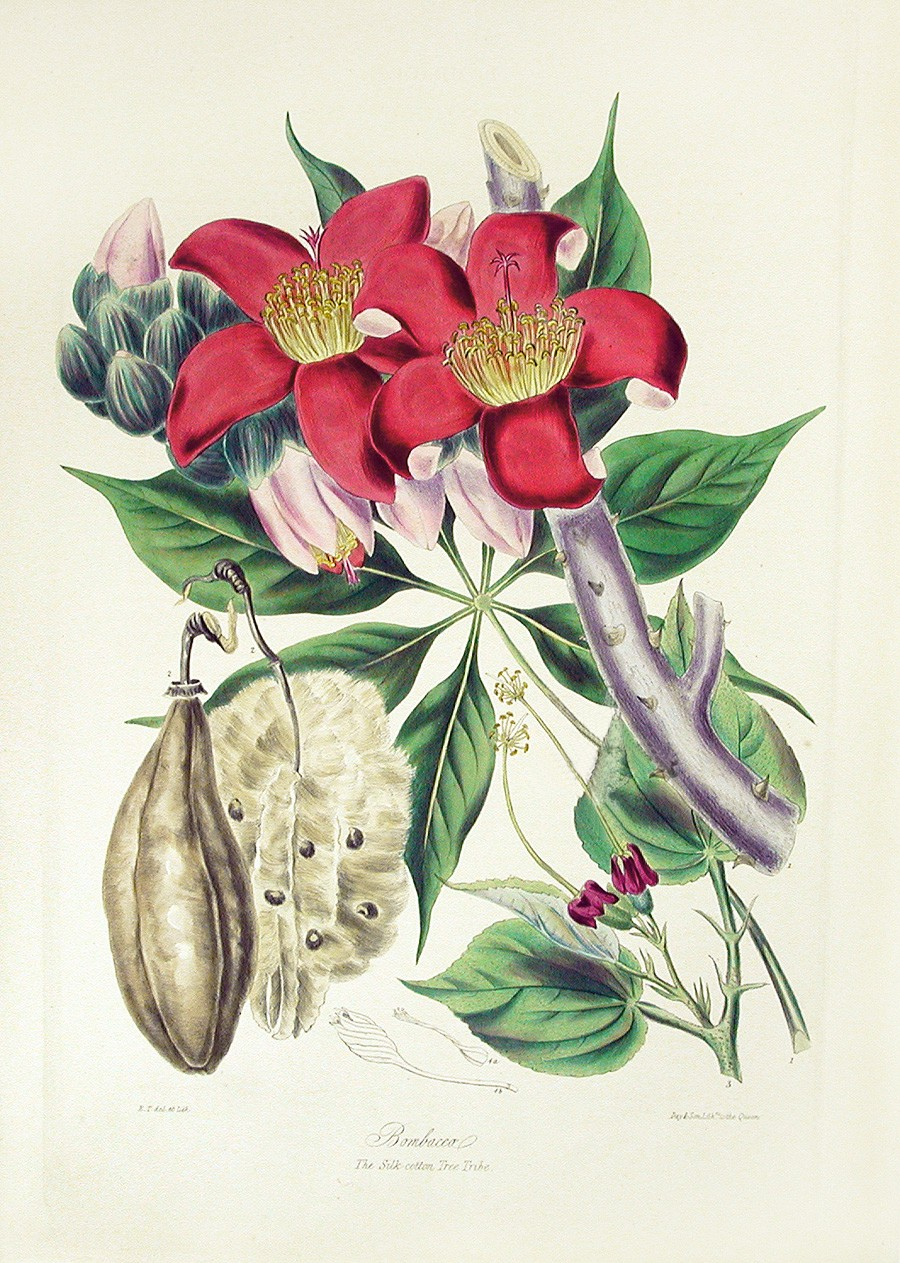

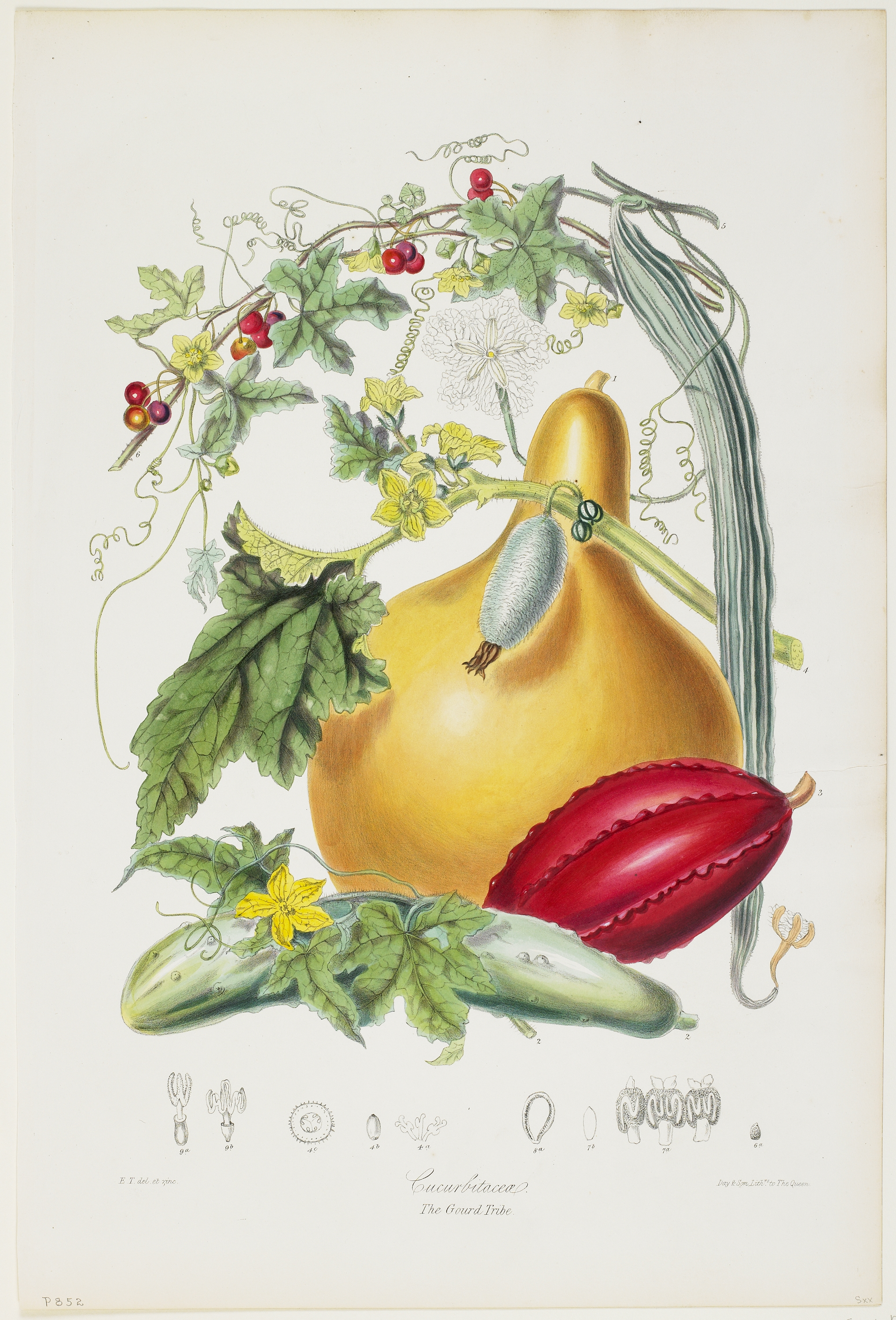

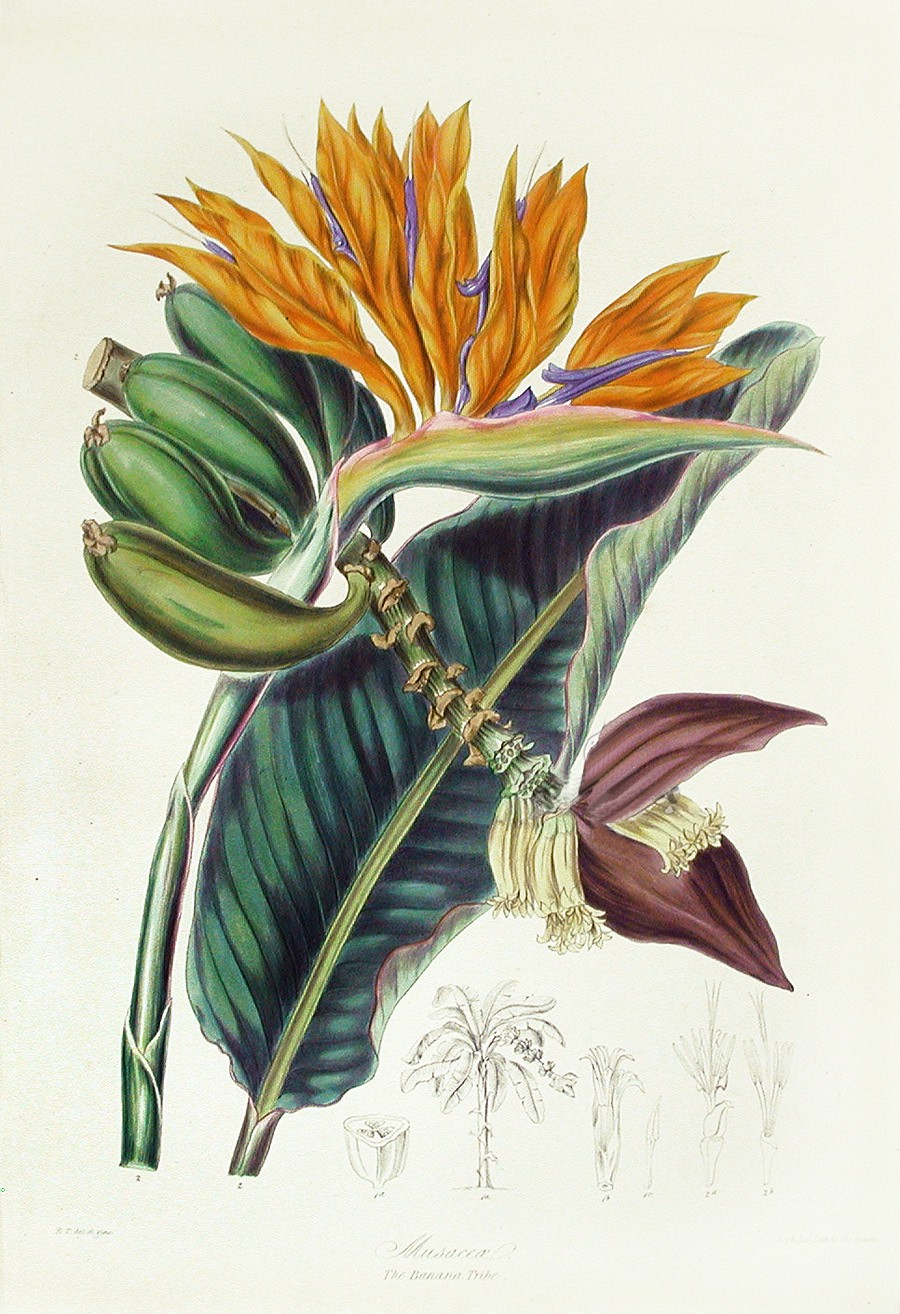

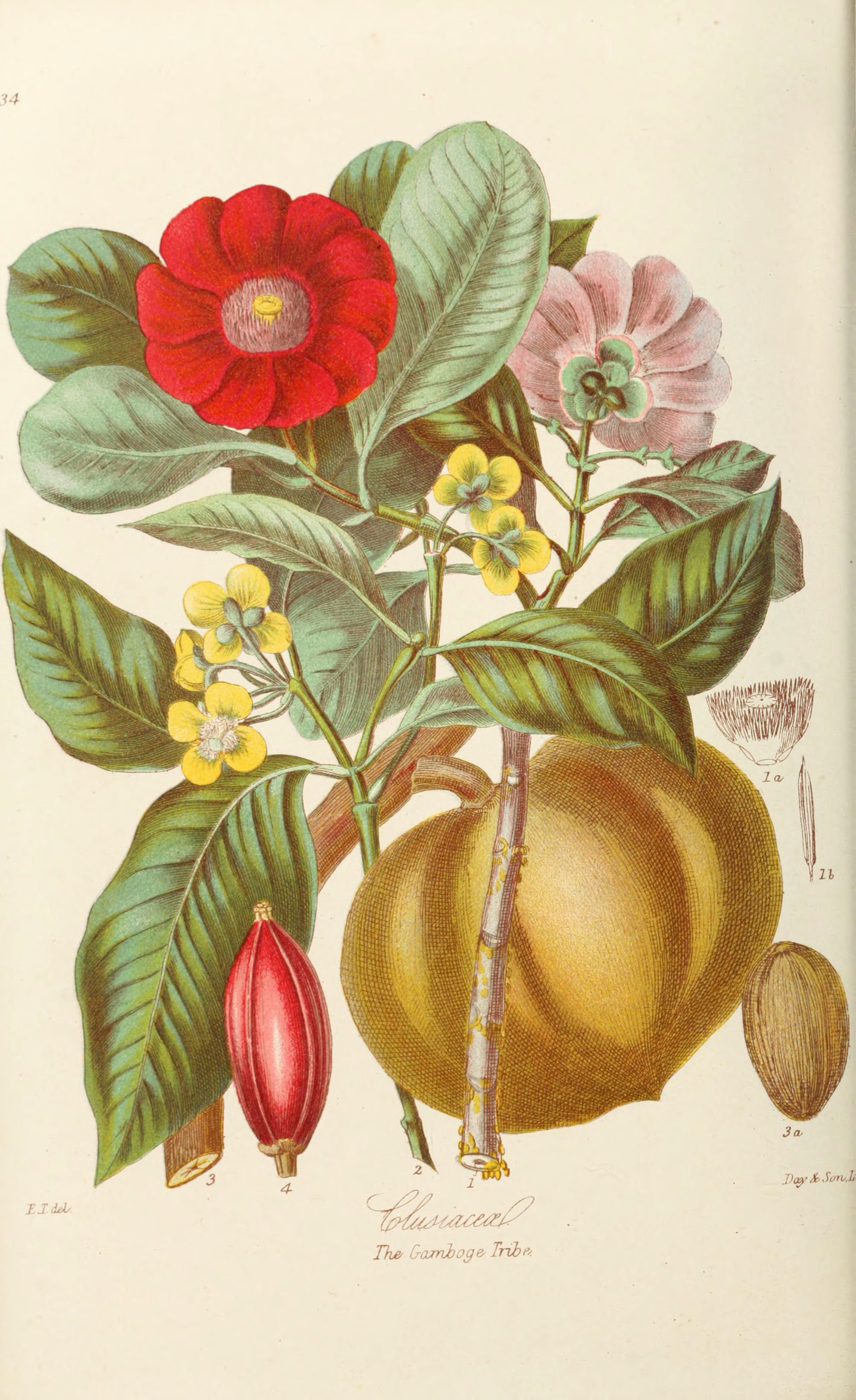

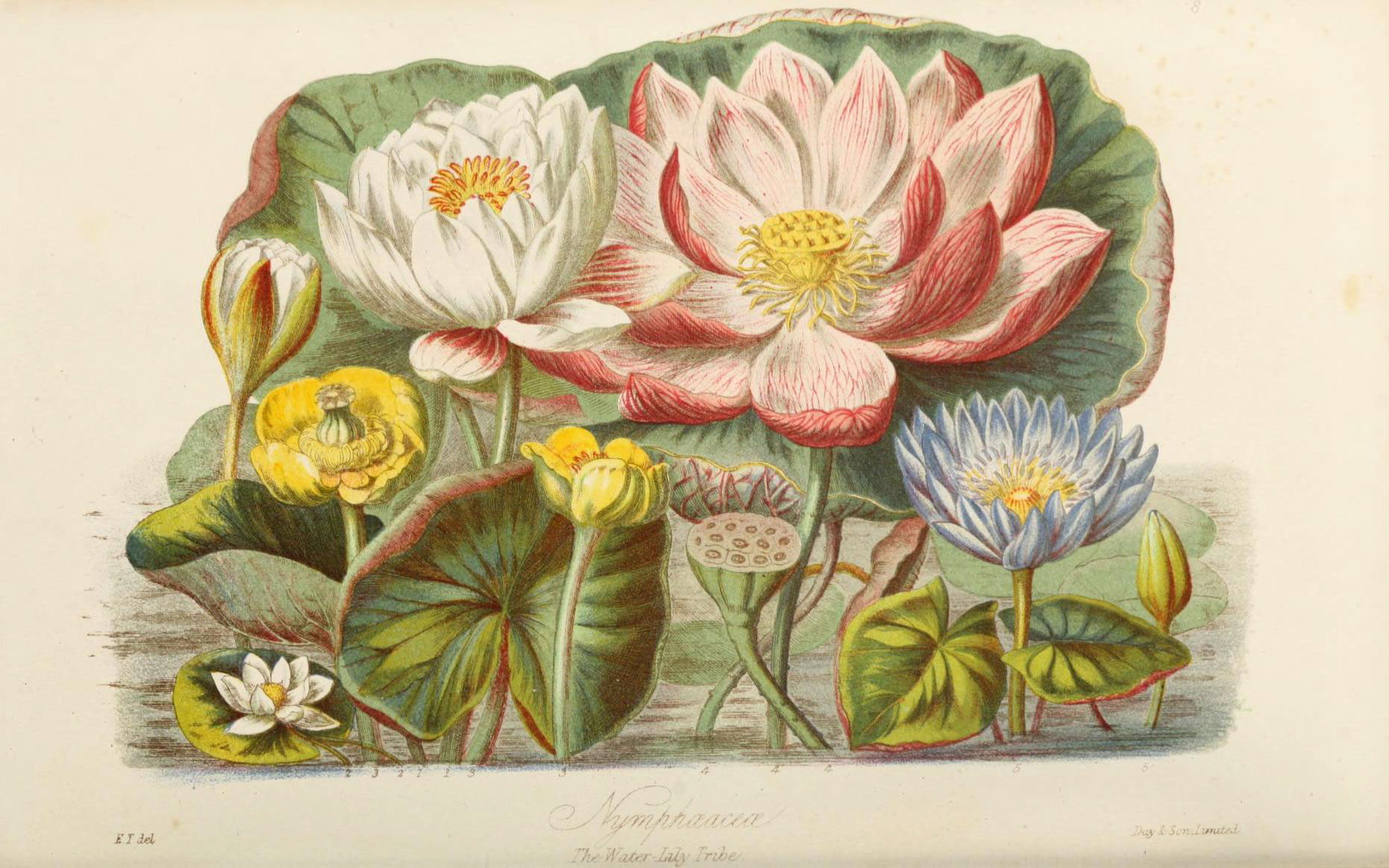
