= Richard Twining (tea merchant, born 1749) =

English merchant

Richard Twining (1749–1824) was an English merchant, a director of the East India Company, and the head of Twinings the tea merchants in the Strand, London.

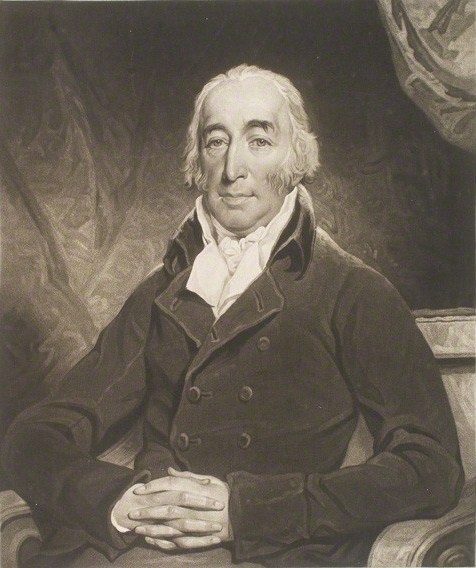
Richard Twining, 1812 engraving by Charles Turner, after John James Halls

== Life ==
Richard Twining was one of three sons of Daniel Twining; his mother was Mary Twining, née Little, Daniel's second wife. Richard was born at Devereux Court in 1749, and educated at Eton College.

He entered the Twinings tea business at the age of fourteen years, with his mother, after the death of his father in 1762. He succeeded to its sole management in 1782 (joined later by his brother John). He participated in the major development of the tea trade caused by the operation of Commutation Act in 1784–6, during the drafting of which William Pitt the Younger repeatedly consulted him.

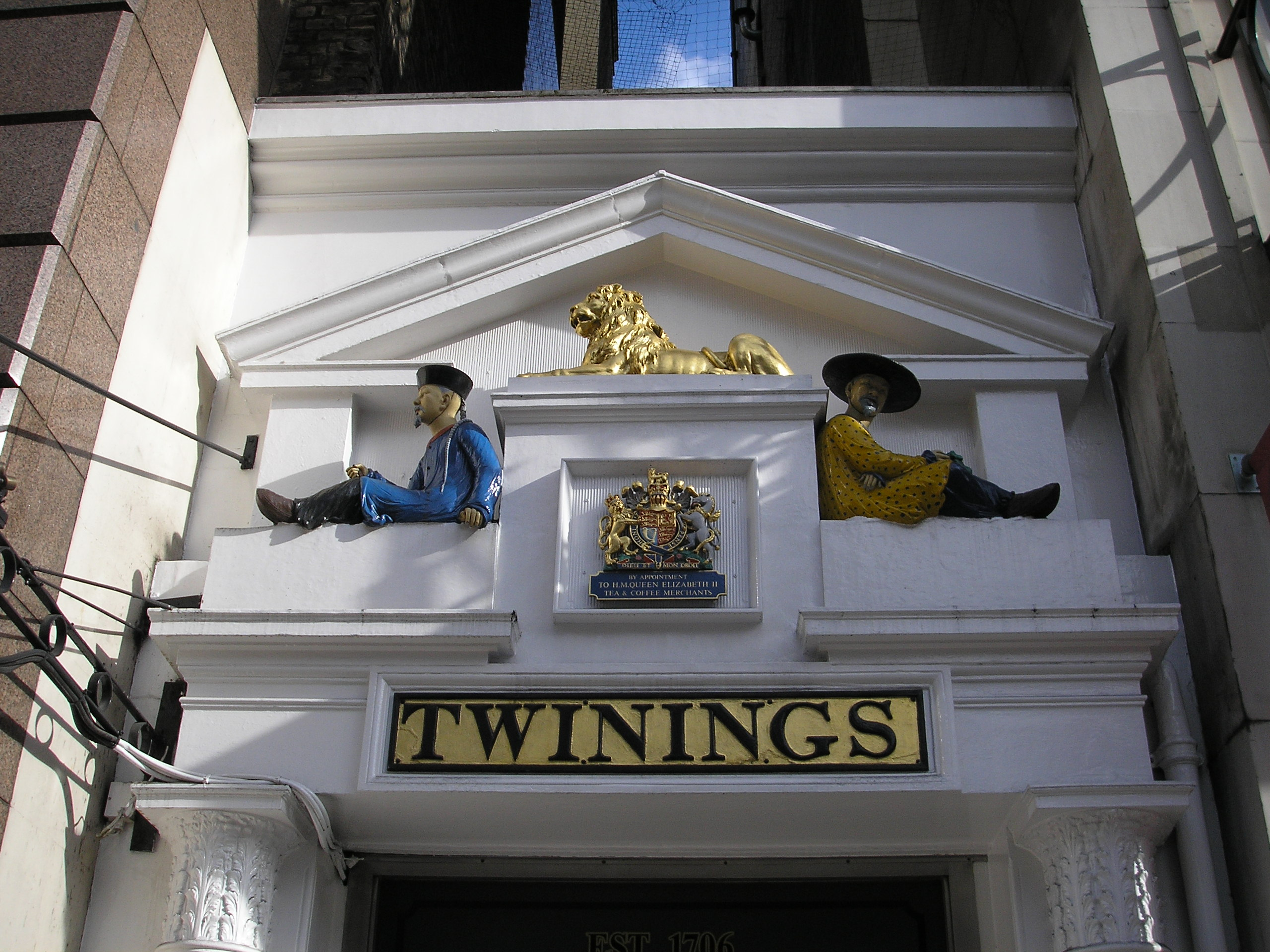
Entrance to Twinings in The Strand, built by Richard Twining

In 1793 Twining was elected a director of the East India Company. He had published three papers of Remarks on the tea trade of the company, and one of his first acts was to carry a self-denying motion prohibiting directors from trading with India; he took a prominent part in the affairs of the court until his resignation in 1816 in consequence of poor health.

Twining was a traveller whose tours on the Continent and of England were the subject of his journals and letters to his half-brother Thomas, extracts from which were published by his grandson Richard Twining in 1887, as Selections from Papers of the Twining Family. He died on 23 April 1824.

== Family ==
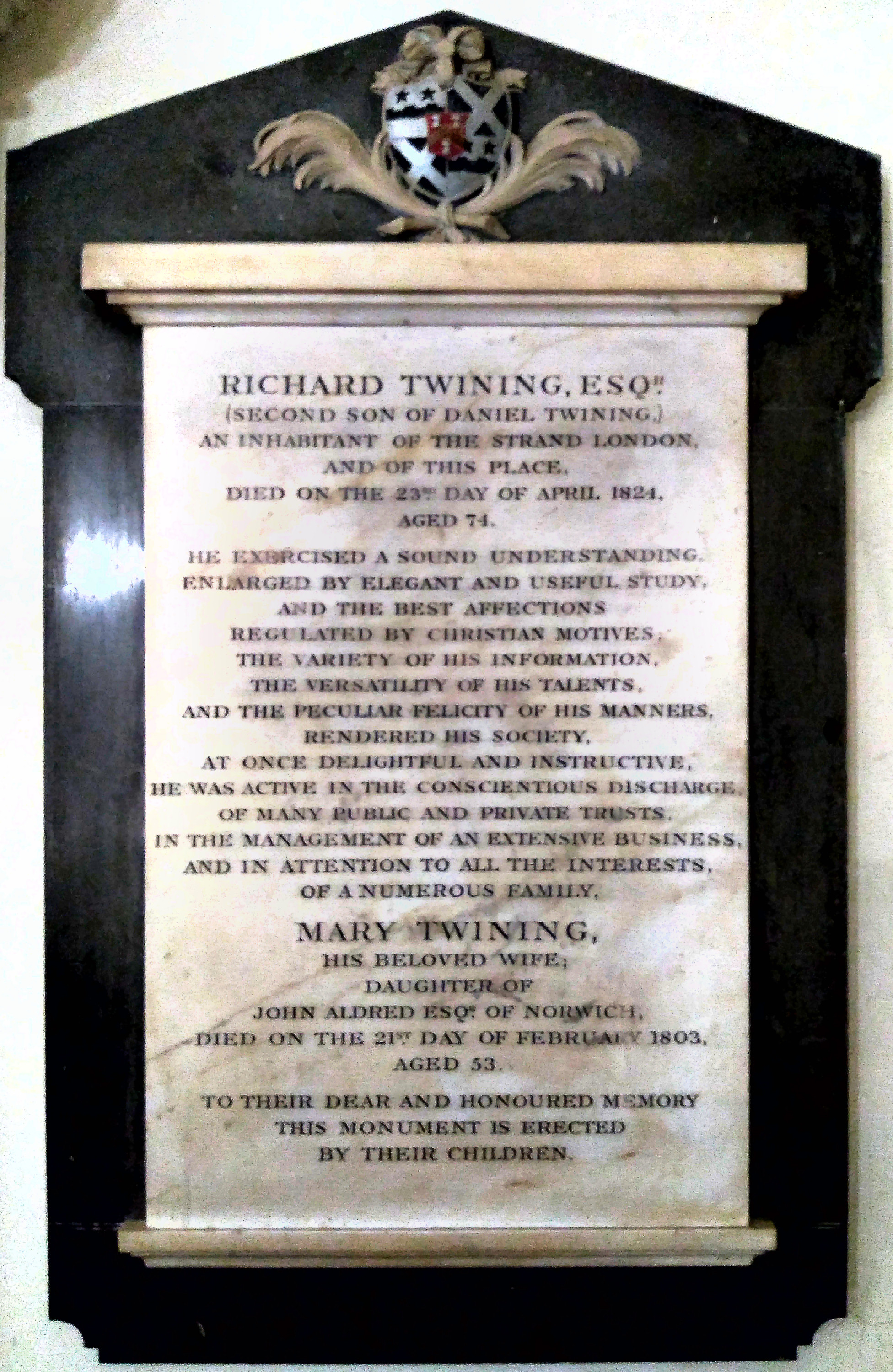
Memorial, St Mary's Church, Twickenham

By his marriage, in 1771, to Mary Aldred of Norwich, Twining had six sons and four daughters. The eldest son, Richard Twining (1772–1857), worked for their tea-business until within five weeks of his death on 14 October 1857; and was appointed chairman of the committee of bylaws at East India House and, carrying on the scholarly habits of his father and uncle, was an old member of the Society of Arts and a Fellow of the Royal Society.

Richard (b. 1749)'s grandson Richard succeeded to the Twinings tea-business and edited his grandfather's and granduncle's correspondence.
