= Twinings =

English marketer of tea and beverages

- Logo used since 1787

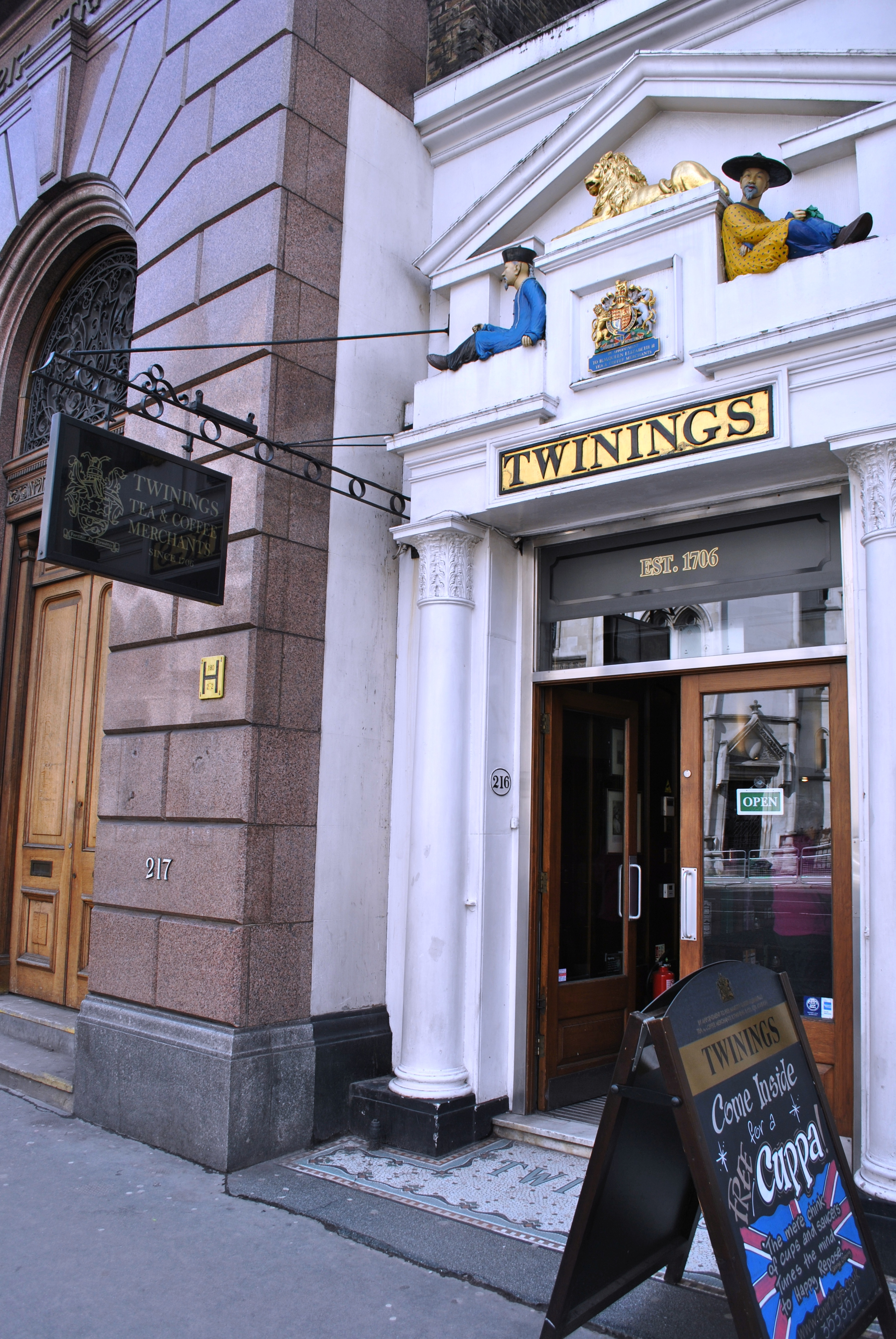
- Twinings' shop on the Strand in central London was established as a tea room in 1706
- Current owner: Associated British Foods
- Country: United Kingdom
- Introduced: 1706; 320 years ago
- Markets: Beverages
- Website: twinings.co.uk

Twinings (/ˈtwaɪnɪŋz/ TWY-ningz) is a British marketeer of tea and other beverages, including coffee, hot chocolate, and malt drinks, based in Andover, Hampshire. The brand is owned by Associated British Foods. It holds the world's oldest continually used company logo and is London's longest-standing ratepayer, having occupied the same premises on the Strand since 1706. Twinings tea varieties include black tea, green tea and herbal infusions, along with fruit-based cold infusions.

== History ==
Twinings was founded by Thomas Twining, of Painswick, Gloucestershire, England, who opened Britain's first known tea room at No. 216 Strand, London, in 1706; it still operates today. The firm's logo, created in 1787, is the world's oldest in continuous use.

Holder of a royal warrant, Twinings was acquired by Associated British Foods in 1964. The company is associated with Earl Grey, a tea infused with bergamot, though it is unclear when this association began, and how important the company's involvement with the tea has been. Competitor Jacksons of Piccadilly, acquired by Twinings during the 1990s, is also associated with the bergamot blend.

In April 2008, Twinings announced the closure of its Nambarrie plant in Belfast, a tea company in trade for over 140 years. Citing an "efficiency drive", Twinings moved most of its production to China and Poland in late 2011, while retaining its Andover, Hampshire factory with a reduced workforce.

In 2023, Twinings ceased production of lapsang souchong, replacing it with a product called "Distinctively Smoky", widely considered to be of inferior quality. Lapsang souchong was one of the tea blends sold by Twinings since the 1700s and was regarded as the favourite drink of Winston Churchill. Twinings cited difficulty sourcing the blend along with rising market prices for the substitution.

== Ethics ==
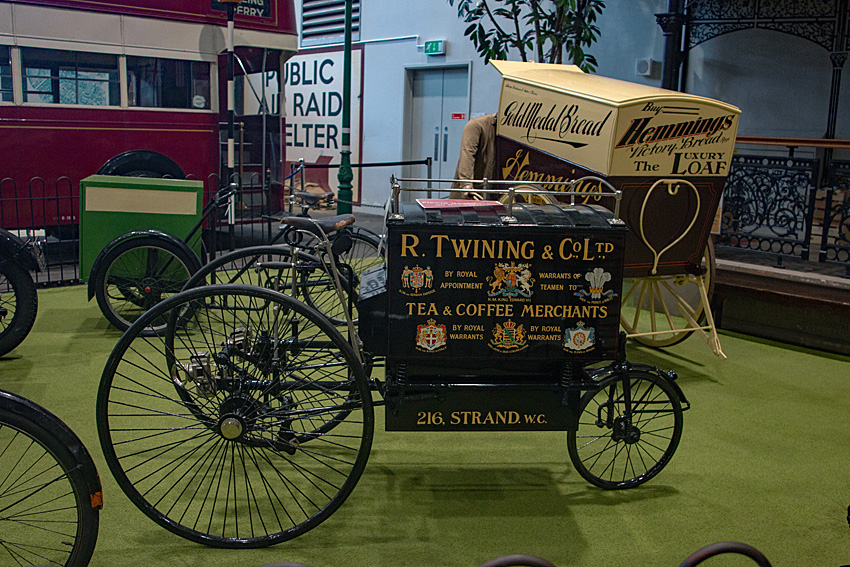
Twining's delivery tricycle

Twinings' ethical tea programme, Sourced with Care, aims to improve the quality of life in the communities from which it buys tea. The company is a founding member of the Ethical Tea Partnership, a not-for-profit membership organisation of tea-packing companies which undertake monitoring and improving conditions on tea estates in all major tea-growing regions. Twinings has an Ethical Code of Conduct and works with all its packaging and raw material suppliers to ensure decent working conditions in the supply chain.

Twining's tea bag

In August 2018, Twinings published a list of all its tea suppliers in India on its Sourced with Care website. This came after Traidcraft Exchange called on all the major UK tea brands to show the public which tea plantations they buy from and crack down on modern slavery in the supply chain. Traidcraft Exchange welcomed the move, their policy adviser, Fiona Gooch, saying that it would put "pressure on the other big tea brands to follow suit".

== Notable members of the Twining family ==
- Thomas Twining (1675–1741), tea merchant, Twinings founder
- Mary Twining (1726–1804), tea merchant, mother of Richard Twining
- Thomas Twining (1735–1804), classical scholar
- Richard Twining (1749–1824), tea merchant
- William Twining (1790–1835), military physician
- Elizabeth Twining (1805–1889), botanical illustrator
- Louisa Twining (1820–1912), social reformer
- Edward Twining (1899–1967), diplomat

== See also ==
- Brooke Bond
- Lipton
- PG Tips
- Tata Tea
- Tetley
- Typhoo tea
- Yorkshire Tea
- BOH Tea
