= 2023–24 European windstorm season =

2023–2024 European windstorm season
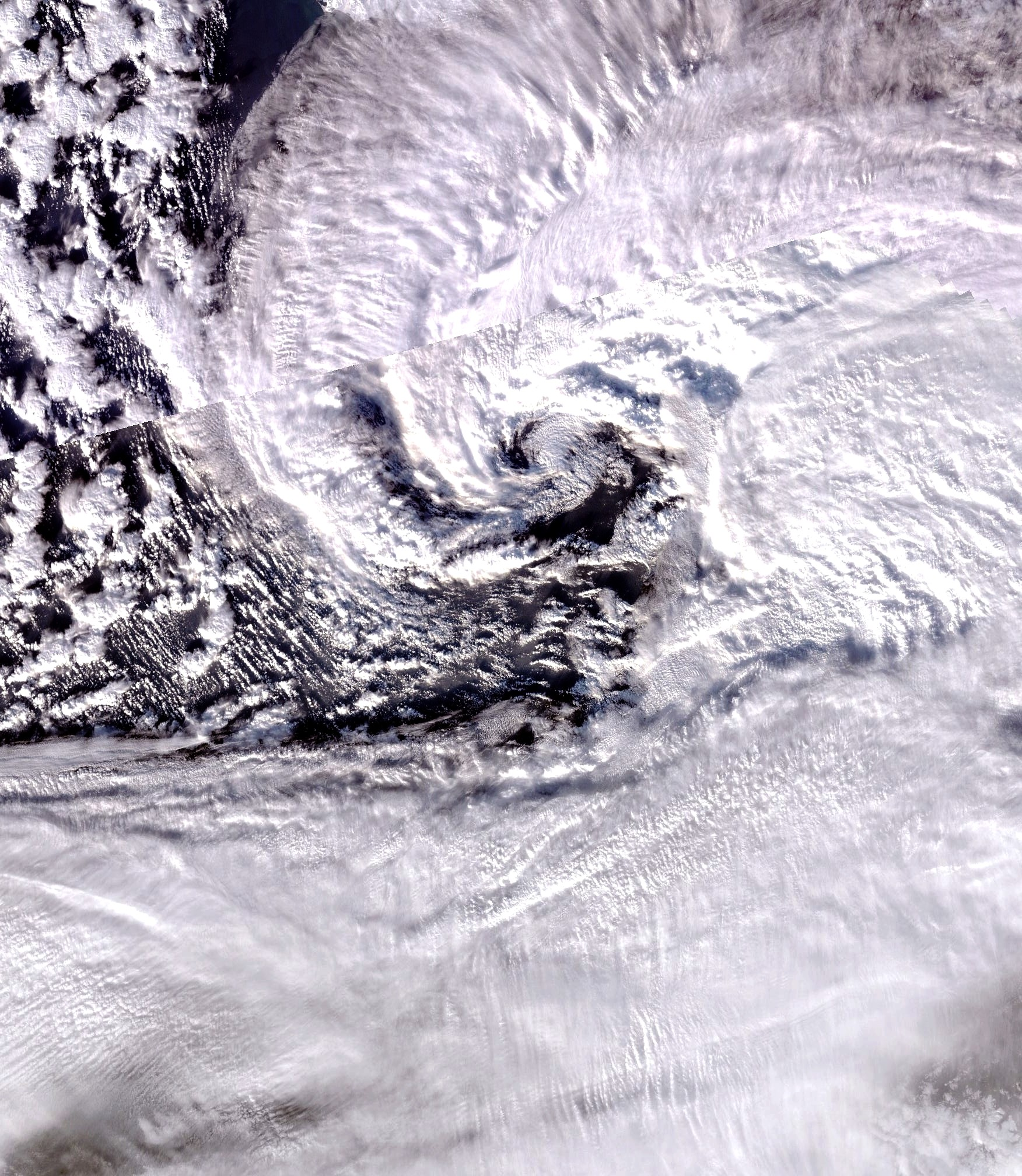
- Storm Ingunn, the strongest system of the season
- First storm formed: 25 September 2023 (Storm Agnes)
- Last storm dissipated: 24 August 2024 (Storm Lilian)
- Strongest storm^{1}: Storm Ingunn 941 hPa (27.79 inHg)
- Strongest wind gust: Storm Ingunn 249 km/h (155 mph) at Landsverk weather station, Heltnin, Faroe Islands
- Total storms: 44
- Total fatalities: 77 (2)
- ^{1}Strongest storm is determined by lowest pressure and maximum recorded non-mountainous wind gust is also included for reference.

The 2023–2024 European windstorm season was the ninth season of the European windstorm naming in Europe. It comprised a year, from 1 September 2023 to 31 August 2024. This was the fifth season in which the Netherlands participated (through KNMI), alongside the United Kingdom's Met Office and Ireland's Met Éireann in the western group. The Portuguese, Spanish, French and Belgian meteorological agencies collaborated for the seventh time, joined by Luxembourg's agency (Southwestern group). This was the third season in which Greece, Israel and Cyprus (Eastern Mediterranean group), and Italy, Slovenia, Croatia, Montenegro, North Macedonia and Malta (Central Mediterranean group) named storms which affected their areas.

== Background and naming ==
=== Definitions and naming conventions ===
There is no universal definition of what constitutes a windstorm in Europe, nor is there a universally accepted system of naming storms. For example, in the Western Group, consisting of the UK, Ireland, and the Netherlands, a storm is named if one of the meteorological agencies in those countries issues an orange warning (amber in the UK), which generally requires a likelihood of widespread sustained wind speeds greater than 65 km/h (40 mph), or widespread wind gust speeds over 110 km/h (70 mph). (Required wind speeds vary slightly by agency and by season.) Both the likelihood of impact and the potential severity of the system are considered when naming a storm. The Southwest Group of Spain, Portugal, and France share a similar storm-naming scheme, though their names differ from those used by the Western Group. In Greece, however, naming criteria were established for storms when the storm's forecast winds are above 50 km/h (30 mph) over land, with the wind expected to have a significant impact to infrastructures. In Denmark, a windstorm must have an hourly average windspeed of at least 90 km/h (55 mph).

The Meteorology Department of the Free University of Berlin (FUB) names all high and low pressure systems that affect Europe, though they do not assign names to any actual storms. A windstorm that is associated with one of these pressure systems will at times be recognized by the name assigned to the associated pressure system by the FUB. Named windstorms that have been recognized by a European meteorological agency are described in this article.

Naming conventions used in Europe are generally based on conditions that are forecast, not conditions that have actually occurred, as public awareness and preparedness are often cited as the main purpose of the naming schemes–for example, a reference. Therefore, an assignment of a storm name does not mean that a storm will actually develop.

=== Western Group (United Kingdom, Ireland and the Netherlands) ===
In 2015, the Met Office and Met Éireann announced a project to name storms as part of the "Name our Storms" project for windstorms and asked the public for suggestions. The meteorological offices produced a full list of names for 2015–2016 through 2017–2018, common to both the United Kingdom and Ireland, with the Netherlands taking part from 2019 onwards. Names in the United Kingdom will be based on the National Severe Weather Warning Service.

The following names were chosen for the 2023–2024 season in the United Kingdom, Ireland, and the Netherlands. For a windstorm to be named, the United Kingdom's Met Office, Ireland's Met Eireann, or the Netherlands' Royal Netherlands Meteorological Institute (KNMI) have to issue an amber weather warning, preferably for wind, but a storm can also be named for amber warnings of rain and snow (e.g. Storm Arwen in 2021).

- Agnes
- Babet
- Ciarán
- Debi
- Elin
- Fergus
- Gerrit
- Henk
- Isha
- Jocelyn
- Kathleen
- Lilian
- Minnie (unused)
- Nicholas (unused)
- Olga (unused)
- Piet (unused)
- Regina (unused)
- Stuart (unused)
- Tamiko (unused)
- Vincent (unused)
- Walid (unused)

=== South-Western Group (France, Spain, Portugal, Belgium and Luxembourg) ===
This was the seventh year in which the meteorological agencies of France, Spain and Portugal named storms that affected their areas.

- Aline
- Bernard
- Celine
- Domingos
- Elisa
- Frederico
- Geraldine
- Hipolito
- Irene
- Juan
- Karlotta
- Louis
- Monica
- Nelson
- Olivia
- Pierrick
- Renata
- Sancho (unused)
- Tatiana (unused)
- Vasco (unused)
- Wilhelmina (unused)

=== Central Mediterranean Group (Italy, Slovenia, Croatia, Bosnia & Herzegovina, Montenegro, North Macedonia and Malta) ===
The following names were chosen for the 2023–2024 season in Italy, Slovenia, Croatia, Bosnia & Herzegovina, Montenegro, North Macedonia and Malta.

- Alexis
- Bettina
- Ciro
- Dorothea
- Emil
- Fedra
- Gori
- Helga (unused)
- Italo (unused)
- Lilith (unused)
- Marco (unused)
- Nada (unused)
- Ole (unused)
- Palmira (unused)
- Rocky (unused)
- Shirlene (unused)
- Tino (unused)
- Ute (unused)
- Vito (unused)
- Zena (unused)

=== Eastern Mediterranean Group (Greece, Israel and Cyprus) ===
The Eastern Mediterranean Group works slightly differently compared to other naming lists; instead of ending a season on 31 August of that year, they end the season on 30 September of that year. These are the names that were chosen for the 2023–24 season in Greece, Israel and Cyprus.

- Avgi
- Ben (unused)
- Cornelius (unused)
- Doros (unused)
- Eden (unused)
- Fedra (unused)
- Gea (unused)
- Hillel (unused)
- Iris (unused)
- Kerean (unused)
- Leonidas (unused)
- Maria (unused)
- Nir (unused)
- Olympias (unused)
- Petros (unused)
- Qamar (unused)
- Raphael (unused)
- Sofia (unused)
- Tal (unused)
- Urania (unused)
- Viran (unused)
- Widad (unused)
- Xenophon (unused)
- Yakinthi (unused)
- Ziv (unused)

=== Northern and North-Western Group (Denmark, Iceland, Norway and Sweden) ===
This naming group, like the naming from the Free University of Berlin, does not use a naming list but names storms when it has not received a name by any other meteorological service in Europe and is projected to affect Denmark, Iceland, Norway or Sweden.

- Pia
- Ingunn

=== Central/FUB naming Group (Germany, Switzerland, Austria, Poland, Czech Republic, Slovakia and Hungary) ===
Like the Northern Group, the Free University of Berlin names storms based on low pressures across the continent and does not use a naming list. The storms listed below were strong enough or were anticipated to cause equal or more disruption than if it were named either by one of the other groups.

- Oliver
- Brigitta
- Gabriele
- Patricia
- Radha

== Season summary ==
EUMETNET groups naming lists by colour

Western group
South-western group
Northern & North-western group
FUB naming group
Central Mediterranean group
North-eastern group
South-eastern group
Eastern Mediterranean group

All storms named by European meteorological organisations in their respective forecasting areas, as well as Atlantic hurricanes that transitioned into European windstorms and retained the name assigned by the National Hurricane Center:

== Storms ==
=== Storm Agnes (Kilian) ===
Storm Agnes
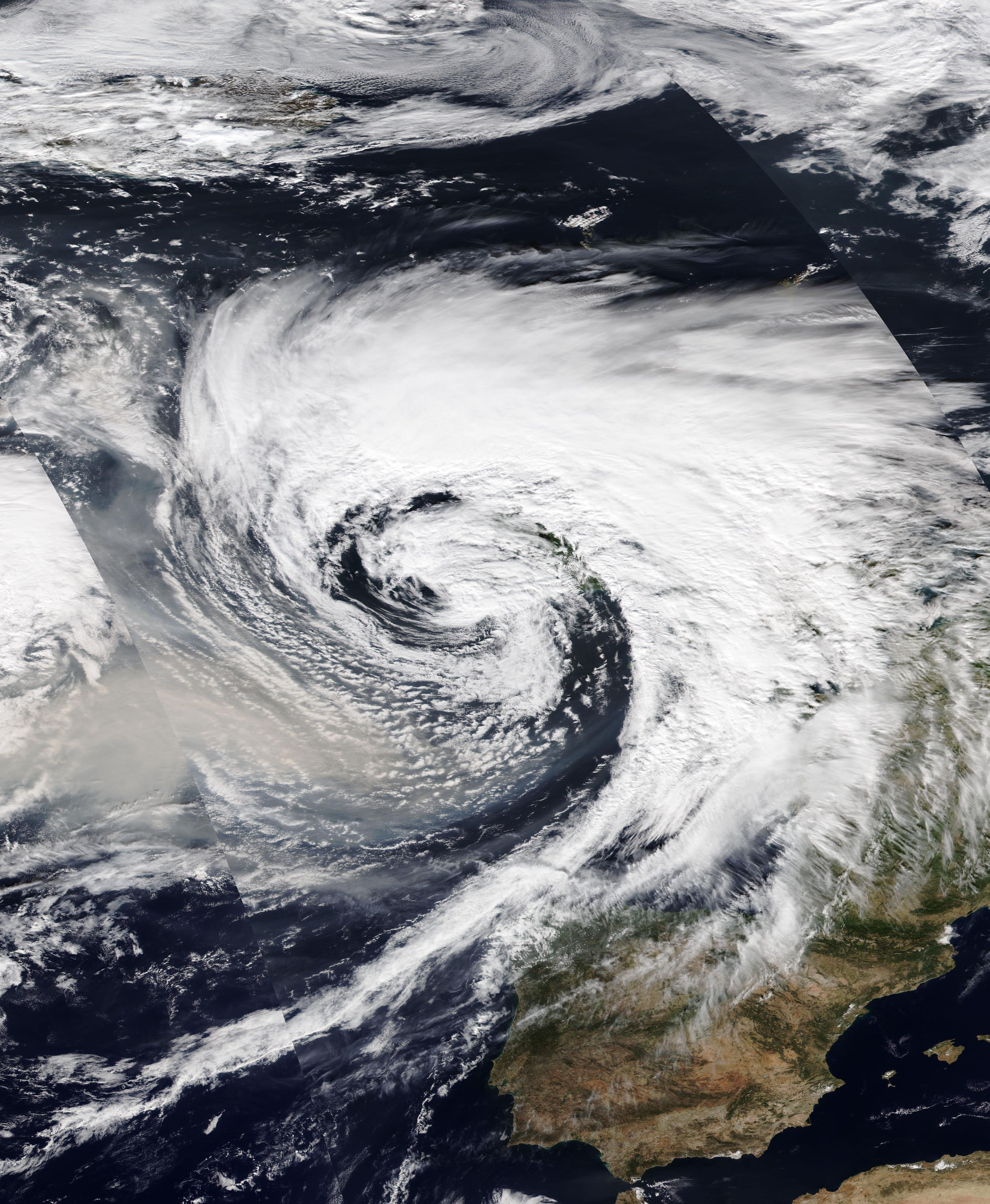
- Area affected: Ireland, United Kingdom
- Date of impact: 25–29 September 2023
- Maximum wind gust: 135 km/h (84 mph): Capel Curig, Wales: 27 September 2023
- Lowest pressure: 970 hPa (28.64 inHg)
- Fatalities: 0
- Damage: Unspecified

Storm Agnes was named by the UK's Met Office on 25 September 2023 and was forecast to bring strong winds and heavy rain to much of the UK and Ireland. The storm, which was also named Kilian by the Free University of Berlin and the Deutscher Wetterdienst, impacted the British Isles on 27 September.

=== Storm Babet (Viktor) ===
Storm Babet
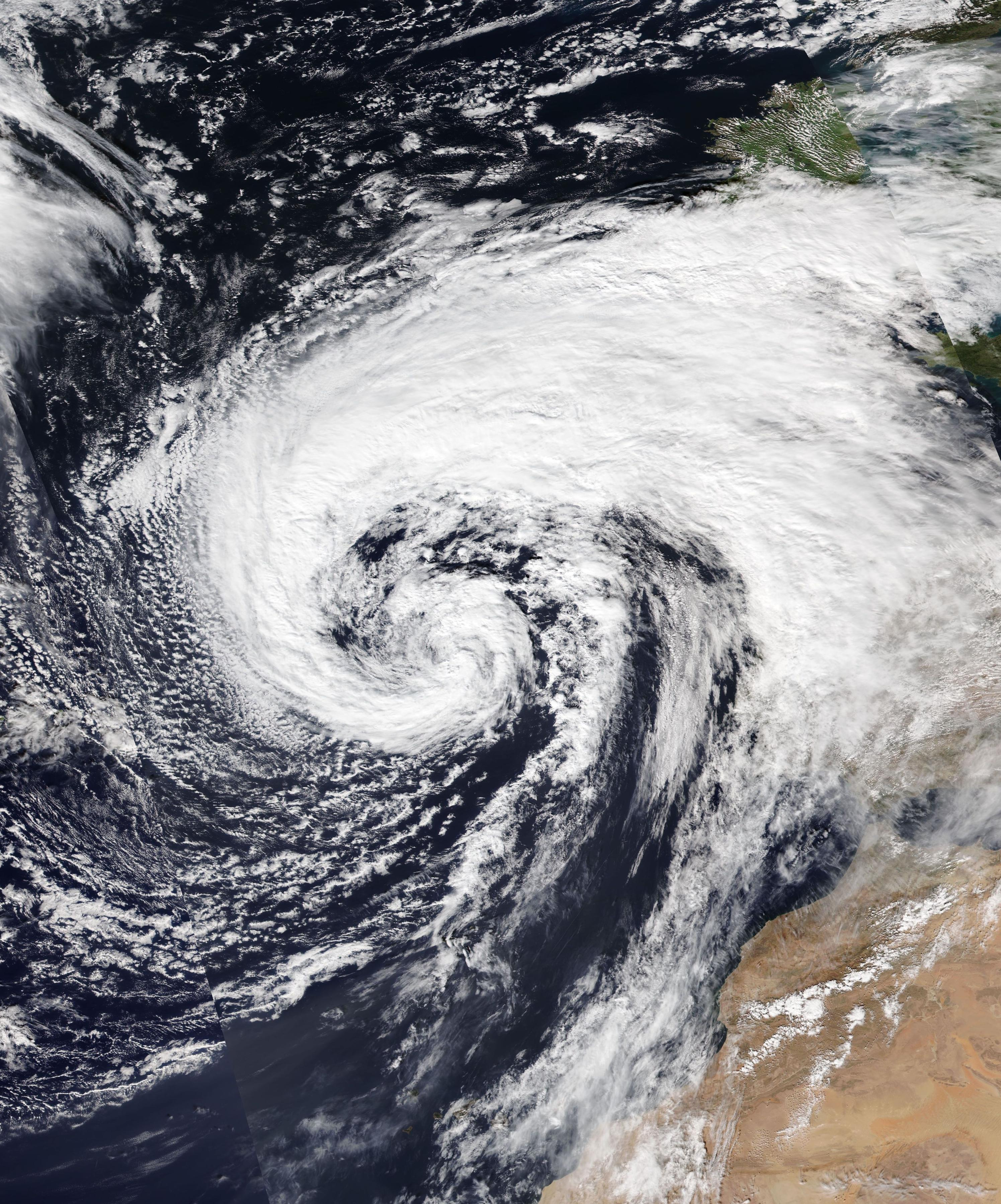
- Area affected: Spain, Portugal, France, Ireland, United Kingdom, Germany, Denmark, Sweden
- Date of impact: 16–22 October 2023
- Maximum wind gust: 185 km/h (115 mph) at Cairn Gorm Summit, Scotland on 19 October 2023
- Lowest pressure: 976 hPa (28.82 inHg)
- Fatalities: 15 (1)
- Power outages: 55,000 (England), 27,000 (Scotland)
- Damage: €691 million (US$732 million)

Storm Babet, which was named by the United Kingdom's Met Office on 16 October, and named Viktor by the Free University of Berlin, affected large parts of western and northern Europe. It first affected Portugal and southwestern Spain with strong winds, heavy rains and floods on 16–17 October, subsequently moving to northern Europe. The Met Office issued several yellow rain and wind warnings for large parts of the UK, along with amber rain warnings for parts of northeastern England and Scotland. A rare red weather warning was issued for eastern parts of Scotland.

Met Éireann issued Yellow rain warnings for most of Ireland. An orange rain warning for southwestern Ireland was also issued, and there was flooding in the south of the Island, especially the east of County Cork; Midleton was particularly badly hit.

A rare red warning for rainfall was issued across portions of eastern Scotland by the Met Office on 19 October. A wind gust of 124 km/h (77 mph) was registered at the coast in Inverbervie. In the highlands, Cairn Gorm summit recorded a gust of 185 km/h (115 mph). In Brechin, Scotland, residents were asked to evacuate their homes by the local council.

In Denmark, southern Sweden and northern Germany, the wind caused some material damages, fallen trees and cancellations of ferries, trains and planes, but the most serious effect was a storm surge, with large amounts of seawater being pushed by the wind into the westernmost Baltic Sea and Danish Straits (unlike floods in Great Britain, Ireland and the Iberian Peninsula that primarily were caused by heavy rain). In parts of Denmark (southeastern Jutland, southern Funen, southern Zealand and smaller islands in the area) and Germany (eastern Schleswig-Holstein), it caused the highest floods in more than a century, with some places in Denmark having sea levels that were up to 2.39 m (7 ft 10 in) above normal and in the Germany up to 2.22 m (7 ft 3 in) above normal. In certain, particularly exposed places, people were evacuated after levees broke and houses were flooded. On the opposite, western side of Jutland and Schleswig-Holstein, the waters were forced away from the shore by the wind, with sea levels up to 3 m (9.8 ft) below normal, stranding boats and preventing several ferries from running because of insufficient water depths. This flooding was unusual because it was caused by easterly winds and mainly impacted the westernmost Baltic Sea. In Denmark and Germany, large storm floods are most often caused by westerly stoms where the greatest impact is on the southeastern North Sea, which has coastlines that are far better protected by taller, more extensive levees and other systems.

There were at least six recorded fatalities: a 57-year-old woman died after being swept into a river in Angus (Scotland), a 56-year-old man died after his van hit a tree near Forfar in Angus, a man in his 60s was killed after being swept away by flood waters near Cleobury Mortimer (England), a 33-year-old woman was killed on the German island of Fehmarn when her car was hit by a falling tree, and a woman in her 80s in Chesterfield died in floods. A man trapped in a vehicle in floodwater near the Aberdeenshire village of Marykirk was later found dead.

Damage in Schleswig-Holstein was estimated to be 200 million Euro.

=== Storm Aline (Wolfgang) ===
Storm Aline
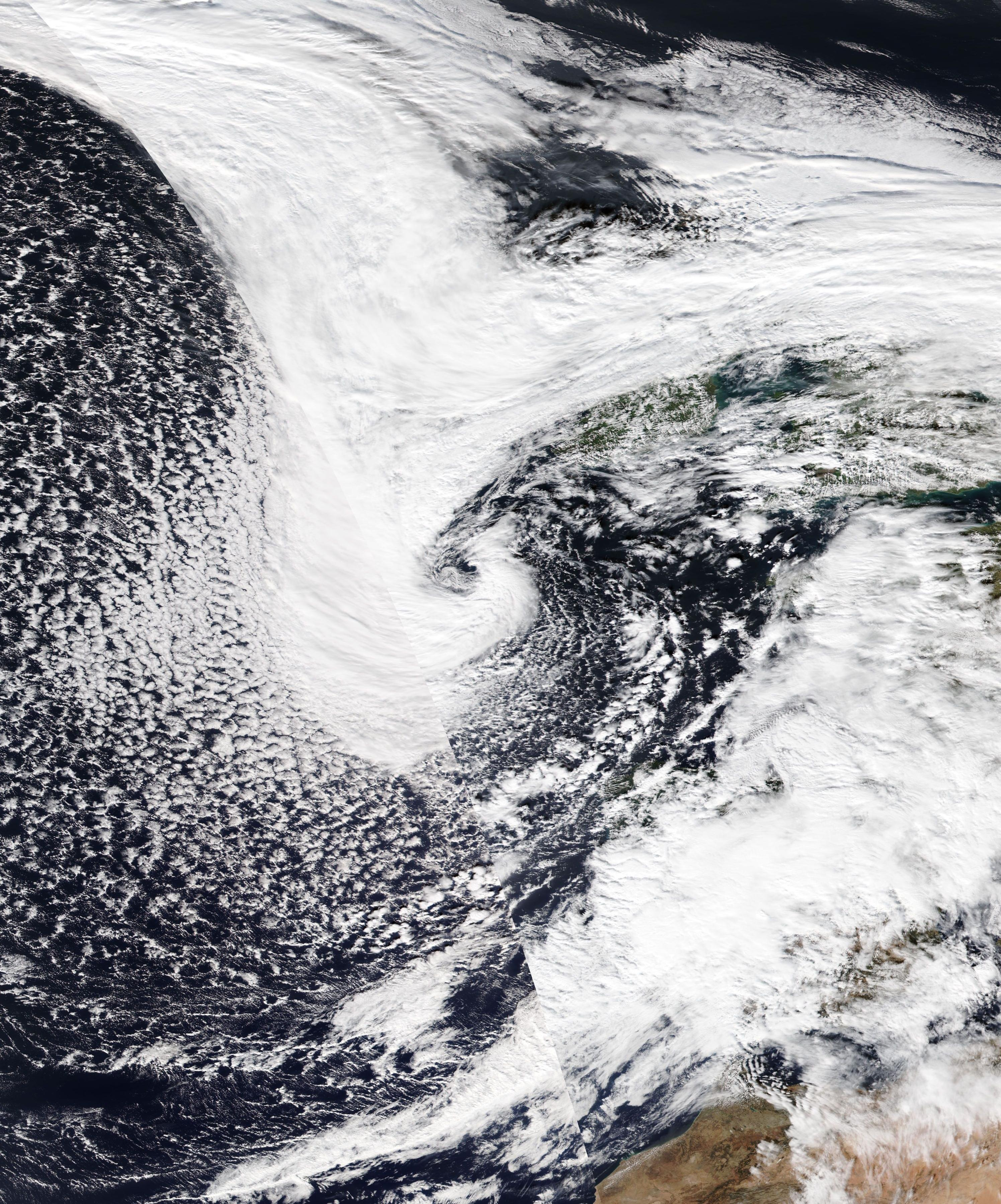
- Area affected: Iberian Peninsula, Portugal, Spain, France, Jersey, Guernsey, Belgium, Switzerland, Italy
- Date of impact: 18–27 October 2023
- Maximum wind gust: 146 km/h (90 mph), Quiberon, France, 20 October 2023
- Lowest pressure: 966 hPa (28.53 inHg)
- Fatalities: 0
- Power outages: Unspecified
- Damage: Unspecified

Storm Aline was named by Spain's state weather forecast agency AEMET, while Wolfgang was the name given by the Free University of Berlin both on 18 October 2023. The storm caused heavy rainfall across several parts of Spain and France. More than 20 flights were diverted from Málaga Airport and a gust of 100 km/h (60 mph) was reported in Cabrera.

=== Storm Bernard (Xanthos) ===
Storm Bernard
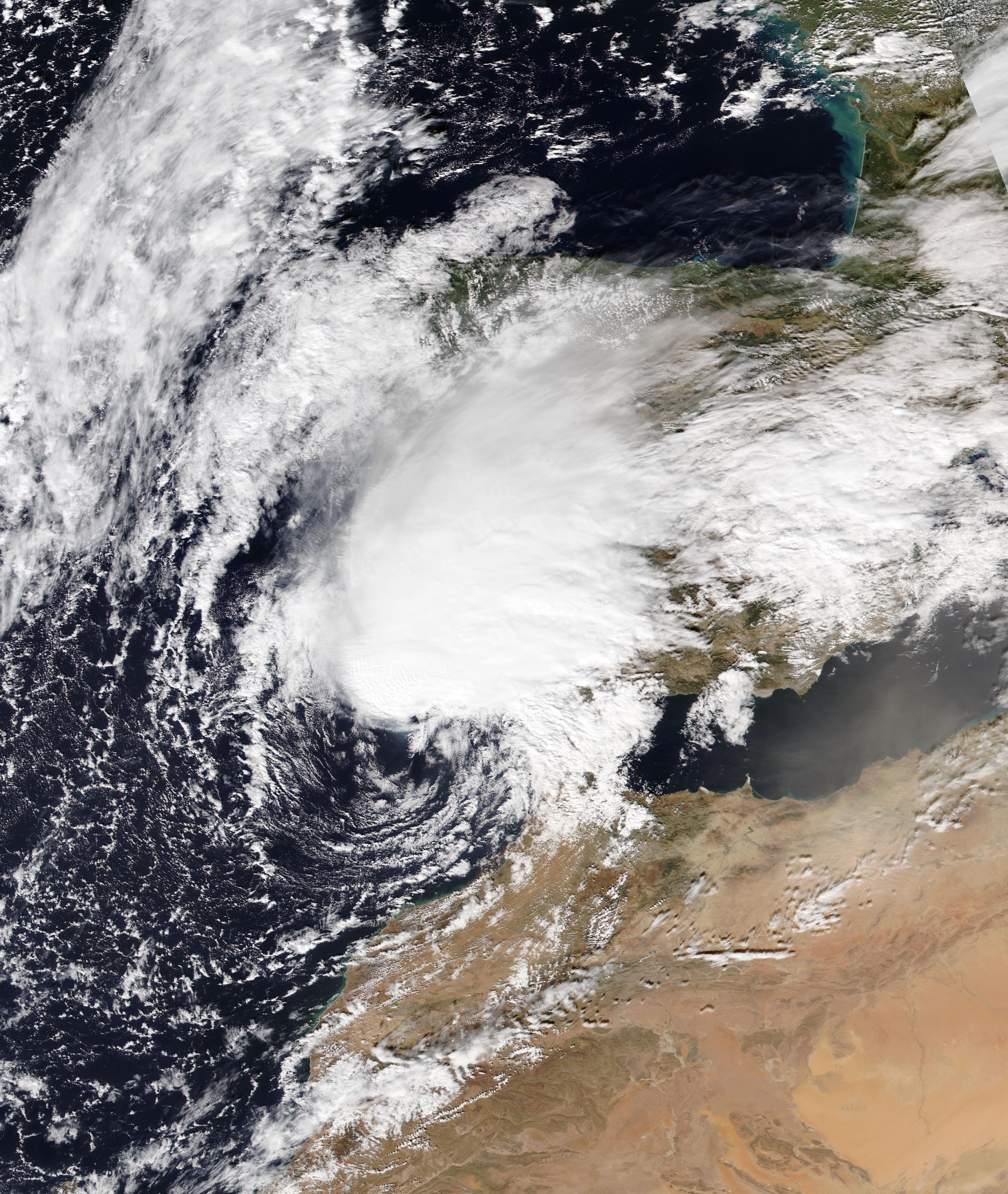
- Area affected: Morocco, Iberian Peninsula, France, United Kingdom, Portugal, Spain
- Date of impact: 21–26 October 2023
- Lowest pressure: 986 hPa (29.12 inHg)
- Fatalities: 2
- Power outages: Unspecified
- Damage: Unspecified

Storm Bernard was named by the Portuguese Institute of the Sea and Atmosphere (IPMA) on 22 October 2023, but the Free University of Berlin noticed and named this system Xanthos on 21 October 2023 instead.

The system impacted Spain and Portugal, prompting the issuance of yellow rain warnings.

=== Storm Celine (Benj) ===
Storm Celine
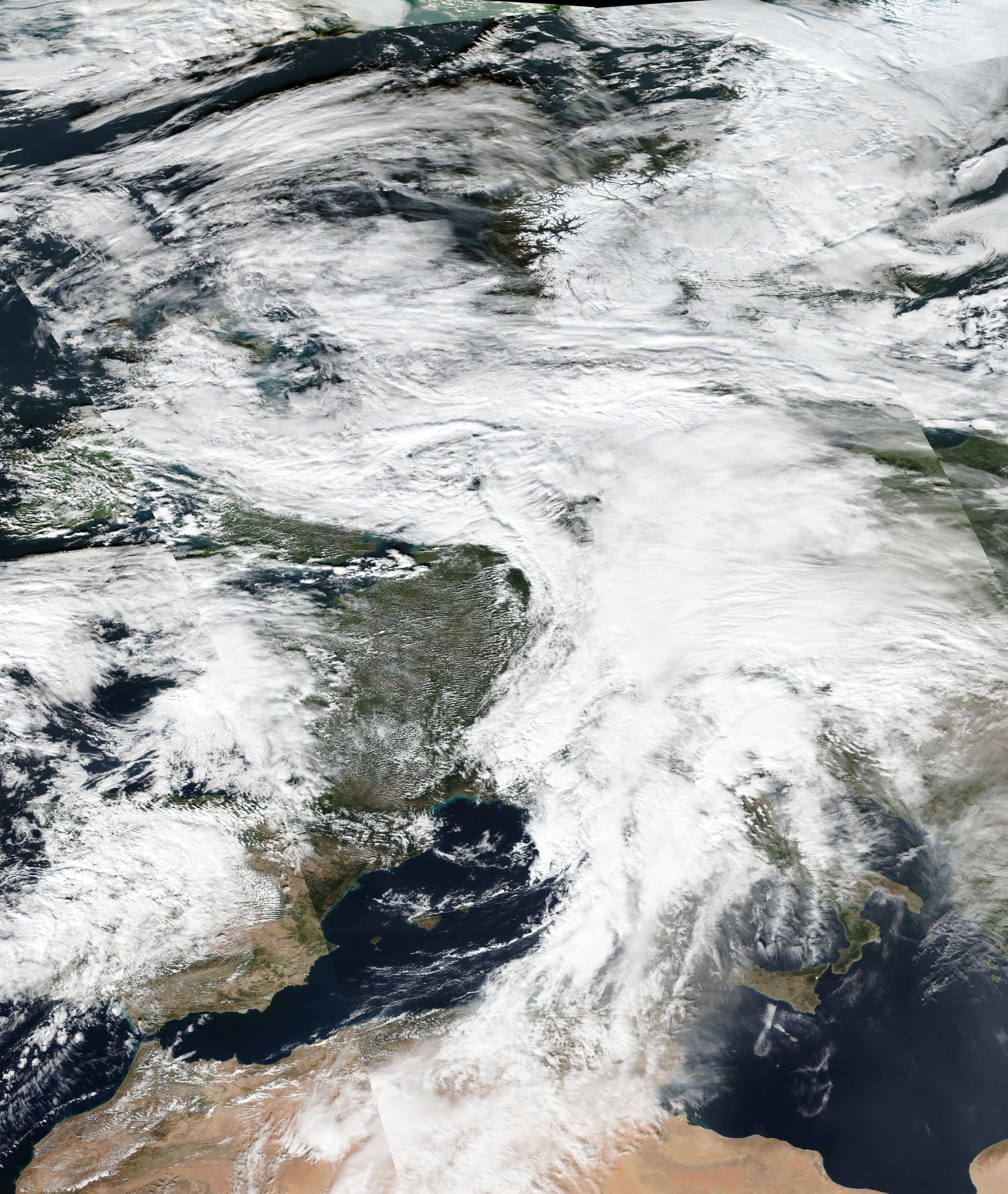
- Area affected: Portugal, Spain, France, Iberian Peninsula
- Date of impact: 28 October – 3 November 2023
- Lowest pressure: 977 hPa (28.85 inHg)
- Fatalities: 1
- Damage: Unspecified

Storm Celine was named and reported on 28 October 2023 by the Portuguese Institute of the Sea and Atmosphere (IPMA), at around 1 pm local time that same afternoon. The cold front moved south, causing heavy rain accompanied by thunderstorms. IPMA also predicted wind gusts as high as 90 km/h (55 mph) in the highlands and waves up to 6 m in height.

The storm passed through central Portugal on 29 October. By 30 October, it had swept through southern Portugal and prompted yellow weather warnings for heavy rain in nine provinces in five autonomous communities in Spain. Weather warning were issued in western France until 31 October.

One death was reported: a 70-year-old woman was killed by a falling tree in France on 29 October.

=== Storm Ciarán (Emir) ===
Storm Ciarán
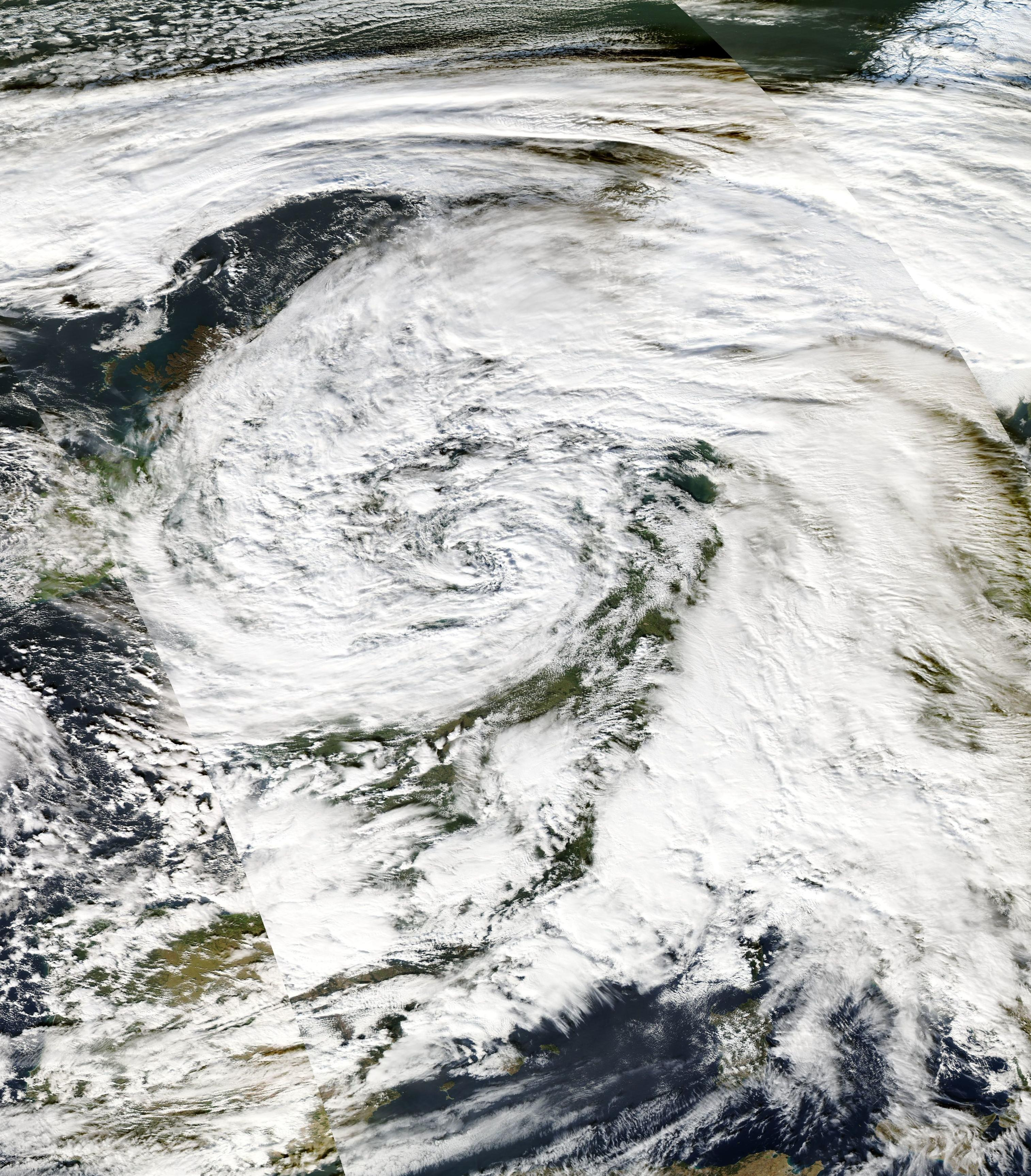
- Area affected: Ireland, United Kingdom, Benelux, France, Spain, Czech Republic, Italy, Channel Islands
- Date of impact: 29 October – 4 November 2023
- Maximum wind gust: 207 km/h (129 mph), Pointe du raz, France: 2 November 2023
- Lowest pressure: 951 hPa (28.08 inHg)
- Fatalities: 15
- Power outages: 1,305,000
- Damage: US$2.22 billion

Storm Ciarán was named by the United Kingdom's Met Office on 29 October, while the Free University of Berlin gave this system Emir on 30 October 2023. It was expected to bring winds of 90 to 120 km/h (56 to 75 mph) widely with > 130 km/h (80 mph) on some coasts. More heavy rainfall was expected to fall which would exacerbate the flooding from Storm Babet a week prior. A large yellow weather warning for rain and wind was placed for the South Wales, Devon and Cornwall, south coast and the east coast of East Anglia. In Cornwall, 4,000 properties were left without power. In Devon, 250 schools were closed. In Dorset, the Freshwater Beach Holiday Park at Burton Bradstock was destroyed. Other places in Dorset affected included Loders, Easton and West Bay. A caravan park at Tenby in Wales was evacuated due to flooding.

The Met Office stated Storm Ciarán was undergoing explosive cyclogenesis on 1 November. The storm especially affected the Isle of Jersey, where a supercell thunderstorm spawned an IF3/T6 tornado alongside golfball sized hail. Wind speeds on the island reached around over 160 km/h (100 mph). The southern coast of England and France were severely affected by the storm, with record wind gusts in France being reported around 208 km/h (129 mph). The storm also caused flooding and huge waves. An IF3 tornado also touched down in Bulgaria.

In the Netherlands, an orange weather warning was given for the coastal provinces for high winds. Events were cancelled, including the Dutch Headwind Cycling Championships at the last minute due to safety. There was a lot of disruption due to cancelled flights and trains. People were advised to work from home, and to not drive unless absolutely necessary.

There were 15 fatalities as a result of the storm. A 46-year-old woman died in Germany when a tree fell on her. There were two deaths in Belgium, a 5-year-old child and a 64-year-old woman from falling branches. A 23-year-old woman died in Spain from a fallen tree. In France two deaths were reported, including a 72-year-old man who was blown off his balcony. And in the Netherlands a person was killed when a tree fell on their car. Six more died in Italy, and one in Albania.

Six people were killed during heavy rains in the region of Tuscany, Italy, with rivers flooding and causing damage. Several roads and highways are closed amid landslides. Severe damage also occurred in Campobasso, Molise, evacuations were being made in Veneto with highways being closed, and emergency calls occurred in Rome. In Sardinia, strong winds fueled fires that burned hectares of vegetation, while a man was killed in Capoterra, and in Tortolì an entire sawmill burned down.

In total there were more than 1 million power outages; in Cornwall around 4,000 properties were left without power. Damage assessed by PERLIS was finalized at €2.067 billion (US$2.22 billion).

=== Storm Domingos (Fred) ===
Storm Domingos
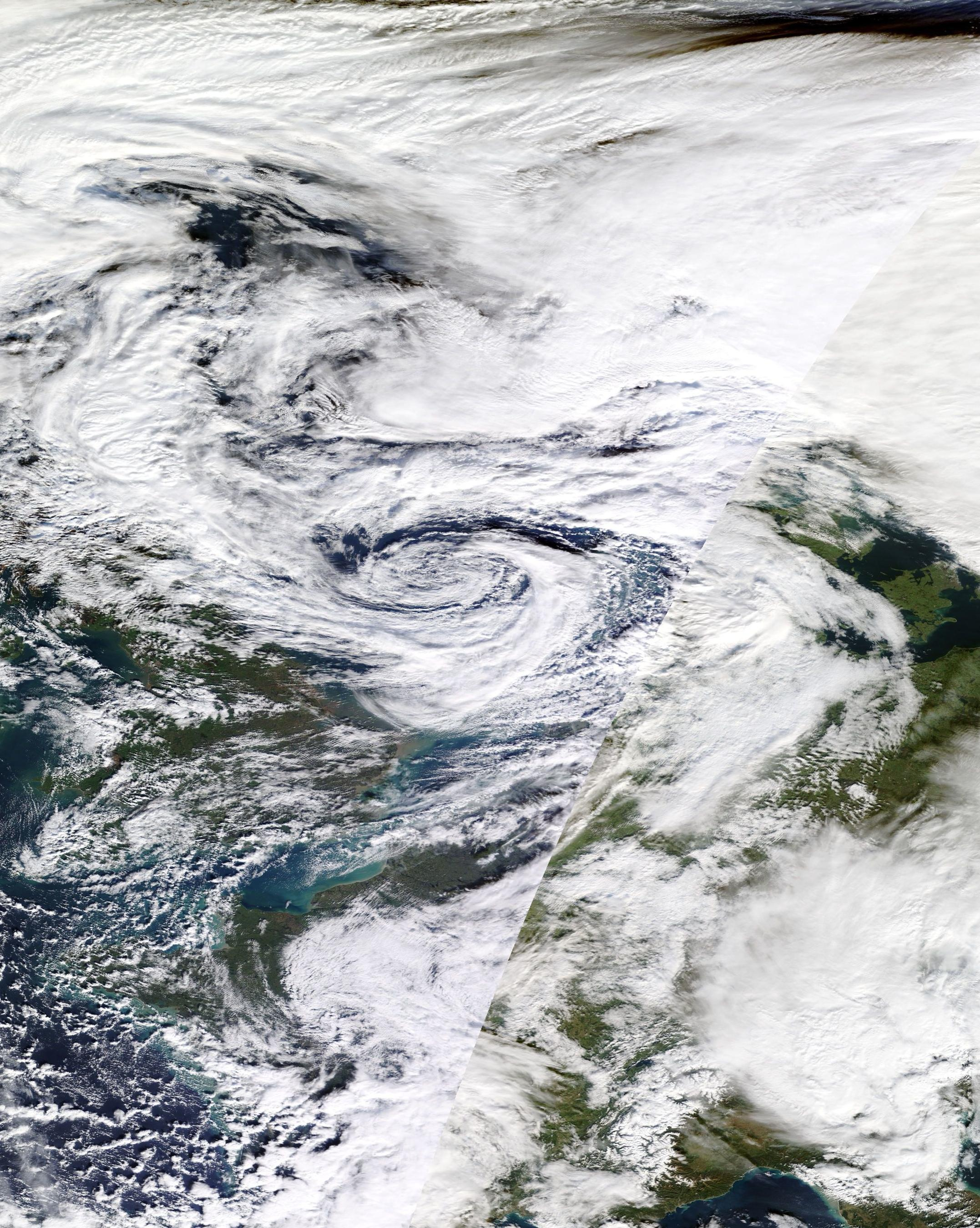
- Area affected: Portugal, Spain, France, United Kingdom, Ireland, Belgium, Channel Islands (indirectly), Iberia, Andalusia, Balearic Islands
- Date of impact: 3–5 November 2023
- Lowest pressure: 960 hPa (28.35 inHg)
- Fatalities: 1
- Damage: Unspecified

Storm Domingos was named and reported on 3 November 2023 by the Spanish Met Service (AEMET). The storm was subsequently named Fred by the Free University of Berlin on 4 November 2023 at 12:00 UTC. It was expected to bring strong winds to France, Spain and Portugal with wind warnings in force for parts of those countries. The United Kingdom had a yellow rain warning for the south coast, issued by the Met Office.

One death was reported; an employee from Enedis was killed in the French region of Brittany, on 5 November 2023.

=== Storm Elisa (Helmoe) ===
Storm Elisa
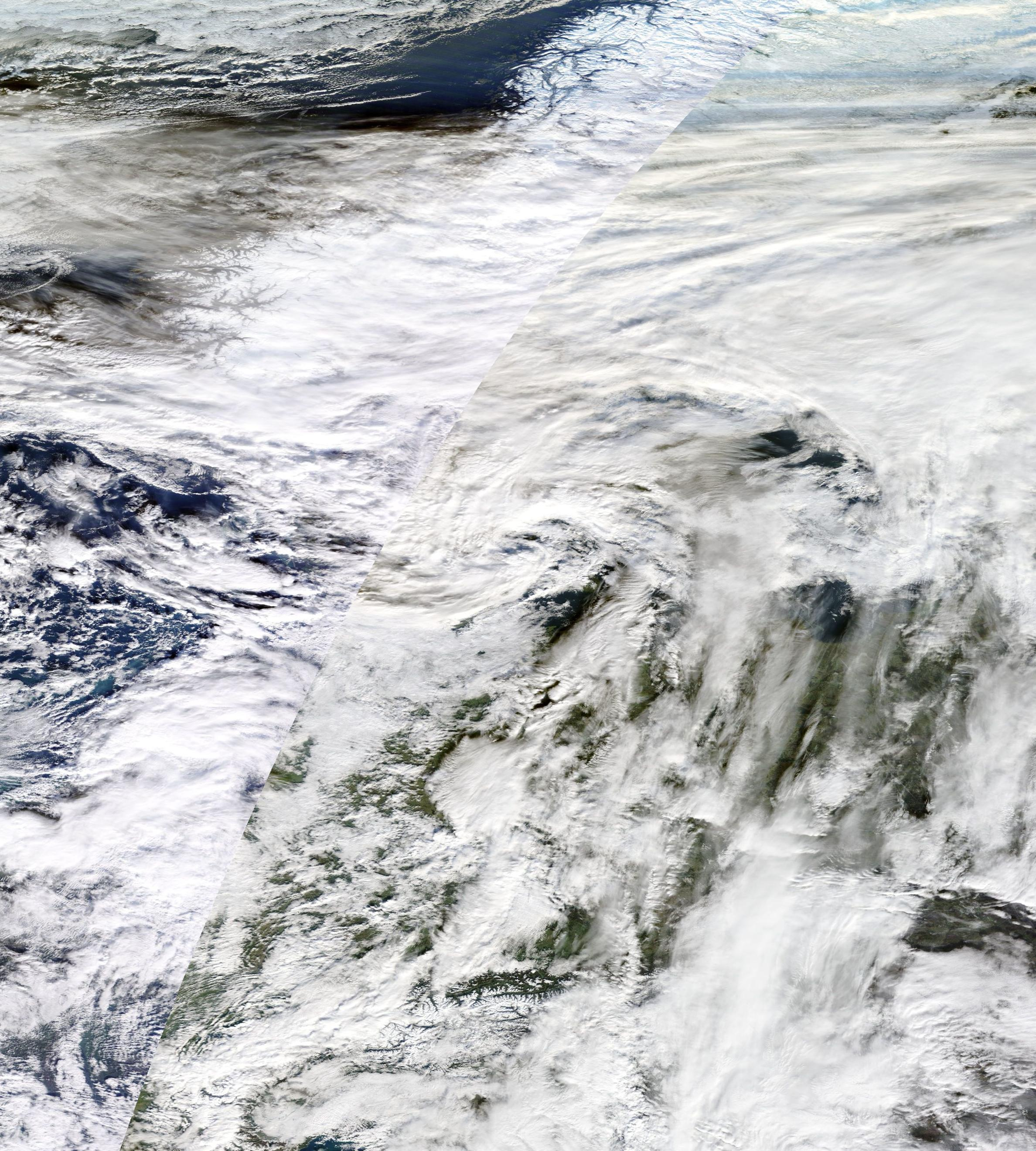
- Area affected: France, Channel Islands, Ireland
- Date of impact: 9–11 November 2023
- Lowest pressure: 988 hPa (29.18 inHg)
- Damage: Unspecified

Storm Elisa was identified by Météo-France on 9 November 2023, while the Free University of Berlin named this system Helmoe the very next day.

Heavy rain was forecast to fall in northern France between Le Havre and Calais with 80–100 millimetres to fall in the region. This caused rivers to burst their banks, causing some flooding, with 20–50 more widely.

No deaths were recorded from Storm Elisa.

=== Storm Debi ===
Storm Debi
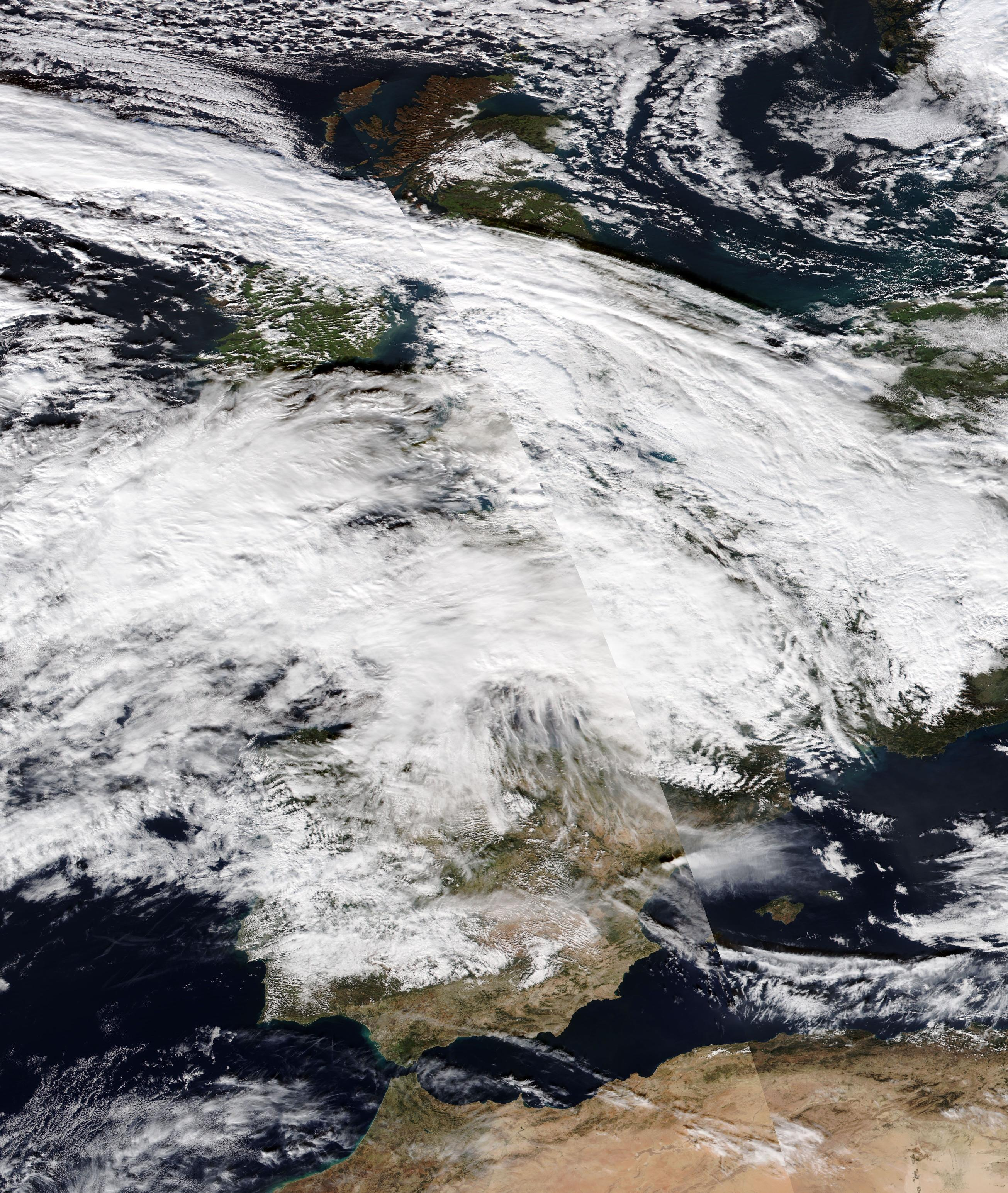
- Area affected: Ireland, United Kingdom, Netherlands
- Date of impact: 12–13 November 2023
- Maximum wind gust: 90 mph (140 km/h; 78 kn) at North Pennines, England
- Lowest pressure: 971 hPa (28.67 inHg)
- Fatalities: 0 (1 injured by flying debris in County Limerick)
- Power outages: 100,000
- Damage: Unspecified

Storm Debi was identified by Met Éireann on 12 November 2023, while the Free University of Berlin will not be issuing a name for this system as it neither impacted Denmark, Sweden nor Norway. It heavily impacted Ireland on 12 November (Sunday night), before it made its way to the United Kingdom on 13 November (Monday morning).

Met Éireann placed in effect a red wind warning for 14 counties: Kerry, Limerick, Tipperary, Clare, east Galway, south Roscommon, Dublin, Kildare, Laois, Louth, Meath, Wicklow, Offaly, and Westmeath, and yellow and orange wind and rain warnings for the rest of the country.

The Met Office issued a yellow wind warning for regions of East Midlands, North East England, North West England, Wales, West Midlands (region), Yorkshire, Humber, Midlands, Tayside, Fife and Grampian.

The Tornado and Storm Research Organization issued a tornado watch for much of Ireland, Wales, Midlands and East Anglia on Sunday evening, starting from midnight to midday Monday.

On Monday morning 13 November, the storm reached the Netherlands.

=== Storm Frederico (Linus) ===
Storm Frederico
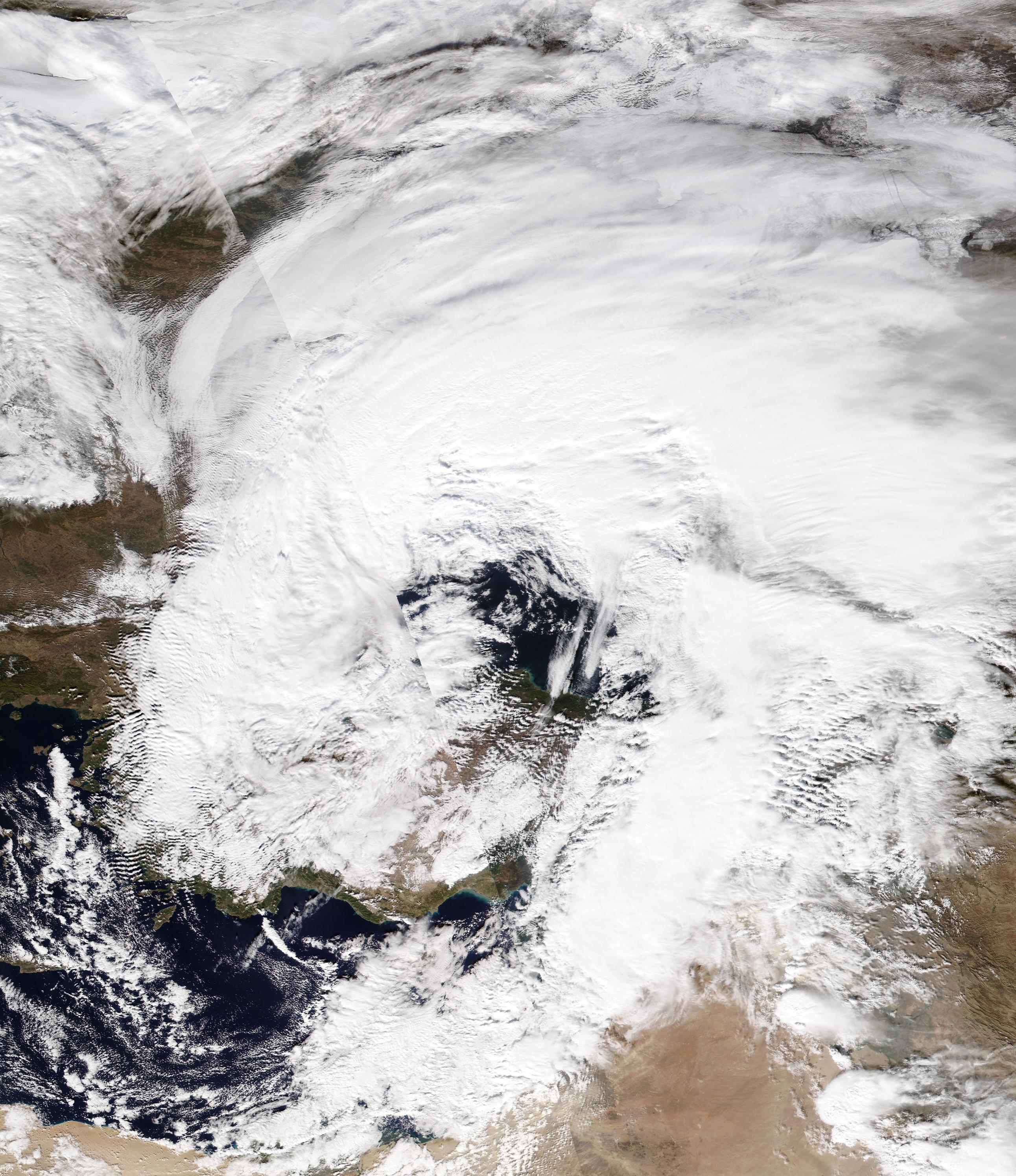
- Area affected: France, United Kingdom, Channel Islands, Belgium, Germany, Switzerland, Poland, Czech Republic, Slovakia, Hungary, Turkey, Moldova, Ukraine, Romania, Serbia, Bulgaria, Israel, Cyprus, Syria, Georgia, Armenia
- Date of impact: 15–21 November 2023
- Lowest pressure: 998 hPa (29.47 inHg)
- Fatalities: 2 (last confirmed information in Bulgaria)
- Damage: Unspecified

Storm Frederico was identified by Météo-France on 15 November 2023 around 17:50 CET as a new depression, and the Free University of Berlin announced on 16 November 2023 that this system would be named Linus. Météo-France predicted this system would travel from the Gulf of Saint-Malo towards the north of Germany, on morning of 16 November 2023 would be near the Channel Islands, and by the night, strong gales would reach Provence and Corsica. overnight with significant gusts between 110 km/h and 120 km/h (70 to 75 mph)

The Met Office issued yellow rain warnings in association with the storm system for the south coast of England and Wales, where flooding was possible. It was also reported that Météo-France had placed 55 departments on yellow alert, including Île-de-France.

The system then tracked through southeastern central parts of Europe, bringing heavy rain and strong winds to the Balkans and southern Black Sea coasts such as Turkey. Orange and yellow wind and snow warnings were put up for parts of the Balkans, particularly, Romania Serbia and Bulgaria. The system brought heavy rain and some snowfall to western parts of Turkey. The eastern Mediterranean was forecast to also be impacted by Frederico, with yellow flood warnings for parts of Israel and an orange 'coastal event' warning issued. The storm moved out of Europe by 21 November 2023.

=== Storm Alexis ===
Storm Alexis
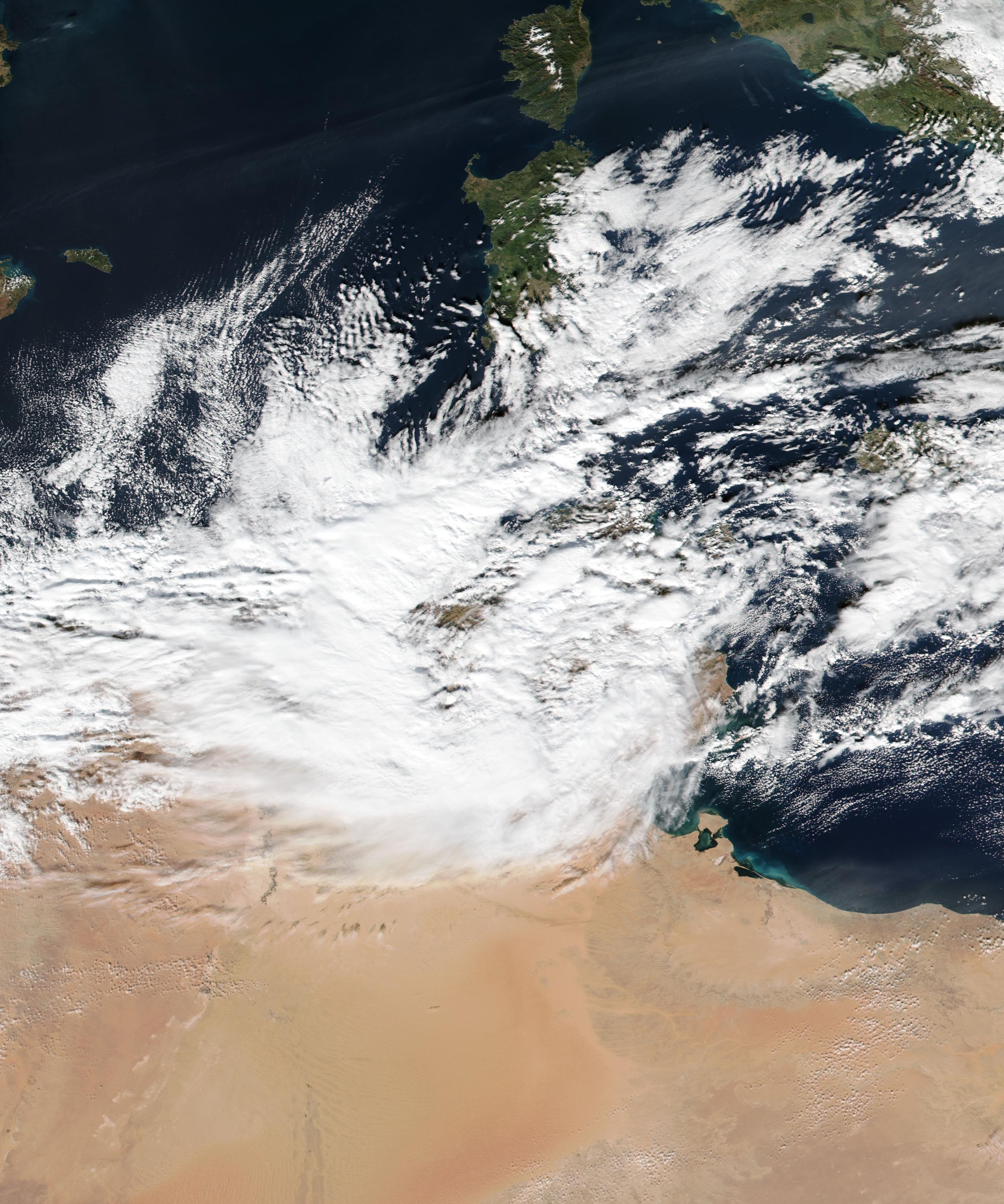
- Area affected: Italy (especially Sicily, Lampedusa, Pantelleria), Algeria, Egypt, Libya, Tunisia, Malta, Albania, Bosnia and Herzegovina, Bulgaria, Croatia, Kosovo, Montenegro, North Macedonia, Romania, Serbia, Slovenia
- Date of impact: 22–24 November 2023
- Lowest pressure: 998 hPa (29.47 inHg)
- Fatalities: 0
- Power outages: Unspecified
- Damage: Unspecified

Though a weak and small system, Storm Alexis was assigned by the Italian Servizio Meteorologico, on 22 November 2023. The storm was assigned for potential flash flooding due to heavy rain with orange warnings.

It was also predicted that Alexis would turn into an anticyclone by 24 November 2023, Friday.

The national meteorological service predicted the arrival of a cold air mass from Scandinavia, heading straight down for Central Mediterranean and the Balkans, which would result in a drastic temperature drop, especially in countries on the Adriatic side. This cold spell was also exacerbated by the formation and naming of the next storm, Storm Bettina.

=== Storm Bettina (Phil) ===
Storm Bettina
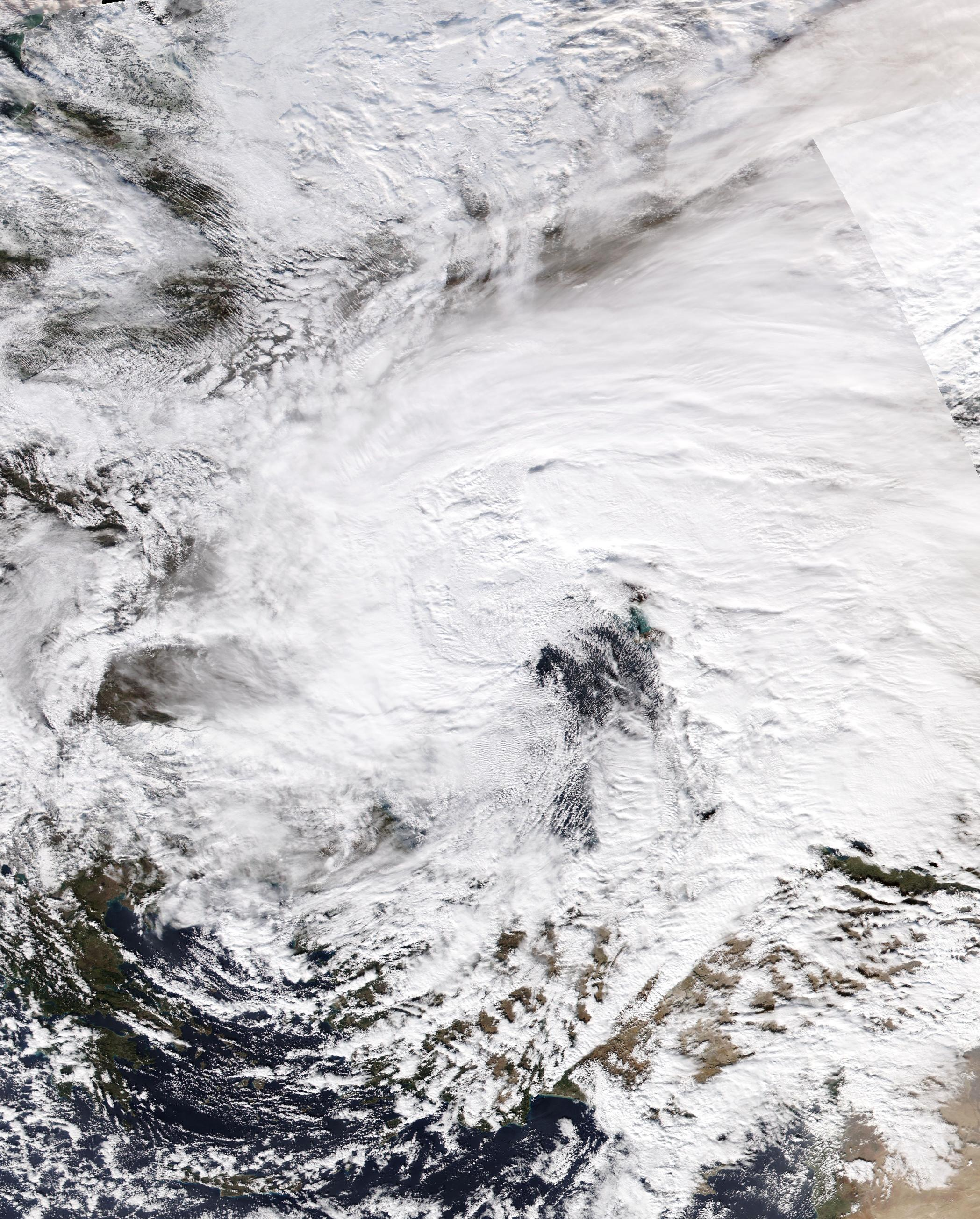
- Area affected: Italy, Turkey, Greece, Ukraine, Moldova, Russia, Romania, Bulgaria, Serbia, Albania, Bosnia and Herzegovina, Kosovo, Montenegro, North Macedonia, Croatia, Crimea, Slovenia, Estonia, Latvia, Lithuania
- Date of impact: 25–28 November 2023
- Lowest pressure: 967 hPa (28.56 inHg)
- Fatalities: 22
- Power outages: >2,500,000
- Damage: Unspecified

Storm Bettina was assigned by the Servizio Meteorologico, the Italian Meteorological Service, as a cold plunge from northern Europe impacted much of the continent. The Free University of Berlin named this system Phil the next day on 26 November 2023.

Up to 60 cm of snow was forecast for Ukraine and Romania, with blizzards possible for parts of southern Europe. Many red and orange snow, rain, wind and ice warnings were in force for many parts of south, central and southeastern parts of Europe. Red wind warnings were also in place for coastal parts of Croatia, with orange and yellow wind warnings in force for parts of the Italian peninsula as well as much of the Balkans, much of Greece, and the island of Sardinia. Turkey was also expected to see impacts from this system with a heavy band of rain with strong winds in association especially in the west and northwest of the country.

Multiple districts and municipalities in Bulgaria declared states of emergency on 26 November 2023 due to heavy snowfalls and strong winds causing severe traffic disruptions and widespread power outages to estimated 800,000 households in Bulgaria. By 27 November 2023, the country's meteorological agency issued a Code Yellow warning for low temperatures to Blagoevgrad, Kyustendil, Pernik and Sofia, while others were still in the Green.

Storm Bettina claimed a total of five lives, while one person was missing. The storm also heavily impacted Crimea as one of the worst storms coming from the Black Sea.

Storm Bettina claimed two lives in İzmir, Turkey. A 62-year-old man died in Konya on 25 November 2023 in his car and was swept away by a flash flood while trying to turn back. On 26 November 2023, a 58-year-old man died in Sinop while working at a construction site when the wall collapsed on him. He was taken to the hospital but could not be saved.

The storm caused heavy snowfall and strong blizzards that lashed Eastern Europe over the weekend, forcing the closure of national roads. This was the first major cold snap that hit and spread across Romania and Moldova, prompting an emergency declaration in Bulgaria. The storm claimed the life of a 40-year-old man in Moldova on 26 November 2023 after his vehicle skidded off the road and crashed into a tree. Two people in Bulgaria died in traffic accidents and 36 were left injured during the stormy weather in the previous 24 hours. At least 10 died and 23 were injured across Ukraine.

Storm Bettina caused power outages to about half a million residents in Crimea, forcing road closures between the villages of Metyevo and Trudovoy in the region of Saki, as well as between the village of Morskoye and the town of Sudak. This caused four people to be injured, and another one was missing after the heavy storm in Crimea.

=== Storm Oliver ===
Storm Oliver
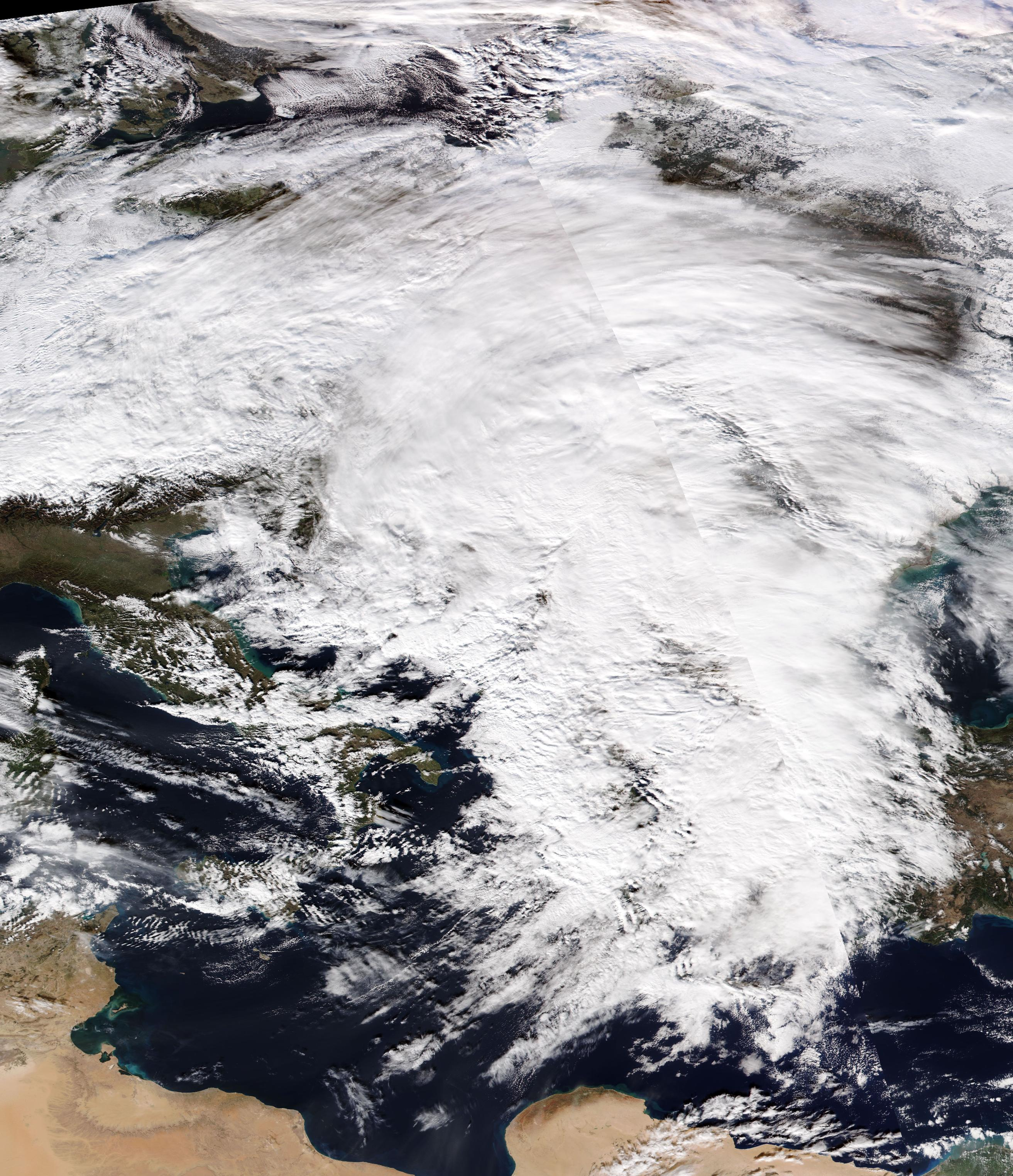
- Area affected: Germany, Czech Republic, Slovakia, Italy, Balkan Peninsula, Poland, Moldova, Ukraine, Baltics
- Date of impact: 28–30 November 2023
- Lowest pressure: 990 hPa (29.23 inHg)
- Fatalities: 1

A new area of low pressure was named Oliver by Free University of Berlin on 28 November 2023 for potential risk for further damage after Storm Bettina a few days prior. The storm was associated with the same cold plunge coming down from northern Europe and the Arctic. There were yellow and orange ice warnings issued for Germany and the Czech Republic, along with many orange wind warnings for parts of northern Italy and the Adriatic Sea coast of Croatia. There was also the threat of heavy flooding rainfall, so there were a plethora of yellow rain warnings in place, especially for Croatia, and orange snow warnings in Romania and Slovakia.

On 28 November 2023, Hellenic National Meteorological Service declared and issued a Level 4 storm warning to the Ionian Islands and western parts of mainland Greece and the Peloponnese, which is just one notch below the highest storm grade for the region.

The storm disrupted rescue efforts and thus claimed the life of one crew member, while authorities managed to save another crew member after Storm Bettina caused a ship to sink. Greek rescuers on 26 November 2023 were still searching for 12 people missing after a ship sank in gale-force winds off the coast of Lesbos.

Storm Oliver on 29 November passed through central Ukraine, bringing more disruptive winds as the storm exited to the north. Oliver dissipated by 30 November.

=== Storm Ciro ===
Storm Ciro
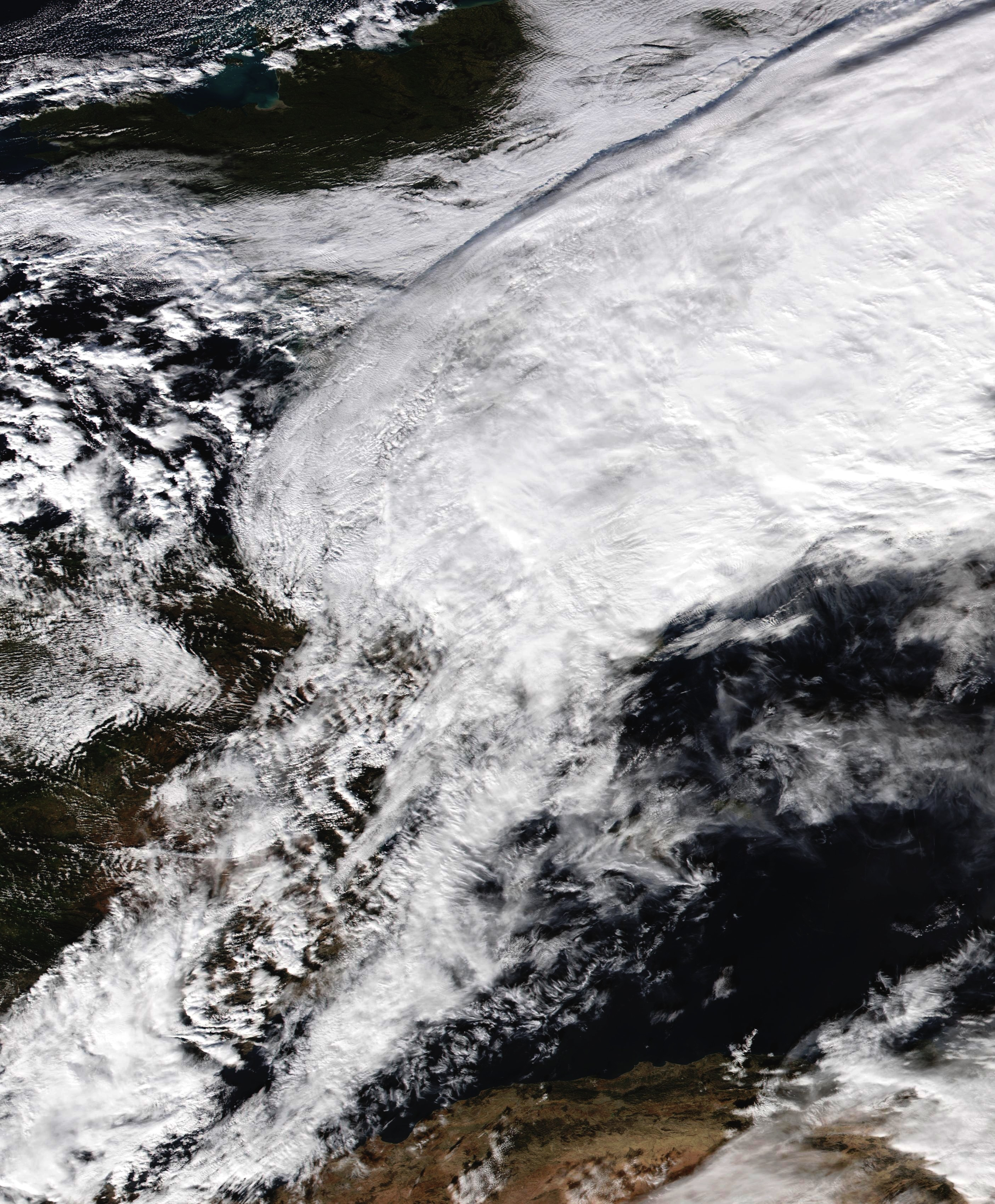
- Area affected: Spain, Portugal, France, Italy, Switzerland, Croatia, Poland, Czech Republic
- Date of impact: 30 November – 3 December 2023
- Lowest pressure: 989 hPa (29.21 inHg)

Storm Ciro was identified and named by Servizio Meteorologico, the Italian Meteorological Service for potential for flooding from heavy rain.

A red rain warning was in force for the regions of Liguria and Tuscany from 01:00 1 December to 18:00 2 December local time. All northern and eastern regions, along with Sicily, were under a red warning as a cold front passed through and disruption was likely.

A broad yellow rain warning was issued for parts of Corsica and southern France from the west coast south of the Garonne, going through to eastern central parts and the regions of Aude, Pyrénées-Orientales and Ariège, with a smaller orange warning for rain and possible avalanches and snow for Savoy and Upper Savoy as well as Hautes-Alpes and the Alpes-de-Haute-Provence.

In Poland and the Czech Republic, red snow and ice warnings were issued in response to the storm projected track and snowfall coverage extent. Meanwhile, a red extreme low temperature warning was issued for central and eastern parts of Italy, including the regions of Molise, Abruzzi and Marches.

=== Storm Elin (Vanja) ===
Storm Elin
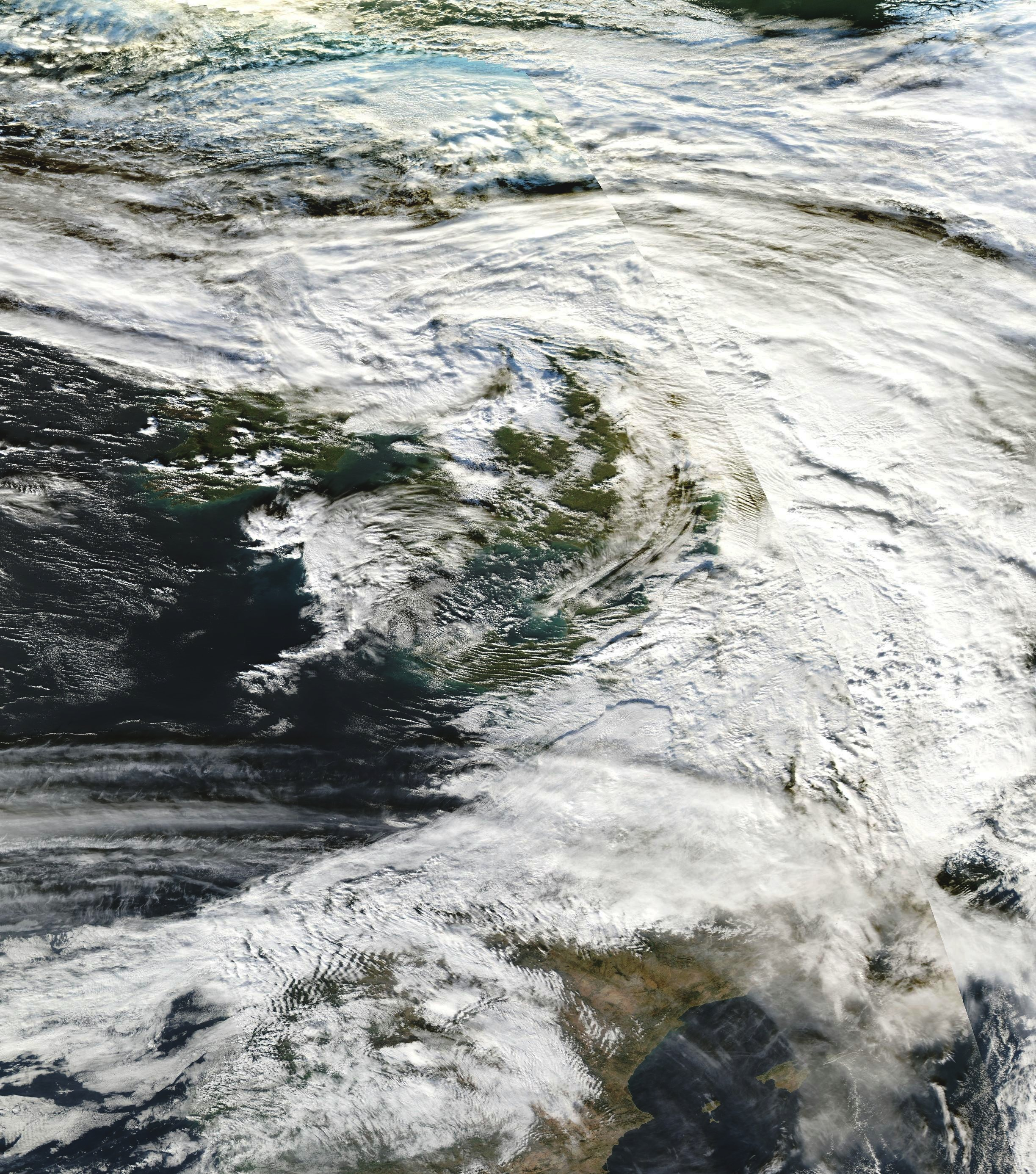
- Area affected: Ireland, United Kingdom
- Date of impact: 9–10 December 2023
- Maximum wind gust: 130 km/h (81mph): Capel Curig, Wales
- Lowest pressure: 976 hPa (28.82 inHg)

Storm Elin was one of the two storms that were named by Met Éireann on 9 December 2023. This first one was named in the early hours on 9 December 2023. The storm was subsequently named Vanja by the Free University of Berlin the next day, 10 December 2023.

The storm hit Ireland, generating gale-force winds and severe gusts which caused travel disruptions during Saturday. Orange wind warnings had already been issued by Met Éireann for Wicklow, Dublin and County Donegal. Yellow wind warnings were also issued for County Clare, County Tipperary, County Cavan and County Monaghan.

Storm Elin then affected the United Kingdom, where the Met Office issued yellow rain warnings for Northern Ireland for County Antrim, County Down, County Tyrone and County Londonderry There was also a broad yellow wind warning covering large parts of Wales and the southwest of England to the coast of East Anglia, where in parts 40–60 mph gusts were expected. Some areas in north Wales were forecast to have winds of 70+ mph.

The Environment Agency had already issued 33 flood warnings for England, indicating potential flash flooding (including for the River Ouse, Yorkshire, with 150 flood alerts in force. As for Ireland, Met Éireann issued orange and yellow rain and wind warnings to 22 counties overnight in order to prepare for the upcoming storm on Sunday.

Damage due to high winds from Storm Elin was reported in Sheffield. A lone sycamore tree, described as "iconic" by locals, was felled in Graves Park. Two other trees were felled elsewhere in the park, one of which damaged a childrens' play area and the other crushed a greenhouse and destroyed a 200-year-old stone wall.

=== Storm Fergus (Walter) ===
Storm Fergus
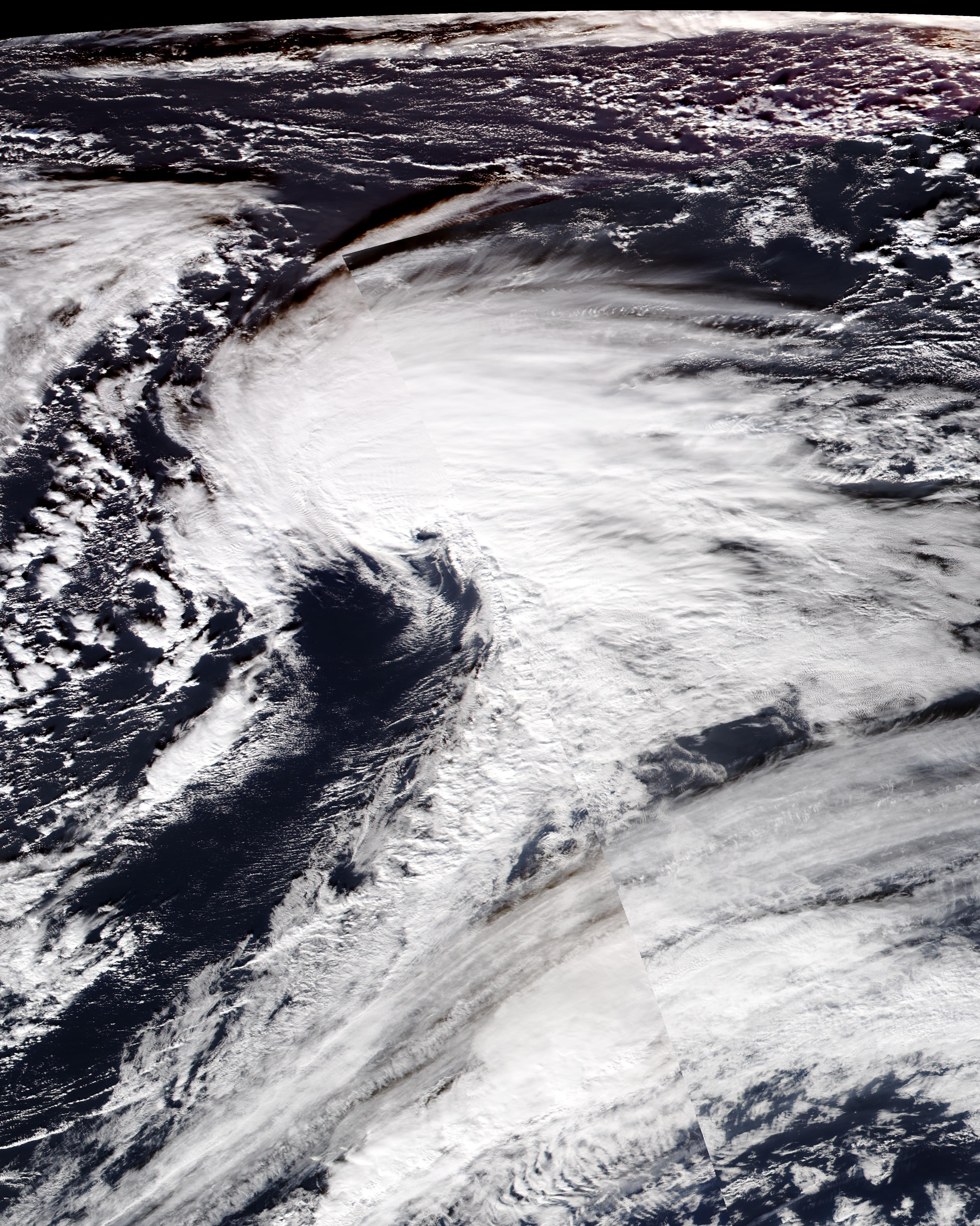
- Area affected: Ireland, United Kingdom
- Date of impact: 9–11 December 2023
- Maximum wind gust: 124 km/h (77 mph): Leeds, United Kingdom: 10 December 2023
- Lowest pressure: 965 hPa (28.50 inHg)

Storm Fergus was the second storm of the two that were named by Met Éireann on 9 December 2023. This storm was named in the late morning on 9 December 2023 and named by the Free University of Berlin as Walter that same day.

This storm affected Ireland and United Kingdom, with very strong offshore winds coupled with high waves and tides during Sunday for Ireland. Met Éireann also predicted localized coastal flooding and wave overtopping as potential impacts by the storm.

Meanwhile, in preparation for Storm Fergus to make landfall, yellow wind warnings were issued for County Cavan, Dublin, County Kildare, County Longford, County Louth, County Meath, County Offaly, County Westmeath, County Leitrim, County Roscommon and County Sligo. On top of the yellow warnings, orange wind warnings were already issued for County Clare, County Galway and County Mayo

=== Storm Pia (Zoltan) ===
Storm Pia
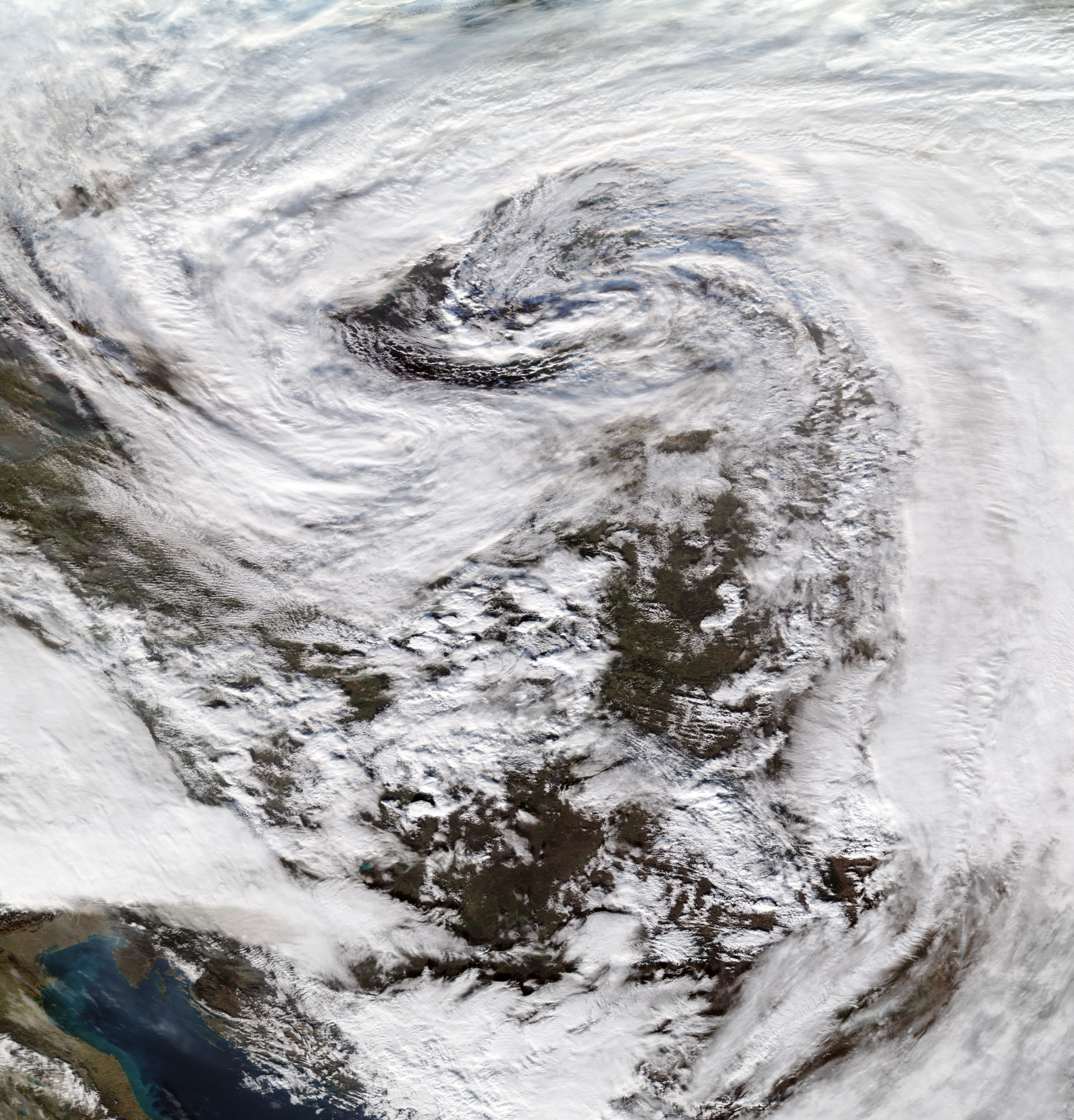
- Area affected: Scandinavia, United Kingdom, the Netherlands, Belgium, Germany & Austria
- Date of impact: 20–22 December 2023
- Maximum wind gust: 185 km/h (115 mph) – Cairn Gorm summit, Scotland
- Lowest pressure: 958 hPa (28.29 inHg)
- Fatalities: 6 (1 missing)

Storm Pia was named by the Danish Meteorological Institute, a part of the Northern Group, on 20 December 2023. The Free University of Berlin named this system Zoltan.

The storm impacted the United Kingdom, southern Scandinavia, the Netherlands, Belgium and northern Germany, causing major disruptions in holiday travel, with many cancelled ferries, trains and flights, closed bridges and roads that had to be cleared from fallen trees and turned over lorries, as well as thousands of homes losing power due to downed power lines and a storm surge that reached up to 3 m (9.8 ft) above the normal high tide mark.

In Denmark, an 81-year-old man was killed when a car driving in the opposite direction swerved to avoid a fallen tree, resulting in a frontal collision. In Belgium, a 63-year-old woman died when a 20 m (66 ft) Christmas tree fell on her at a market in Oudenaarde. In the Netherlands, a 39-year-old care worker died after being struck by a tree while riding a tandem bicycle. In Germany, a 62-year-old man was killed by a falling fence. In Austria, an 81-year-old man was killed by a falling tree.

Strong rainfall in combination with the storm led to widespread flooding in parts of Germany. A sailing accident on the Elbe River in Saxony was believed to have been caused by gusty winds and high water Levels. One person remained missing. A 64-year-old man was found dead in Thuringia after he fell into the River Werra while working at a flood regulation gate.

=== Storm Gerrit (Bodo) ===
Storm Gerrit
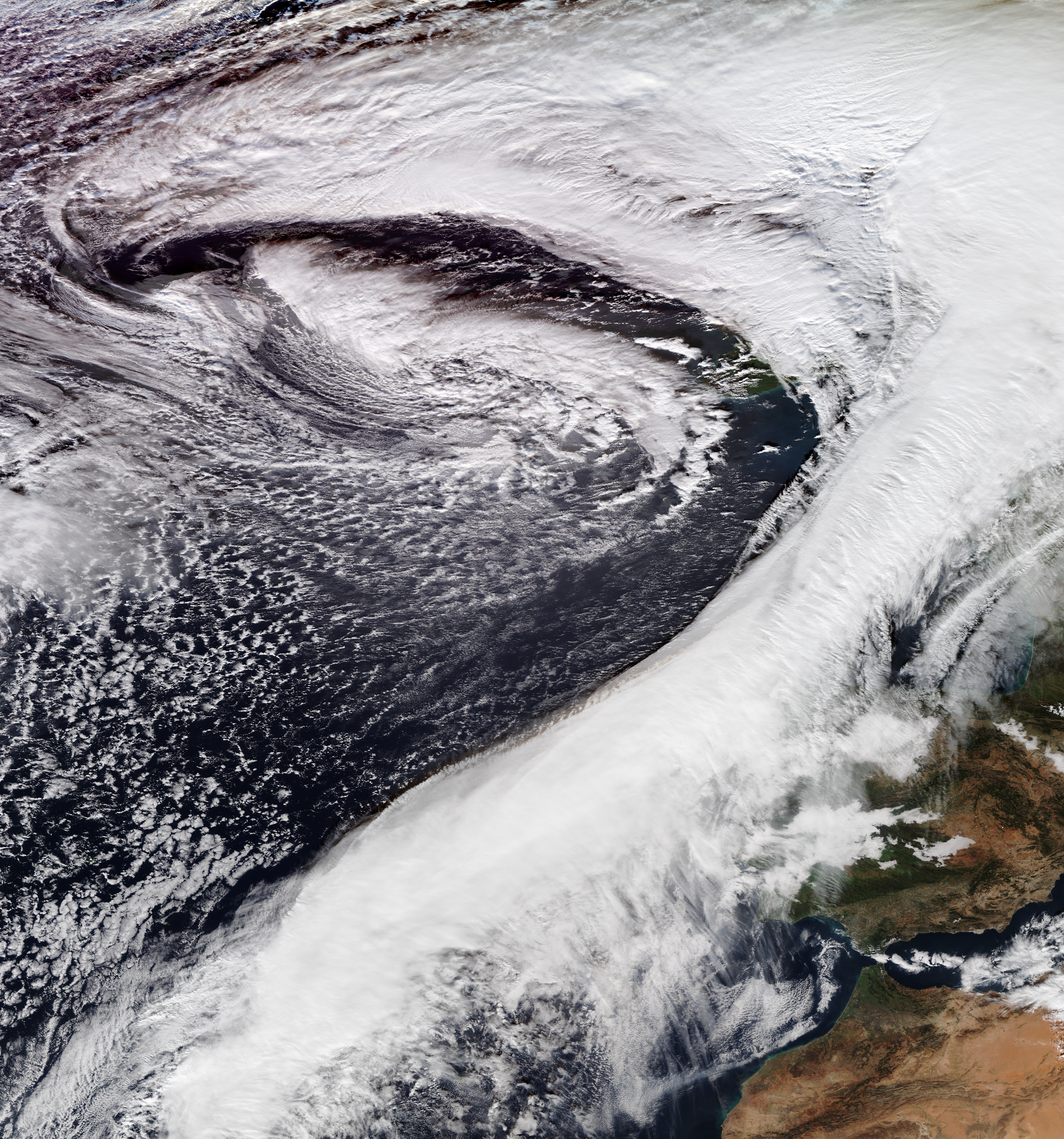
- Area affected: Ireland, United Kingdom, Norway, France
- Date of impact: 26–30 December 2023
- Maximum wind gust: 143 km/h (89 mph) – Fair Isle, Scotland
- Lowest pressure: 968 hPa (28.59 inHg)
- Fatalities: 3

Storm Gerrit was named by the Met Office on 26 December 2023. The storm system was also named as Bodo by the Free University of Berlin. The storm's wind, rain and snow had a severe impact on the British Isles and Norway.

The storm's impact on travel was only increased by the fact that it had occurred over Boxing Day, a day when road travel was expected to be heavier than usual. On 26 December there were many yellow weather warnings in force, with a yellow wind warning for the south coast of England extending from Cornwall to Essex. Nearly all of Wales and Scotland were placed under a yellow weather warning, as well as large areas of northwest and north-central England.

A rain warning for much of Wales and the northwest of England was also announced, as well as a rain and wind warning for Northern Ireland. A rain and snow warning was also in effect for parts of western and central Scotland, where heavy snowing caused blizzard conditions. Wind strengths were as high as 60–70 mph (97–113 km/h) for some parts, mainly around the southern and western coasts.

For the Republic of Ireland, orange wind warnings were put up on the 27 December for the following counties: Clare, Cork, Kerry and Galway, with a broad yellow wind warning covering the rest of the country.

In some areas, widespread disruptions to bus and rail services occurred, with many ScotRail services experiencing delays from restrictions and extreme weather like flooding and downed trees. The highest wind velocity officially recorded by the Met Office was a gust of 89 mph (143 km/h) in Fair Isle, Scotland. Also recorded were gusts of 86 mph (138 km/h) in Kincardineshire in eastern Scotland, and 69 mph (111 km/h) at the Isle of Wight and Stornoway in Scotland.

A major incident was declared in Greater Manchester, when a tornado touched down in Stalybridge shortly before midnight on 27 December. Homes sustained significant roof damage, and groves of trees were snapped, debranched and stubbed. Following a site investigation, TORRO found that the tornado had travelled 6.7 km, reaching a maximum width of up to 1 km. ESSL rated the tornado an IF2 on the International Fujita scale. As a result of the storm, three fatalities were recorded when a 4x4 plunged into the River Esk on the North York Moors National Park due to the hazardous driving conditions.

On 29 December, Gerrit continued to cause impacts with strong winds and wintery showers for Shetland with ferry delays of at least two hours, and some ferry cancellations.

The storm was named after Dutch meteorologist Gerrit Hiemstra by the Royal Netherlands Meteorological Institute, after retiring from the Dutch public news broadcaster NOS Journaal, where Hiemstra worked from 1998 until 2023.

=== Storm Geraldine (Costa) ===
Storm Geraldine
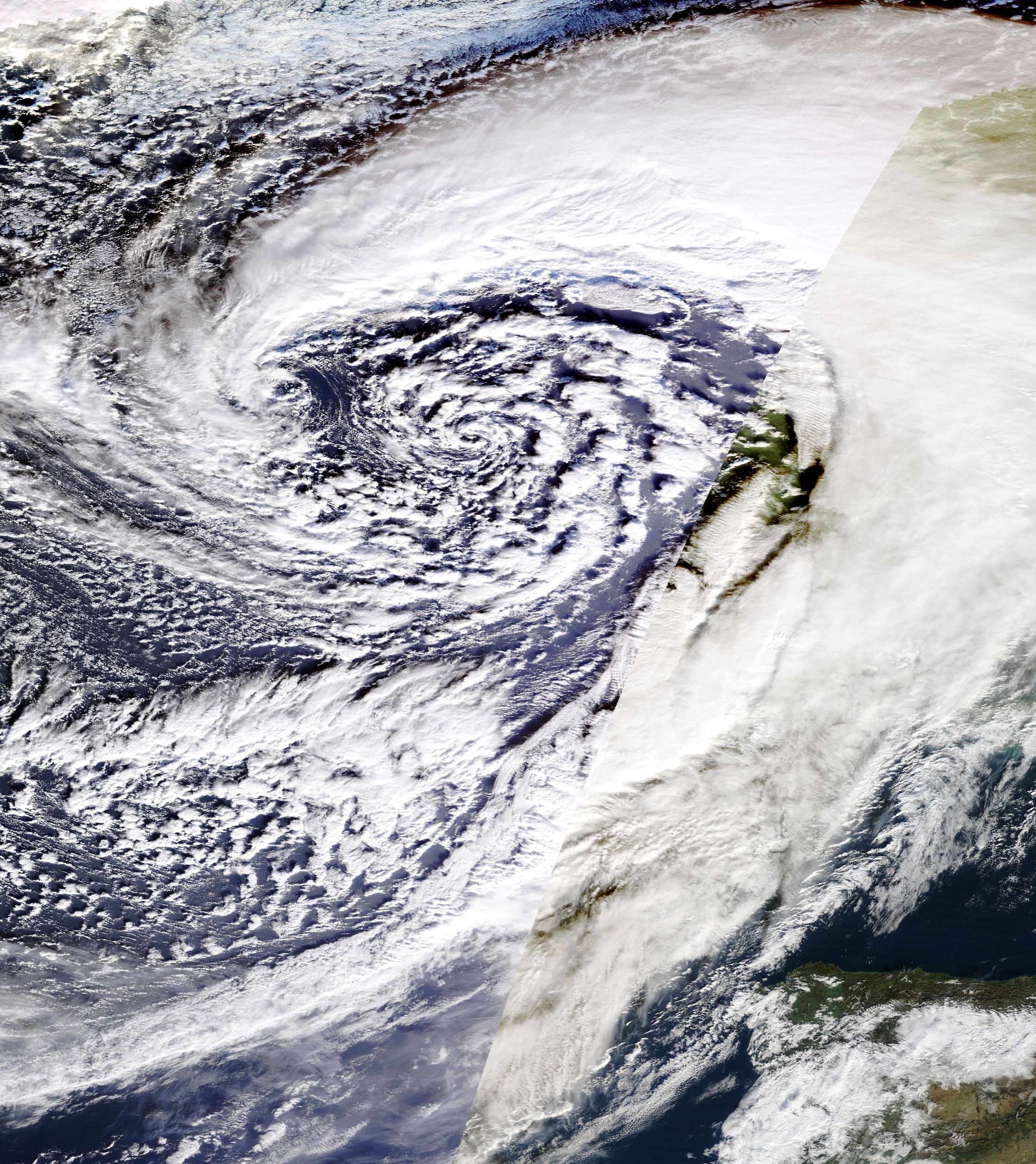
- Area affected: Ireland, United Kingdom, France
- Date of impact: 30 December 2023 – 1 January 2024
- Lowest pressure: 966 hPa (28.53 inHg)

Storm Geraldine was named by Météo-France on 30 December 2023, and was later named Costa by the Free University of Berlin.

Yellow wind warnings were in force for much of Ireland, especially the south coast on 30 December, as well as the United Kingdom. On 31 December, a yellow rain warning was active in the northwest of England with a large yellow wind warning along the south coast of Wales and England. There was also a yellow wind warning in force for the following counties in southwestern parts of Ireland: Clare, Cork, Kerry, and Limerick.

In France a large yellow wind warning covered much of the north of the country, with an orange wind and rain warnings up for Pas-de-Calais.

The storm system dissipated shortly after in the North Sea on 1 January 2024.

=== Storm Henk (Annelie) ===
Storm Henk
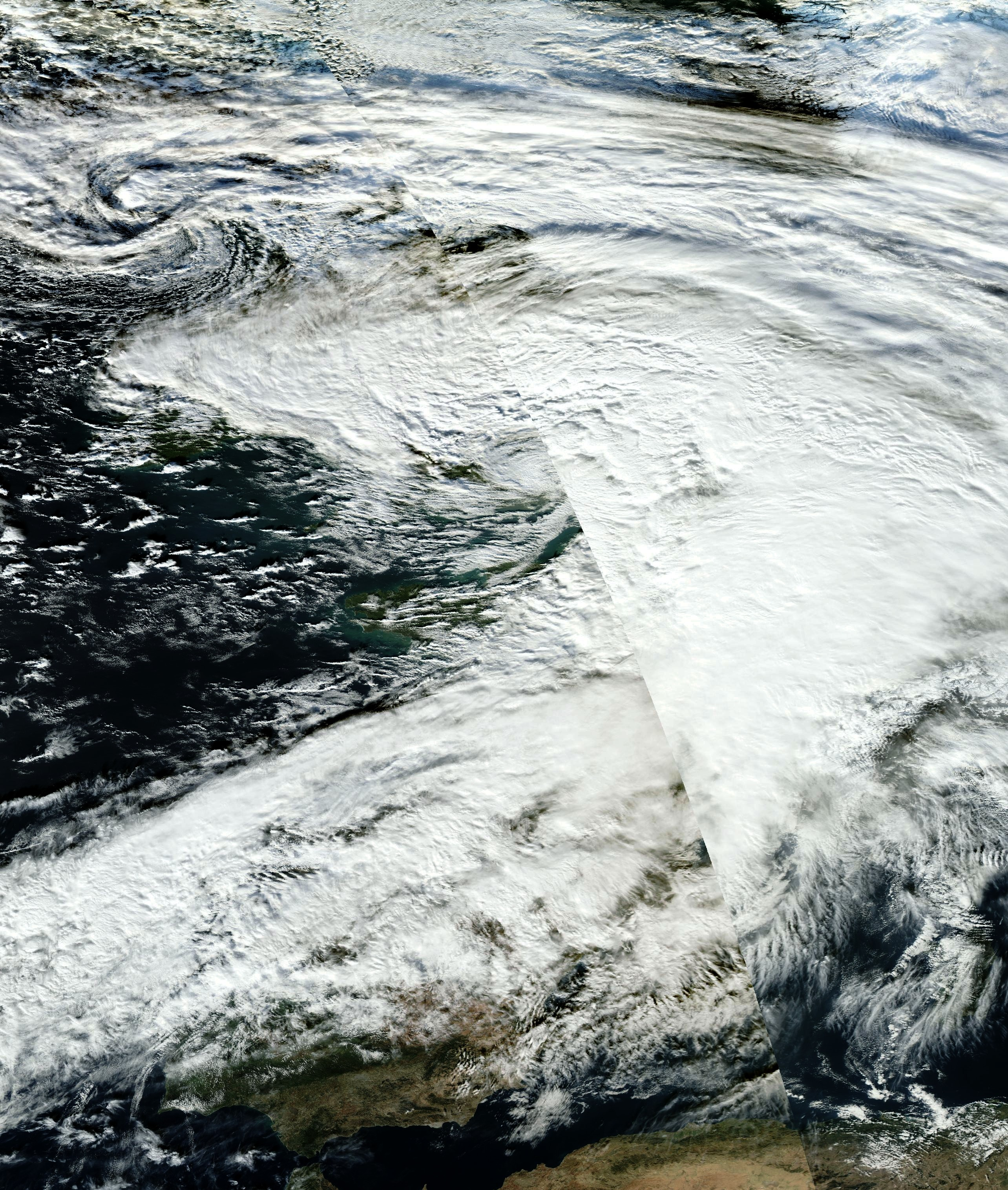
- Area affected: United Kingdom, Netherlands, France, Denmark, Germany, Sweden, Poland, The Baltics
- Date of impact: 2–5 January 2024
- Maximum wind gust: 94 mph (151 km/h) – The Needles, Isle of Wight
- Lowest pressure: 970 hPa (28.64 inHg)
- Fatalities: 2
- Power outages: 38,000

Storm Henk was named by the Met Office on 2 January 2024, and subsequently named Annelie by the FUB in Germany the same day, due to the threat of very strong winds and heavy rain.

An amber wind warning was issued for southern and central regions of England and southern Wales on 2 January, spanning from the Scilly Isles, through south-western and southern England, the South Midlands, and through to East Anglia. This warning was issued due to an anticipated swathe of strong winds, gusting between 60 and 80 mph (97 and 129 km/h) in these areas on that day. Additionally, there was a broader yellow warning surrounding the amber one, indicating a wider area of concern for potentially impactful winds. The Environment Agency issued 27 flood warnings for Oxfordshire on 5 January after the River Cherwell burst its banks.

As a result of Storm Henk, extensive flooding affected South West England. Tewkesbury in Gloucestershire was particularly affected. In Worcester, the city centre was flooded. The Cooper Dean roundabout near the Royal Bournemouth Hospital was flooded. In Devon, several major roads were flooded including a landslip on the A377 in Crediton. In Shropshire, Shrewsbury was again hit by floods, as River Severn levels were expected to reach 15.4 feet (4.7 m). Over 600 flood warnings were in place across Southern England. Flood alerts were also in place in Wales affecting Wrexham and Flintshire.

Exeter Airport reported a wind gust of 81 mph (130 km/h), with The Needles on Isle of Wight recording a 94 mph (151 km/h) gust. In Ipswich, despite the amber wind warning, the Orwell Bridge remained open.

A woman was taken to hospital after being hit by a tree during the storm in Orpington. The incident happened just before 3.15 pm. Police, London Ambulance Service and London Fire Brigade attended and found a woman injured. She was taken to hospital for treatment where her injuries were assessed as not life-threatening.

On the A433, about eight miles (13 km) north of Malmesbury, another person died after a falling tree crushed their car during the storm. Emergency services were called at around 3.15 pm. Two cars were struck by a huge tree after it was uprooted by strong winds and fell into the road. One vehicle was completely crushed, whilst another sustained less significant damage. An occupant of one of the cars was pronounced dead at the scene. On the B4526 near Crays Pond, Oxfordshire, an 87-year-old woman died when the car she was driving hit a fallen tree at around 5.25 pm.

The London Eye was briefly closed for safety checks after a roof hatch in one of the pods was blown open by high winds while passengers were aboard. London Eye described the incident as an "isolated technical issue". The Wilfred barge sank off Victoria Embankment in the River Thames.

In The Netherlands, strong winds may have contributed to a tragic incident where a 75-year-old man fell off his bicycle and drowned. The storm also led to the collapse of a dyke, affecting water levels in the Maas River.

=== Storm Brigitta ===
Storm Brigitta
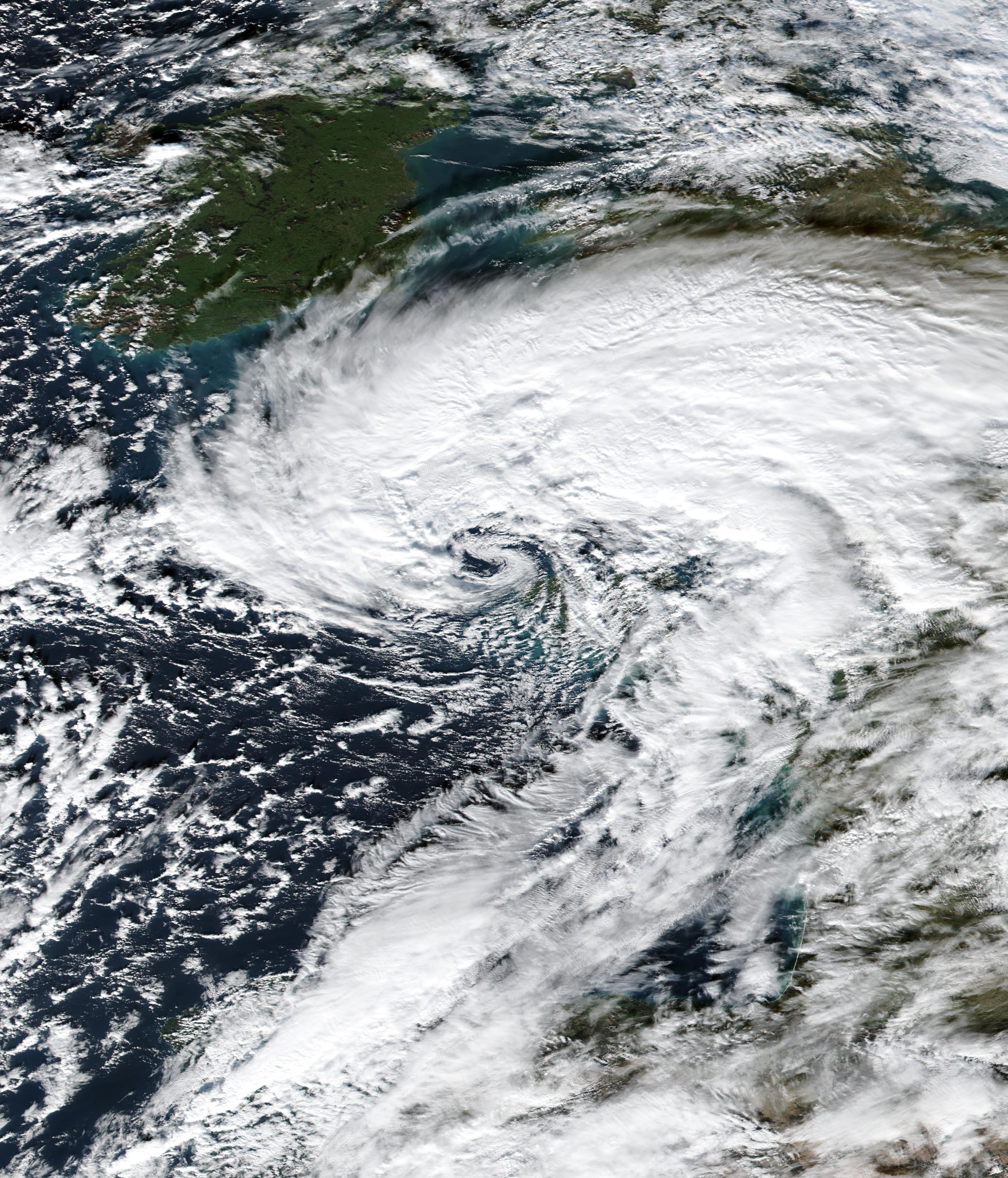
- Area affected: Germany, United Kingdom, France, Belgium, Netherlands
- Date of impact: 3–6 January 2024
- Lowest pressure: 987 hPa (29.15 inHg)

Storm Brigitta was a small but damaging storm that was named by the Free University of Berlin (FUB) on 3 January 2024. The storm system prompted a yellow rain warning for the south and east of the United Kingdom. Heavy rainfall was anticipated to cause major flooding disruption in the wake of Storm Henk, which moved through two days earlier. Major incidents were declared across the UK, with widespread flooding causing travel chaos.

In France a red flood warning was issued for Pas-de-Calais and an orange flood warning for the Ardennes, including Lille. There was also a broad yellow wind and flood warning for the north half of the country.

In Germany a level 3 red warning for rain was issued for western parts of the country, with a level 2 orange warning for rain encompassing the red warning.

=== Storm Hipolito ===
Storm Hipolito
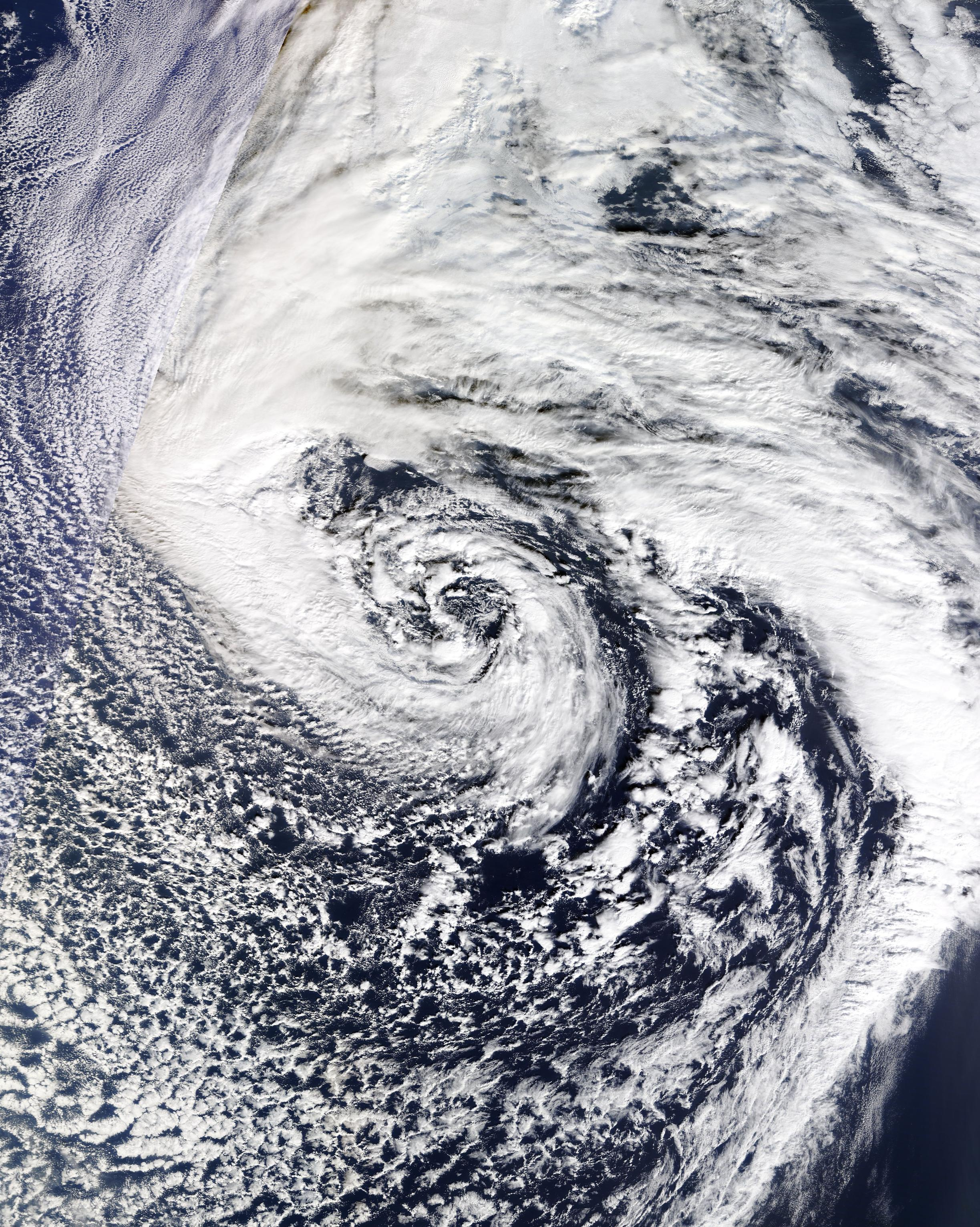
- Area affected: Azores
- Date of impact: 8–14 January 2024
- Lowest pressure: 974 hPa (28.76 inHg)

Hipolito was named by the Portuguese Institute of the Sea and the Atmosphere (IPMA) on 8 January 2024.

The system brought strong winds and heavy rain to the Azores. An orange wind and rain warning was in force for the central group of islands. Regional Civil Protection and Fire Service of the Azores (SRPCBA) said that there were a total of 53 occurrences on six islands, namely São Miguel, Terceira, Graciosa, São Jorge, Pico and Faial.

The latest reported situations were related to flooding of roads, flooding of homes, falling trees, falling structures and damage to structures.

=== Storm Irene (Gertrud) ===
Storm Irene
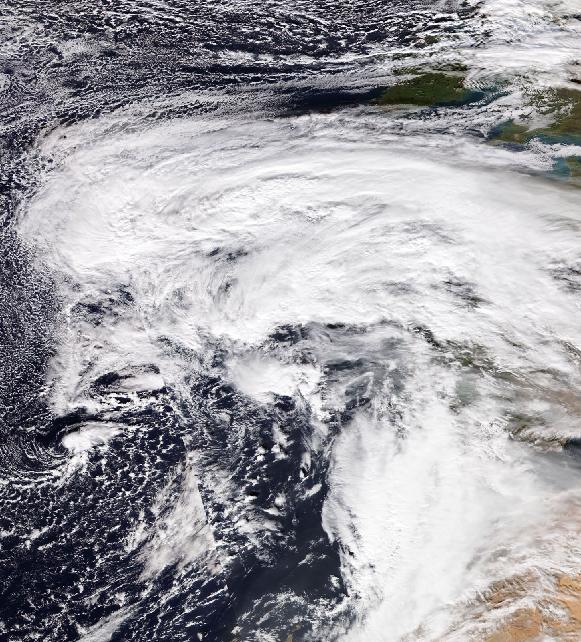
- Area affected: France, Spain, Canary Islands, Portugal, Azores, Germany, Poland, Switzerland
- Date of impact: 14–18 January 2024
- Lowest pressure: 981 hPa (28.97 inHg)

Storm Irene was named by Meteo France on 14 January 2024 and Gertrud the same day by FUB. Storm Irene's effects were expected to be felt from 15 to 16 January in the Canary Islands, and on 16–17 January for the Iberian Peninsula and parts of France; more intensity was expected for the western part, with gusts of strong or very strong wind and persistent rain.

A yellow wind and rain warning was issued for parts of the Azores and the Madeira Islands on 16 January. The entire country of Portugal was also under the same yellow wind and rain warning for an additional day. Additionally, there was an orange wind, rain, and coastal event warning in effect for the southern parts of Madeira.

On 17 January, in northern France, a broad orange snow and ice warning was in force with yellow wind and rain warnings elsewhere. Yellow Avalanche warnings were also up for the Alps regions of eastern France. Furthermore, there was an orange wind warning for specific regions in northern Spain, and a broad yellow wind and rain warning over most of the country.

In Germany, Deutscher Wetterdienst issued Level 3 snow and ice warnings for all of south of the country, with level 1 and 2 further north. There was also a Level 4 snow and ice warning in western parts, including Frankfurt; significant disruption was anticipated.

=== Storm Juan ===
Storm Juan
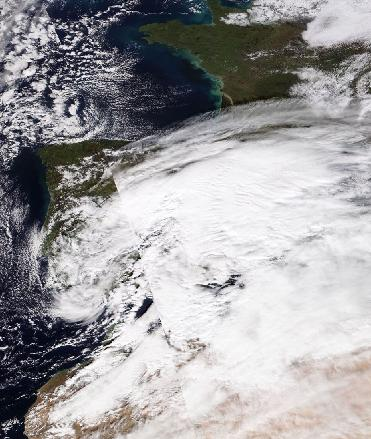
- Area affected: Spain, Portugal
- Date of impact: 18–20 January 2024
- Lowest pressure: 1,001 hPa (29.56 inHg)

Storm Juan was named by Spanish Met Service (AEMET), on 18 January 2024.

Heavy rainfall and snowfall were expected, with an orange snow warningissued for central regions in Spain. Many yellow rain warnings were in force for the southern and central parts of the country. In Portugal a yellow rain warning was issued for much of the south of the country, including the Lisbon area.

=== Storm Isha (Iris) ===
Storm Isha
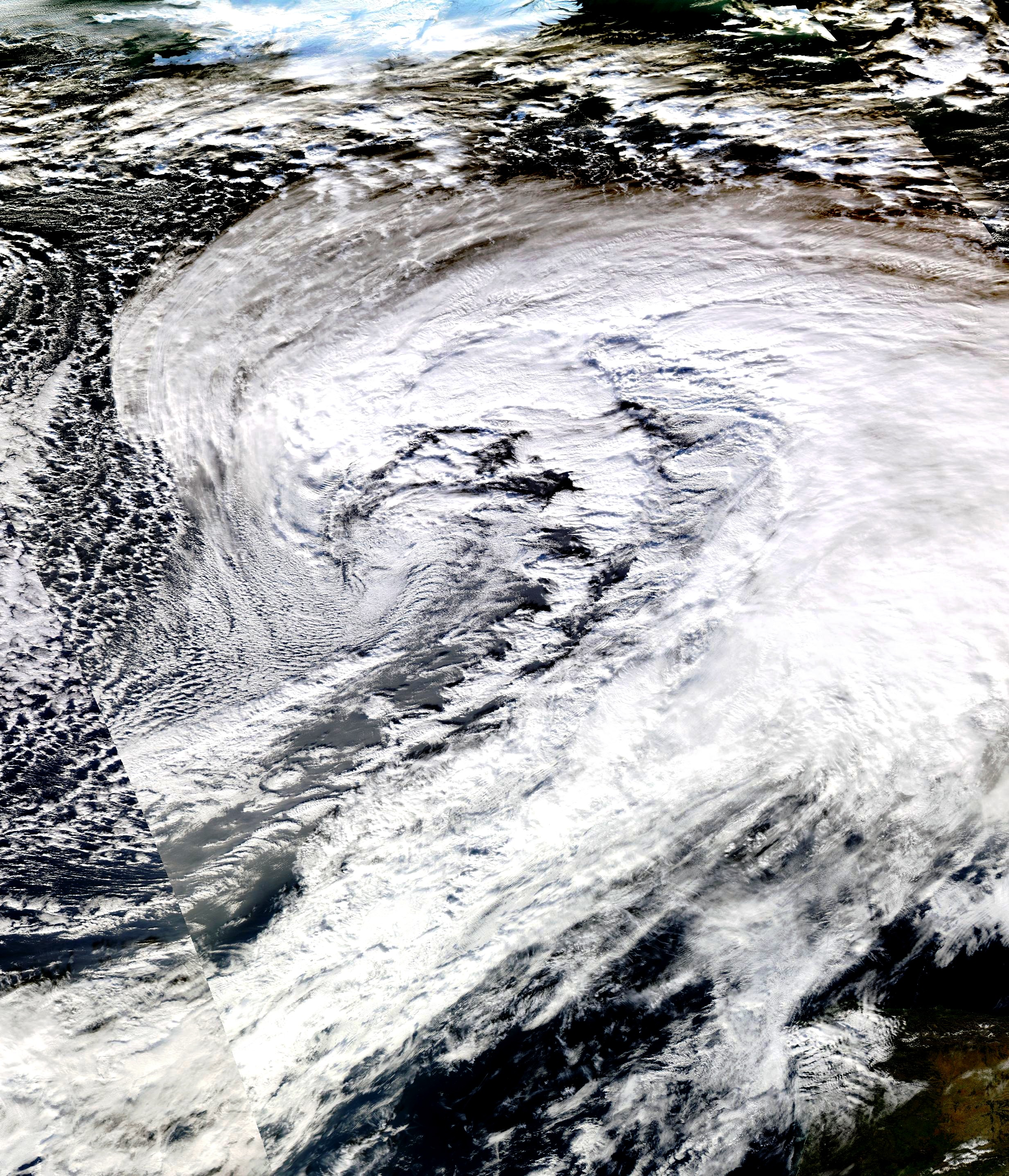
- Area affected: United Kingdom, Ireland, Netherlands, Norway, Denmark, Sweden
- Date of impact: 19–23 January 2024
- Maximum wind gust: 199 km/h (124 mph):The Cairnwell, Aberdeenshire
- Lowest pressure: 956 hPa (28.23 inHg)
- Fatalities: 4
- Power outages: 618,000

Storm Isha was named by the Met Office on 19 January due to the threat of very strong winds, while the Free University of Berlin named the same system as Iris the following day, 20 January.

An orange warning was given out in the Netherlands. IJmuiden recorded a wind gust of 110 km/h (70 mph).

In the United Kingdom, two 12-hour amber weather warnings for wind were in place from 6 p.m. on 21 January, which covered the whole country excluding the East of England, London and the Shetland Islands. A 24-hour yellow weather warning for wind which covered the entire country was also in place from midday on 21 January. At around 11:30 p.m. on 21 January, the Met Office issued a 4-hour red weather warning for wind from 1 a.m. for northeast Scotland covering Thurso, Wick, Elgin, Banff, Fraserburgh and Peterhead. In Ireland, Met Éireann issued a Status Red wind warning for Galway, Mayo and Donegal, while Status Yellow and Status Orange warnings were also issued for the rest of the country. In the Netherlands, a yellow wind warning covered the entire country from midnight on 21 January until 9 a.m. the following day.

A number of flights were cancelled, while a tornado watch was issued for Ireland, the majority of Scotland, and parts of England by TORRO. A brief red wind warning was in force in Scotland as Isha passed through overnight.

At Capel Curig, Snowdonia, a wind gust of 90 mph (140 km/h) was recorded on Sunday afternoon. During the early hours of 22 January, a gust of 99 mph (159 km/h) was recorded at RRH Brizlee Wood in Northumberland. Train services such as Great Western Railway were delayed until the storm passes. The A14 Orwell Bridge in Ipswich was closed due to the strength of the winds. ScotRail cancelled all services from 7 p.m. on 21 January until after the following day's rush hour due to the high winds.

The storm caused thousands of power outages across the British Isles, with 235,000 properties in Ireland, 53,000 homes in Northern Ireland and around 330,000 in England, Scotland and Wales.

The Met Office listed maximum gust speeds for Storm Isha; the highest shown was 108 Kt (124 mph) recorded at The Cairnwell, Aberdeenshire, and a minimum central pressure of 947 hPa (27.96 inHg) from Storm Isha. According to some news articles, and a Twitter post by Glencoe Mountain Resort, a wind speed of 168 mph was recorded in Glencoe, Scotland, but this windspeed was not verified by the Met Office, which means the highest verified wind-speed was 108 Kt (124 mph) at The Cairnwell, Aberdeenshire, Scotland.

A total of four people were killed during the storm: a woman died at 1:50 on 22 January in Carnalogue, County Louth, when a van collided with a tree; a man died at 18:15 on 21 January when he drove into a flood on the N17 in Lisduff, County Mayo; an 84-year-old man died at about 23:45 on 21 January after the car he was travelling in hit a fallen tree on Beancross Road in Grangemouth; and a man in his 60s was killed at 21:45 on 21 January after his van was involved in a crash with a fallen tree and another vehicle on Broad Road in Limavady, County Londonderry.

In Sweden weather warnings were issued for snowfall in combination with high winds across parts of Sweden on Monday, with cancelled trains and accidents on icy roads causing disruption to traffic.

=== Storm Jocelyn (Jitka) ===
Storm Jocelyn
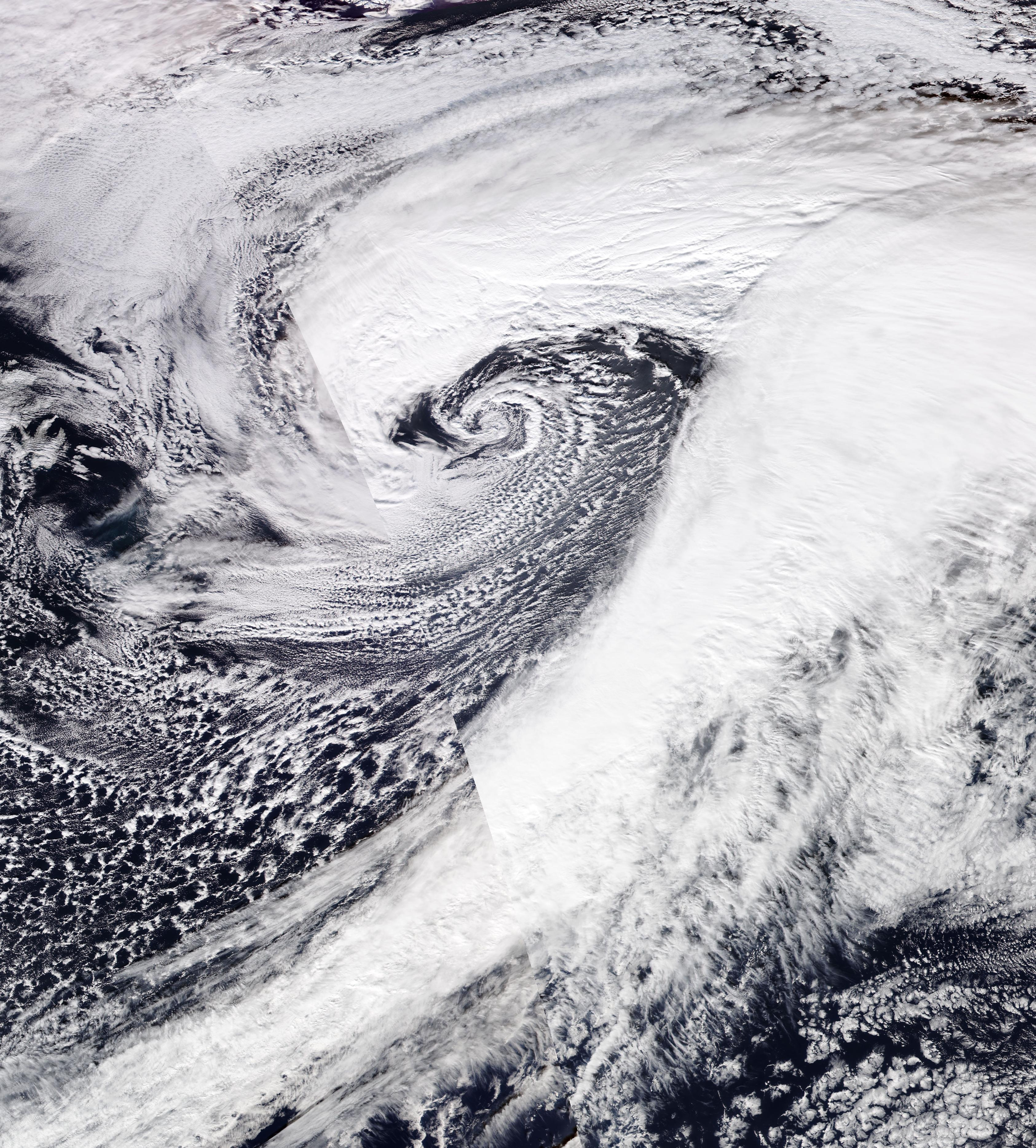
- Area affected: United Kingdom, Ireland, Denmark, Norway, Sweden, Germany, Poland, Estonia, Latvia, Lithuania
- Date of impact: 22–26 January 2024
- Maximum wind gust: 225 km/h (140 mph): Cairn Gorm, Scotland
- Lowest pressure: 947 hPa (27.96 inHg)
- Fatalities: 1
- Power outages: 100,000

Storm Jocelyn was named by the Met Éireann and Jitka by FUB on 22 January due to the threat of very strong winds.

Orange and Yellow wind warnings were issued for a lot of Ireland, and Yellow warnings of wind and rain were issued by the Met Office for Scotland and Northern England. A small Amber warning was also in force for the western and northern coastal area of Scotland.

In Germany Level 2 orange warnings were issued for wind. Poland issued Degree 1 warnings for wind and degree 2 on the coast, which indicated winds of 91–110 km/h (~55-70 mph). Denmark issued warnings for increased water level for the Wadden Sea, central West Coast, in the western part of the Limfjord, western Kattegat, Århus Bay, northern Little Belt, North and East Funen and the coast of North Zealand and Øresund. DMI Warnings for gales and gusts of storm force were raised along the west coast of Jutland. Sweden also had warnings for wind and increased water levels. Estonia, Latvia and Lithuania also had yellow wind warnings. A gust of 140 mph was recorded at Cairngorm in Scotland.

One fatality was reported from the storm, as a 73-year-old man from the Isle of Lewis had fatal injuries from a car crash. This happened near Balallan around 11.40am on 23 January.

According to the Met Office, there was a top gust of 140 mph at Cairngorm Summit and a minimum central pressure of 961 hPa (28.38 inHg) from Storm Jocelyn.

=== Storm Avgi ===
Storm Avgi
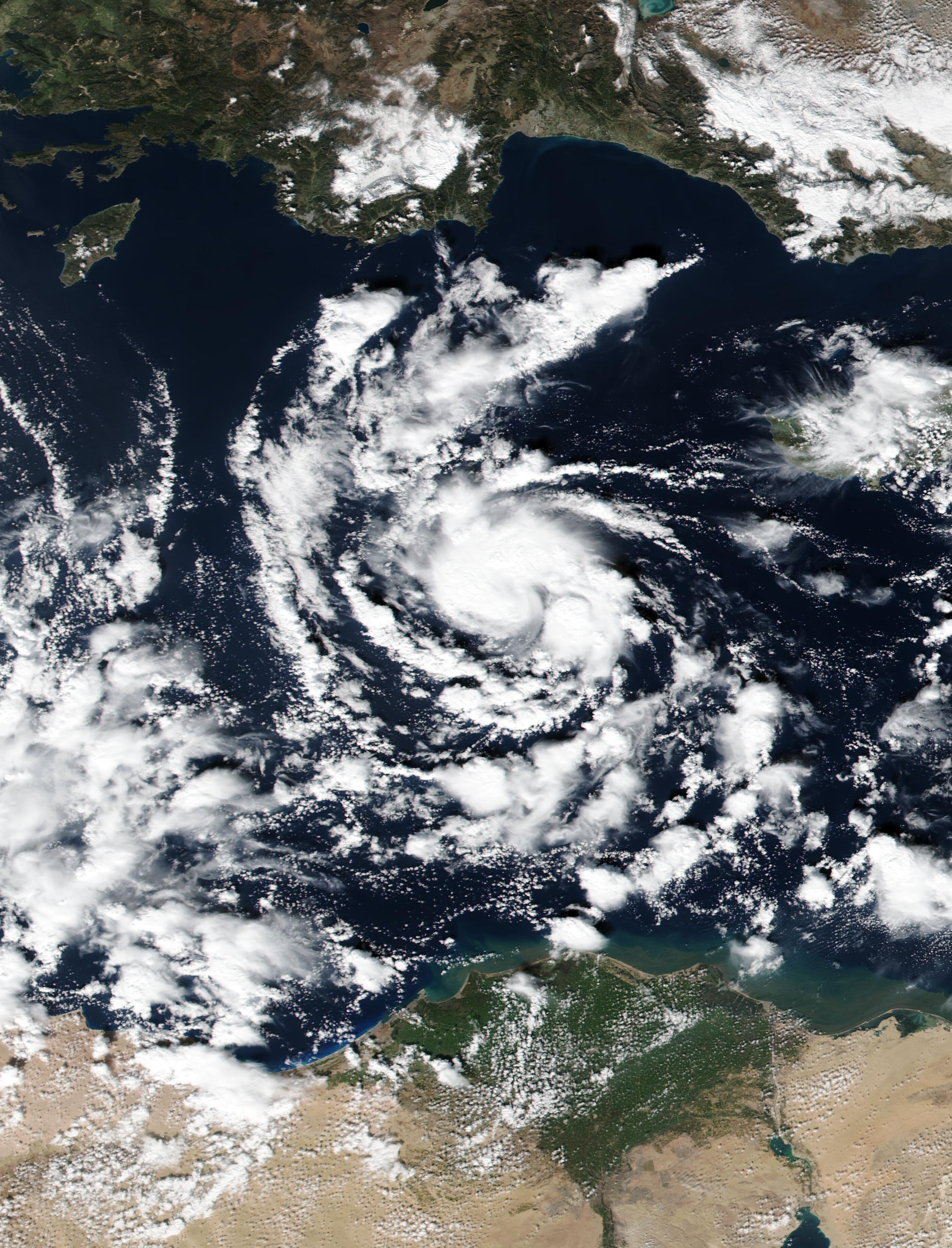
- Area affected: Greece, Israel, Cyprus, Egypt
- Date of impact: 28 January — 2 February 2024
- Lowest pressure: 1,011 hPa (29.85 inHg)

Storm Avgi was named by the Hellenic National Meteorological Service on 28 January for the risk of heavy rain associated with a cold spell. As the storm meandered near Cyprus, it slowly begun to shed its frontal features, eventually transitioning into a subtropical cyclone on 31 January through the support of a zonal trough aloft and an extensive blocking pattern. Avgi began to track towards the southeast as the cloud pattern improved, accelerating towards Levant, where it made landfall on 2 February.

Heavy snowfall and significant temperature drops were expected to last until 31 January, according to the National Meteorological Service. Snowfall was forecast from Thessaly, central Greece, southward, even in lower-altitude areas. High pressures in the northwestern Balkans, coupled with low pressures in the eastern Mediterranean, caused stormy winds and further temperature drops, along with locally heavy rainfall in southern areas. Furthermore, on 30 January, northerly winds in the Aegean Sea reached speeds of 9 Beaufort, locally reaching 10 Beaufort, accompanied by heavy rain and thunderstorms, which was expected to gradually subside from Wednesday evening onwards, according to the Hellenic National Meteorological Service.

In Israel, heavy rain prompted the issuance of yellow rain, wind and thunderstorm warnings for northern parts of the country. Meanwhile, orange rain warnings existed for Greece, and an orange thunderstorm warning for Cyprus, including a yellow rain warning for northern Egypt.

=== Storm Ingunn (Margrit) ===
Storm Ingunn
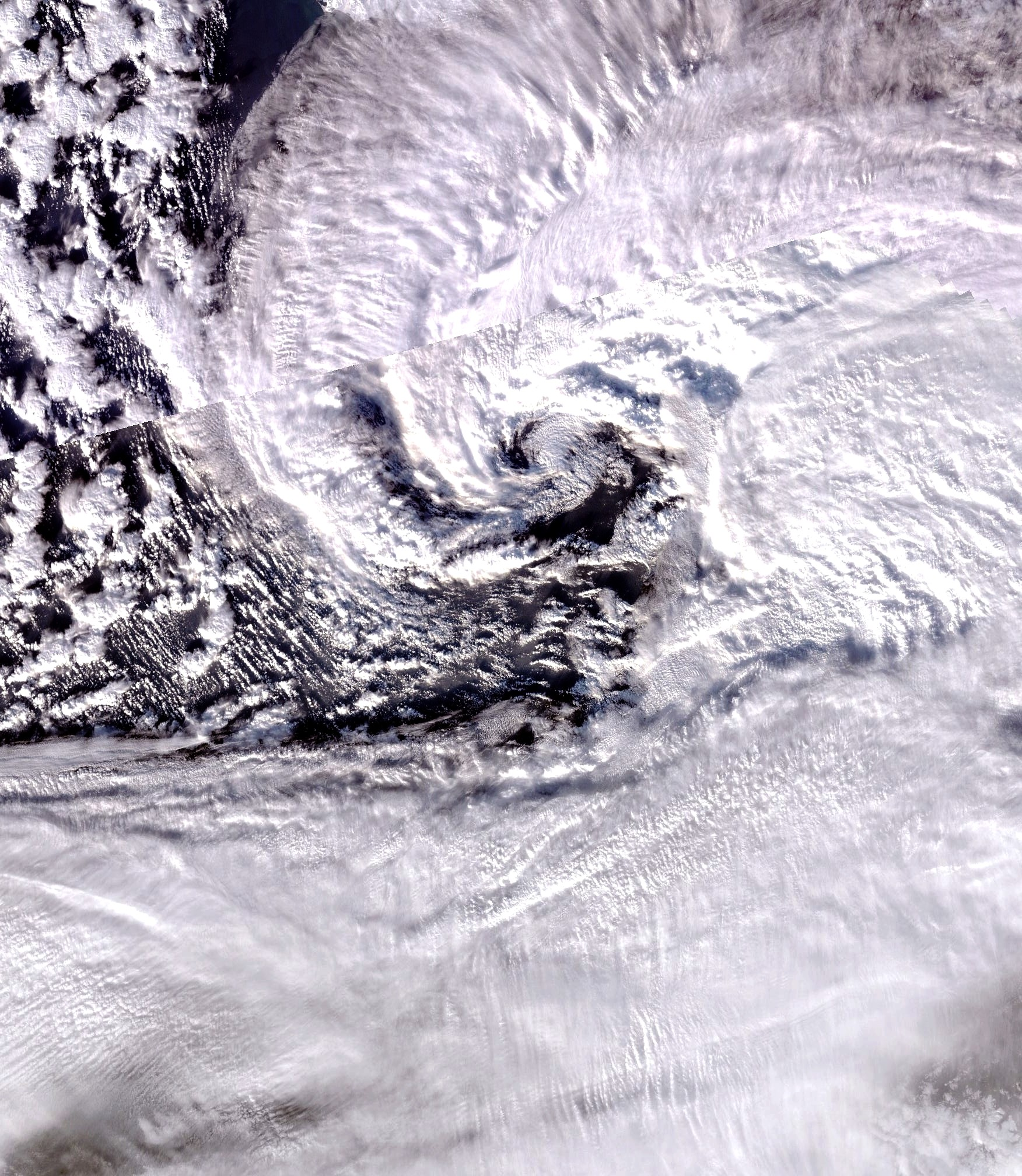
- Area affected: Norway, United Kingdom, Sweden
- Date of impact: 30 January – 2 February 2024
- Maximum wind gust: 249 km/h (155 mph) at a Landsverk weather station in Heltnin, Faroe Islands
- Lowest pressure: 941 hPa (27.79 inHg)
- Fatalities: 0
- Damage: Unspecified

This storm was named Ingunn on 30 January by the Norwegian Meteorological Institute and Margrit by the Free University of Berlin.

In Norway, a red warning of extremely strong gusts of wind was issued for parts of Nordfjord, Møre and Romsdal, Trøndelag and Helgeland. Wind gusts of 70-110 mph were anticipated from the afternoon of 31 January until the morning of 1 February. The strongest gusts were expected in the outer regions from Stad to Helgeland.

During the night to 1 February, the wind direction shifted west, possibly reaching hurricane strength in North Trøndelag and South Helgeland. Throughout 1 February, the wind became north-westerly, gradually diminishing, starting in the south. There was uncertainty about the low-pressure track on 1 February, with the potential for extremely strong wind gusts in Nordland, along with strong gusts in Troms and Finnmark later in the day. Coastal wind gusts of 90-110 mph and local interior gusts of 70-80 mph were expected. Parts of eastern Norway and western Norway might have experienced strong gusts at the yellow danger level on 31 January and 1 February. Northern Norway might have seen a transition to snow showers, with a possibility of 20–50 cm of snow in Nordland on 1 February, accompanied by strong winds.

Due to coincident tides, low pressure, and strong winds, high water levels were expected in Nordland overnight to 1 February, potentially leading to very high water levels in the Vestfjorden. Coastal damage might have occurred due to high water levels and waves. The Norwegian Water Resources and Energy Directorate issued its highest avalanche warnings over the southern and central parts of the country.

The storm was described as the strongest to hit Norway in more than three decades, with floods and power outages reported across the country. The center of Bodø was sealed off by police, citing "a danger to life and health". In Trøndelag, police received between 40 and 50 calls from affected residents. A bus with 14 passengers was blown off a road by strong winds in Lærdal, without causing injury. About 200 passengers were stranded overnight in Tromsø Airport.

In the United Kingdom a yellow wind warning was in force for Scotland, Northern England and Northern Ireland, where gusts of 70-80 and possibly 85 mph were expected in exposed northern locations.

In Sweden an orange wind warning was in force for the low terrain in the mountain chain in Västerbotten County and northernmost Jämtland County. The Swedish Meteorological and Hydrological Institute warned that the weather on 1 February would be windy, with very strong gusts to locally stormy gusts. This could have, among other things, led to limited access on roads due to fallen trees.

In the Faroe Islands a gust of 249 km/h (155 mph) was recorded at a Landsverk weather station, making this the strongest wind gust from a European windstorm in 2024.

=== Storm Karlotta (Paulina) ===
Storm Karlotta
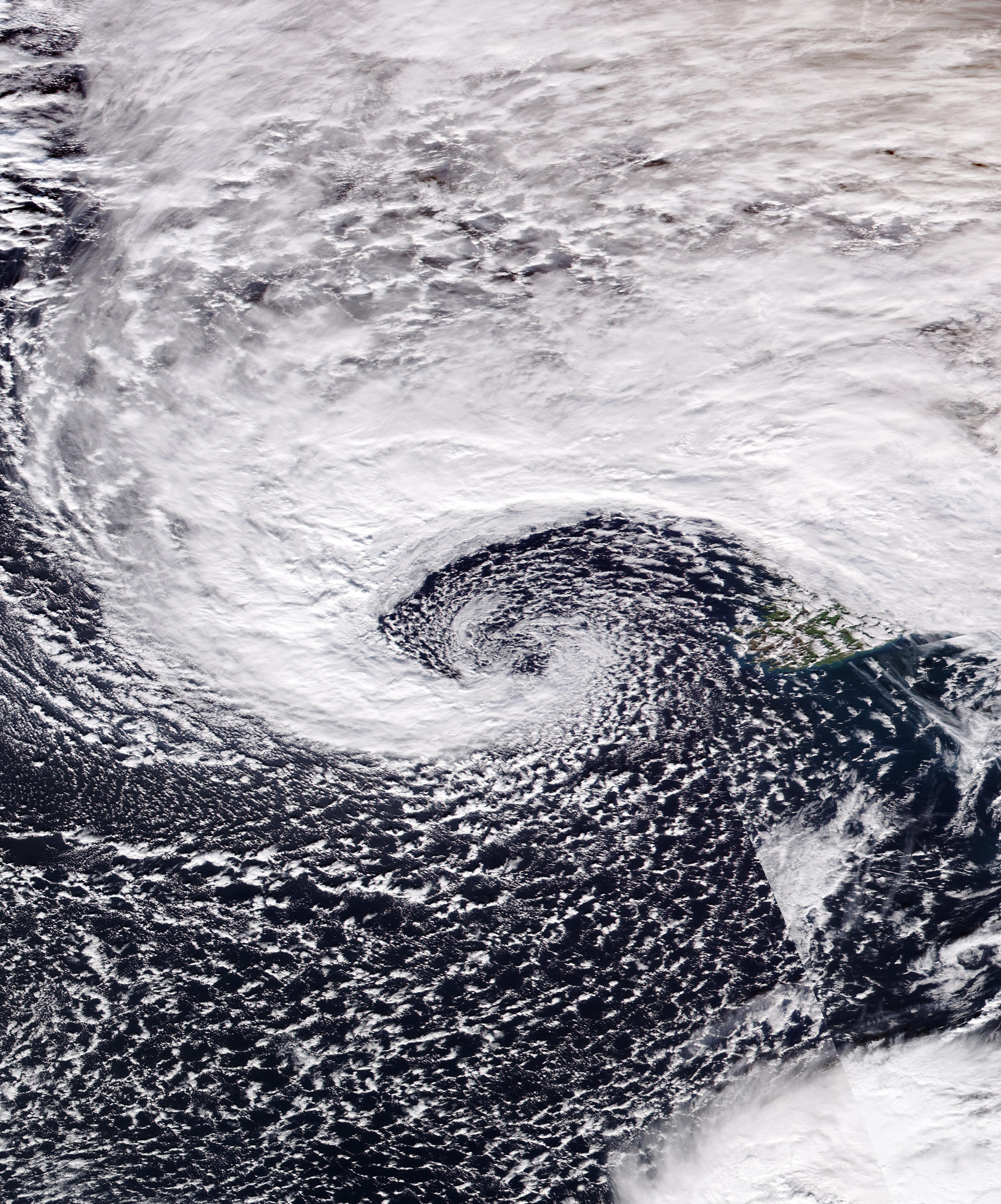
- Area affected: United Kingdom, France, Spain, Portugal, Ireland
- Date of impact: 6–10 February 2024
- Lowest pressure: 961 hPa (28.38 inHg)
- Fatalities: 0
- Damage: Unspecified

Storm Karlotta was named by the Spanish Meteorological Service on the 6 February, with the FUB naming it Paulina.

The storm brought strong winds and heavy rain to Spain and Portugal, where a yellow rain warning was in force. France also had rain and wind warnings where disruption was anticipated.

In the United Kingdom a yellow snow warning was in force for the Midlands, north-west England, north Wales and Northern Ireland, as well as a amber snow warning issued for north Wales and areas just east of Manchester, where 20–25 cm of snow was possible above 200 metres. However, in the yellow area 2–5 cm was expected widely with upwards of 10 cm on hills. Elsewhere, heavy rain was more likely further south, with snow showers continuing to move into northern Scotland. However, these showers were not associated with Storm Karlotta like the band of snow that was expected in the Midlands and Northern Ireland.

In Ireland, Met Éireann issued a status yellow snow-ice and rain warning for Dublin, Cavan, Meath, Kildare, Louth, Wexford, Carlow, Clare, Tipperary, Galway, Laois, Offaly, Westmeath, Donegal, Monaghan, Leitrim, Mayo, Roscommon, Sligo, Longford and Wicklow, with localised flooding.

=== Storm Louis (Wencke) ===
Storm Louis
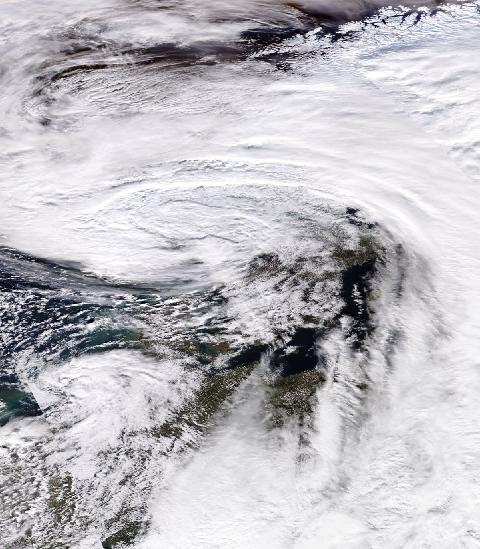
- Area affected: United Kingdom, France, Belgium, Netherlands, Germany, Denmark, Norway, Sweden
- Date of impact: 22–23 February 2024
- Maximum wind gust: 138 km/h (86 mph) – Groix, France.
- Lowest pressure: 960 hPa (28.35 inHg)
- Fatalities: 1
- Damage: Unspecified

Storm Louis was named by the Meteo France on 22 February, with the FUB naming it Wencke.

A yellow wind and rain warning was issued for the east and south-east of England due to a severe squall line, which resulted in intense rainfall and strong winds in the warned areas. There was also a rain warning for the south-west, where heavy rain was anticipated to cause disruption.

Additionally, an orange wind warning was in effect for northern parts of France, anticipating similar strong winds in that region.

Storm Louis hit the Netherlands the evening of 22 February, bringing with it strong winds with gusts up to 110 kilometres per hour. The meteorological institute KNMI issued a code yellow warning for the entire country, starting in the south and coastal provinces at 6:00 pm. In Belgium, the Met Office issued an amber code weather warning for powerful gusts of wind across Flanders. From 3pm, gusts of up to 110 kilometres per hour were possible, with locally even higher speeds being recorded.

There was one fatality in France: a man has drawn in his car in the Deux-Sèvres department.

=== Storm Dorothea (Yue) ===
Storm Dorothea
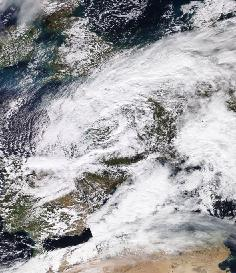
- Area affected: United Kingdom, Ireland, France, Spain, Italy, Tunisia, Algeria, Libya
- Date of impact: 23–29 February 2024
- Lowest pressure: 979 hPa (28.91 inHg)
- Fatalities: 0
- Damage: Unspecified

Storm Dorothea was one of two storms named by the Italian Meteorological Service (Servizio Meteorologico) on 26 February. The system was named Yue Free University of Berlin three days earlier on 23 February 2024, when it impacted Western Europe.

On 23 February, the system prompted the UK Met Office to issue two yellow rain warnings for the south-west and south-east of England. This was because of the heavy rain recently which left saturated soil across the south of the United Kingdom, with further flooding likely. According to GOV.UK there were still numerous flood alerts and warnings in force for areas in the south of the United Kingdom.

In France the Met Service issued a large yellow flood warning in, with an orange flood warning for Doubs, France. High river levels were anticipated to continue in the country. Spain also issued a broad coastal high surf warning for the north coast, along with a broad yellow wind warning with an orange rain warning for Interior de Pontevedra.

As Dorothea was named by the Italian Met Service, yellow wind and rain warnings were issued for much of the Italian Peninsula and France's Corsica. An orange snow, wind and rain warning was in force for north-western parts of Italy. Another orange wind and rain warning was issued for Sicily and Sardinia as well as the boot of Italy.

=== Storm Emil ===
Storm Emil
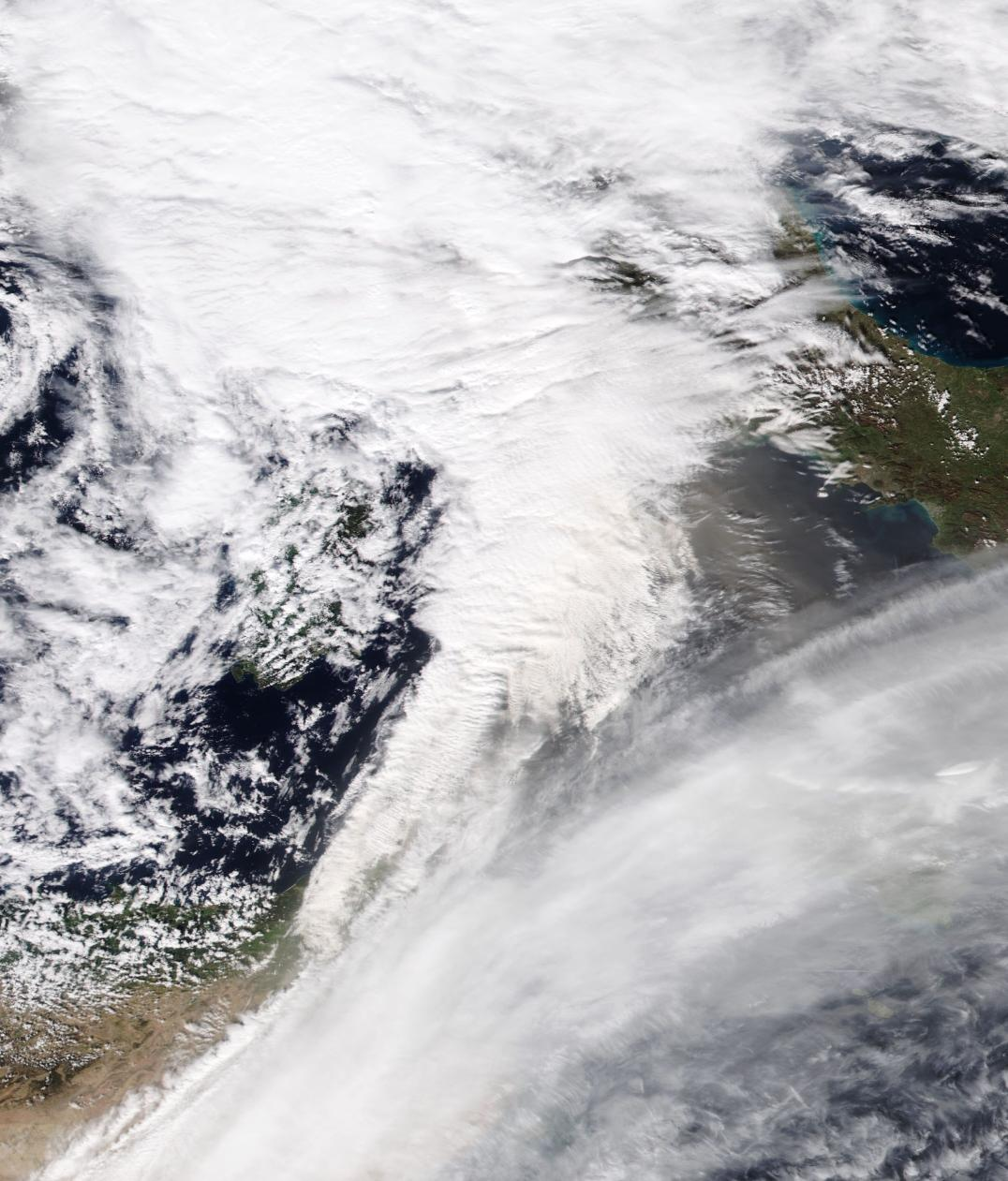
- Area affected: Italy, Tunisia, Algeria, Libya
- Date of impact: 26–28 February 2024
- Lowest pressure: 999 hPa (29.50 inHg)
- Fatalities: 0
- Damage: Unspecified

Storm Emil was the second of two storms named by the Italian Meteorological Service (Servizio Meteorologico) on 26 February 2024, with the other being Dorothea.

Storm Emil was expected the merge with Storm Dorothea and enhance rainfall and snowfall impacts in Italy. Numerous orange and yellow wind, rain and snow warnings were in force for the Italian peninsula and surrounding islands.

=== Storm Fedra (Carlotta) ===
Storm Fedra
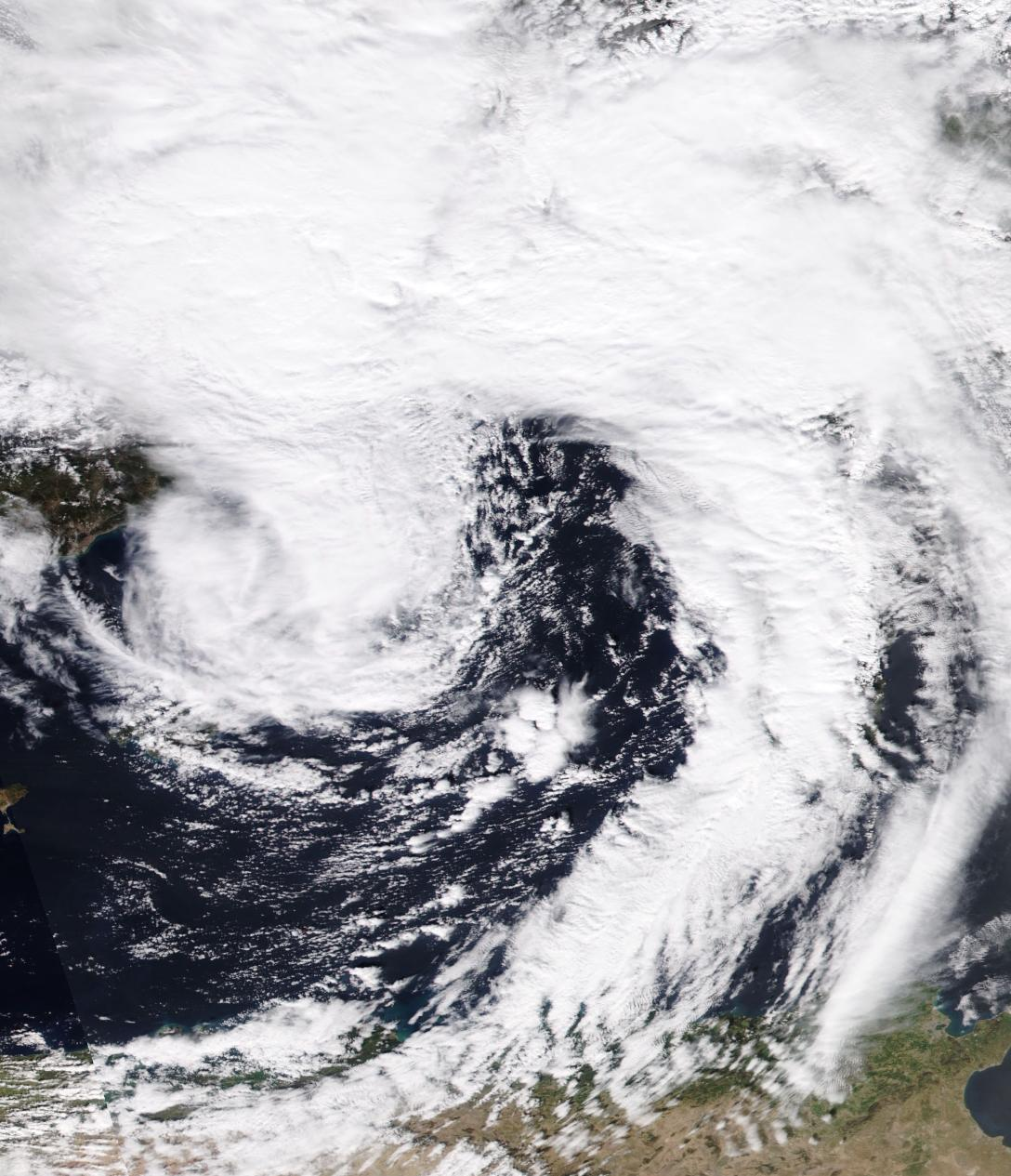
- Area affected: Italy, France, Greece
- Date of impact: 3–5 March 2024
- Lowest pressure: 992 hPa (29.29 inHg)
- Fatalities: 0
- Damage: Unspecified

Storm Fedra was named by the Italian Servizio Meteorologico on 3 March 2024. It was named Carlotta by Free University of Berlin the same day.

Yellow and orange wind and rain warnings were in force for the north west of Italy, including Rome, Florence, Bologna, Milan, Genoa and Turin.

There was also a severe red warning for snow and black ice also up for similar areas around the Turin area of Italy. There was also an orange wind and yellow rain warning for Sardinia.

Meteo France also issued a yellow rain, snow and ice warning for Upper Corsica, where thunderstorms and avalanches were possible.

=== Storm Monica (Elfi) ===
Storm Monica
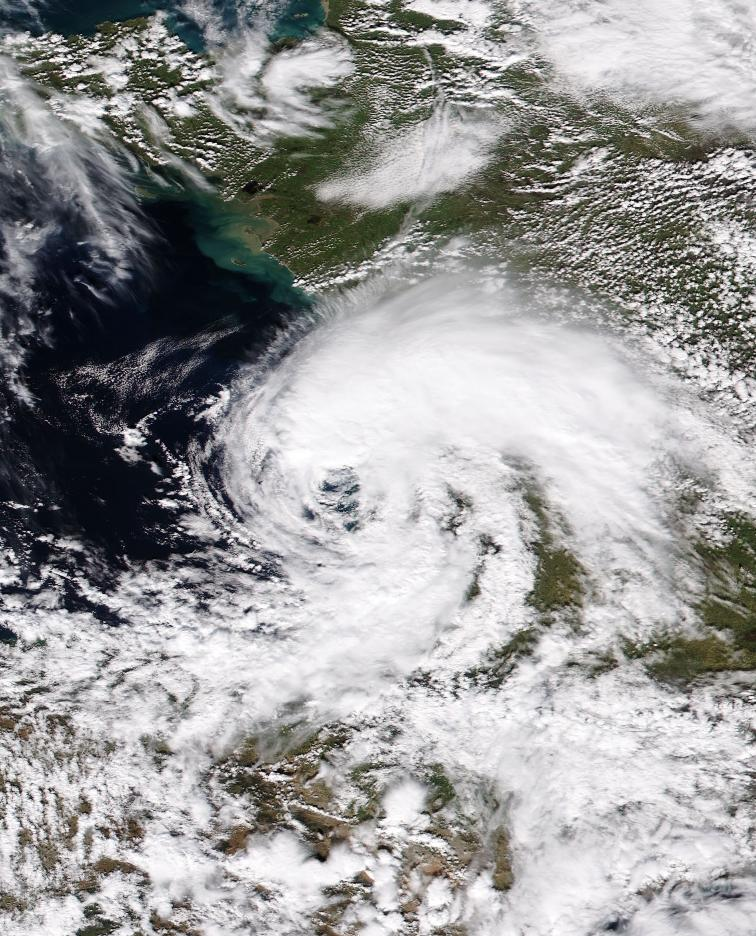
- Area affected: Portugal, Spain
- Date of impact: 8–11 March 2024
- Lowest pressure: 972 hPa (28.70 inHg)
- Fatalities: 0
- Damage: Unspecified

Storm Monica was named on 9 March 2024, and as Elfi the Free University of Berlin a day earlier on 8 March 2024.

Storm Monica was forecast to impact the Iberian Peninsula with heavy rain and strong winds. Portugal's Meteorological Agency (IPMA) issued a severe red coastal event warning from 6pm 9 March to 6am 10 March, where waves from the west/northwest with 7 to 8 metres (20–25 ft) of significant height, reaching a maximum height of 14 metres (45 ft). A broader orange coastal event warning was also in force, from 6pm 8 March to 6pm 10 March. There was also a yellow wind warning in force for strong winds from the west/southwest, with gusts of up to 75 km/h (45 mph) on the coast and up to 90 km/h (55 mph) in the highlands and up to 95 km/h (60 mph) in the mountains.

In Spain a yellow coastal event warning was in force for the north coast, with an orange warning in force for the north west coast. Other warnings include yellow snow warnings in interior parts of Spain. There was also a yellow wind warning for the south-east.

=== Storm Gabriele ===
Storm Gabriele
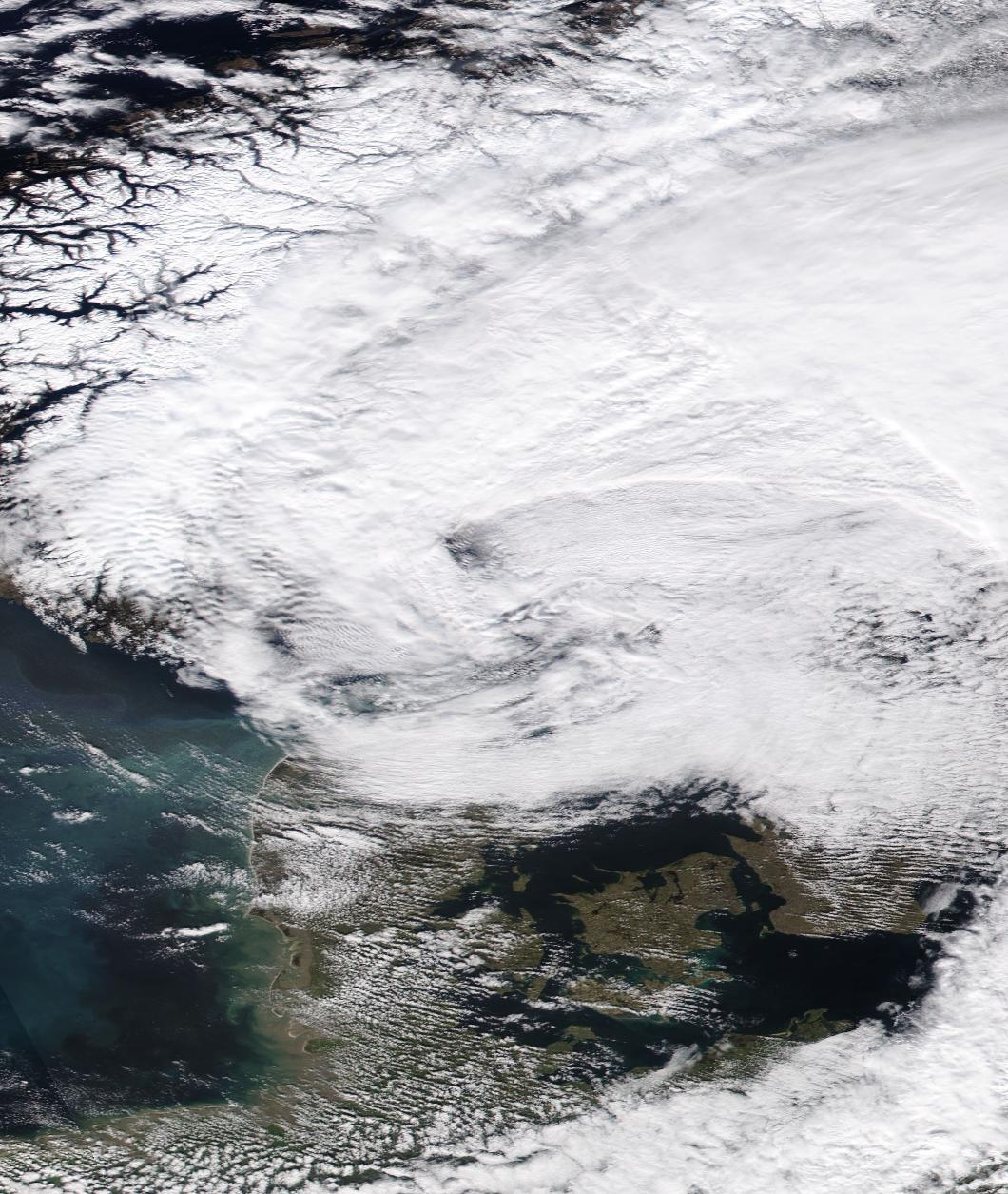
- Area affected: United Kingdom, Ireland, Netherlands, Norway, Sweden, Germany
- Date of impact: 13–17 March 2024
- Lowest pressure: 986 hPa (29.12 inHg)
- Fatalities: 0
- Damage: Unspecified

Storm Gabriele was named on 13 March 2024 by Free University of Berlin.

Gabriele was expected to bring heavy snow and strong winds to parts of Scandinavia, as well as heavy rain and strong winds to Denmark and Germany.

In Norway there were yellow snow and ice warnings as well as yellow wind warnings. There was also an orange severity icing on ships warning from the cold air and strong winds that were expected to blow a force 7 or 8.

In Germany there was a yellow level 1 wind warning for the north of the country, including Hamburg, Kiel, Schwerin and Neubrandenburg. An orange level 2 wind warning was in force across the German border with Denmark to Hindenburgdamm, and another from Rostock to Peenemünde.

=== Storm Nelson (Nadja) ===
Storm Nelson
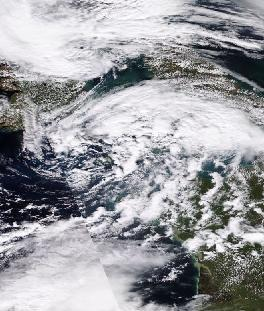
- Area affected: United Kingdom, Ireland, France, Spain, Portugal, Netherlands
- Date of impact: 26–29 March 2024
- Maximum wind gust: 114 mph (183 km/h; 99 kn) at Pointe Du Raz, France
- Lowest pressure: 956 hPa (28.23 inHg)
- Fatalities: 4
- Damage: Unspecified

Storm Nelson was named on 26 March 2024 by Spain's AEMET and Nadja by FUB.

The United Kingdom's Met Office issued a yellow rain warning for eastern Northern Ireland and a yellow wind warning for the south coast of England. 50 mph (80 km/h) winds widely were expected with 60–65 mph (97–105 km/h) expected in exposed southern areas. The weather might have impacted transport networks, including ferry services, and there was a "slight chance" of power cuts, it added. "There is a small chance that injuries and danger to life could occur from large waves and beach material being thrown onto sea fronts, coastal roads and properties."

Orange wind warnings were issued for the west of France and much of the Portuguese coast, with yellow wind warning issued for most of Spain.

On 27 March, a tornado hit Île d'Yeu in western France, affecting around 60 houses and uprooting trees, blowing off roofs, felling electricity poles, blowing out a bay window and slightly injuring one person. A large waterspout in the Tagus estuary made headlines the following day after it was caught on video looming over the Vasco da Gama bridge in Lisbon, Portugal.

Four people were killed during the storm in Spain in three separate incidents on 28 March, all of which involved the sea. Two of them were in Asturia: a tourist was killed after falling into the sea in Muros de Nalón, and a woman was killed in Cudillero after falling into the sea and being thrashed against some rocks. A Moroccan boy and a German man drowned near Tarragona, Catalonia, after the man entered the water to help the boy.

=== Storm Patricia ===
Storm Patricia
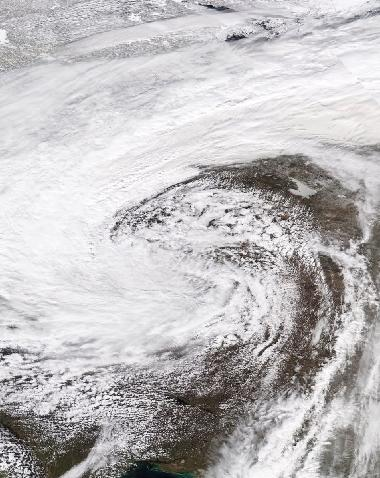
- Area affected: Poland, Estonia, Latvia, Lithuania, Sweden, Finland
- Date of impact: 1–3 April 2024
- Lowest pressure: 980 hPa (28.94 inHg)
- Damage: Unspecified

Storm Patricia was named on 1 April by Free University of Berlin.

The system was forecast to bring strong winds and heavy snowfall to parts of north-eastern Europe.

There were many yellow wind warnings in force, such as for eastern Poland, all of Lithuania and much of Estonia, Latvia, and southern Finland. Yellow wind and snow warnings also extended up the east coast of Sweden, including Stockholm. Snow and ice were expected to cause disruption across these countries, with Sweden having issued an orange snow and ice warning just north of the capital, Stockholm.

=== Storm Olivia (Sabine) ===
Storm Olivia
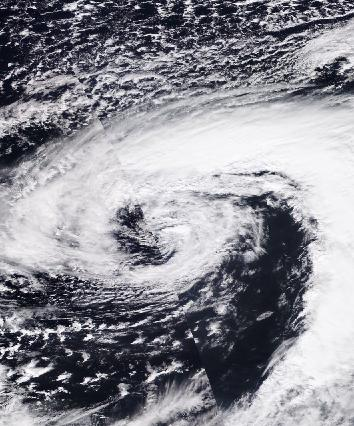
- Area affected: United Kingdom, Ireland, France, Spain, Portugal
- Date of impact: 2–5 April 2024
- Lowest pressure: 987 hPa (29.15 inHg)
- Damage: Unspecified

Storm Olivia was named by the Portuguese Met Service on 2 April 2024 and Sabine by the Free University of Berlin the following day on 3 April 2024.

The storm was named due to the threat of rain, especially along the north coast of Portugal and Spain, including The Azores.

On 2 April, Portugal's IPMA issued a yellow wind warning for northern, coastal parts of Portugal, including the city of Porto. Spain's AEMET issued an orange wind warning for the north-west coast of Spain, with a wider yellow warning expanding inland encompassing the orange warning.

On 4 April, the United Kingdom Met Office issued a yellow snow warning for central Scotland with a yellow rain warning just to the south, encompassing Glasgow.

=== Storm Kathleen (Timea) ===
Storm Kathleen
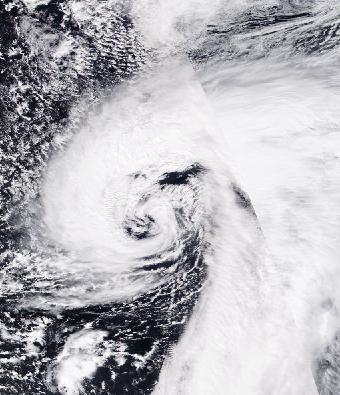
- Area affected: United Kingdom, Ireland
- Date of impact: 4–8 April 2024
- Maximum wind gust: 164 km/h (102 mph): Aonach Mor, Scotland
- Lowest pressure: 951 hPa (28.08 inHg)
- Power outages: 900,000
- Damage: Unspecified

Storm Kathleen was named by Met Éireann on 4 April 2024, and named as Timea by Free University of Berlin the following day, 5 April 2024.

The UK Met Office issued yellow wind warnings for western parts of the United Kingdom, including Northern Ireland, southern Scotland, north west England, west Wales, and parts of the south west, such as Cornwall. Deputy Chief Meteorologist Christoph Almond stated, "Gusts of 50 mph are expected quite widely on Saturday, while some exposed spots, particularly on the coast, will see 60 to 70 mph gusts with large waves also likely."

As this area of low pressure moved north-eastwards, it drew up unseasonably warm air from Iberia for a time. This warm air sae temperatures rise across the UK, causing some areas to see values above 20 °C for the first time this year. The locations likely to see the highest temperatures were in parts of East Anglia and Southeast England, where 21 °C or 22 °C was not out of the question briefly on Saturday.

Met Éireann issued a yellow warning for Ireland, orange wind warning for County Cork, County Kerry, County Galway, and County Mayo due to Storm Kathleen, which brought gale force southerly winds, including severe and damaging gusts, potentially leading to very difficult travel conditions, fallen trees, power outages, coastal flooding, and wave overtopping.

Preliminary reports suggested the strongest wind from Kathleen in Northern Ireland was recorded at 69 mph (111 km/h) at Orlock Head in County Down. However, in Scotland, an unofficial windspeed of 101 mph (162 km/h) was recorded at Cairn Gorm. This was awaiting verification from the Met Office.

Other strong winds recorded in Ireland include:

- Magilligan, County Londonderry – 57 mph (91 km/h)
- Thomastown, County Fermanagh – 56 mph (90 km/h)
- Castlederg, County Tyrone – 54 mph (86 km/h)
- Aldergrove, County Antrim – 54 mph (86 km/h)

However, according to the Met Office the highest wind gust was 102 mph (164 km/h), recorded at Aonach Mor, Scotland.

NIE Networks said about 400 customers were without power after high winds caused "a low level of damage to the electricity network. In the Republic of Ireland, 12,000 homes, farms and businesses were left without power as a result of Storm Kathleen. ESB Networks said the largest outages were in County Mayo, County Sligo, County Leitrim, County Laois and County Wicklow. Some flights, including all Aer Lingus services at Belfast City Airport, and ferry sailings, were cancelled.

In the United Kingdom, for the second time this year, part of the roof of Titanic Belfast was damaged by strong winds. The Met Office had warned of possible travel disruption, power cuts, and a risk of injuries from large waves. As of Saturday afternoon, the Environment Agency (EA) had 14 flood warnings – where flooding was expected – and 118 flood alerts in England. The EA also issued 45 red cautions for strong streams on the River Thames, advising users of all boats not to navigate. National Resources Wales issued five flood alerts across the country.

About 200 people had to be evacuated on Tuesday 9 April as the River Arun in west Sussex burst its banks with rainfall made worse by Storm Pierrick a few days later.

A family touring Scotland's North Coast 500 route were said to be "lucky to be alive" after their motorhome was reportedly blown down a hill as Storm Kathleen swept in across the country. The family of four and two dogs were still inside when the rented vehicle rolled over several times at a layby on the A896 near Shieldaig in Wester Ross on Sunday 7 April. The family, from Oxfordshire, managed to escape the wreckage with severe bruising.

=== Storm Pierrick (Vanessa) ===
Storm Pierrick
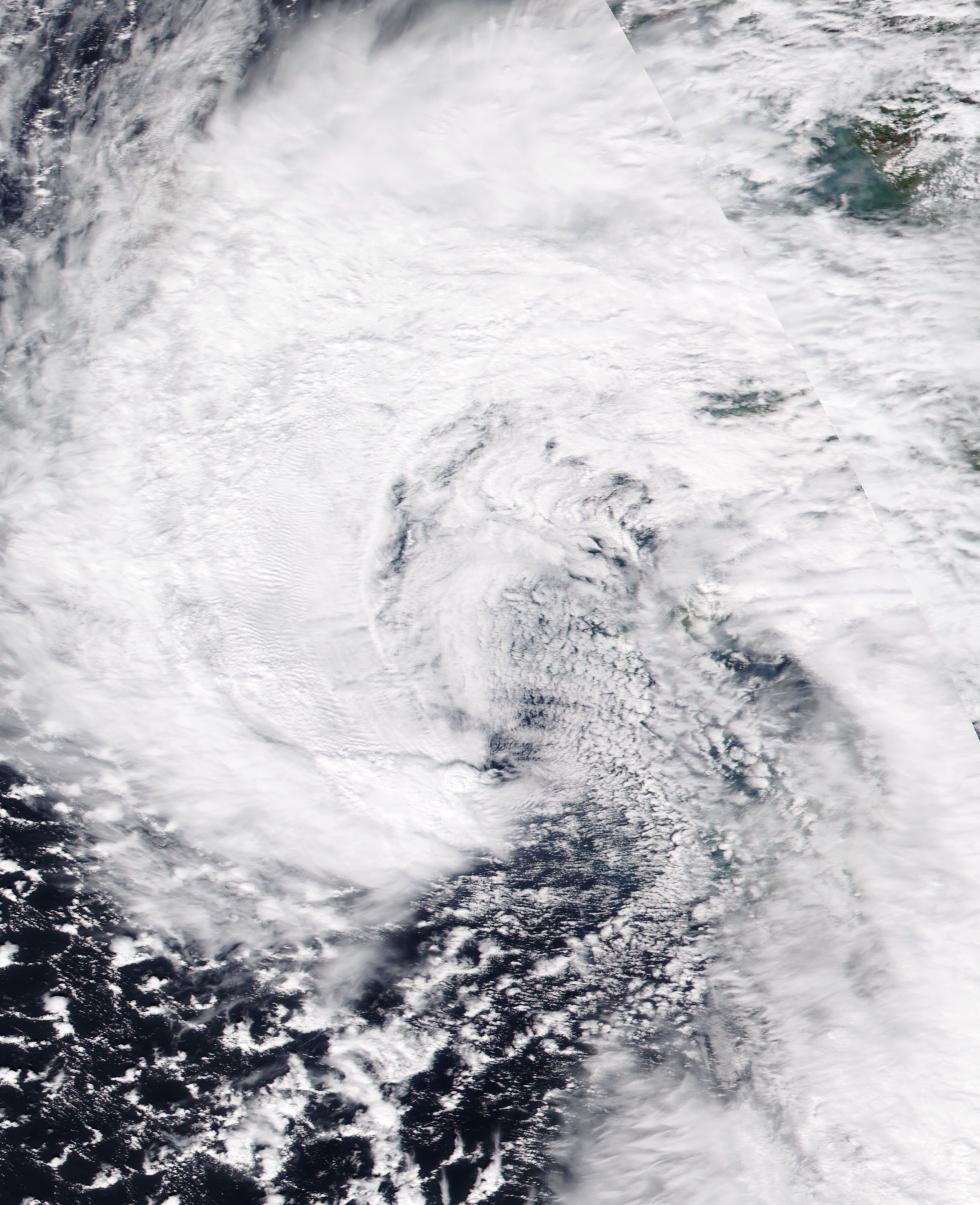
- Area affected: United Kingdom, France
- Date of impact: 8–10 April 2024
- Maximum wind gust: 65mph (104.6 km/h)
- Lowest pressure: 988 hPa, Truro, UK (via ZoomEarth)
- Fatalities: 2 (including 1 dog dead and 1 injured)
- Damage: Unspecified

Storm Pierrick was named by Meteo France on 8 April 2024 and Vanessa by Free University of Berlin a day prior on the 7 April 2024.

The storm mainly affected the United Kingdom, with the Met Office issuing yellow wind warnings. As of midday on 8 April, there was a yellow wind warning across the south-west, encompassing Cornwall and north Devon. Another yellow wind warning was in effect across the south coast of England from Chideock, Dorset through to Margate, Kent. On Tuesday, 9 April, the yellow warning extended to include the west coast of Wales, with another yellow warning, this time for rain, which encompassed south-west Scotland, through the central belt and up the Aberdeen coast.

Meteo France issued some yellow and orange warnings. Much of the country was covered in a yellow wind warning, with an orange wind warning in the north west of the country and another two in the north of the country, including Rouen and Évreux.

The low-pressure system brought the strongest winds to Cornwall and coastal parts of Devon and Somerset during the day and overnight (8-9 April). Then, as the system continued to track across the United Kingdom, the strong winds extended along many English Channel coasts, all the way to Kent, and north along the coasts of the Celtic and Irish Seas to Lancashire. These strong winds came in combination with large waves and one of the highest tides of the year, highlighting coastal areas for impacts. As the system developed it brought warmer air back into some south-eastern areas of England during the day, with the potential for some isolated thunder and lightning in the evening.

Record high tides were recorded across the south-coast of England, resulting in serious coastal flooding in many areas. The Severn Bridge was closed because of strong winds, but reopened on Tuesday afternoon. A station was swept away in Devon, and a beach café in Cornwall lost a seating area and three of its beach huts were dragged into the sea.

Evacuations in West Sussex went ahead after the River Arun overflowed its banks, with further warnings that flooding ight increase throughout Tuesday brought by Storm Kathleen, worsened by Storm Pierrick.

About 180 people were rescued overnight from Medmerry Holiday Park in Earnley, and about 15 from Ferry Road and Rope Walk in Littlehampton, West Sussex county council said. One person showing signs of hypothermia was taken to hospital.

=== Storm Renata (Yupadee) ===
Storm Renata (Yupadee)
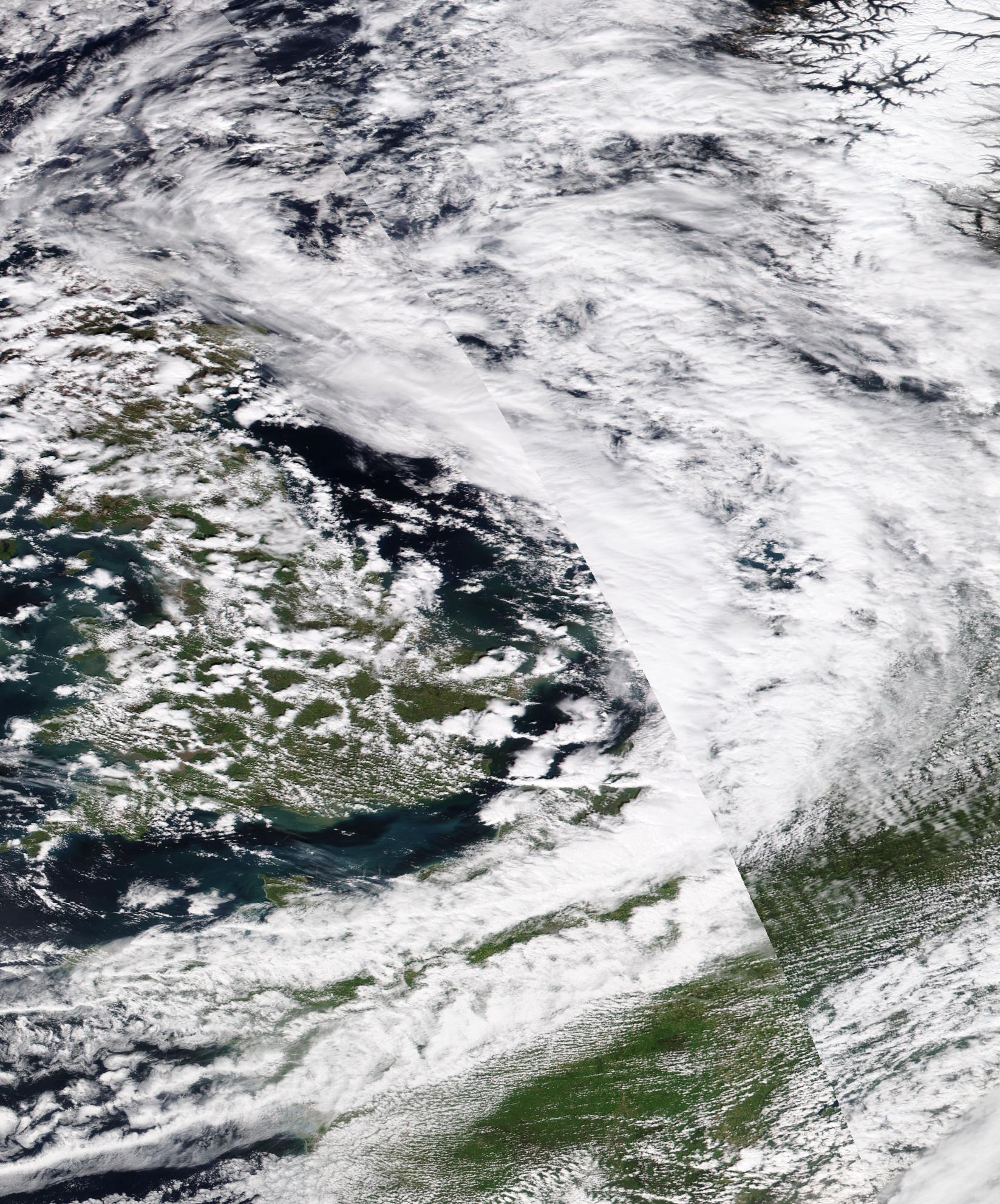
- Area affected: United Kingdom, Netherlands, Belgium, Germany
- Date of impact: 14–16 April 2024
- Lowest pressure: 986 hPa (29.12 inHg)
- Damage: Unspecified

Storm Renata was named by Meteo France on 14 April 2024 and Yupadee by Free University of Berlin. the same day.

The system, affecting the United Kingdom, Germany, Belgium, and the Netherlands, was anticipated to bring disruption. The Met Office forecast 50 mph winds, particularly in exposed southern areas. A squall line was expected to form, intensifying the winds as it moves through. In the United Kingdom, it passed through in the early morning and exited by 11 am on 15 April, then proceeded across western Europe (Belgium, Netherlands, and Germany).

The Met Office issued a broad yellow wind warning covering all of Northern Ireland and Wales as well as the rest of England, excluding the north east of England and all of Scotland. However, Royal Netherlands Meteorological Institute issued a yellow wind warning in response to that expected squall line, where winds of between 75 and 100 km/h (45 and 60 mph) could be recorded.

The Belgian Royal Meteorological Institute also had a yellow wind warning from around midday to 4pm on 15 April 2024. Germany had a level 2 orange wind warning up for most of the country.

In the United Kingdom, a tornado appeared to hit a town in Staffordshire, with police saying they attended the scene in Knutton in Newcastle-under-Lyme after strong gusts damaged roofs just before 6.45am. Pictures shared online appeared to show damaged fences and debris scattered across the street.

A tornado also appeared to hit a town in Nottinghamshire, with local news services attending a few locations in West Bridgford in Nottingham after 7.30am. More pictures online from the West Bridgford wire show damaged roofs and chimneys, and uprooted trees spread across 10 different roads.

=== Storm Gori ===
Storm Gori
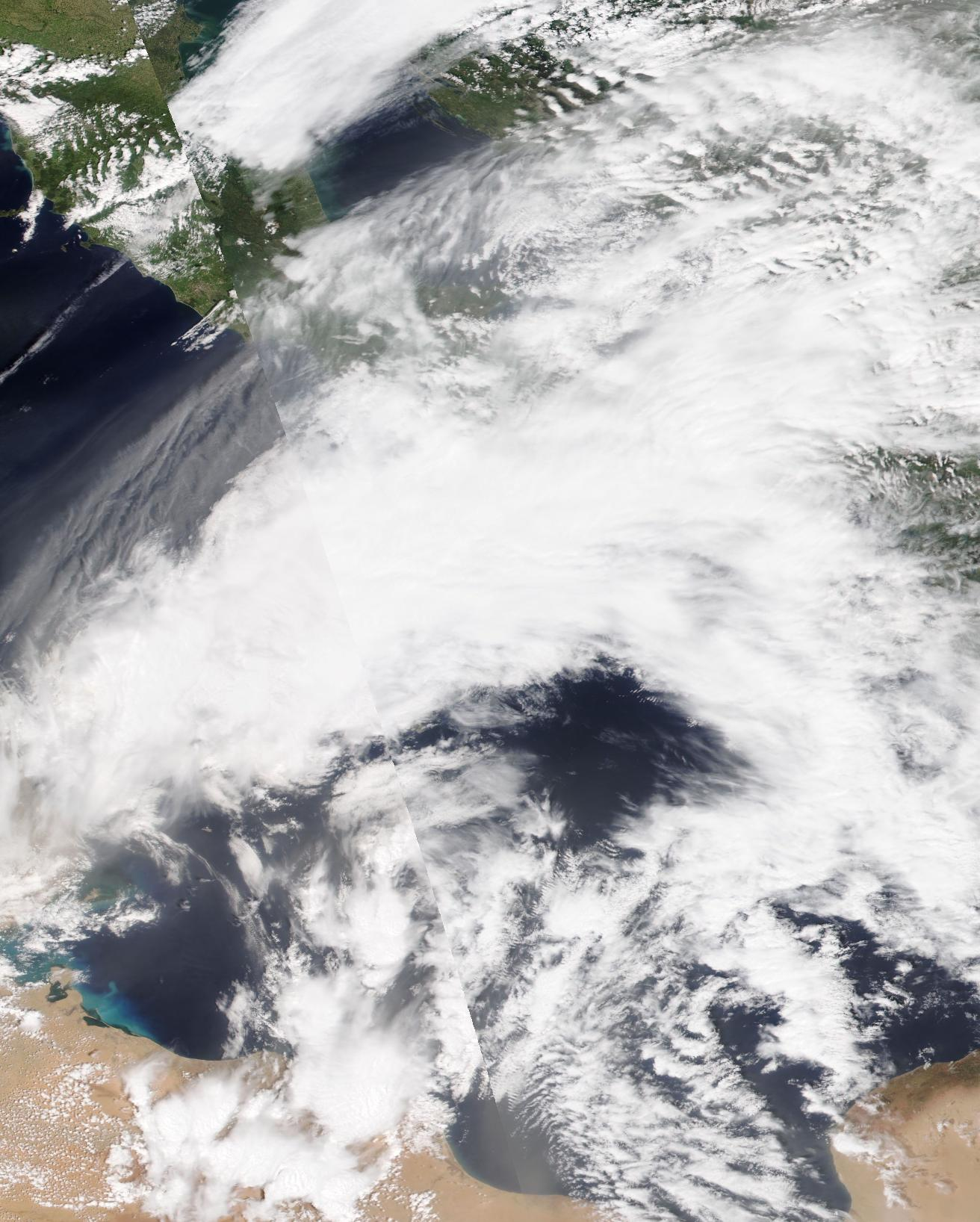
- Area affected: Italy, Croatia, Kosovo, Bulgaria, Bosnia & Herzegovina, Romania
- Date of impact: 17–19 April 2024
- Lowest pressure: 990 hPa (29.23 inHg)
- Damage: Unspecified

Storm Gori was named by Servizio Meteorologico on 17 April 2024.

An orange wind warning was issued for the islands of Sardinia and Sicily and for the Calabria region of southern Italy. Meanwhile, yellow wind, rain and thunderstorm warnings remained in effect for parts of Croatia, Kosovo, Bulgaria, Bosnia & Herzegovina, and Romania.

=== Storm Radha ===
Storm Radha
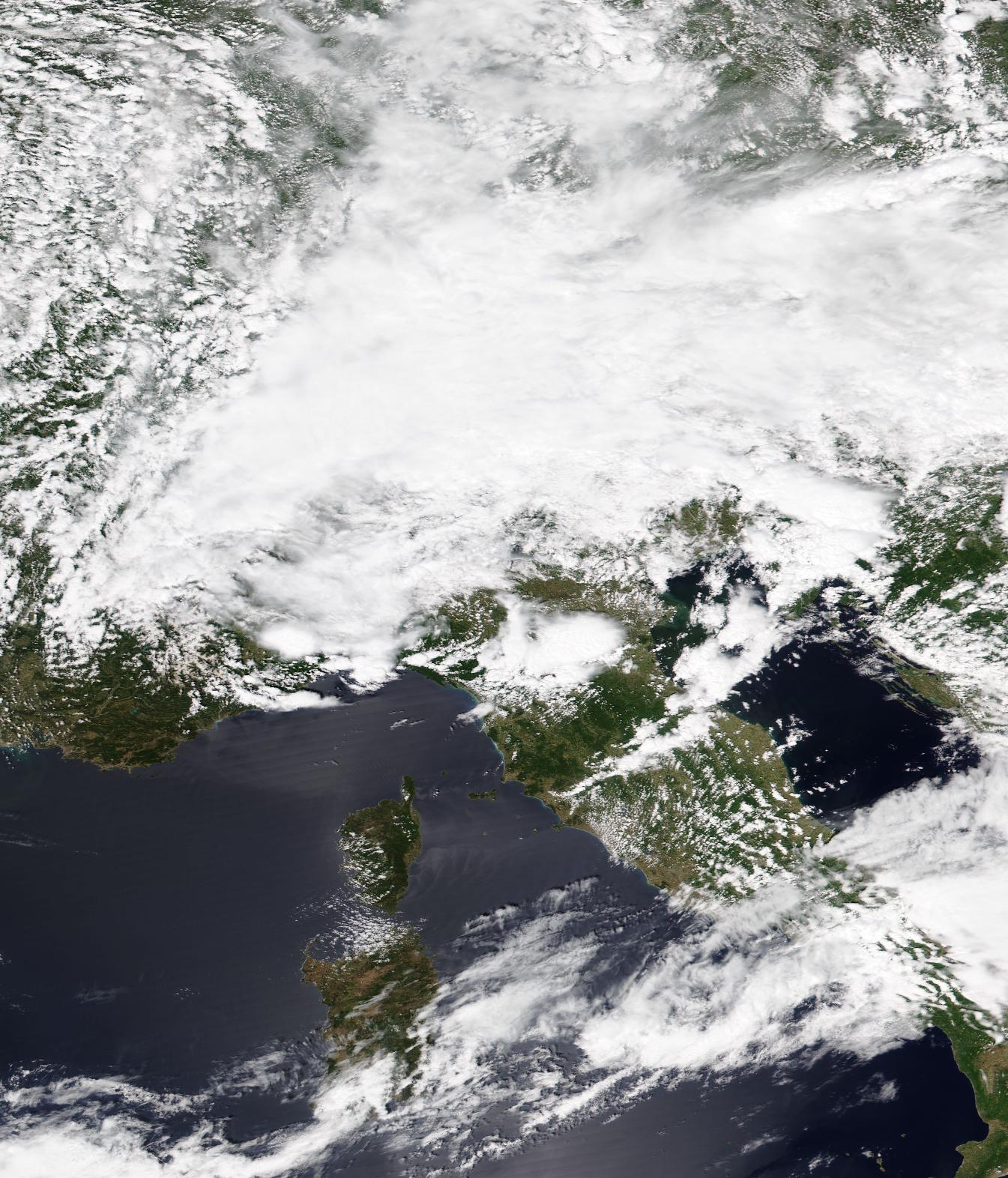
- Area affected: Switzerland, Italy, Germany
- Date of impact: 31 May – 3 June 2024
- Lowest pressure: 999 hPa (29.50 inHg)
- Damage: Unspecified

Storm Radha was named on 31 May 2024 by Free University of Berlin on behalf of Meteo Swiss, Switzerland's meteorological service.

The system prompted warnings to be issued with heavy thundery showers causing localised impacts, leading Switzerland to name the system.

=== Storm Lilian (Ursula) ===
Storm Lilian
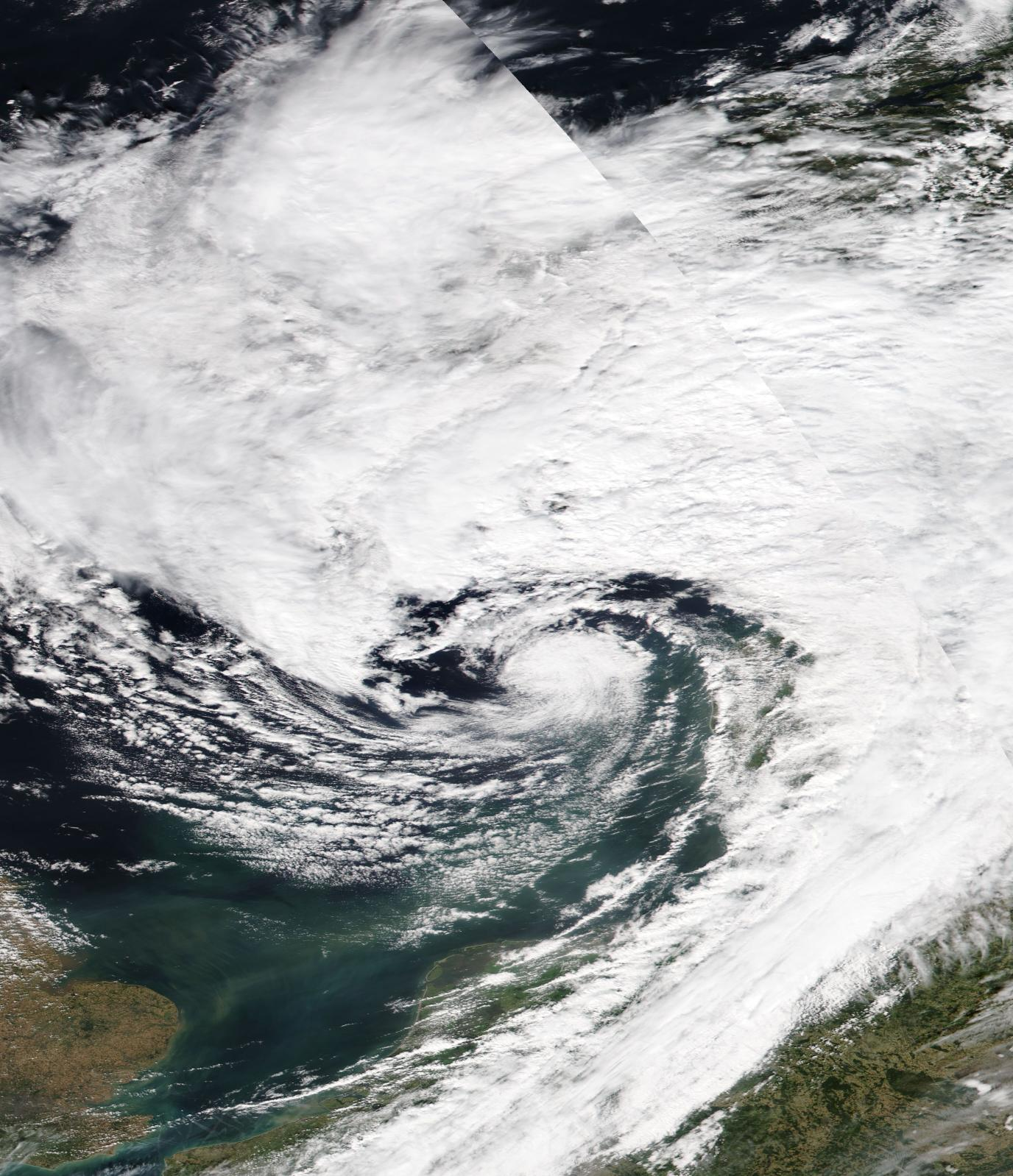
- Area affected: United Kingdom, Ireland, Denmark, Norway, Sweden, Finland
- Date of impact: 22–24 August 2024
- Maximum wind gust: 94 km/h (58 mph), Vlissingen, Netherlands
- Lowest pressure: 981 hPa (28.97 inHg)
- Damage: Unspecified

Storm Lilian was named by the United Kingdom Met Office and Ursula by Free University of Berlin on 22 August 2024.

Lilian was the twelfth named storm of this storm naming season: this was the furthest through the list of names the Western European storm naming group had got since storm naming was introduced in 2015.

There were reports of cancelled festivals, and outdoor furniture like tents was reported being lifted off the ground. Storm Lilian felled trees and left thousands of homes without power across East Yorkshire and Lincolnshire. Strong winds and heavy rainfall battered the region and yellow weather warnings of floods were put in place.

The Humber Bridge was closed to high-sided and "vulnerable" vehicles like caravans after recording average wind speeds of 55 mph (88 km/h). Footage showed one lorry almost toppling over.

Two flights between Belfast and London were cancelled on Friday as Storm Lilian tracked across parts of the United Kingdom and Ireland. Strong winds of up to 80 mph were forecast in northern parts of England and Wales on Friday, with travel disruption, flooding, power cuts and dangerous conditions near coastal areas expected. British Airways cancelled 16 flights scheduled to take off from Heathrow on Friday, and delayed others, according to the airline's website. The cancellations included international flights to Italy, Switzerland and the United States as well as domestic journeys to Scotland and Northern Ireland.

In other places, Denmark issued a yellow wind warning for the disruption expected, while Sweden and Norway issued yellow wind warnings around the coast. Finland also issued a yellow wind warning.

== Season effects ==
Storm	FUB name	Dates active	Highest wind gust	Lowest pressure	First reported by	Areas affected	Fatalities (+missing)	Damage	Refs
Agnes	Kilian	25–29 September 2023	135 km/h (84 mph), Capel Curig, United Kingdom	970 hPa (28.64 inHg)	United Kingdom	United Kingdom, Ireland	0	Moderate	
Babet	Viktor	16–22 October 2023	185 km/h (115 mph) Cairn Gorm, United Kingdom	977 hPa (28.85 inHg)	United Kingdom	Spain, Portugal, France, Ireland, United Kingdom (especially Angus, Scotland), Germany, Denmark, Sweden	15 (1)	Major	
Aline	Wolfgang	18–27 October 2023	146 km/h (91 mph): at Quiberon, France	965 hPa (28.50 inHg)	Spain	Iberian Peninsula, Portugal, Spain, France, Jersey, Guernsey, Belgium, Switzerland, Italy	0	Unspecified	
Bernard	Xanthos	21–26 October 2023	Unspecified	995 hPa (29.38 inHg)	Portugal	Morocco, Iberian Peninsula, France, United Kingdom, Portugal, Spain	2	Unspecified	
Celine	Benj	28 October–3 November 2023	Unspecified	985 hPa (29.09 inHg)	Portugal	Portugal, Spain, France, Iberian Peninsula	1	Unspecified	
Ciarán	Emir	29 October–4 November 2023	207 km/h (129 mph): Pointe du Raz, France	953 hPa (28.14 inHg)	United Kingdom	Ireland, United Kingdom, Benelux, France, Spain, Czech Republic, Italy, Channel Islands	16	Major	
Domingos	Fred	3–5 November 2023	Unspecified	960 hPa (28.35 inHg)	Spain	Portugal, Spain, France, United Kingdom, Ireland, Belgium, Channel Islands (indirectly), Iberia, Andalusia, Balearic Islands	1	Moderate	
Elisa	Helmoe	9–11 November 2023	Unspecified	990 hPa (29.23 inHg)	France	France, Channel Islands, Ireland	0	Minor	
Debi	n/a	12–13 November 2023	145 km/h (90 mph): at North Pennines, United Kingdom	970 hPa (28.64 inHg)	Ireland	Ireland, United Kingdom, Netherlands	0	Major	
Frederico	Linus	15–21 November 2023	Unspecified	995 hPa (29.38 inHg)	France	France, United Kingdom, Channel Islands, Belgium, Germany, Switzerland, Poland, Czech Republic, Slovakia, Hungary, Turkey, Moldova, Ukraine, Romania, Serbia, Bulgaria, Israel, Cyprus, Georgia, Syria, Armenia	Unspecified	Major	
Alexis	n/a	22–24 November 2023	Unspecified	1,000 hPa (29.53 inHg)	Italy	Italy (especially Sicily, Lampedusa, Pantelleria), Algeria, Egypt, Libya, Tunisia, Malta, Albania, Bosnia and Herzegovina, Bulgaria, Croatia, Kosovo, Montenegro, North Macedonia, Romania, Serbia, Slovenia	Unspecified	Moderate	
Bettina	Phil	25–28 November 2023	Unspecified	965 hPa (28.50 inHg)	Italy	Italy, Turkey, Greece, Moldova, Russia, Romania, Bulgaria, Serbia, Albania, Bosnia and Herzegovina, Kosovo, Montenegro, North Macedonia, Croatia, Slovenia, Ukraine (especially Crimea), Estonia, Latvia, Lithuania	22	Major	
Oliver	FUB assigned	28–30 November 2023	Unspecified	990 hPa (29.23 inHg)	Germany	Germany, Czech Republic, Slovakia, Italy, Balkan Peninsula, Poland, Moldova, Ukraine, Baltics	1	Moderate	
Ciro	n/a	30 November–3 December 2023	Unspecified	991 hPa (29.26 inHg)	Italy	Spain, Portugal, France, Italy, Croatia, Poland, Czech Republic	Unspecified	Moderate	
Elin	Vanja	9–10 December 2023	130 km/h (81 mph): at Capel Curig, United Kingdom	980 hPa (28.94 inHg)	Ireland	Ireland, United Kingdom	0	Moderate	
Fergus	Walter	9–11 December 2023	129 km/h (80 mph): at North Pennines, United Kingdom	979 hPa (28.91 inHg)	Ireland	Ireland, United Kingdom	0	Major	
Pia	Zoltan	20–22 December 2023	185 km/h (115 mph): at Cairn Gorm summit, United Kingdom	960 hPa (28.34 inHg)	Denmark	United Kingdom, Scandinavia, Netherlands, Belgium, Germany	6 (1)	Major	
Gerrit	Bodo	26–30 December 2023	143 km/h (89 mph): at Fair Isle, Scotland	972 hPa (28.70 inHg)	United Kingdom	United Kingdom, Ireland, Norway	3	Major	
Geraldine	Costa	30 December 2023 – 1 January 2024	Unspecified	970 hPa (28.64 inHg)	France	United Kingdom, Ireland, France	Unspecified	Moderate	
Henk	Annelie	2–5 January 2024	151 km/h (94 mph): at The Needles, Isle of Wight, United Kingdom	975 hPa (28.79 inHg)	United Kingdom	United Kingdom, Netherlands, France, Denmark, Germany, Sweden, Poland, The Baltics	2	Major	
Brigitta	FUB assigned	3–6 January 2024	Unspecified	987 hPa (29.15 inHg)	Germany	Germany, United Kingdom, Netherlands, France, Belgium	Unspecified	Major	
Hipolito	n/a	9–14 January 2024	Unspecified	972 hPa (28.70 inHg)	Portugal	Azores	Unspecified	Minor	
Irene	Gertrud	14–18 January 2024	Unspecified	982 hPa (29.00 inHg)	France	France, Spain, Canary Islands, Portugal, Azores, Germany, Poland, Switzerland	Unspecified	Major	
Juan	n/a	18–20 January 2024	Unspecified	1,002 hPa (29.59 inHg)	Spain	Spain, Portugal	Unspecified	Moderate	
Isha	Iris	19–23 January 2024	199 km/h (124 mph): at Cairnwell, Aberdeenshire	947 hPa (27.96 inHg)	United Kingdom	United Kingdom, Ireland, Netherlands, Norway, Denmark, Sweden	4	Major	
Jocelyn	Jitka	22–26 January 2024	230 km/h (140 mph) at Cairngorm Summit, Scotland	961 hPa (28.38 inHg)	Ireland	United Kingdom, Ireland, Denmark, Norway, Sweden, Germany, Poland, Estonia, Latvia, Lithuania	1	Major	
Avgi	n/a	28–31 January 2024	Unspecified	1,011 hPa (29.85 inHg)	Greece	Greece, Israel, Cyprus, Egypt	Unspecified	Minor	
Ingunn	Margrit	30 January – 2 February 2024	249 km/h (155 mph) at a Landsverk weather station, Faroe Islands	941 hPa (27.79 inHg)	Norway	Norway, United Kingdom, Sweden	Unspecified	Major	
Karlotta	Paulina	6–10 February 2024	Unspecified	961 hPa (28.38 inHg)	Spain	United Kingdom, Spain, Portugal, France	Unspecified	Moderate	
Louis	Wencke	22–23 February 2024	136 km/h (85 mph) at Frederikshavn, Denmark	959 hPa (28.32 inHg)	France	United Kingdom, France, Belgium, Netherlands, Denmark, Norway	Unspecified	Moderate	
Dorothea	Yue	23–29 February 2024	Unspecified	980 hPa (28.94 inHg)	Italy	United Kingdom, Ireland, France, Spain, Italy	Unspecified	Moderate	
Emil	n/a	26–28 February 2024	Unspecified	1,006 hPa (29.71 inHg)	Italy	Italy, Tunisia, Algeria, Libya	Unspecified	Moderate	
Fedra	Carlotta	3–5 March 2024	Unspecified	1,000 hPa (29.53 inHg)	Italy	Italy, France, Greece	Unspecified	Moderate	
Monica	Elfi	8–9 March 2024	Unspecified	972 hPa (28.70 inHg)	France	Spain, Portugal	Unspecified	Major	
Gabriele	FUB assigned	13–17 March 2024	Unspecified	994 hPa (29.35 inHg)	Germany	United Kingdom, Ireland, Norway, Sweden, Denmark, Germany	Unspecified	Moderate	
Nelson	Nadja	26–29 March 2024	183 km/h (114 mph): at Pointe Du Raz, France	950 hPa (28.05 inHg)	Spain	United Kingdom, Ireland, Spain, France, Portugal, Netherlands	4	Major	
Patricia	FUB assigned	1–3 April 2024	Unspecified	979 hPa (28.91 inHg)	Germany	Poland, Estonia, Latvia, Lithuania, Sweden, Finland	Unspecified	Moderate	
Olivia	Sabine	2–5 April 2024	Unspecified	969 hPa (28.61 inHg)	Portugal	United Kingdom, Ireland, Spain, France, Portugal	Unspecified	Moderate	
Kathleen	Timea	4–8 April 2024	164 km/h (102 mph) at Aonach Mor, Scotland	953 hPa (28.14 inHg)	Ireland	United Kingdom, Ireland	Unspecified	Major	
Pierrick	Vanessa	8–10 April 2024	Unspecified	985 hPa (29.09 inHg)	France	United Kingdom, France	Unspecified	Major	
Renata	Yupadee	14–16 April 2024	Unspecified	988 hPa (29.18 inHg)	France	United Kingdom, Netherlands, Belgium, Germany	Unspecified	Major	
Gori	n/a	17–19 April 2024	Unspecified	997 hPa (29.44 inHg)	Italy	Italy, Croatia, Kosovo, Bulgaria, Bosnia & Herzegovina, Romania	Unspecified	Minor	
Radha	FUB assigned	31 May – 3 June 2024	Unspecified	1,005 hPa (29.68 inHg)	Switzerland	Switzerland, Italy, Germany	Unspecified	Minor	
Lilian	Ursula	22–24 August 2024	Unspecified	Unspecified	United Kingdom	United Kingdom, Ireland, Denmark, Norway, Sweden, Finland	Unspecified	Major	

== See also ==
- Weather of: 2023, 2024
- Tropical cyclones in: 2023, 2024
- 2023–24 North American winter
- List of historical European windstorm names
