= Department of Philosophy, King's College London =

Academic department at King's College London

Coordinates: 51.511850°N 0.115586°W

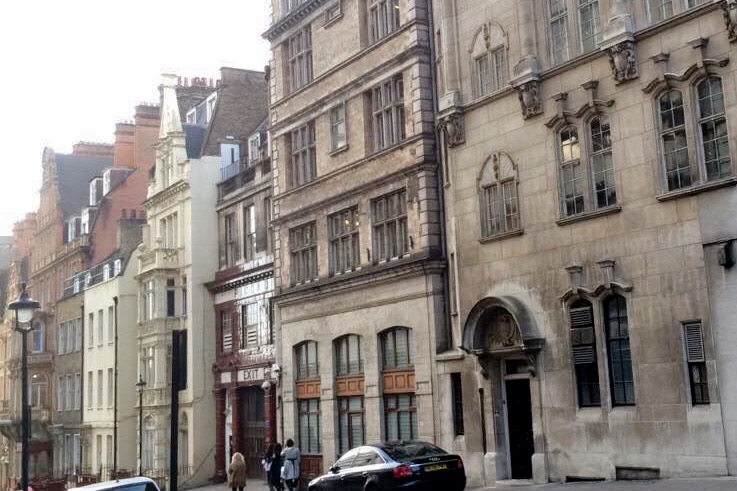
- King's College buildings on Surrey Street
- Established: 1906 - Department of Philosophy and Psychology; 1912 - Department of Philosophy
- Parent institution: Faculty of Arts and Humanities, King's College London
- Location: Surrey Street, Westminster, London, United Kingdom
- Website: Department of Philosophy

The Department of Philosophy is an academic division in the Faculty of Arts and Humanities at King's College London. It is one of the largest centres for the study of philosophy in the United Kingdom.

== History ==
For over half a century since the Anglican foundation of King's College in 1829, the study of philosophy was restricted to courses within the Department of Theology and the Department of English Literature. In 1906 a separate Department of Philosophy and Psychology was explicitly established, and in 1912 Philosophy split to form its own department.

The department is located in the Philosophy Building on Surrey Street, a set of three adjacent townhouses joined through a series of corridors and forming part of the Strand Campus of King's College. The vaults along the back of the building are those containing the old Roman Baths on Strand Lane.

In 1989, Sir Richard Sorabji founded the King's College Centre for Philosophical Studies at the department with the aim of promoting philosophy to the wider public.

== Traditions ==
The Department of Philosophy owns a historic bar on its premises in Surrey Street, officially the King's College Sports & Social Club Bar but referred to informally as simply the Philosophy Bar. Management of the bar was taken over by the King's College London Students' Union in 2016. However, the bar was closed in 2020 in response to COVID-19 restrictions, and despite a petition to KCL and the KCLSU which received 680 signatures, the bar remains closed.

Academic staff and students of the department also make an annual trip to Cumberland Lodge, a Grade II listed country house in Windsor Great Park. There is a programme of lectures, communal meals and other activities, including an annual football match played between staff and students.

Student life in the department is administered mainly by the King's College London Philosophy Society.

== Rankings ==
The Department of Philosophy at King's ranks highly in both national and global rankings.

The Philosophical Gourmet Report lists the department at 4th in the UK and 26th in the English-speaking world.

QS World University Rankings places the department at 4th in the UK and 9th globally in 2021.

== Emeritus faculty ==
- Dov Gabbay, Augustus De Morgan Professor Emeritus of Logic
- Raimond Gaita, Emeritus Professor of Moral Philosophy
- Jim Hopkins, Reader Emeritus in Philosophy
- Ruth Kempson, Emeritus Professor of Linguistics
- Shalom Lappin, Emeritus Professor of Computational Linguistics
- Mary Margaret McCabe, Emeritus Professor of Ancient Philosophy
- Wilfried Meyer-Viol, Emeritus Lecturer in Computational Linguistics
- John Milton, Emeritus Professor of the History of Philosophy
- David-Hillel Ruben, Emeritus Professor of Philosophy
- Anthony Savile, Emeritus Professor of Philosophy
- Gabriel Segal, Emeritus Professor of Philosophy
- Sir Richard Sorabji CBE FBA FKC, Emeritus Professor of Philosophy and founder of the King's College Centre for Philosophical Studies
- Charles Travis, Emeritus Professor of Philosophy

== Former faculty ==
- Father Brian Evan Anthony Davies, former Tutorial Assistant
- John Gardner FBA, former Reader in Legal Philosophy
- Verity Harte, former Reader in Philosophy
- Christopher Peacocke, former Susan Stebbing Professor of Philosophy
- Sherrilyn Roush, former Peter Sowerby Chair in Philosophy and Medicine
- R. Mark Sainsbury, former Susan Stebbing Professor of Philosophy
- Roger Steare, former Reader in History of Western Philosophy
- L. Susan Stebbing, former Lecturer in Philosophy
- Peter Vardy, former Lecturer in Philosophy of Religion
- Alexander Bird
- Maria Rosa Antognazza, Professor of Philosophy

== Notable alumni ==
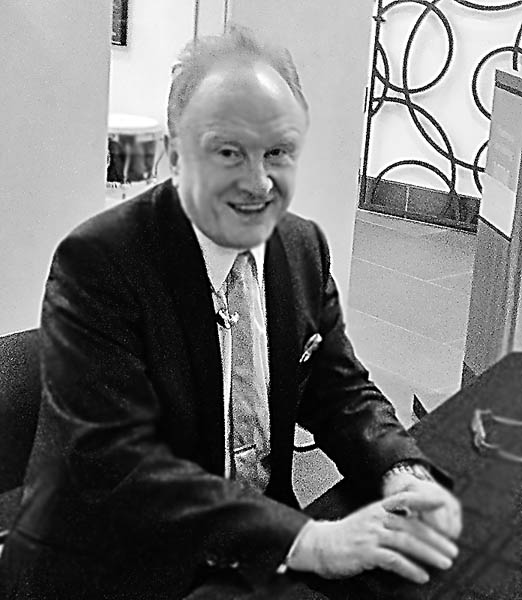
Peter Asher

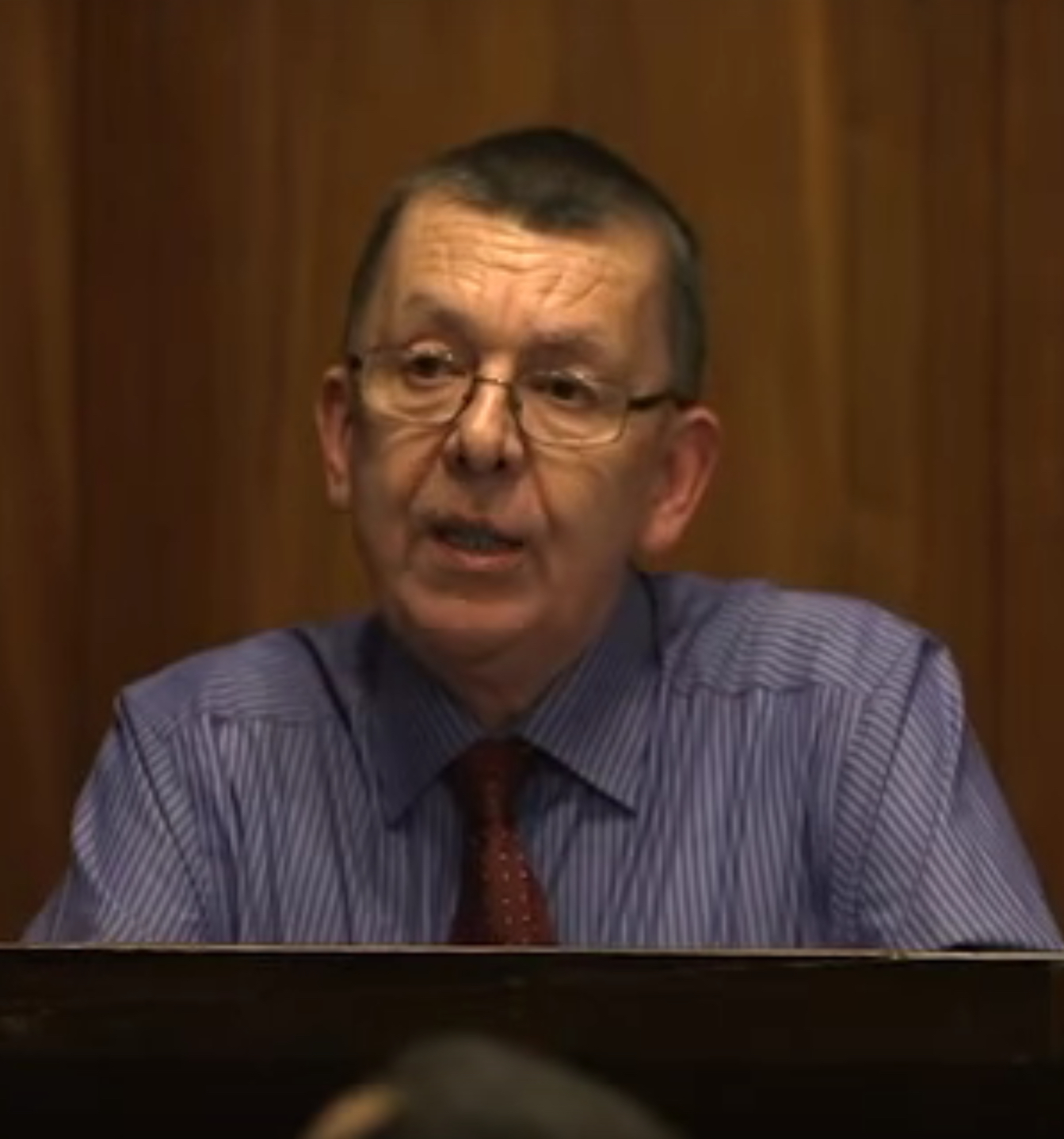
Brian Davies

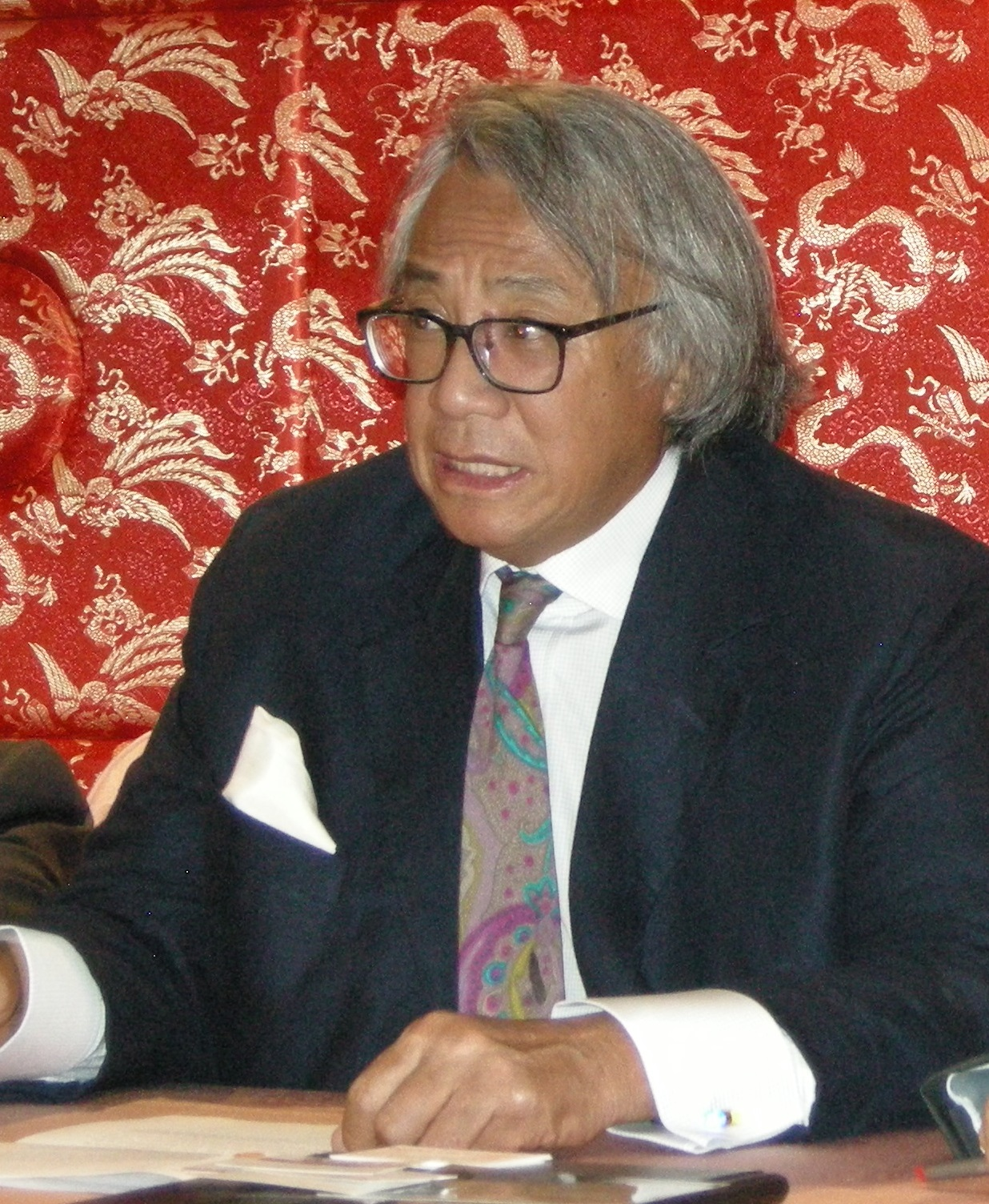
David Tang

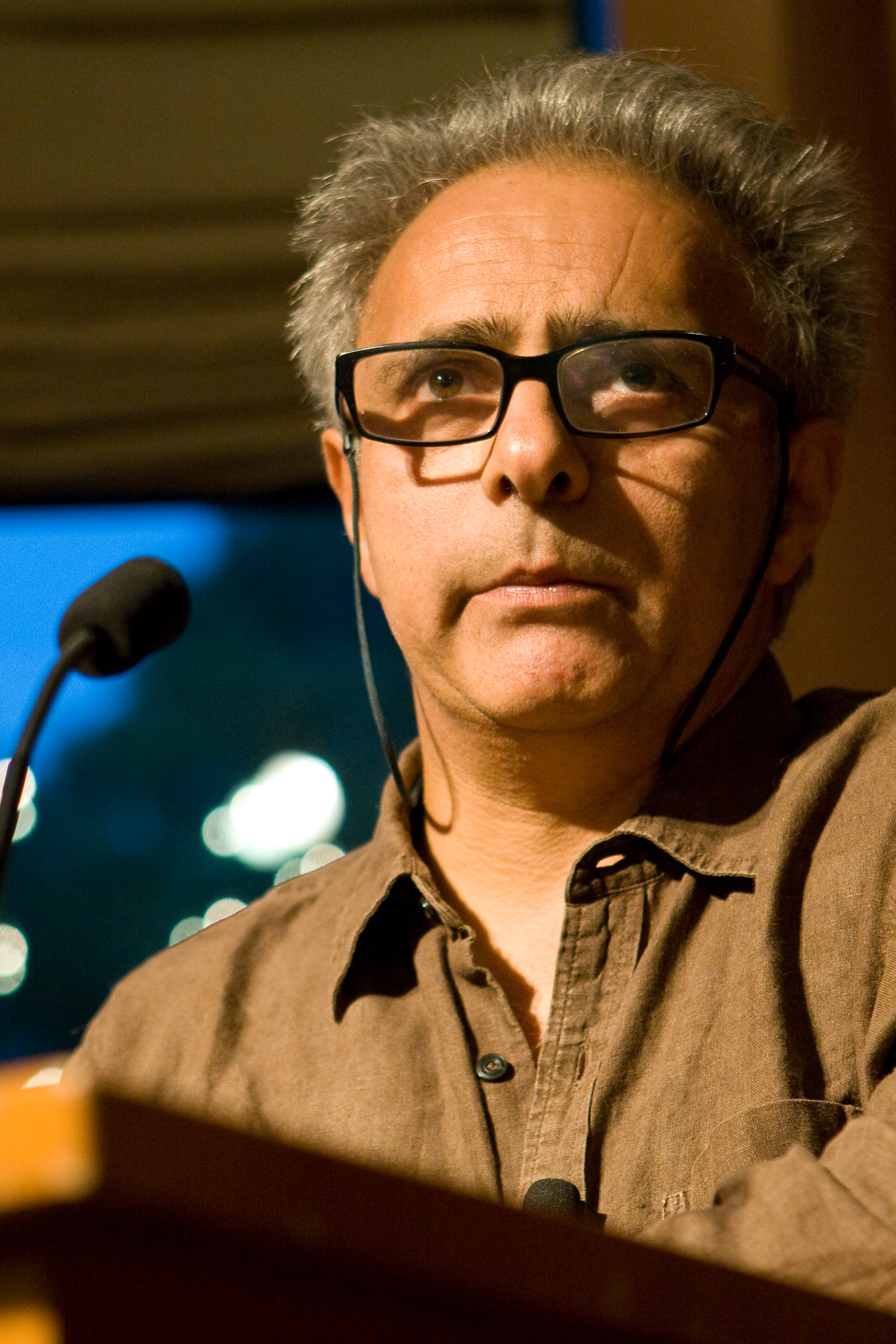
Hanif Kureishi

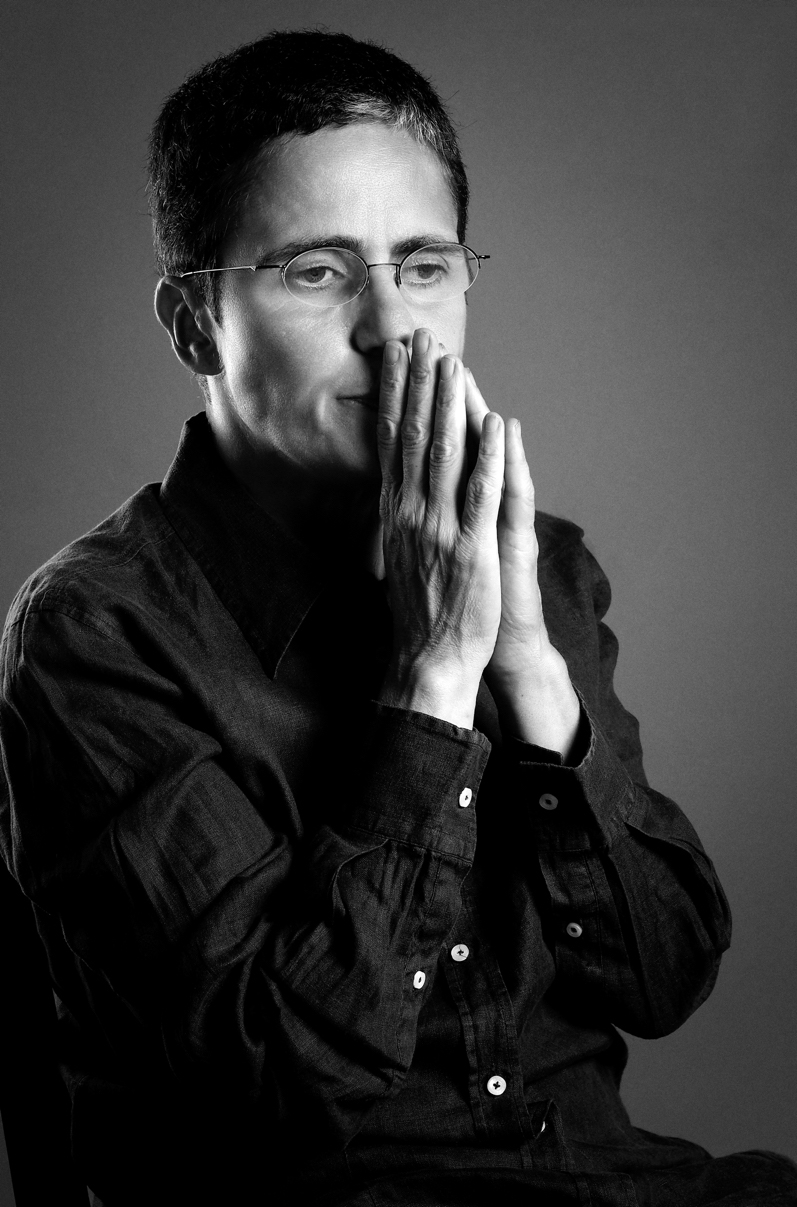
Nicla Vassallo

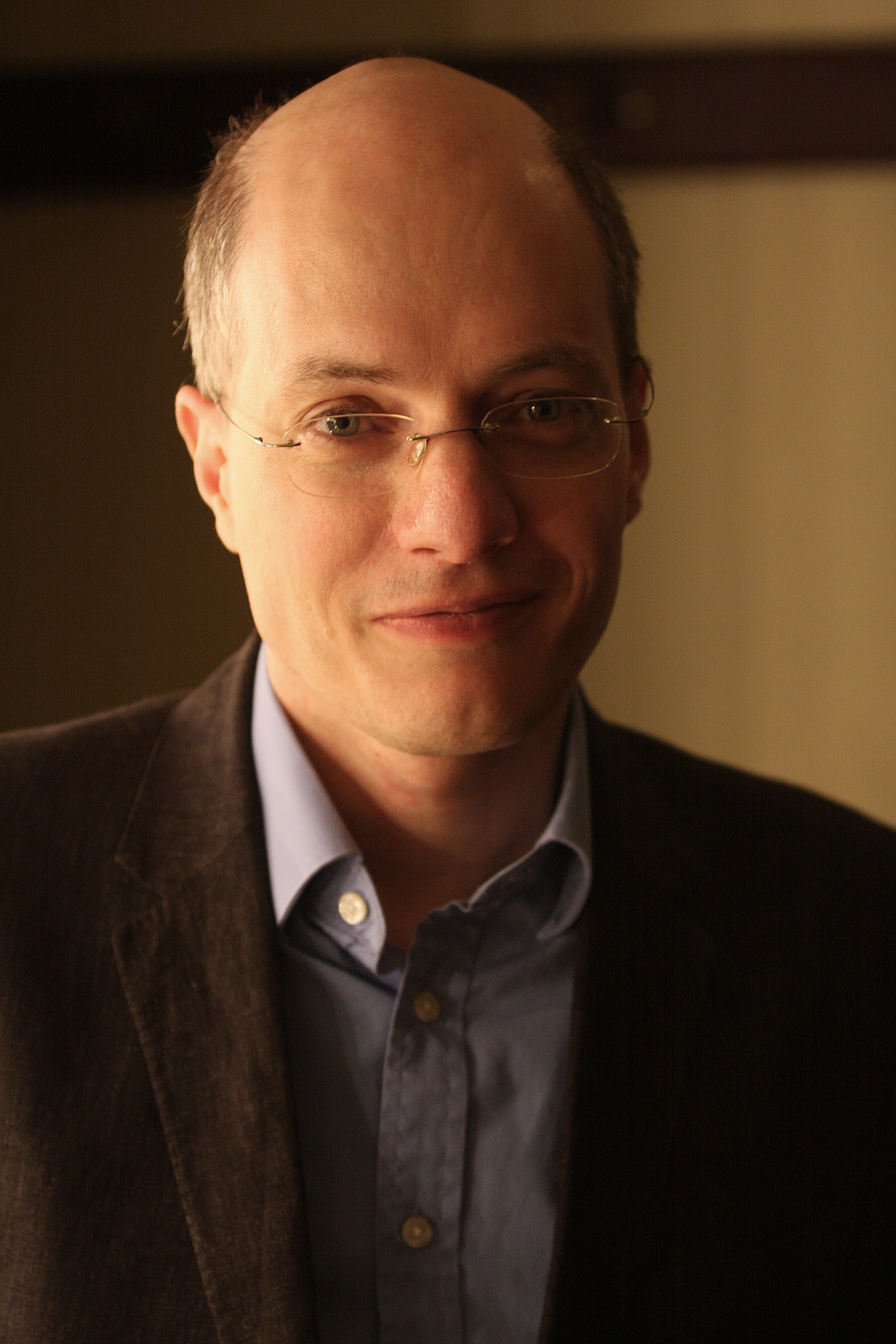
Alain de Botton

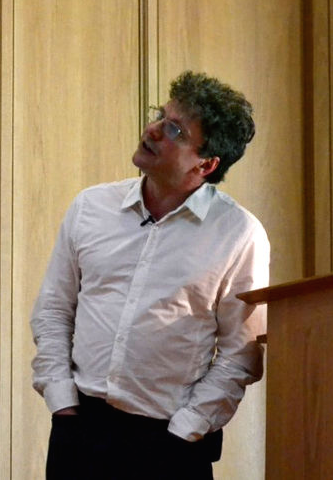
Simon Saunders

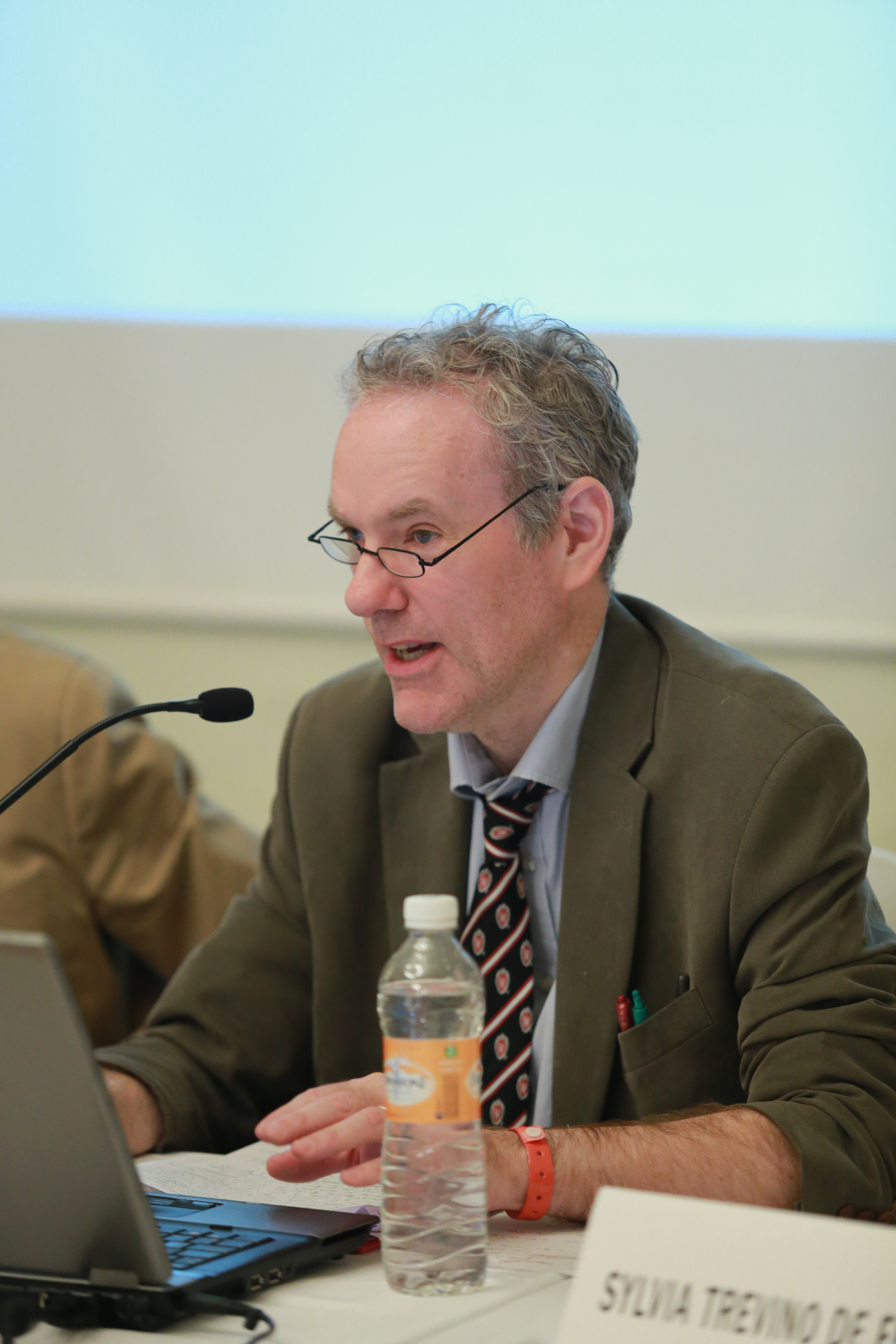
Harry Brighouse
- Peter Asher CBE, British musician, manager and record producer
- Brian Evan Anthony Davies OP, British academic and philosopher
- Sir David Tang KBE, Hong Kong journalist and businessperson
- Hanif Kureishi CBE, British playwright, screenwriter, filmmaker and novelist
- John Stammers, British writer and poet
- Sir Ralph Wedgwood, 4th Baronet, British philosopher
- Nicla Vassallo, Italian academic and philosopher
- Alain de Botton FRSL, Swiss-British author and philosopher
- Simon Saunders, British philosopher and physicist
- Harry Brighouse, British academic and philosopher
- Stefan Lorenz Sorgner, German academic and philosopher
- Tariq Goddard, British novelist and publisher
- Stathis Psillos, Greek academic and philosopher
- Helen Beebee, British academic and philosopher

== See also ==
- UCL Department of Philosophy
