= Norfolk Street, Strand =

Former street in the City of Westminster, London

Coordinates: 51°30′42.62″N 0°6′52.85″W

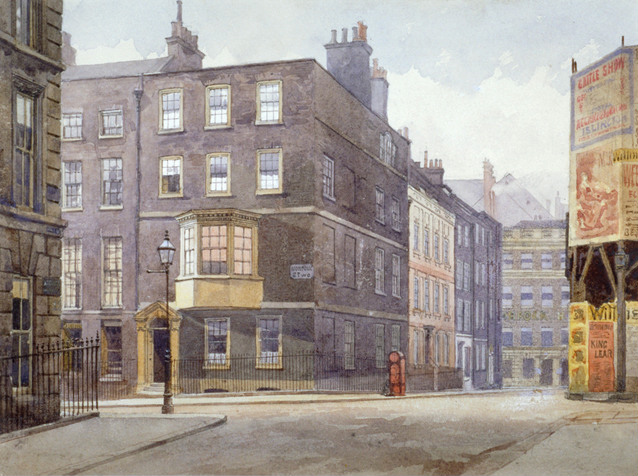
View of the Junction of Howard Street and Norfolk Street, London. John Crowther, watercolour, 1880.

Norfolk Street in the Liberty of the Savoy (between Westminster and the City of London) ran from Strand in the north to the Westminster reach of the Thames. It then ran to a strand of public gardens after the Victoria Embankment was built (1865–70), what is now Temple Place. It was crossed only by Howard Street. It was demolished in the 1970s.

== History ==
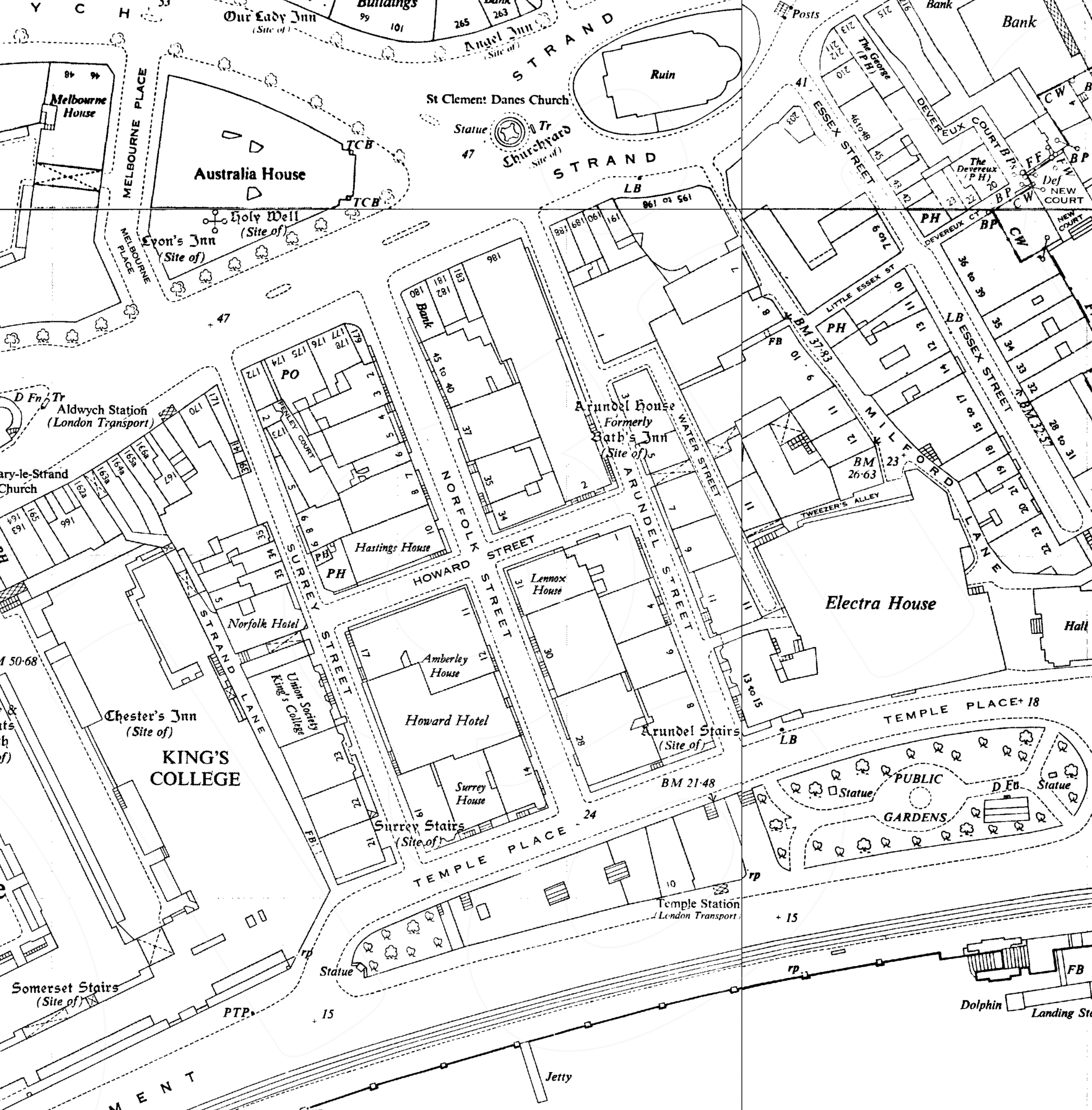
The vicinity of Norfolk Street (centre) on a 1950s Ordnance Survey map.

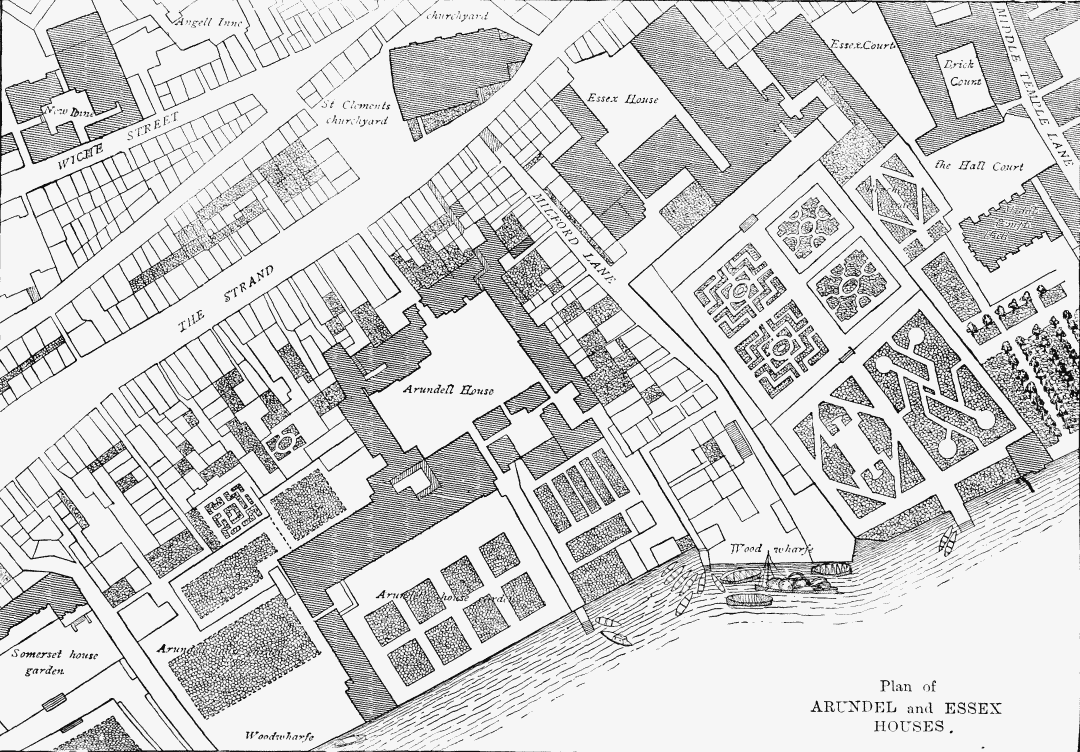
Map by Wenceslaus Hollar (c. 1670s) showing Arundel House.

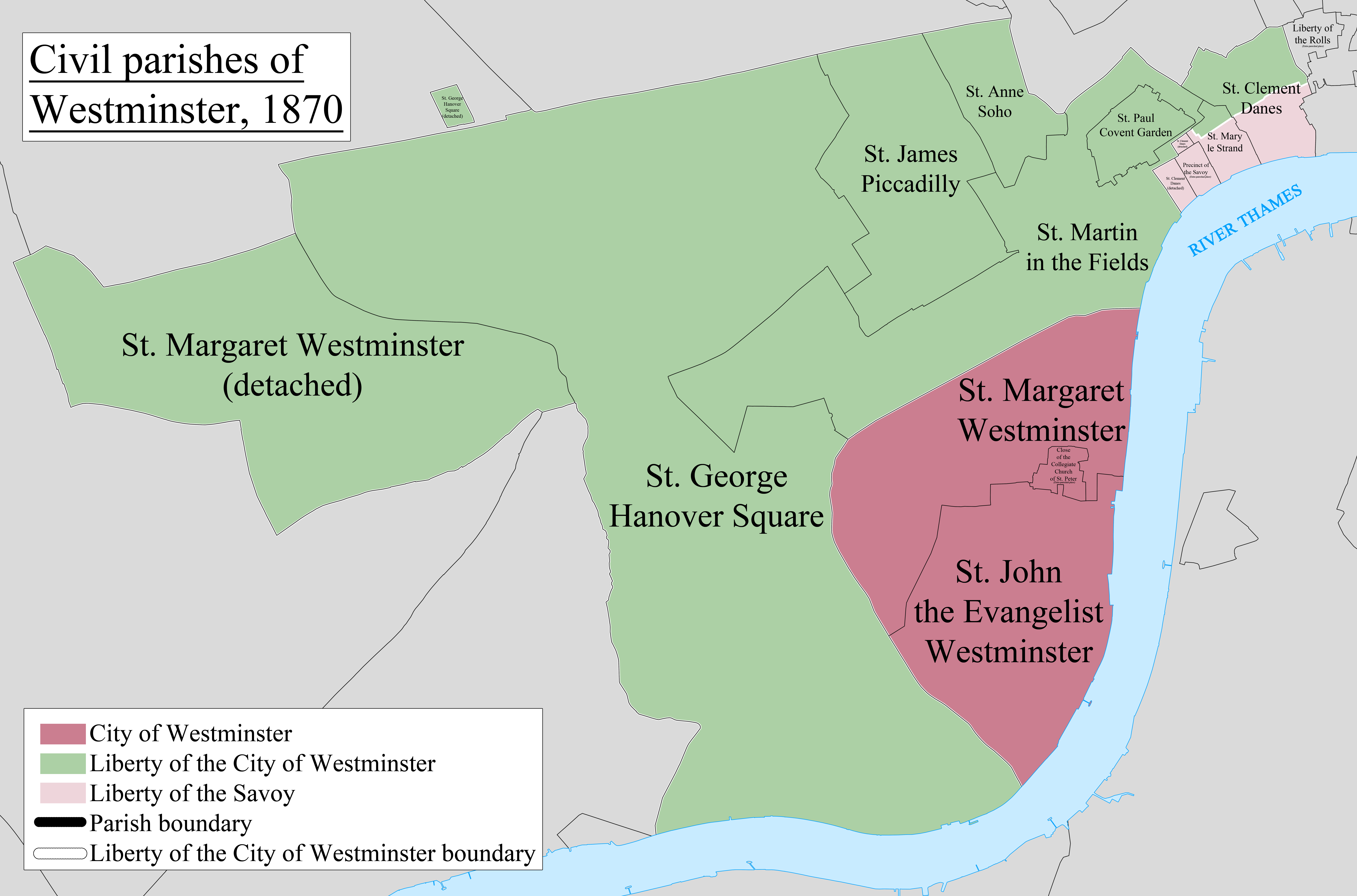
A map showing the Liberty of the Savoy in light pink in about 1870. Based on the Ordnance Survey Town Plan of London (1871-76) at 1:1056 scale. Click for broader map and to enable varied magnification.

The Street was built on land once occupied by Arundel House and its gardens, the property of the Howard family, Dukes of Norfolk; a dukedom (before which earldom) of medieval root. The head of the family plays a role in each coronation and each state opening of parliament. Off from its central crossroads are Arundel, Surrey and Howard Streets built after sprawling Arundel House was demolished by the earl of Arundel in 1678. Under Duke of Norfolk, Surrey and Arundel are subsidiary earldoms, plus Howard is used, the surname of the family.

A Norfolk Street tube station was planned in 1902, never built.

Norfolk Street and Howard Street were demolished in the 1970s to build Arundel Great Court, or Great Arundel Court, itself demolished in the mid 2010s – having been purchased in 2012.

== Buildings ==
The numbering scheme of latter decades is known.

№ 11 to 12: the south-west corner: Amberley House, office of the Ecclesiastical Association.

№ 10: Hastings House: hosted the Women Writers' Club from 1894. From here the early literary agent A. P. Watt (1834–1914) practised. By the 1900s the Middle Classes Defence Organization shared the building.

=== Oswaldestre House ===
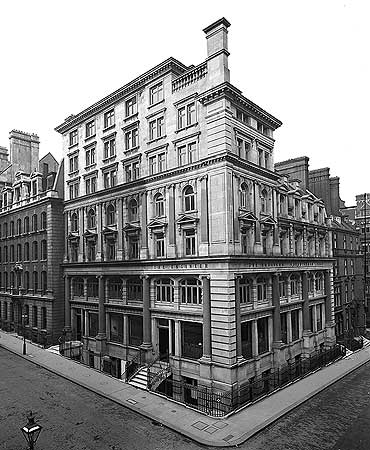
Oswaldestre House, 33–35 Norfolk Street in 1905.

№ 33 to 35: Oswaldestre House: was associated with engineering and radio technology. The name is a subsidiary title of the Dukes of Norfolk. The Engineer newspaper (est. 1856) was based there and the building was also the registered address of a large number of consulting engineers, such as Henry Metcalfe Hobart. The Western Electric Company had an early radio station (2WP) on the third floor of the building in 1922.

== Former inhabitants ==
Those having at least lived some time here include:

- Peter the Great, ruler of Russia in 1698.
- William Penn (born 1644), founder of Pennsylvania.
- Washington Irving, author, at № 35 in 1805.
- Percy Bysshe Shelley, poet, at № 13 and 32 in 1816.
- Samuel Taylor Coleridge, poet, at № 42 in 1816.
- Mary Mitford, bluestocking, at № 35 in the 1830s.
- Alfred Tennyson, poet, in 1842.
- Louisa Twining (born 1820), philanthropist.
