= Howard Street, London =

Former street in the City of Westminster, London

Coordinates: 51°30′42.88″N 0°6′52″W

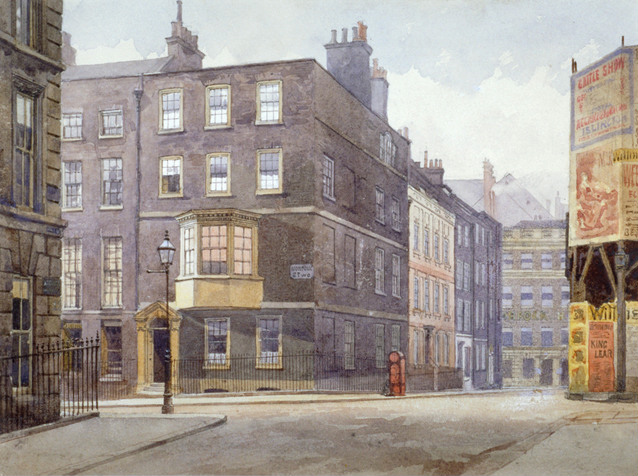
View of the Junction of Howard Street and Norfolk Street, London. John Crowther, watercolour, 1880.

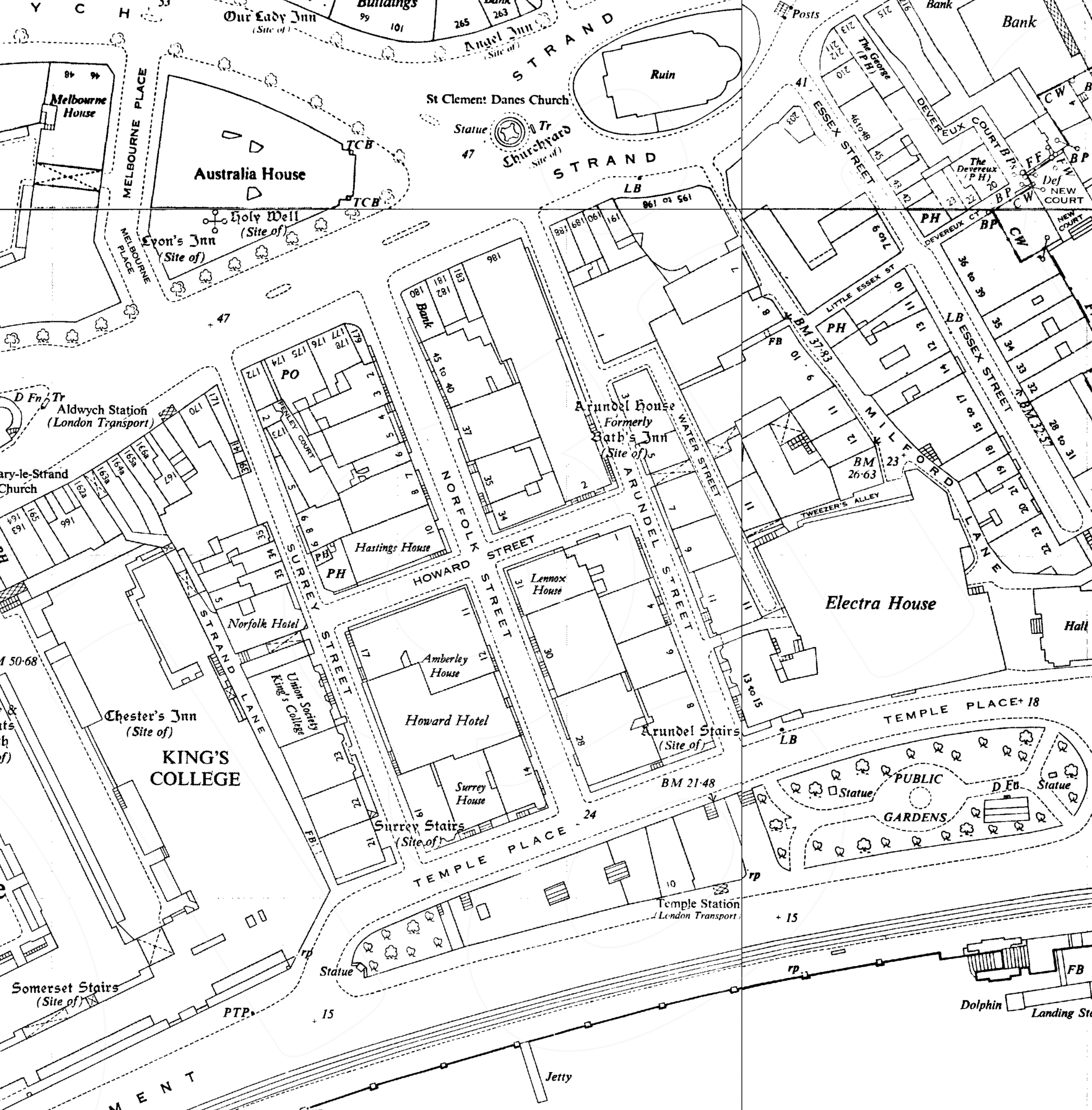
The vicinity of Howard Street (centre) on a 1950s Ordnance Survey map.

Howard Street was in the Liberty of the Savoy between Westminster and the City of London; it ran from Surrey Street in the west to Arundel Street in the east, and was crossed only by Norfolk Street. It was demolished in the 1970s.

== History ==
It was built on land once occupied by Arundel House and its gardens, the property of the Howard family, Dukes of Norfolk. Howard Street and its neighbouring streets, Arundel, Norfolk, and Surrey, were all built after Arundel House was demolished by the earl of Arundel in 1678.

Howard and Norfolk Streets were demolished in the 1970s to build Arundel Great Court – taken over by another building in 2012. A major replacement is a campus of King's College London.
