= Peter Sowerby Professor of Philosophy and Medicine =

The Peter Sowerby Professor of Philosophy and Medicine is an endowed chair at King's College London named after Peter Sowerby (physician and philanthropist). It was established in 2015 and is supported by the Peter Sowerby Foundation. The Chair leads the Philosophy and Medicine Project which is a joint venture between Department of Philosophy, the Faculty of Life Sciences and Medicine, and the Florence Nightingale Faculty of Nursing and Midwifery.

== Peter Sowerby Professors of Philosophy and Medicine ==
- Sherrilyn Roush (2015-2018)
- Alexander Bird (2018-2020)
- Elselijn Kingma (2020-)
