= Sherrilyn =

Sherrilyn is a feminine given name. Notable people with the name include:

- Sherrilyn Ifill (born 1962), American lawyer
- Sherrilyn Kenyon (born 1965), American novelist
- Sherrilyn Roush, American philosopher
