= Kingma =

Kingma is a surname of Frisian origin. It is derived from Kinge. Notable people with the surname include:

- Bruce Kingma (born 1961), American economist
- Elselijn Kingma, Dutch philosopher
- Michael Kingma (born 1979), Australian basketball player
- Nienke Kingma (born 1982), Dutch rower
- Vivian Kingma, (born 1994), Dutch cricketer
