= Roman Baths, Strand Lane =

17th-century water cistern in London, England

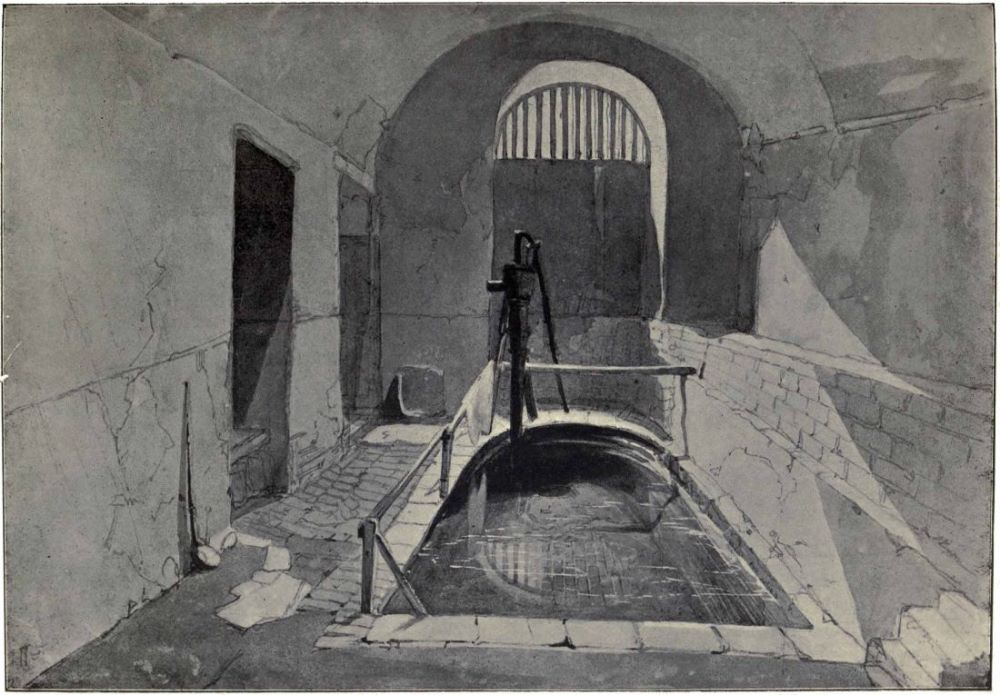
- Drawing of the Roman Baths on Strand Lane by John Wykeham Archer, 1841
- Interactive map of Roman Baths, Strand Lane
- 51.511587°N 0.115601°W
- Type: Plunge bath
- Location: 5 Strand Lane, London, England

Site notes
- Owner: National Trust
- Management: City of Westminster
- Public access: Restricted

The Strand Lane Baths, at 5 Strand Lane, London WC2R 2NA, have been reputed since the 1830s to be a Roman survival. They are in fact the remaining portion of a cistern built in 1612 to feed a fountain in the gardens of the old Somerset House, then a royal place. After a long period of neglect and decay, following the demolition of the fountain, they were brought back into use in the 1770s as a public cold plunge bath, attached to No. 33 Surrey Street. The idea that they were Roman probably began some fifty years later as an advertising gimmick, and has aroused both enthusiasm and scepticism ever since.

== Current dimensions and layout ==
The Bath building now consists of two elements: the bath chamber proper and a longer and narrower entrance corridor running alongside it, with steps up to a door out into Strand Lane. The bath chamber is covered by a full brick and/or stone vault, and measures 6.8 x 3.9 x 4m; it contains the bath (4.8 x 2.1 x 1.3m, with one square and one rounded end) and, at the eastern end, a settling tank built in the 1920s. The corridor is 9.1m long x 1.9m wide at its widest point, and is covered by a half-vault (2.8m high at its lower and 3.5m at its higher point). Access from corridor to bath chamber is via a doorway level with the midpoint of the bath; there is also a hatch just inside the entrance from Strand Lane. The floor of the corridor is 1.2m below the level of the Lane, and that of the bath chamber another 0.4m lower. The bath is made of shallow, wide Tudor bricks, measuring 235/240 x 115/120 x 40/47mm (Museum of London fabric 3033), with sides 400/480mm thick (= up to two bricks wide) and a floor of the same materials, broken and patched towards the western end; the edges have been patched with frogged bricks of post-1750 date. The brick-/stone-work of the walls and vaults has not been dated, but most probably belongs to the eighteenth century.

There are clear signs that these surviving elements were once part of a larger complex, the history of which will be explained below: there are blocked doorways at the ends of both the bath chamber and the entrance corridor, and a third in the south wall of the corridor, just inside the entrance from Strand Lane. Traces of older decorative schemes remain in the blue and white ‘Dutch’ tiles on the corridor wall and the door and hatch surrounds, and in the stone and marble slabs now resting on and around the settling tank; also in the damaged wall-plaque, identifying the bath as ‘nearly 2000 years old’ and a relic of the days of ‘Titus or Vespasian’.

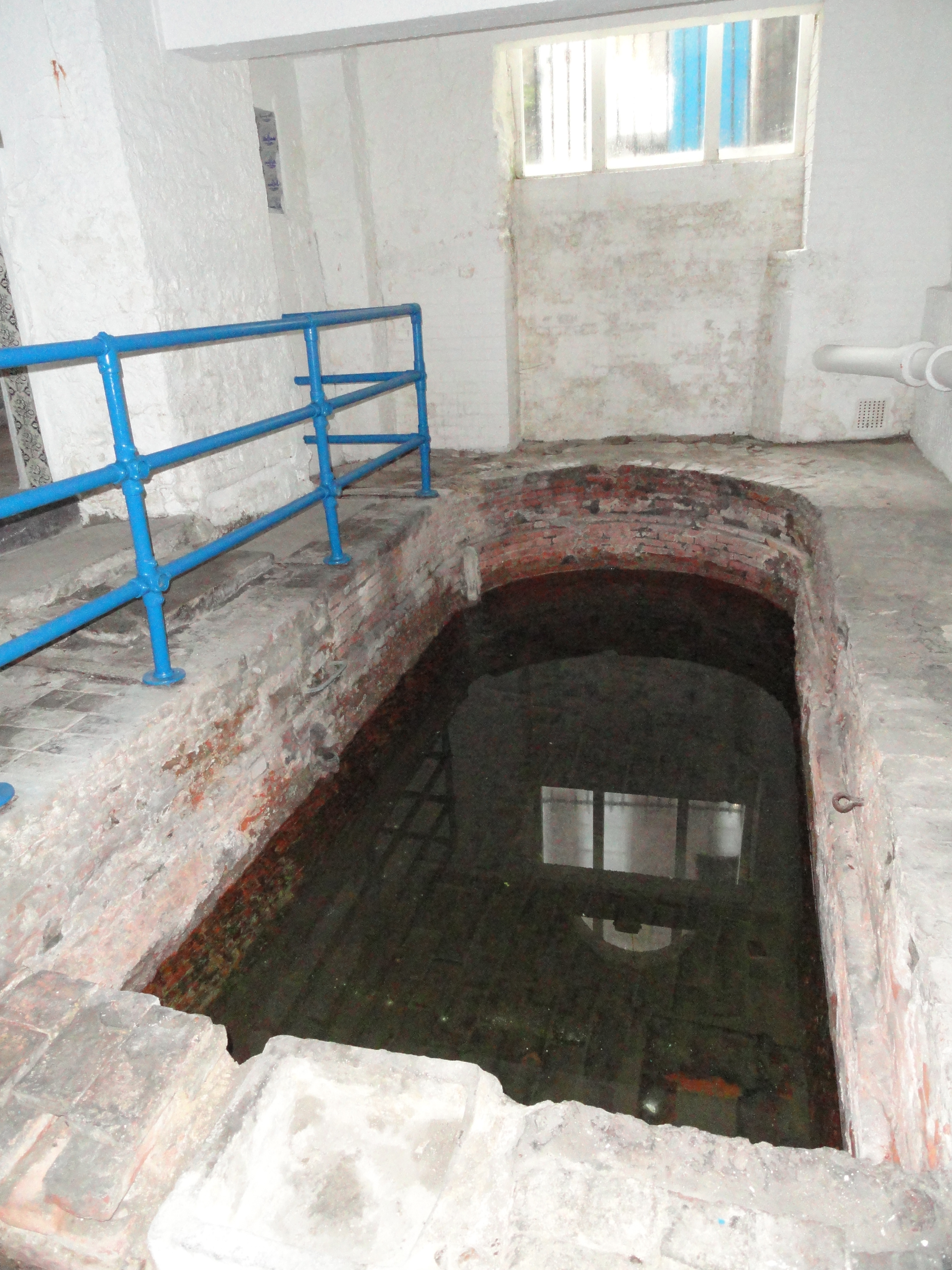
Photo of the interior of the bath chamber

== Water supply ==
The source of the water coming into the Bath has never been properly established, and may have varied over time. In the mid-nineteenth century it bubbled up through a hole in the floor, where patching to the brickwork can still be seen. In the early 1920s it entered at the north-east corner, but could also be seen seeping through the adjacent sides of the bath. Since the mid-1920s it has entered via the settling tank at the east end. The supply has been interrupted several times in the twentieth century, for instance in the 1940s when the bath was derelict and blocked, and again in the 1970s thanks to building work on Surrey Street. Talk in nineteenth- and twentieth-century sources of the holy well of Holywell Street, the holy well of St Clement, or underground streams descending from Highgate or Hampstead is speculative and unsubstantiated. When tested in 1981, samples were found to have ‘the basic characteristics of ground water, but containing high levels of nitrate and phosphate.’

== History ==
=== Anne of Denmark’s fountain and its cistern ===
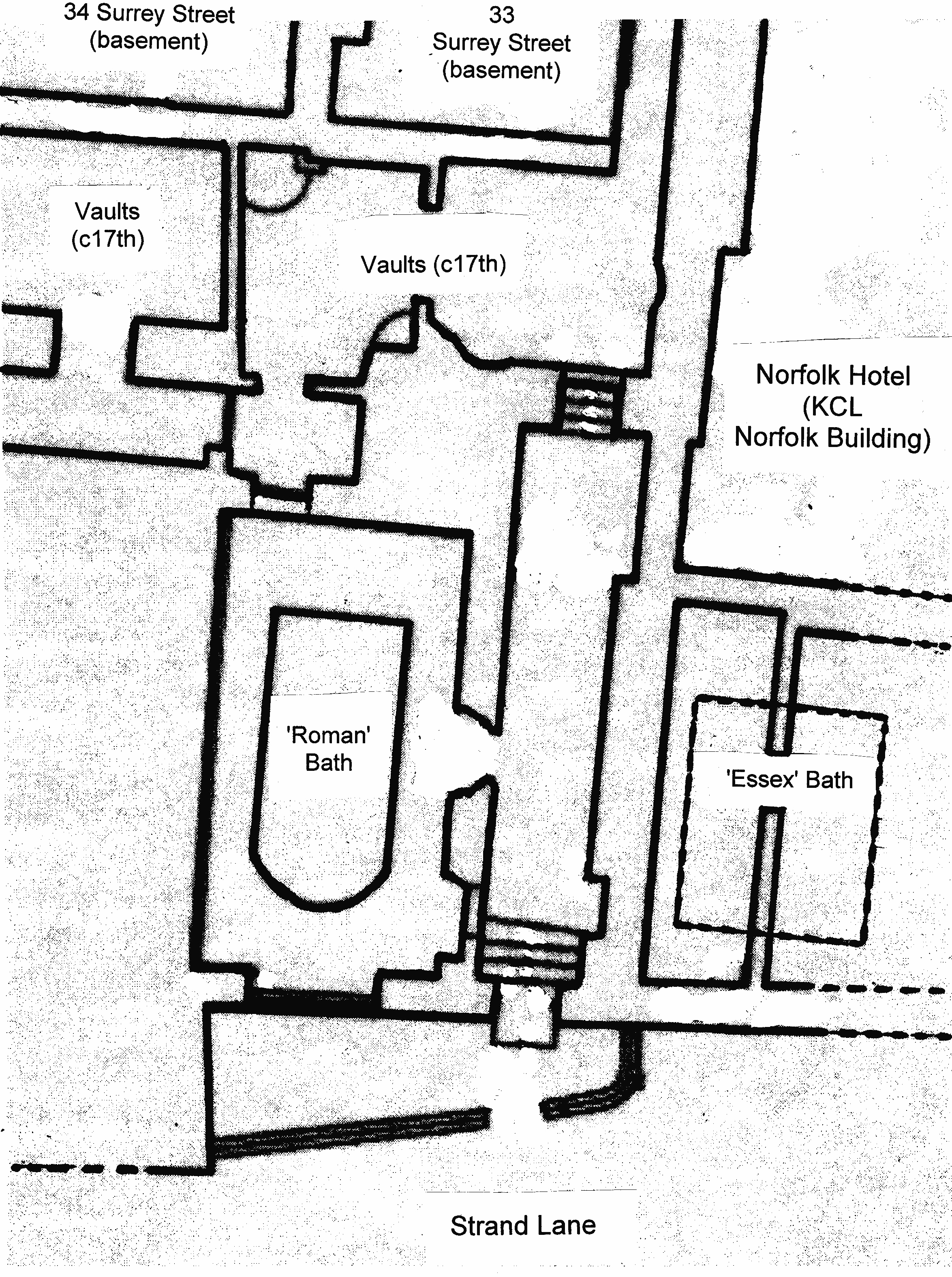
Plan of the Bath and its surroundings

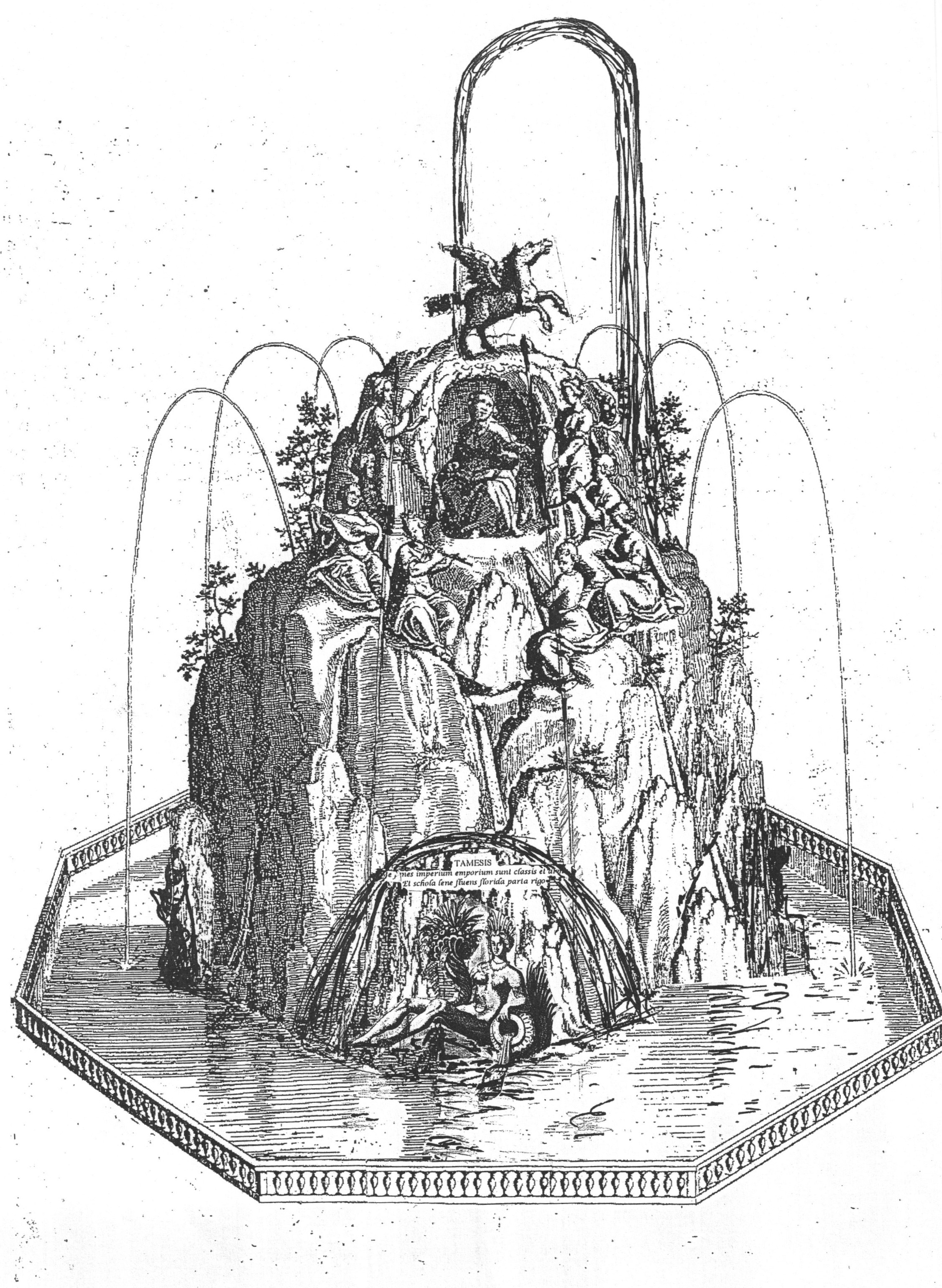
Anne of Denmark's fountain: an amateur reconstruction

In 1609–1613 James I had the first version of the old Somerset House lavishly enlarged and refurbished for his queen, Anne of Denmark. The refurbishment included the reorganization of the gardens and the building of an immense grotto-fountain showing the Muses and Pegasus on Mount Helicon, designed by the brilliant French engineer, Salomon de Caus. Contemporary documents establish that the cistern supplying this fountain was ‘over the Strand Lane’ and was fed by pump from the grounds of Somerset House. Further evidence from the early eighteenth century places the by-then derelict cistern-house level with what is now No 33 Surrey Street and next to the Old Watch House. It is thus clear that the Strand Lane Bath is exactly where the cistern-house is attested to have been. Expert dating of the brickwork of the bath to the range 1550–1650 then leaves it overwhelmingly probable that the ‘bath’ is in fact some part of the cistern structure. What part exactly is more mysterious: the full structure will have had to be considerably larger and taller than what now survives in order to power the fountain properly. It may be that the surviving fabric was part of the support for a water-tank (note the very thick sides) rather than a water-holder itself.

=== Georgian cold bath ===
The redevelopment of the remains of the derelict cistern structure as a cold bath seems to have been the work of a Mr James Smith, who moved into No 33 Surrey Street in the mid-1770s. By November 1776, he was advertising the opening of ‘the cold bath at No. 33, Surry-street, in the Strand … for the Reception of Ladies and Gentlemen, supplied with Water from a Spring, which continually runs through it.’ Two years later he enlarged his offering by adding a second, freshly constructed bath next to the first, lined with marble and surrounded by a stone-flagged floor and tiled walls. This is the so-called ‘Essex Bath’ which still survives, minus its cladding, under the floor of the back-basement of the Norfolk Hotel. Smith's enlargement also involved the provision of two entrances to the complex: for ladies in Surrey Street and for gentlemen in Strand Lane.

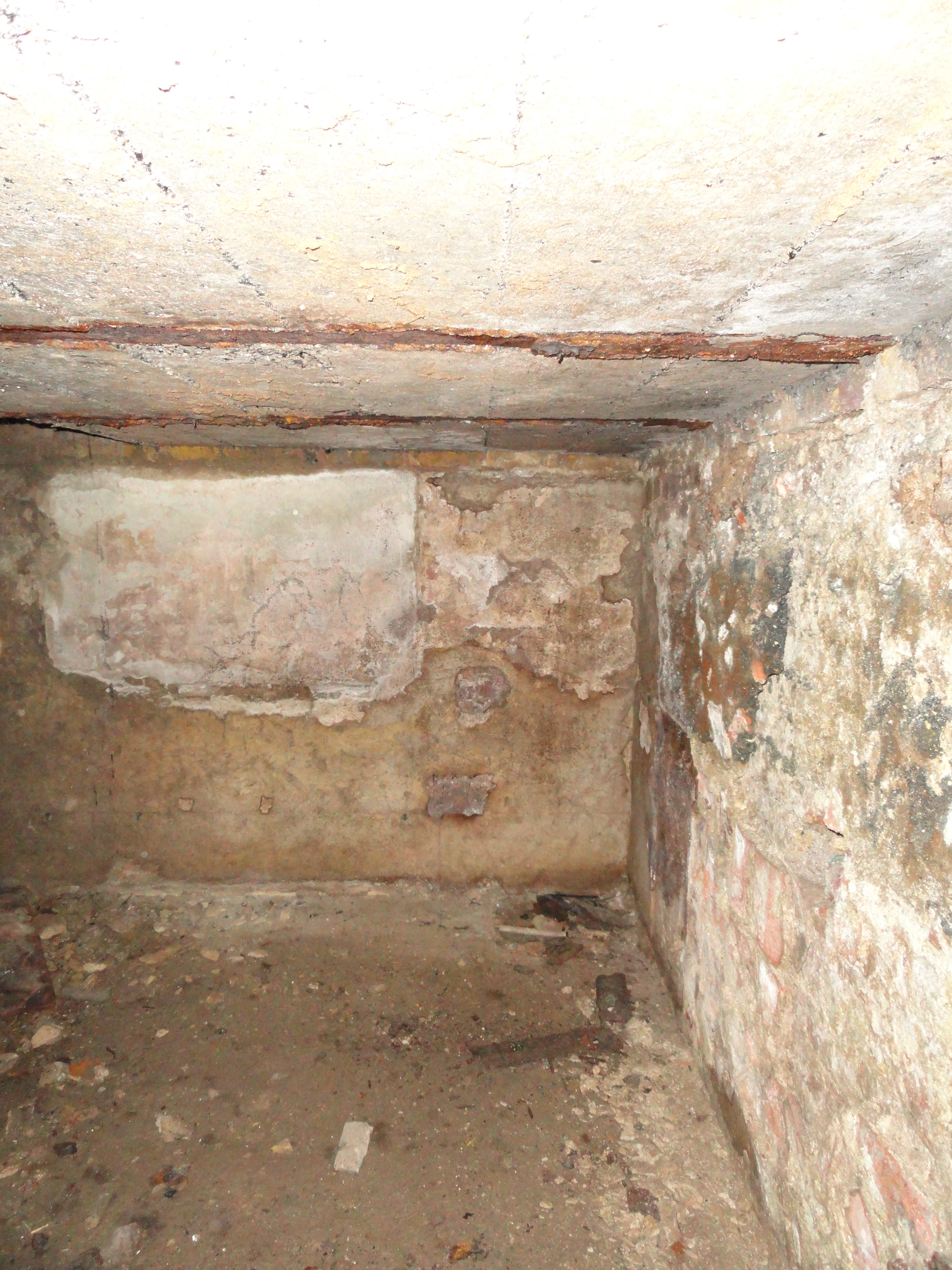
The second ('Essex') bath, in the basement of the Norfolk Hotel

Smith himself died in 1782, but his baths, still attached to No. 33 Surrey Street, continued to operate in the configuration he had given them for over a century. Their early history was colourful, largely thanks to the very mixed nature of the surrounding area. A newspaper report of 1777 has a would-be fare dodger, pursued by his angry cabbie, trying to hide in the bath, falling in, and having to be rescued from drowning. Others, from 1797, tell of a gang of fraudsters, operating from another house in Surrey Street, escaping through the Bath when raided by the police (the ‘Bow Street Light Infantry’). Most spectacularly of all, the MP and collector of ancient sculpture, William Weddell, died of a seizure in the bath on a hot day in the spring of 1792 (though it is not clear whether it was in the ‘Roman’ or the ‘Essex’ bath that this happened).

=== Becoming Roman ===
As time went on, with various changes of ownership, arrangements altered in some significant ways. The complex came to be run not from 33 Surrey Street but from No. 5 Strand Lane—which at this time was the now demolished building over the ‘Essex’ bath, not the present No. 5—and bathing came to be confined to the newer and better appointed of the two basins, with the other one being used as a reservoir to feed it, and for domestic purposes. It seems also that the Bath had begun to lose its attractiveness to potential patrons, and it was this that was probably responsible for its conversion into an alleged Roman relic. At any rate, it is in 1838, without any prior warning, that the establishment suddenly appears in a trade directory as the ‘Old Roman Spring Baths’, under the proprietorship of a Mr Charles Scott. Within barely more than a decade, the story of Roman origins had been taken up and publicised in two highly influential publications: vol. II of Charles Knight’s historical guidebook London (1842) and chs. 35 and 36 of Charles Dickens’s David Copperfield. From there (and particularly from Knight) it found its way into an enormous range of guidebooks, popular antiquarian writing, journals and newspapers, in such a way that, although sceptical voices were occasionally raised, it became the general orthodoxy for the rest of the nineteenth century and well into the twentieth.

Bathing continued in the newer of the two basins, but increasingly visitors came out of antiquarian curiosity, seeking out this supposed survivor of ancient Roman times in its romantically out-of-the way corner off the bustling Strand, with the extra attraction of being able to see where Copperfield and presumably his creator Dickens too had bathed. The appearance of the Bath in 1841 can be seen in the engraving accompanying Knight’s chapter, and the watercolour from which it was made, now in the British Museum; its setting in the 1880s is captured in a photograph in the Look & Learn Historical Library and an engraving in Percy Fitzgerald’s Picturesque London.

=== Henry Glave and 1893 ===
In 1893 the whole complex was bought outright by one of its few remaining users, the New Oxford Street draper, Henry Glave. Glave then proceeded to sell off the newer, ‘Essex’ bath, along with the building over it, the old No. 5 Strand Lane, to the proprietors of the Norfolk Hotel, which was then expanding backwards from Surrey Street to the Lane. At the same time, Glave refurbished the older basin for bathing by transferring the stone flooring, marble lining and wall tiles to it from its now decommissioned neighbour, along with some new partitioning, changing-stalls and decorative sculpture. The results, almost completely concealing the old brickwork, can be seen in photographs now in the London Metropolitan Archive and the Look & Learn History Picture Library. It was as part of the same process that the doorway from the corridor to the bath, originally positioned next to the entrance from the Strand, was relocated to half-way down the corridor and replaced by the present hatchway.

Copies of the information leaflet issued to advertise the refurbished Bath, as both a Roman relic and the last of central London's traditional cold baths, can be found in the Westminster Archives. Glave, followed by his son Nolan and his daughters Blanche and Florence, continued to run the establishment as a combination of a subscribers club and a visitor attraction for another several decades until in 1922, as part of a larger reorganization of the family business, Blanche offered it for sale.

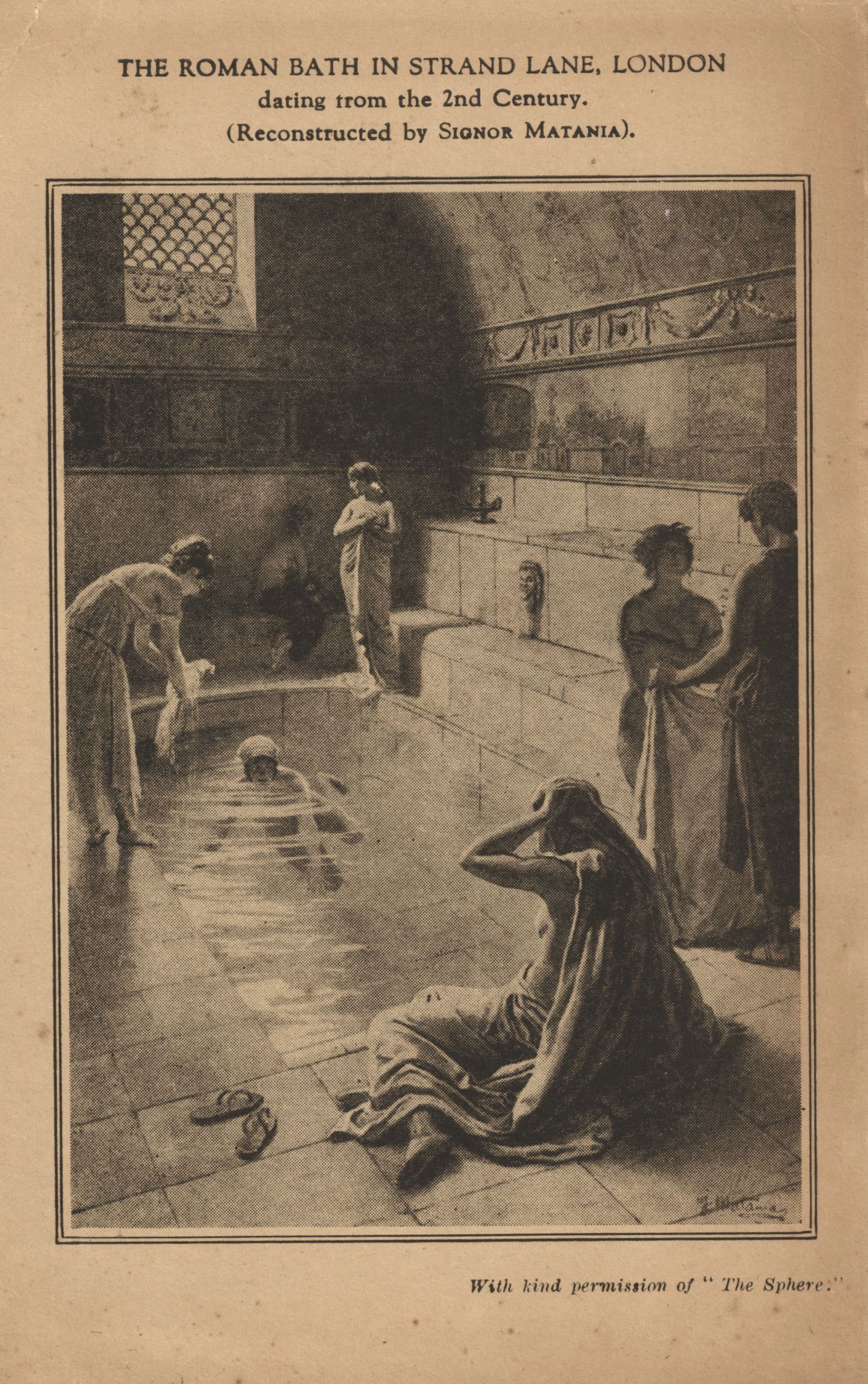
The Bath as 'reconstructed' by Fortunino Matania in the 1920s: Tuck postcard, 'St Clement Danes Series'

=== William Pennington Bickford ===
The Bath was bought, for £500, by the Rector of St Clement Danes, the Reverend William Pennington Bickford, who, along with his allies the journalist and historical writer Edward Foord and the graphic artist Fortunino Matania, was the last of the great believers in its Roman origins. Aiming to get back to the ‘real’ Roman fabric, he had all of the Glave décor apart from the tiling stripped off (some of it is still there on top of the settling tank), and dreamed of restoring the Bath to its original magnificence – ironically, by once again covering it in marble and stucco, this time of the ‘right’ kind. The vision is preserved in a drawing by Matania for the journal The Sphere, of which the original is now in the Wellcome Library iconographic collection. Pennington Bickford's ambition was for the Bath to become one of London's most attractive historic monuments, and to bring both cultural cachet and much needed funds to St Clement Danes and its parish. Edward Foord, for his part, produced a series of pamphlets and newspaper articles arguing confidently for the Bath's Roman credentials and offering speculative reconstructions of its history, layout and workings.

=== From Pennington Bickford to the National Trust ===
Pennington Bickford's plans came to nothing for want of funds, and when he and his wife died in 1941, the Bath was bequeathed to the patron of St Clement Danes, William Cecil, 5th Marquess of Exeter, along with what they hoped would be the means of securing its preservation as a historic monument. Complications over Mrs Pennington Bickford's will, however, combined with the disruptions of the war years, meant that it was only in late 1944 that discussions began between Westminster Council, the Ministry of Works, the London County Council (LCC) and the National Trust about taking the now derelict Bath into public or charitable ownership. Eventually, the Trust agreed to take it on, on condition that someone else came up with the purchase price and undertook the day-to-day maintenance. The London County Council agreed to see to the maintenance, and the money was provided by another of the Bath's fans, the timber magnate Montague L. Meyer. The Trust formally took possession of the Bath in November 1947, and after the necessary repairs and redecoration, opened them to the public in June 1951.

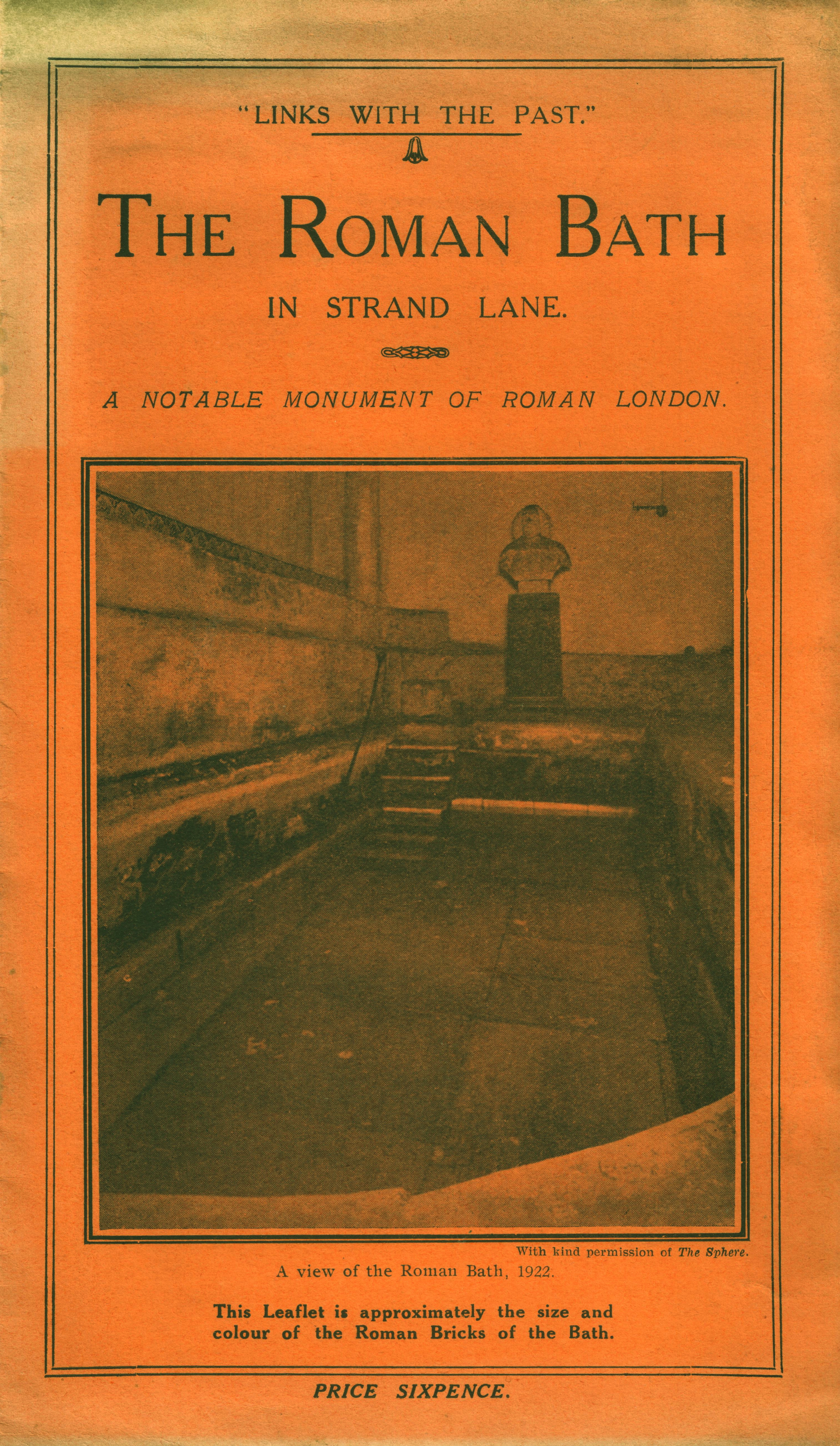
The cover of one of Edward Foord's guidebooks to the Bath from the 1920s

As part of the same process, the LCC Architect's Office undertook a historical investigation into the Bath's origins, largely under the supervision of F.J. Collins of its Historic Buildings Section. Collins took evidence from a wide range of sources, including a surviving daughter of the last proprietor before Henry Glave, the now elderly and cantankerous historical writer Edward Foord, and most significantly of all a penetrating analysis of the Roman story compiled in 1906 by an anonymous predecessor at the LCC. The conclusion of the investigation was that the Bath was almost certainly not Roman, but was worth preservation as a historical curiosity all the same; in place of Roman origins a connection with Arundel House and with Thomas Howard, the collector of the Arundel Marbles, was tentatively suggested. These conclusions were written up for the new information leaflet for the Bath published by the LCC to coincide with its opening to the public in 1951, and are still to be seen on the information board outside the Bath in Strand Lane. It is only now that they can be superseded.

=== Present condition and future prospects ===
Sixty-five years later, the Bath once more languishes in relative neglect. It has recently been redecorated but remains difficult to visit. A call to the number on the noticeboard outside will, with luck, get an appointment to visit. It can be seen annually over Open House weekend, or weekly as part of the Somerset House Old Palaces Tour. Otherwise, it can be viewed, dimly, through the window on Strand Lane; but the window is often fogged up and the time-switch for the internal lighting often out of order. Other parts of the larger, eighteenth- and nineteenth-century layout still survive, in buildings currently owned by King's College London (the ‘Essex’ Bath in the Norfolk Hotel basement; 33 Surrey Street and its cellar); although a plan to sell this part of the King's campus has now been shelved, prospects for its refurbishment are still uncertain. A recent project sponsored by the Cultural Institute at King's has indicated some interesting ways in which digital resources could be used to explore the Bath's history and make it accessible to virtual visitors, but lacks further funding.

== See also ==
- Roman house at Billingsgate, an actual Roman bath in London

== Bibliography ==
- H. M. Colvin (ed.), History of the King’s Works, Vol. 4, London, HMSO, 1982
- K. Hayward, Building material Report – Strand Lane 'Roman' 'bath': the results from the sampling and analysis of the building material from the bath and associated structures, London Borough of Westminster, Pre-Construct Archaeology Report No. R11125, November 2011
- Luke Morgan, Nature as Model: Salomon de Caus and Early Seventeenth-century Landscape Design, Philadelphia: University of Pennsylvania Press, 2007, ISBN 978-0-8122-3963-8
- Roy C. Strong, The Renaissance Garden in England, London: Thames & Hudson, 1979, ISBN 9780500272145
- Michael Trapp, 'The Denmark House Helicon: iconography and surviving traces', Studies in the History of Gardens and Designed Landscapes vol. 32, 2012, p. 241–57
- Michael Trapp, 'The Georgian history of the Strand Lane 'Roman' bath', The London Journal vol. 39, 2014, p. 142–67
- Michael Trapp, 'A "fine specimen of Neronian brickwork" in Victorian London: how the Strand Lane cold bath became Roman', International Journal of the Classical Tradition, December 2016 – open access
