= Rob Goffee =

British academic

- Education: University of Kent
- Occupation: Academic

Rob Goffee is a British academic. He is an Emeritus Professor of Organisational Behaviour and former Deputy Dean at the London Business School. He is the author or co-author of eleven books, including Why should anyone be led by you? (co-authored with Gareth Jones), which became a bestseller.

== Bibliography ==
- Goffee, Rob; Jones, Gareth; Steare, Roger (19 March 2018). "What would a moral organisation look like?". Management Today.
