= Simon Saunders =

Philosopher of physics

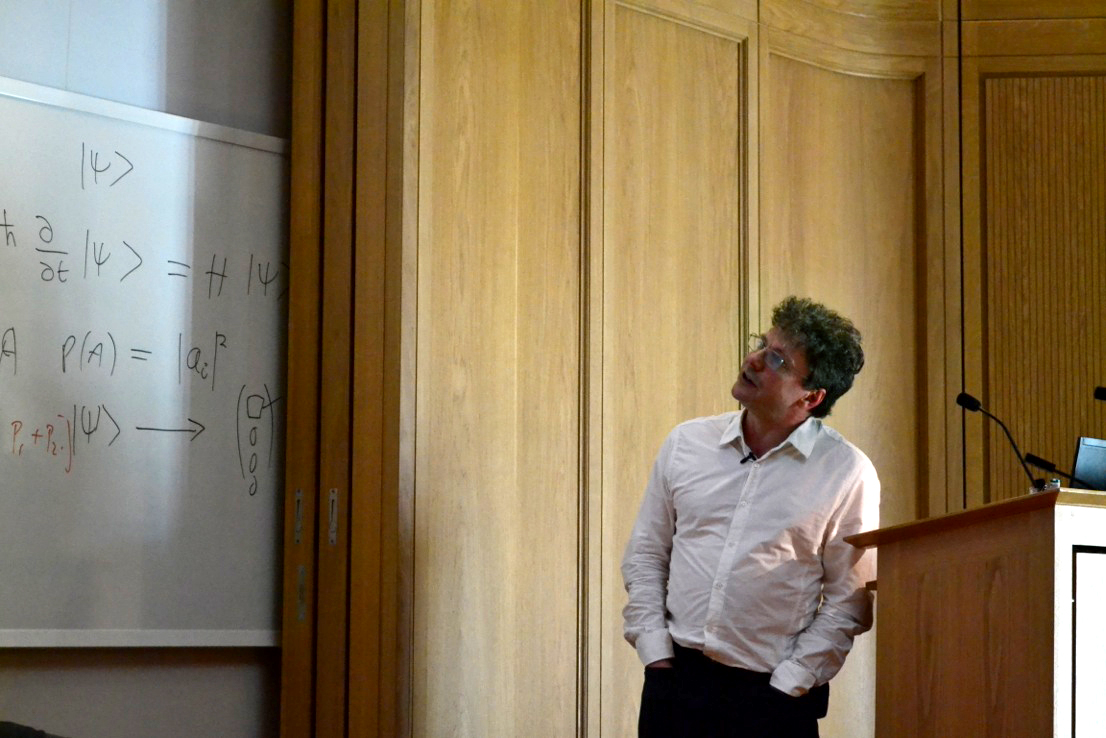
- Professor Saunders at the 1st Ockham Debate, held at the T.S.Eliot Lecture Theatre, Merton College, on 13 May 2013
- Born: 30 August 1954 (age 72); London

Education
- Education: University of Oxford; Christ's College, Cambridge; King's College, London
- Thesis: Mathematical and Philosophical Foundations of Quantum Field Theory (1989)
- Doctoral advisor: Michael Redhead

Philosophical work
- Era: Contemporary philosophy
- Region: Western philosophy
- School: Analytic philosophy
- Institutions: University of Oxford
- Doctoral students: include Sherrilyn Roush
- Main interests: Philosophy of physics, philosophy of science

Simon Wolfe Saunders (born 30 August 1954) is a British philosopher of physics. He is noted for his work on quantum mechanics (particularly the many-worlds interpretation), on identity and indiscernibility in physics, and on structural realism.

Saunders is currently Professor of Philosophy of Physics at the University of Oxford, and Fellow of Merton College, having moved to Oxford in 1996. He has previously held untenured posts at Harvard University (1990–1996), and temporary or visiting positions at Wolfson College, Oxford (1985–89), the Hebrew University of Jerusalem (1989–1990), Harvard (2001), École Polytechnique (2004), University of British Columbia (2005), Perimeter Institute (2005), and IMéRA (L’Institut Méditerranéen de Recherches Avancées) (2010). He is married to Kalypso Nicolaïdis; they have two children.

== Education ==
Saunders was an early graduate of the Physics and Philosophy undergraduate degree at the University of Oxford. He then studied the part III Mathematics Tripos at Christ's College, Cambridge under Martin Rees, John Polkinghorne, and Peter Goddard, and completed his PhD at King's College, London in 1989 under the supervision of Michael Redhead. His thesis title was ‘Mathematical and Philosophical Foundations of Quantum Field Theory’.

== Contributions to philosophy ==
Saunders was an early champion of 'structural realism', the view that mature physical theories correctly describe the structure of reality. Structural realism is today regarded by many philosophers as the most defensible form of realism.

He was also amongst the first to draw attention to the consequences of decoherence for the many-worlds interpretation (MWI) of quantum mechanics; he defended a decoherence-based version of MWI in a series of articles throughout the 1990s.

More recently, Saunders has worked extensively on the interpretation of probability in quantum mechanics. Along with David Deutsch and David Wallace, he has developed techniques for deriving the Born Rule, which relates quantum amplitudes to objective probabilities. He has applied these arguments to operational approaches to quantum mechanics as well as to MWI. In 2021 Saunders produced a branch counting derivation of the Born Rule.

Saunders has also been a central figure in recent debates over identity and indiscernibility in physics. He was the first to apply the Hilbert-Bernays definition of identity in formal first-order languages to physical theories, both spacetime theories and quantum mechanics, going on to show that elementary fermions and composite bosons in quantum theory satisfied the principle of identity of indiscernibles, using the Hilbert-Bernays definition of identity.

In related work, he has argued that classical particles could be treated as indistinguishable in exactly the same way that quantum particles (and that departures from classical statistics can be traced to discrete nature of the measure—dimensionality—of subspace of Hilbert space), and applied this to the Gibbs paradox.

Saunders has also developed a general framework for the treatment of symmetries whereby all symmetries, not only gauge symmetries, as applied to strictly closed systems, yield only redescriptions of the same physical state of affairs. In a slogan: 'only invariant properties and relations are physically real'.

In addition, Saunders has worked on quantum field theory, on the philosophy of time, and on the history of physics; he has written numerous encyclopaedia articles and book reviews.

== Publications ==
=== Books ===
- Many Worlds?: Everett, quantum theory, and reality, S. Saunders, J. Barrett, A. Kent, and D. Wallace (eds), Oxford: Oxford University Press. 2010. ISBN 978-0199655502
- The Philosophy of Vacuum, S. Saunders and H. Brown (eds.), Clarendon Press, Oxford 1991. ISBN 978-0198244493
