= Roger Steare =

British ethicist, corporate philosopher

Professor Roger Steare FRSA
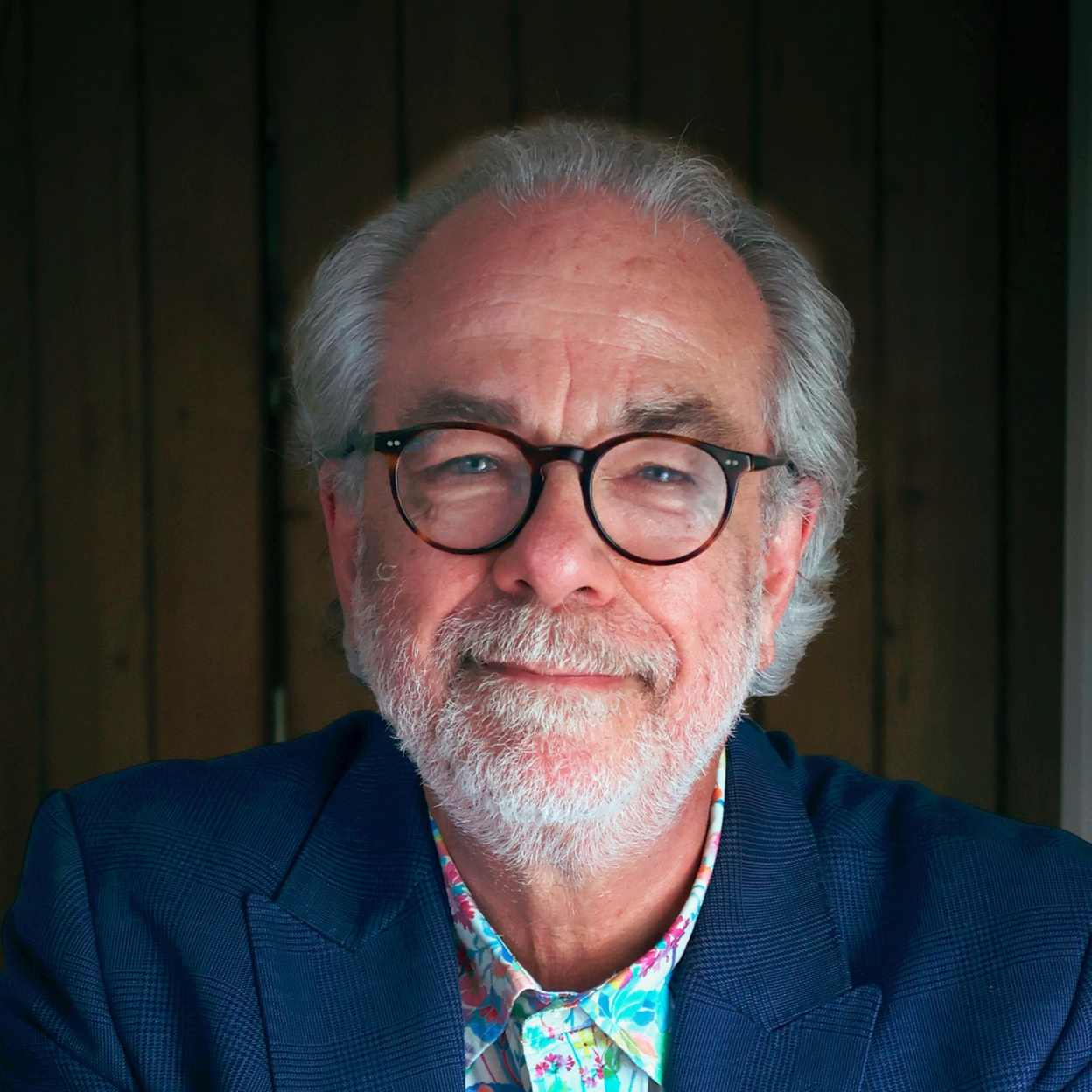
- Born: Brighton, Sussex, England
- Education: Bedford College, University of London
- Occupations: Consultant; Speaker; Author
- Steare's voice recorded July 2016
- Website: thecorporatephilosopher.org

Roger Steare is a British ethicist and corporate philosopher. He has been an Honorary Visiting Professor and Corporate Philosopher in Residence at the Cass Business School, and Visiting Professor of European Studies at the College of Europe. He is the author of books on corporate ethics and a columnist for the Financial Times, also working at the FT's Headspring Executive Development.

== Career ==
Steare's early career included roles as a social worker and banker, and ten years as chief executive of a recruitment company.

He was Honorary Visiting Professor of Organisational Ethics, and Corporate Philosopher in Residence at the Cass Business School in London. He taught on the Executive MBA Programs as well as consulting with external corporate clients through Cass Executive Education.

He is also a fellow of the cross-party policy think tank, ResPublica founded by Phillip Blond in 2009. Steare's essay on The Power of Love in Business was included in ResPublica's "Changing The Debate: The Ideas Redefining Britain".

Steare was a member of the Expert Drafting Committee for Rights and Humanity, invited by the British Government to prepare recommendations for the G20 London Summit in April 2009.

In collaboration with Athens-based chartered psychologist Pavlos Stamboulides, Steare conducts empirical research on moral character, judgement and behaviour. Some of this research was published in The Times in October 2010, in a speech by Hector Sants of the Financial Services Authority in 2010, by PwC UK in 2010, and in The challenges of risk, culture, behaviour and corporate integrity in financial services for EY in 2017. He is co-designer of the psychometric profile MoralDNA, used to measure moral values.

Steare is the author of Ethicability, first published in 2006 and now in its 5th edition, and of Thinking Outside the Inbox, published in 2019. He is a regular contributor to Chartered Banker magazine in which he challenges the "dysfunctional totalitarian construct" of modern corporations, In July 2020, he became a columnist for the Financial Times.

On 22 July 2012, he was a guest on the BBC World Service's "In the Balance" programme, in an episode entitled Holding Companies to Account.

In 2014, Steare was appointed Visiting Professor of European Studies at the College of Europe, Bruges. He is a Fellow of the Royal Society of Arts.

Steare has developed programs in leadership, ethics and corporate responsibility for organisations including BP, Citigroup, HSBC, PwC, the Financial Services Authority and the Serious Fraud Office.

Following the Deepwater Horizon oil spill in 2010, BP incorporated Steare's ethicability RIGHT framework for ethical decision-making into the BP 2011 Code of Conduct.

The Financial Times profiled Steare in 2012 and has more than once cited his definition of corporate culture as "the way human beings behave together — what they value and what they celebrate". In March 2018, Steare was featured in The Guardian in an article profiling the role of philosophers in business. As of 2024, he is working at the Financial Times' Headspring Executive Development.

== Bibliography ==
- Ethicability: How to Decide What's Right and Find the Courage to Do It (5th Revised ed.). Roger Steare Consulting Limited. 2013. ISBN 978-0955236976.
- Fitt, Jacky, ed. (2019). Thinking Outside the Inbox. United Kingdom: Roger Steare Consulting Limited. ISBN 978-0-9935712-2-0.

=== Papers ===
- "The Board's Role in Establishing the Right Corporate Culture" (PDF). Business Risk – A Practical Guide for Board Members (A Director's Guide). Institute of Directors: 25–31. 2012. ISBN 9781904520-80-1. Archived from the original (PDF) on 10 July 2012.
- "The Virtue of Enterprise" (PDF). ResPublica. 2014.
- "Virtuous Banking" (PDF). ResPublica. 2014.
- Managers and their MoralDNA (PDF). Chartered Management Institute. 2014. Archived from the original (PDF) on 18 May 2015.
- The MoralDNA of Performance (PDF). Chartered Management Institute. 2014. Archived from the original (PDF) on 18 May 2015.
- The challenges of risk, culture, behaviour and corporate integrity in financial services (PDF). EY. 2017. Archived from the original (PDF) on 10 October 2015.
- Goffee, Rob; Jones, Gareth; Steare, Roger (19 March 2018). "What would a moral organisation look like?". Management Today.
