= Elselijn Kingma =

Dutch philosopher

- Born: 1981 (age 44–45)
- Other name: Elisabeth Marjolijn Kingma

Education
- Education: University of Cambridge (PhD)
- Alma mater: Universiteit Leiden
- Thesis: Health and Disease: Defining our Concepts (2008)
- Doctoral advisor: Tim Lewens

Philosophical work
- Era: 21st-century philosophy
- Region: Western philosophy
- Institutions: King's College London
- Main interests: Philosophy of medicine, Ontology of pregnancy

Elisabeth Marjolijn (Elselijn) Kingma (born 1981) is a Dutch philosopher. She is a professor at King's College London where she holds the Peter Sowerby Chair in Philosophy and Medicine.

== Career ==
She received her undergraduate degrees in Medicine (2004) and Psychology (2004) from Leiden University, and her MPhil (2005) and PhD (2008) in History & Philosophy of Science from the University of Cambridge. She did post-doctoral research in the Department for Clinical Bioethics, National Institutes of Health (USA).

Before working at King's College, she worked at the University of Southampton as Associate Professor in Philosophy. From 2012 to 2019 she was Socrates Professor in the Philosophy of Ethics of Biotechnology at the University of Eindhoven.

In 2016, she received a €1.2 million euro grant from the European Research Council for her research Better Understanding the Metaphysics of Pregnancy (BUMP). In 2020, she was awarded the Philip Leverhulme Prize, given annually to researchers at an 'early stage of their careers whose work has had international impact and whose future career is exceptionally promising.'
