= Arundel House =

Demolished mansion in City of Westminster, London

Coordinates: 51°30′43″N 0°6′51″W

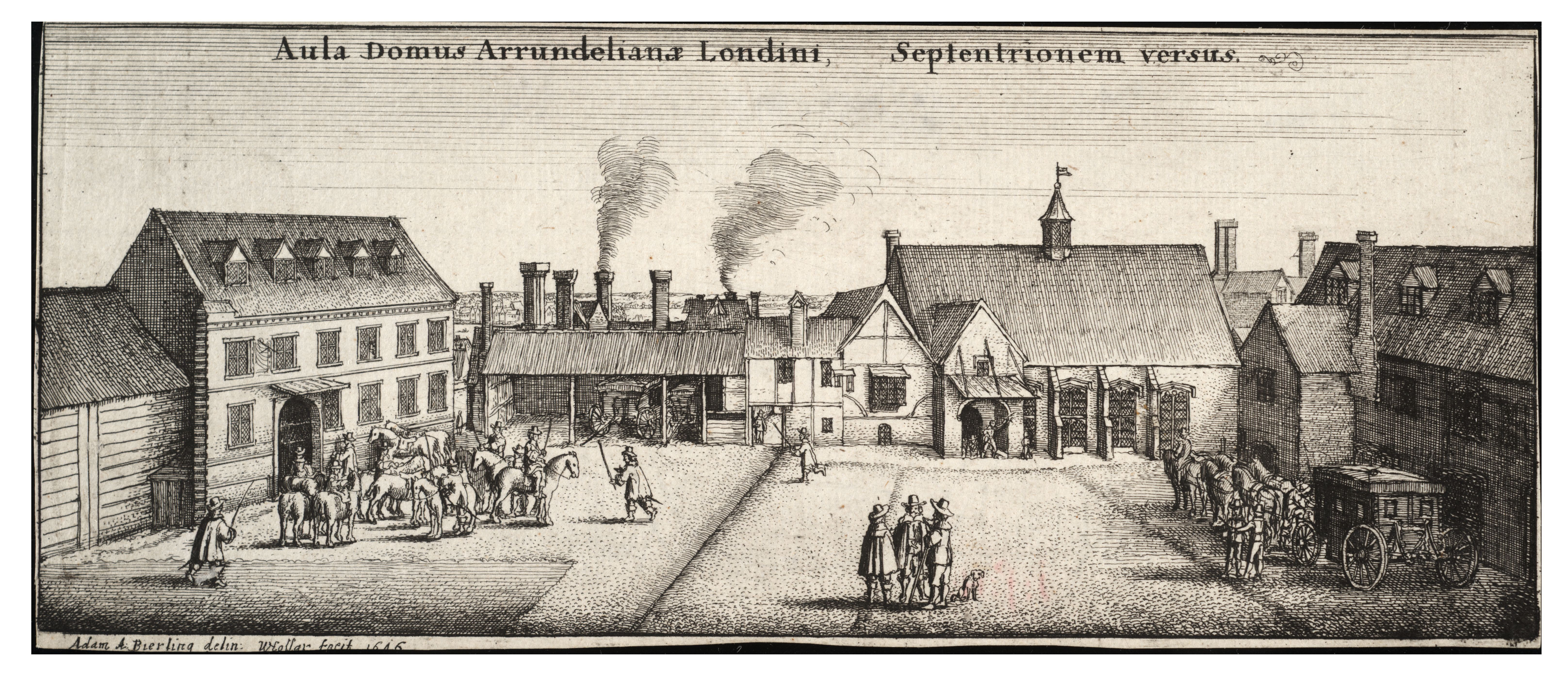
Arundel House (viewed from the north), 1646 engraving by Adam Bierling after a drawing by its then occupant, Wenceslaus Hollar

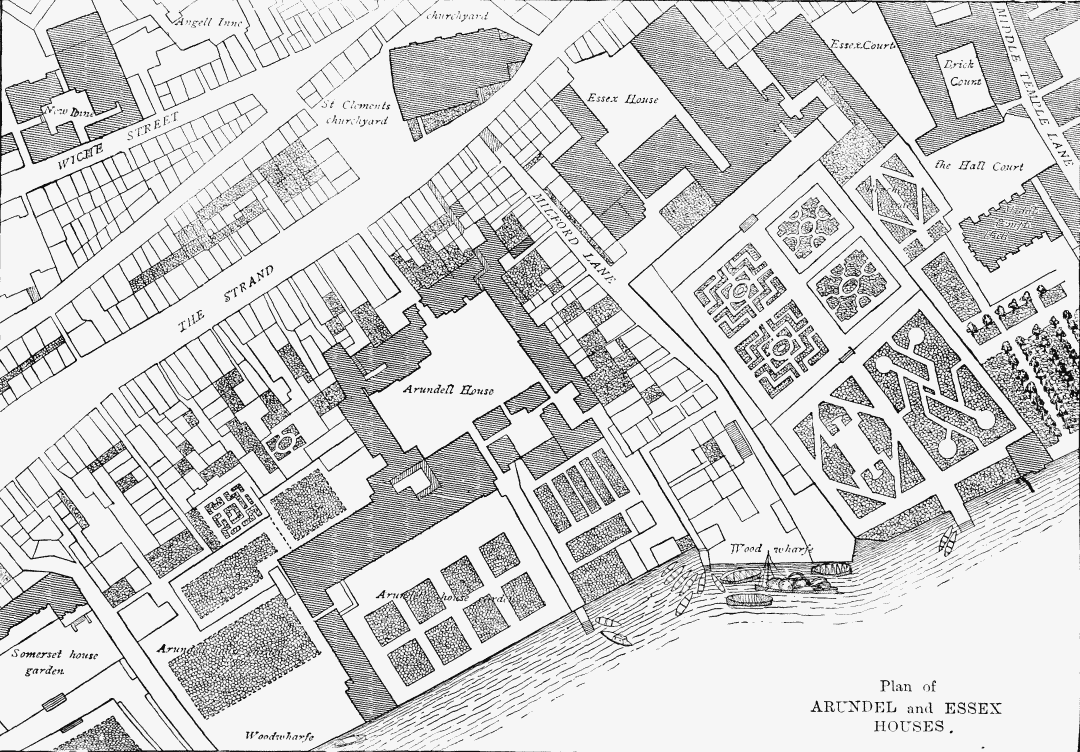
Map of Arundel House, drawn by Ogilby and Morgan, c. 1676

Arundel House was a London town-house located between the Strand and the River Thames, near the Church of St Clement Danes.

== History ==
Arundel House Act 1670
- Act of Parliament
- Parliament of England
- Long title: An Act for building Arundell House, and Tenements thereunto belonging.
- Citation: 22 & 23 Cha. 2. c. 19 Pr.
- Territorial extent: England and Wales]

Dates
- Royal assent: 22 April 1671
- Commencement: 24 October 1670 (Note: Start of session.)

Status: Current legislation

During the Middle Ages, it was the London residence of the Bishops of Bath and Wells, when it was known as Bath Inn, similarly to other grand London town-houses like Lincoln's Inn and Gray's Inn. In 1539, at the Dissolution of the Monasteries, it was granted by King Henry VIII to William Fitzwilliam, Earl of Southampton.

It reverted to the Crown on Fitzwilliam's death and was re-granted in 1545 by King Henry VIII to Thomas Seymour, 1st Baron Seymour of Sudeley, a younger brother of Jane Seymour (the king's third wife) and younger brother of Edward Seymour, 1st Duke of Somerset, Lord Protector and uncle of the infant King Edward VI. After Thomas Seymour's execution for treason in 1549, the house was sold to Henry Fitz Alan, 12th Earl of Arundel, for about £40.

It was later inherited through marriage by the Howard family and housed the Arundel Marbles, the famous sculpture collection of Thomas Howard, 2nd Earl of Arundel (1585–1646), most of which is now at the Ashmolean Museum in Oxford, although a 2nd-century AD relief from Ephesus kept at the house may be seen in the 17th-century gallery at the Museum of London.

According to The Oxford Dictionary of Music (1994), the first performance of Thomas Tallis's forty-part motet, Spem in alium, probably took place in the Long Gallery of Arundel House in 1568 or 1569.

Around the year 1618, the court architect Inigo Jones designed an Italianate gateway for Arundel House, and probably a wing known from the view by Cornelius Bol, and the building with dormer windows seen in Hollar's engraving.

During the late 1620s and early 1630s, the mathematician William Oughtred had a room at Arundel House, where he instructed the Earl's son and gave direction to other mathematicians. The house also hosted the Earl's protégé, the artist and topographer Wenceslaus Hollar. The Royal Society held its meetings there during the late 1660s.

Under the ancient name of Bath Inn, it had housed Henry Percy, 9th Earl of Northumberland, after his release from the Tower of London in 1621. Arundel House was eventually demolished, and it is commemorated today by Arundel Street and Surrey Street.

== Present-day site ==
The Strand Lane Baths are situated within the former grounds. They are now in the ownership of the National Trust.

During the late 19th century, a new building named Arundel House was constructed in the Tudor Revival style. It is located at the foot of Arundel Street, on the corner of Temple Place. It is currently a conference centre and serves as the headquarters of the International Institute for Strategic Studies.
