= Surrey Street =

Street in the City of Westminster, London

Coordinates: 51.5117°N 0.1154°W

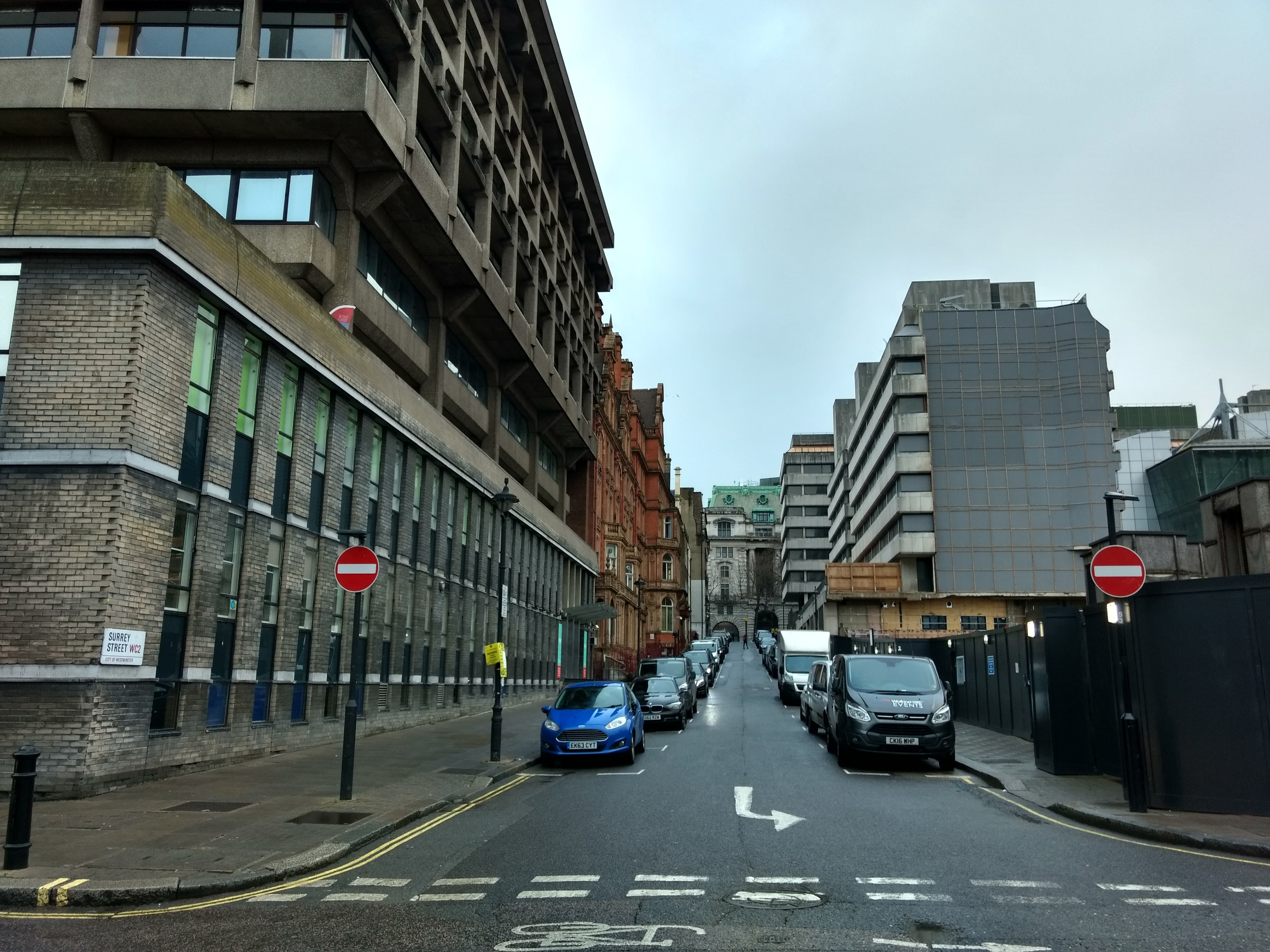
Surrey Street, London

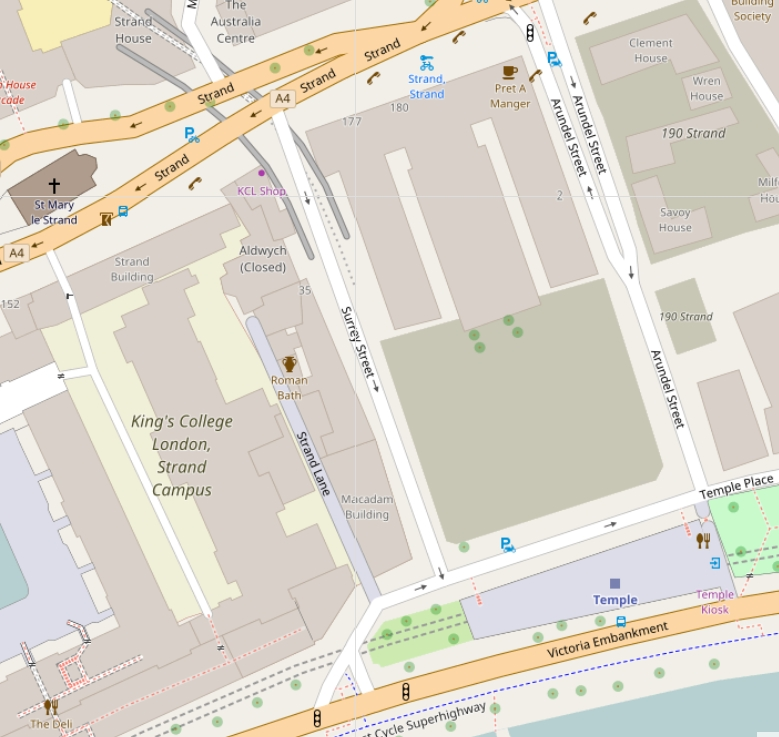
The vicinity of Surrey Street, January 2017

Surrey Street in the City of Westminster, London, runs from Strand in the north to Temple Place in the south. It was built on land once occupied by Arundel House and its gardens.

== History ==
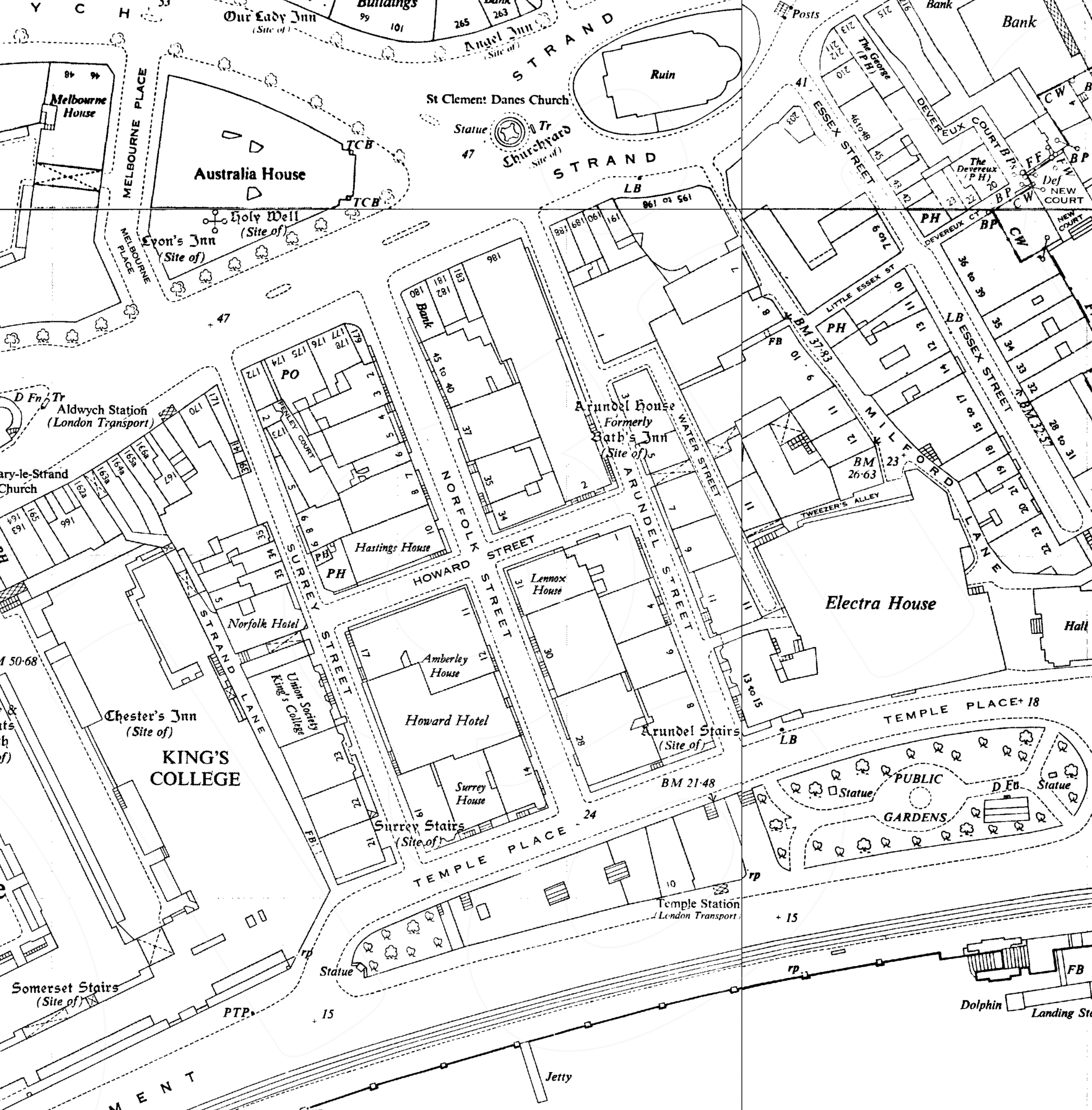
The vicinity of Surrey Street (left) on a 1950s Ordnance Survey map

Surrey Street was built on land once occupied by Arundel House and its gardens, the property of the Howard family, Dukes of Norfolk. Surrey Street and its neighbouring streets, Arundel, Howard, and Norfolk, were all built after Arundel House was demolished by the earl of Arundel in 1678.

The street was joined on its eastern side by Howard Street before that street was demolished in the 1970s. The entire western half of the street has formed part of the Strand Campus of King's College London since the end of World War II.

== Former inhabitants ==
Former inhabitants of Surrey Street include the diarist John Evelyn in 1696 and the dramatist William Congreve in the early eighteenth century..
