= Temple Place =

Street in the City of Westminster, London

Coordinates: 51°30′40.37″N 0°6′50.07″W

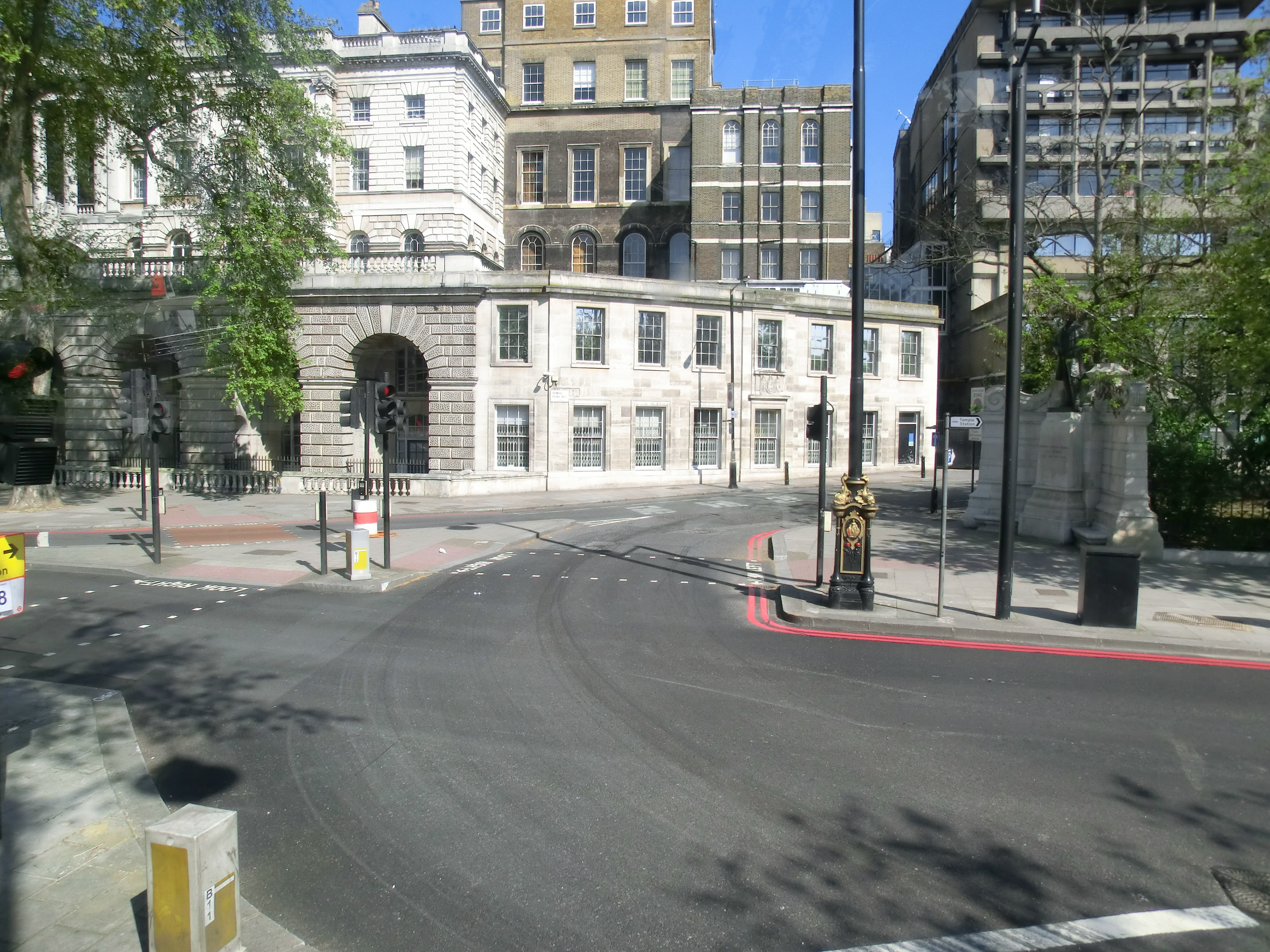
West end of Temple Place

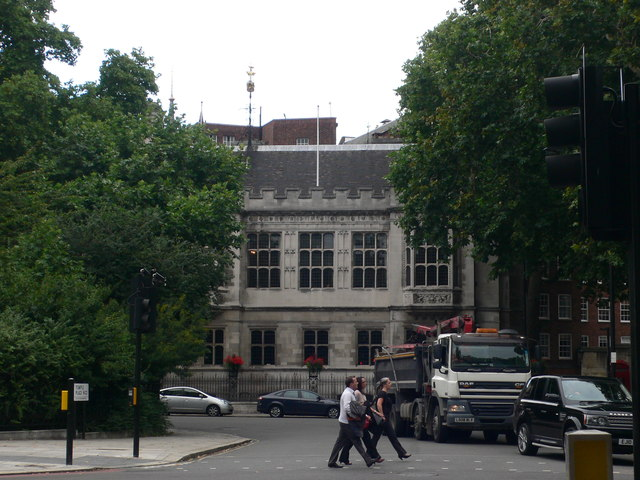
East end of Temple Place, with Two Temple Place in the centre

Temple Place is a street in the City of Westminster that runs parallel with Victoria Embankment along the River Thames. The name of the street refers to the Knights Templar who once lived in the Temple area of London.

== Location ==
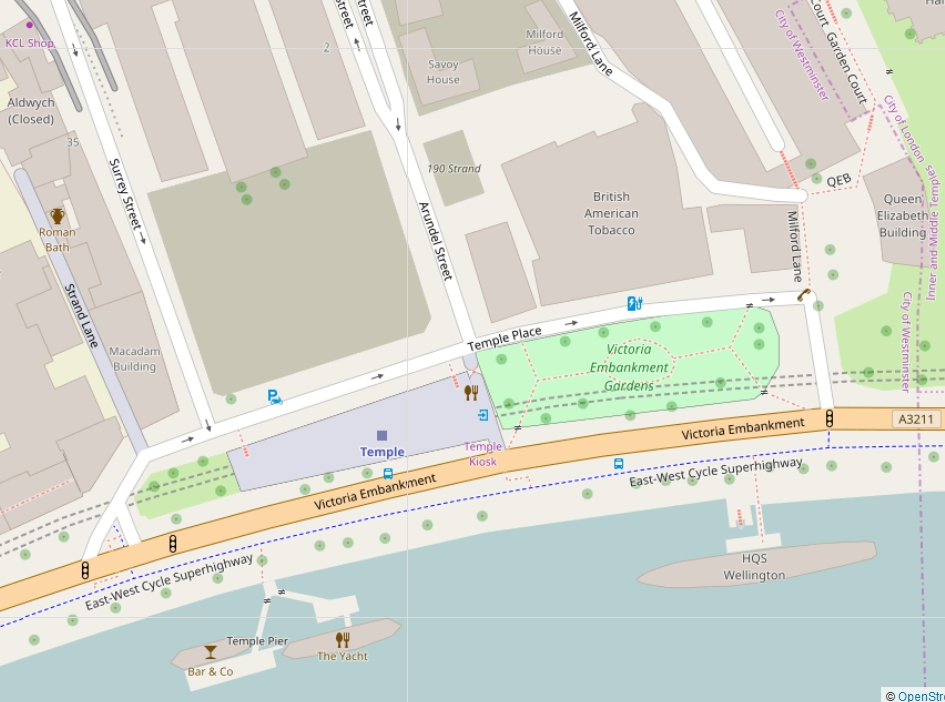
Map of the vicinity of Temple Place

Temple Place runs west–east, parallel with Victoria Embankment, along the River Thames. On its north side, it is joined by Strand Lane, Surrey Street, Arundel Street, and Milford Lane. Norfolk Street, which once joined on the north side, no longer exists. On the south side are Temple underground station at the western end and Victoria Embankment Gardens at the eastern end, divided by a pedestrian route north–south from which the station and gardens may be accessed.

== Buildings ==
The International Institute for Strategic Studies is on the north side.

Two Temple Place was built on the north side at the eastern end in 1895. Around the same time, Bodley and Garner's London School Board Building was erected in Temple Place. It was replaced by Electra House, the headquarters of Cable & Wireless, in 1929. It was damaged during the Second World War when on 24 July 1944 a V1 flying bomb hit the east of the building, demolishing part of it, blocking Milford Lane and trapping people in rubble at 28 Essex Street. Three people died and seventeen were injured. The building was repaired but demolished in 1999 and replaced by Globe House, the building that is now the headquarters of British American Tobacco.

== Gallery ==
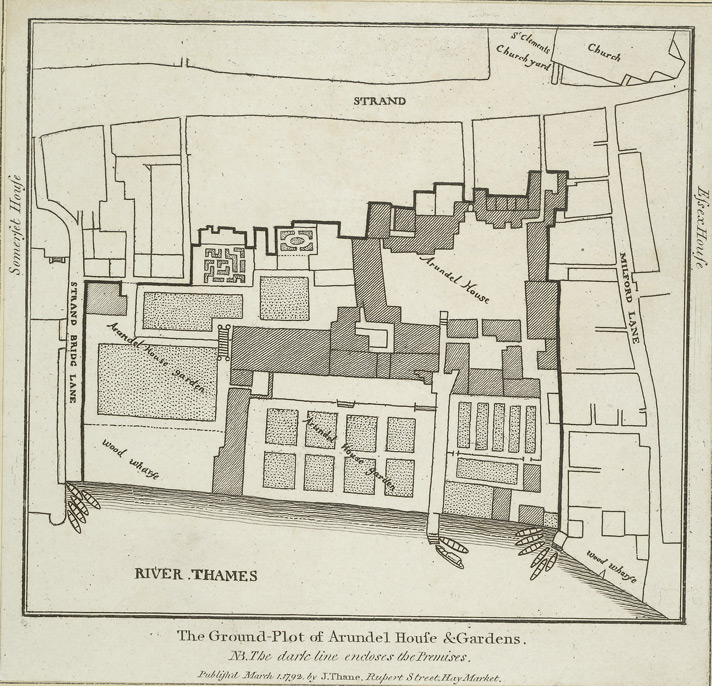
1792 map of the area

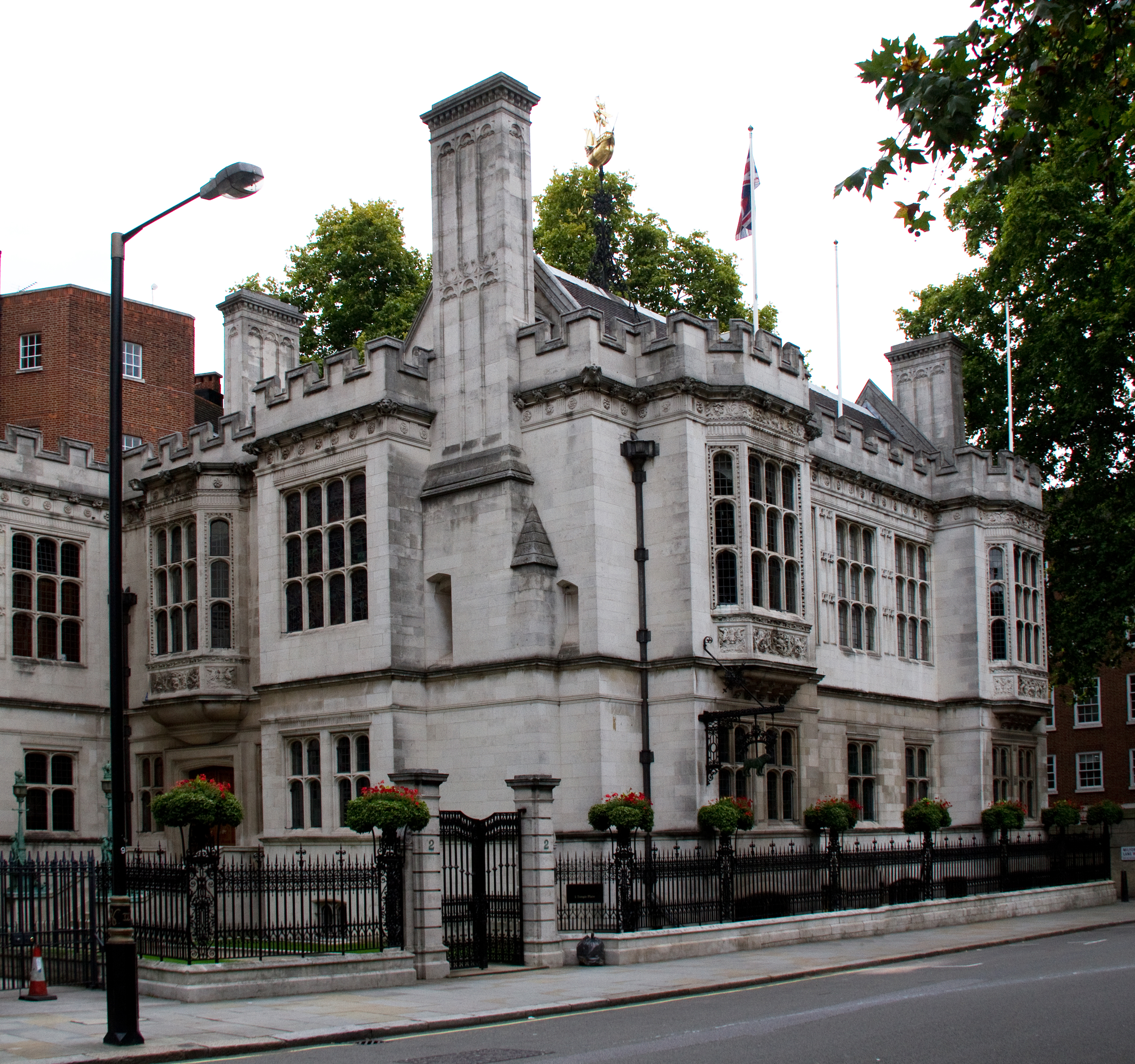
Two Temple Place

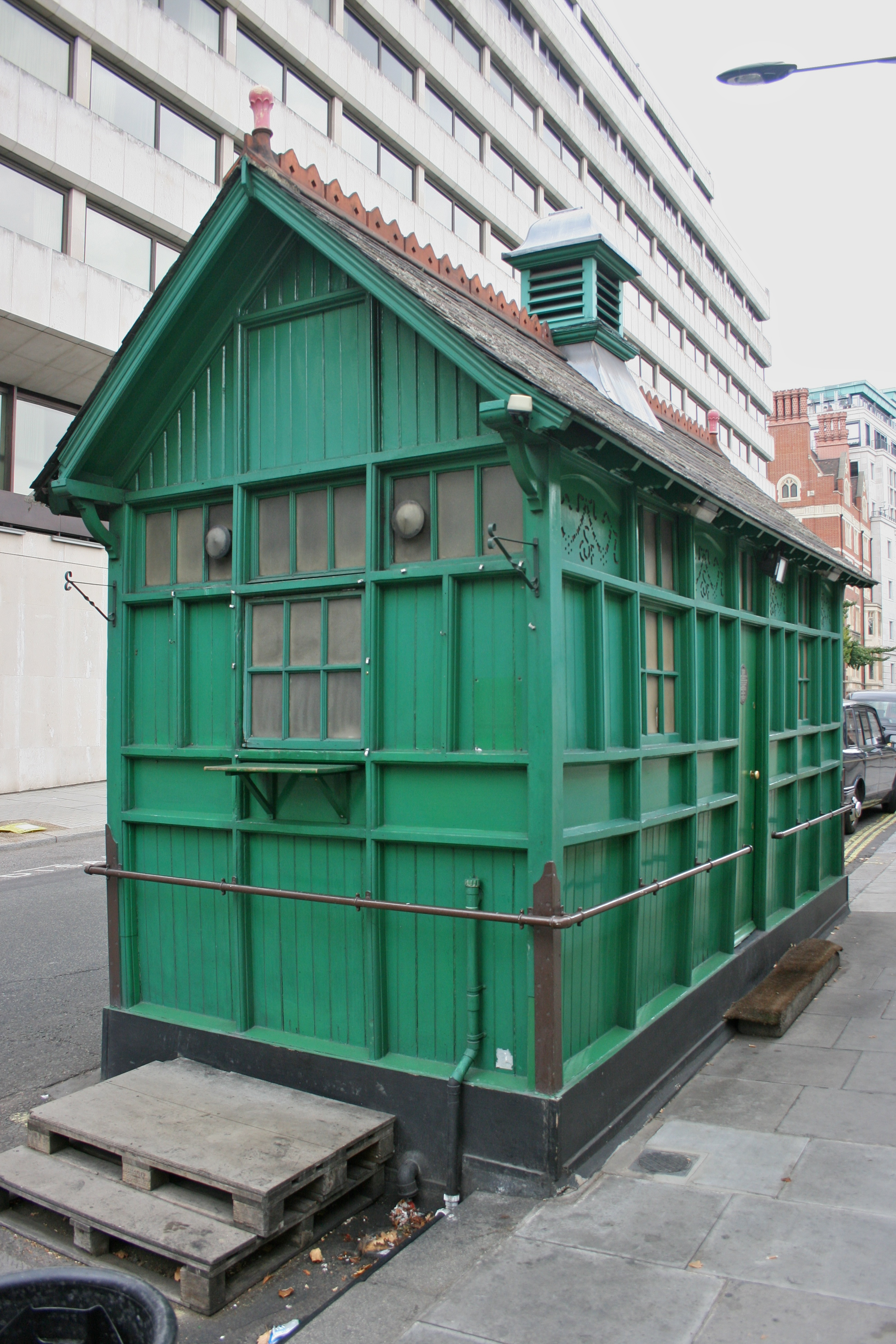
The cabmen's shelter on the south side of Temple Place
