= John Crowther =

British watercolourist

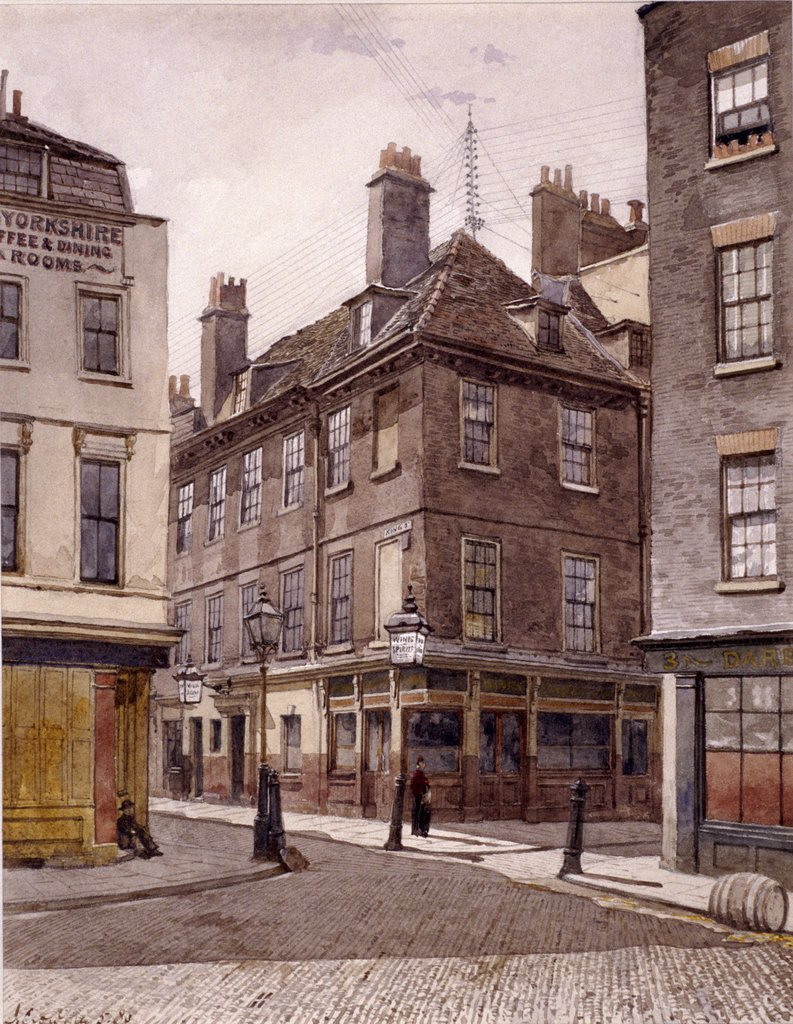
King Street, Stepney. John Crowther, watercolour.

John Crowther (1837 – c. 1902) was an English watercolour painter. He exhibited at the Royal Academy and was commissioned by Charles Chadwyck-Healey to record the threatened architecture and streets of Victorian London.

== Early life and family ==
John Crowther was born in Pudsey, Yorkshire, England, in 1837. He married Eleanor and they had daughters Emily A.P. Crowther and Lizzy B. (Blanche) Crowther. At the time of the 1871 census he was living at Manningham, Yorkshire, but by 1881 he was at Oakley Crescent, Chelsea, London. At the time of the 1901 census he was living in Evandale Road, Lambeth, London.

== Career ==
Crowther exhibited at the Royal Academy, the Royal Society of British Artists and the Royal Institute of Painters in Water Colours from 1876 to the late 1890s.

In 1879, he was commissioned by the barrister Charles Chadwyck-Healey (1845-1919), later Sir Charles, to record the buildings endangered by the expansion and modernisation of Victorian London. Over 15 years he produced over 440 watercolours and drawings of central and suburban London, including many of the Inns of Court, home to London's barristers. His other subjects included coaching inns, manor houses, and the interiors of the City of London's livery halls.

== Death and legacy ==
Crowther died around 1902.

In 1961, Sir Edward Chadwyck-Healey (died 1979), the grandson of Sir Charles Chadwyck-Healey, donated a collection of Crowther's work commissioned by his grandfather to the City of London's Guildhall Library where it is known as the Chadwyck Healey Collection. In 2009 the collection was transferred to the London Metropolitan Archives.

== Exhibitions ==
- 1947, display of watercolours at Guildhall Art Gallery.
- 1963, display of drawings at Guildhall Art Gallery.
- c. 2005, a two-part exhibition of drawings of interiors at the Guildhall Library.

== Gallery ==
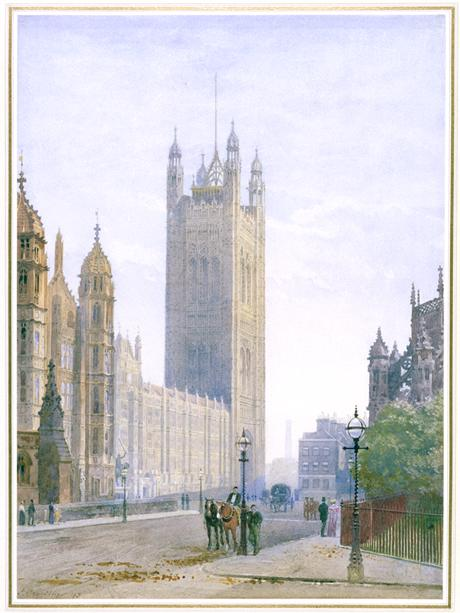
The Victoria Tower of the Houses of Parliament Seen from Parliament Square, 1893.

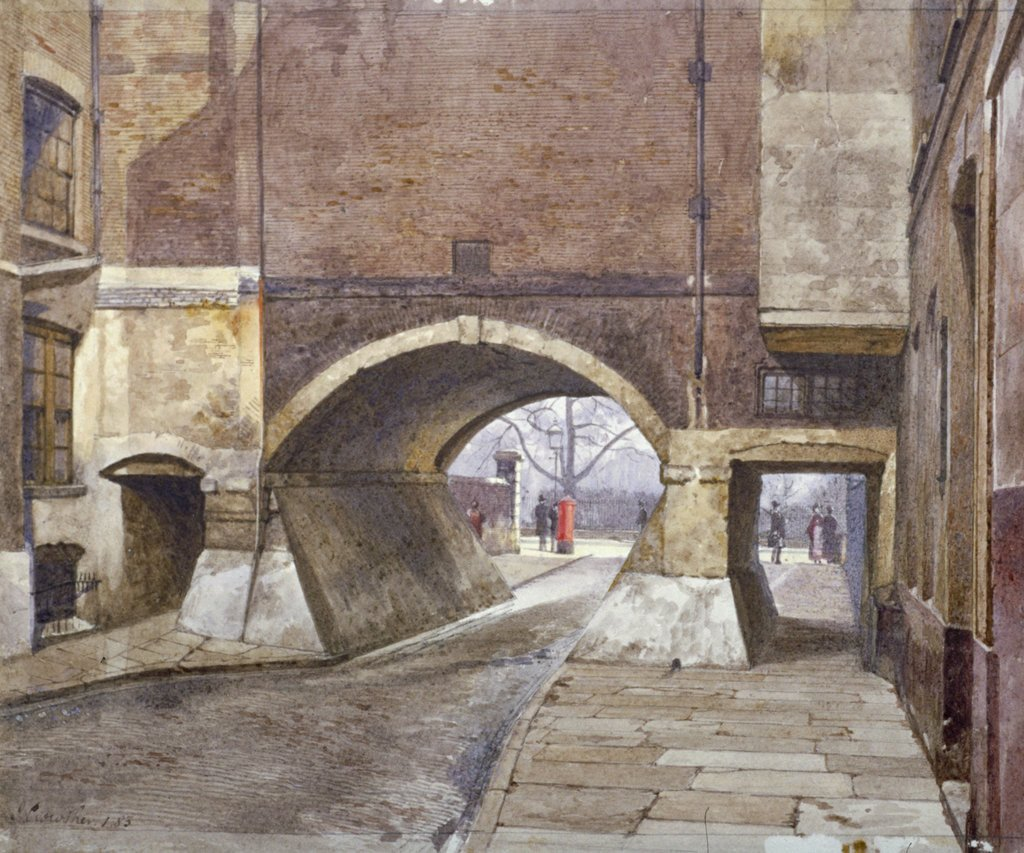
View of the entrance to Lincoln's Inn Fields in Duke Street (Duke Street was demolished by 1905 during the construction of Kingsway, the arch thereafter)

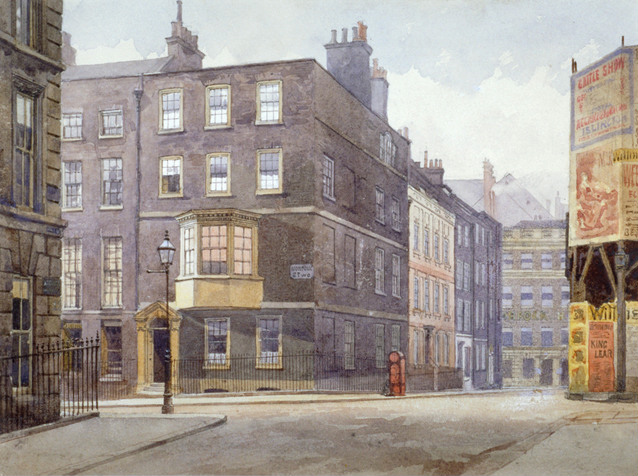
View of the Junction of Howard Street and Norfolk Street, London, 1880. (both streets demolished c.1970s)

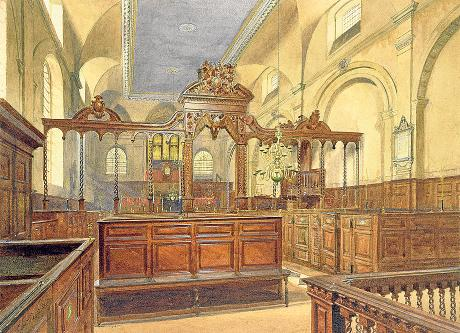
Wren's All Hallows the Great, 1884. (demolished 1894)
