= Sherrilyn Roush =

American philosopher

Sherrilyn Roush is an American philosopher and Professor of Philosophy in UCLA Department of Philosophy specializing in the philosophy of science and epistemology.

== Career ==
She joined King's College London in 2014 after accepting the inaugural Peter Sowerby Chair in Philosophy and Medicine. Previously, Roush was an assistant professor at the Department of Philosophy at Rice University (1999–2006). She was then an associate professor and then a full professor of philosophy at U. C. Berkeley. Starting winter quarter 2018, she is professor of philosophy at UCLA.

== Philosophy ==
Her book Tracking Truth presents a unified treatment of knowledge, evidence, and epistemological realism and anti-realism about science, based on the idea that knowing is responsiveness to the way the world is, and that this is an ability to follow the truth through time and changing circumstances. Responsiveness is defined for empirical knowledge by a reformulation of Robert Nozick’s tracking conditions—for example: if p were false, then S wouldn't believe p—using conditional probability instead of counterfactuals. Roush argues that the new tracking view is superior to other externalist views of knowledge, including process reliabilism. Of particular interest are the new view's fallibilist account of knowledge of logical truth, its treatment of reflective knowledge and lottery propositions, its solutions to the value problem and the generality problem, its implications about skepticism, and its explanation of why knowledge is power in the Baconian sense.

In the second half of the book it is argued that the tracking theory of evidence is best formulated and defended as a confirmation theory based on the Likelihood Ratio. The tracking theories of knowledge and evidence thereby fit together to provide a deep explanation of why having better evidence makes you more likely to know. Finally, the book argues that confirmation theory is relevant to debates about scientific realism, and defends a position intermediate between realism and anti-realism on the basis of a view about what having evidence requires.
