= Milford Lane =

Street in the City of Westminster, London

Coordinates: 51.5124°N 0.1133°W

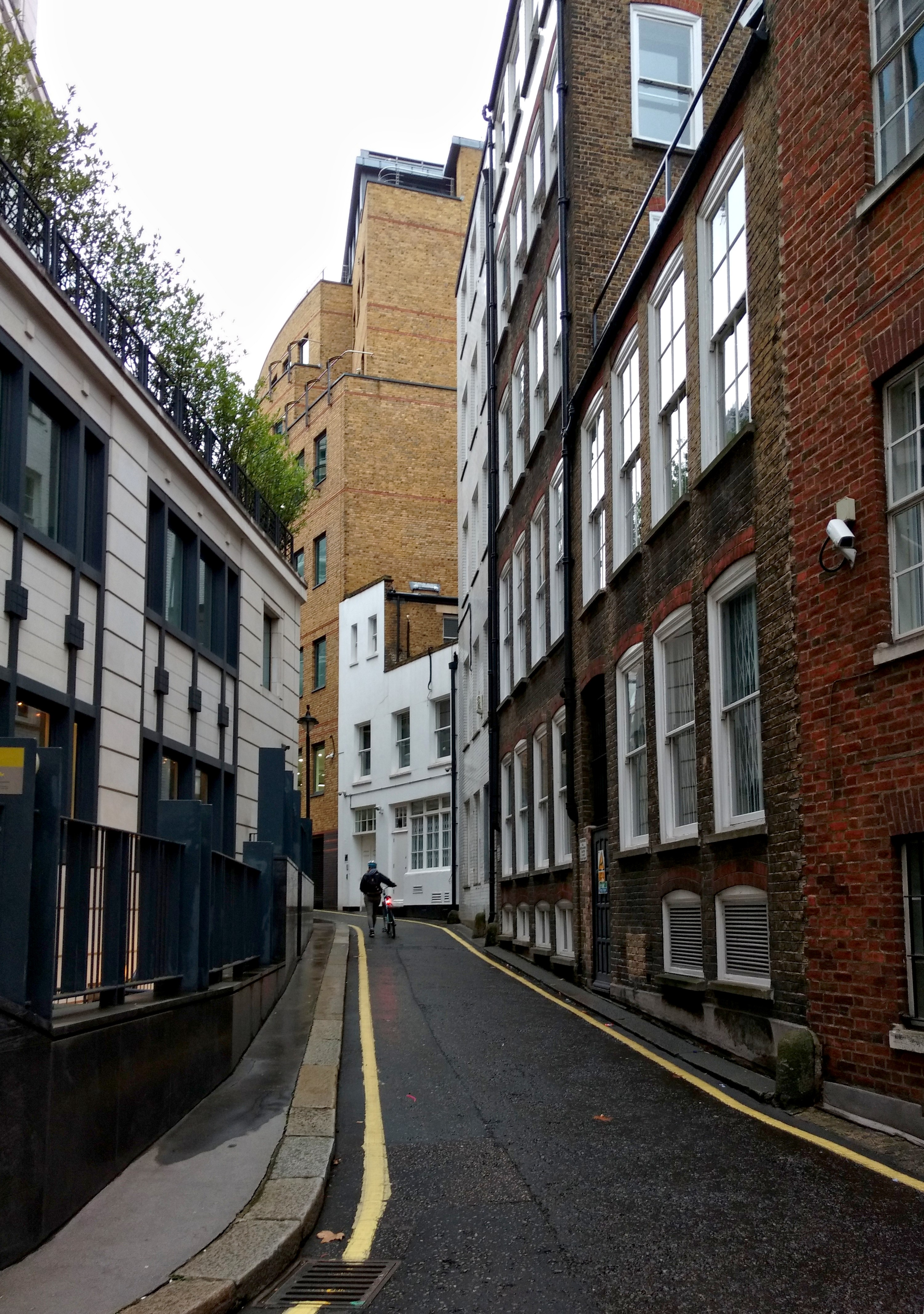
Milford Lane looking north

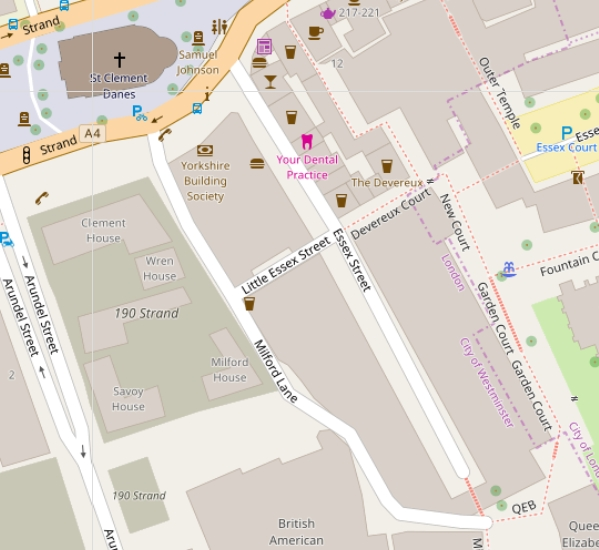
Location of Milford Lane

Milford Lane is a narrow street in the City of Westminster that runs from Strand in the north to a brief walkway section leading to Temple Place in the south. It is joined by Little Essex Street and Essex Street on its eastern side. Maltravers Street once joined the lane to Arundel Street, but ceased to exist when building work at 190 Strand was completed.

== History ==
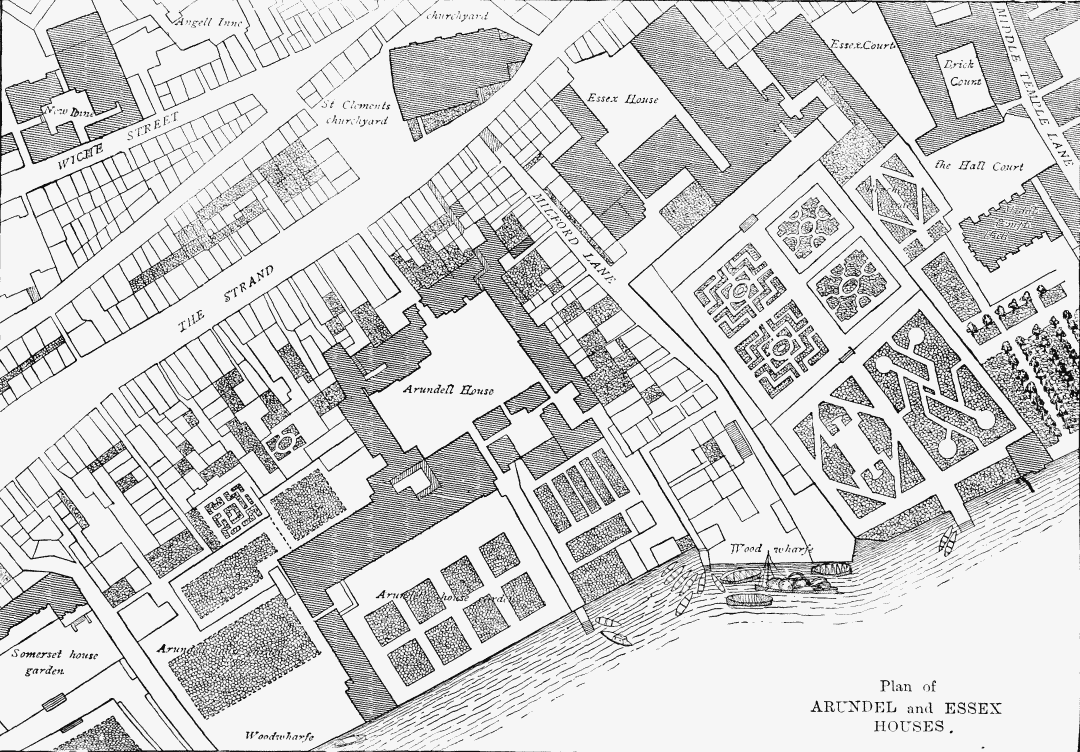
Map by Wenceslaus Hollar (c. 1670s) showing Milford Lane when it divided the estates of Essex and Arundel

The lane possibly takes its name from the ford that crossed a stream that roughly followed the course of Essex Street. (Note: Edward Walford, in Old and New London (1878), refers to the discovery in 1802 of the remains of a stone bridge, spanning 11 feet (3.4 m), covered by rubbish, found during digging between the city gate of Temple Bar and the east end of St. Clement's Church, which locates part of the stream on the Strand itself close to the entrance to Essex Street. In 1878, T.C. Noble wrote in his work Memorials of Temple Bar of a bridge on the Strand built by the Knights Templars by command of Edward III. The slight dip of the Strand at the north end of Essex Street and its southern steps where Milford Lane also terminates make the stream plausible for the working of a mill.)

It once marked the boundary between the London estates of Lord Essex, Essex House, and the Earl of Arundel, Arundel House.

Twezers or Tweezers Alley, which in 2016 is blocked due to building works, is the subject of one of the Quit Rents ceremonies of the City of London entered in the Great Roll of the Exchequer since 1235 by which the City must pay the Crown six horseshoes and 61 horseshoe nails for the site of its "Forge". When rendered to the Queen's Remembrancer the items are preserved in his office, and with the permission of the Crown they are loaned to the Corporation of London to be rendered again the following year.

The area was a hiding place for debtors in the 17th century.

The lane once contained a cook's shop owned by one Phipps, a black man, whose death in 1722 was sufficiently notable to be mentioned in a work on the parish dated 1876 along with the fact that his coffin had six black pall-bearers and 'sixty or seventy others of the same complexion, and about the same number of "English people" brought up the rear.'

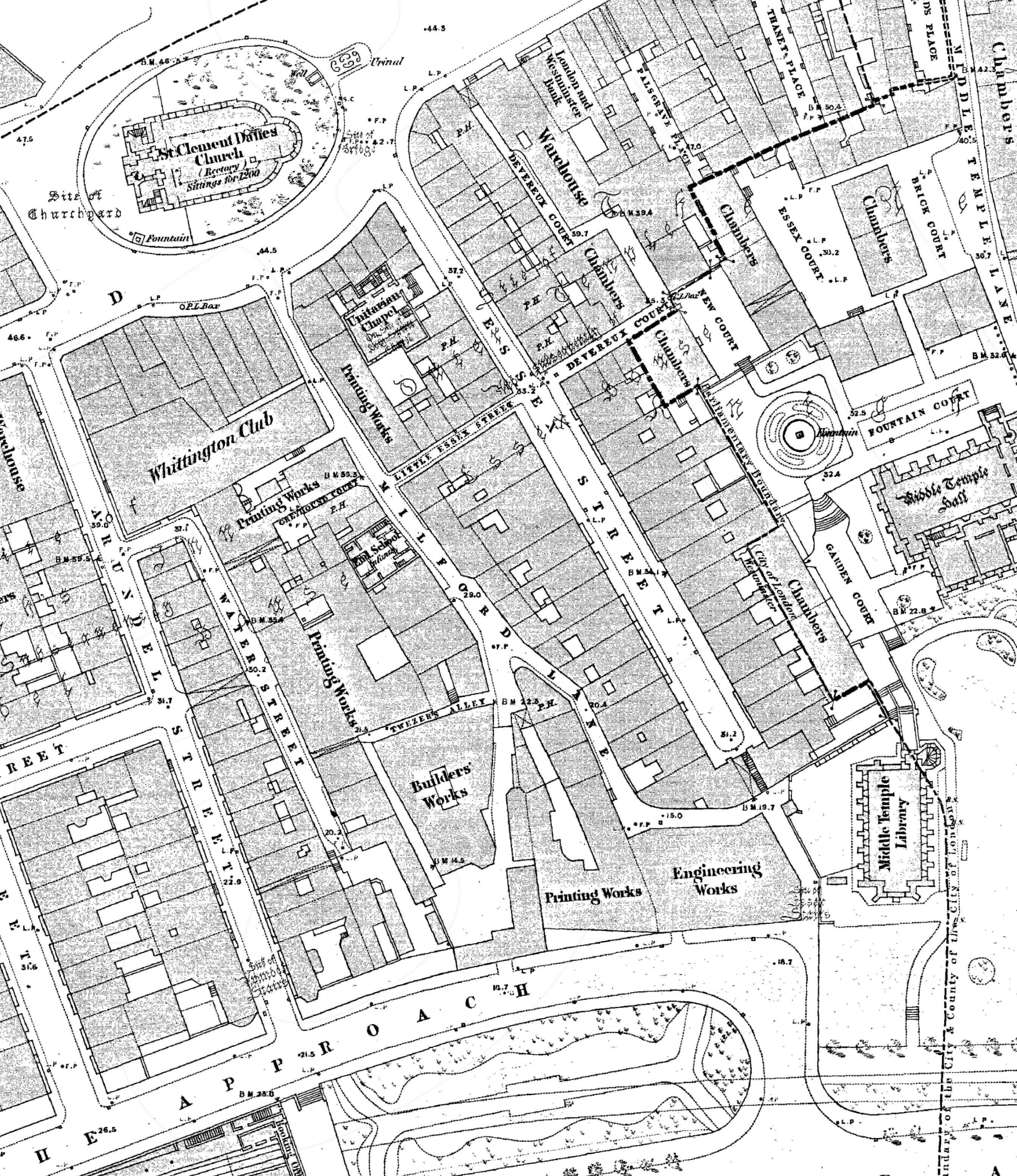
The Milford Lane area on an 1870s Ordnance Survey map after the construction of the Victoria Embankment

By the 1870s, there were three printing works in the lane, possibly reflecting its proximity to Fleet Street. The Illustrated London News was published from 198 Strand on the corner with Milford Lane and as the paper expanded it acquired Milford House and other buildings in the lane. Greyhound Court was a western siding in the 1870s named after The Greyhound public house to the south opposite Little Essex Street. An infants school was two buildings south, replacing the house of the rector of St. Clement Danes, A second public house stood at the fork in the street where the lane turns east at Twezers Alley.

== Character and current buildings ==
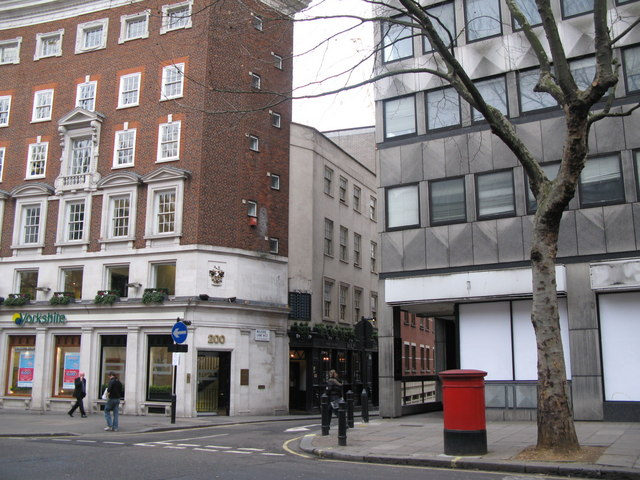
Milford Lane north end seen from Strand

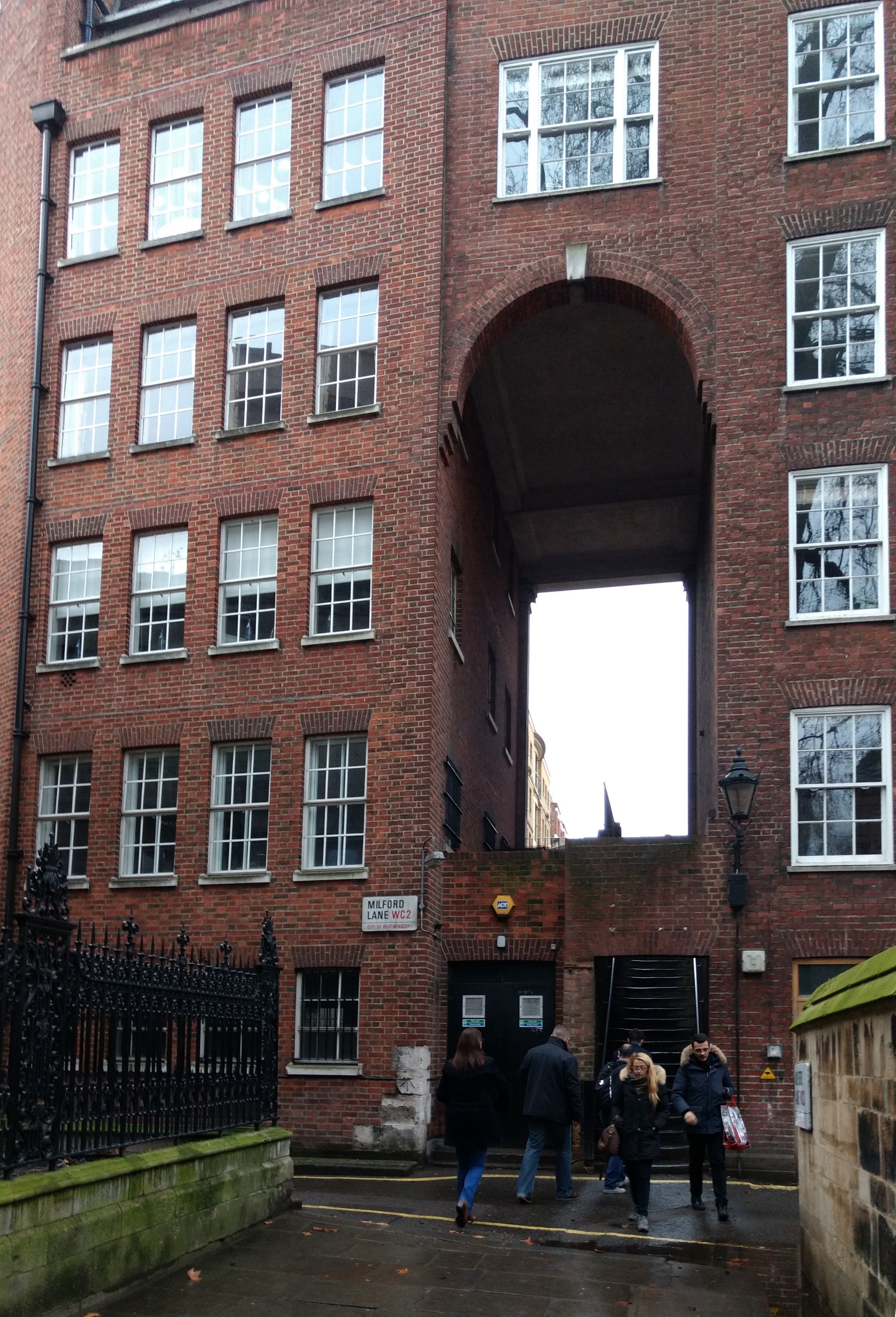
Milford Lane south end looking towards Essex Street steps

Milford Lane is mostly lined with the rears of office buildings that front other streets — Essex Street and Arundel Street. The lane is narrow with vehicular access only to the northern part.

The Temple Bar public house, behind a narrow bank building on the north-east corner, states that it was established in 1839.

The Cheshire Cheese larger public house, midway, on the corner with Little Essex Street, stands where there has been a tavern since the 16th century. It was rebuilt in 1928 to a design by Nowell Parr for the Style & Winch Brewery and is a grade II listed building.

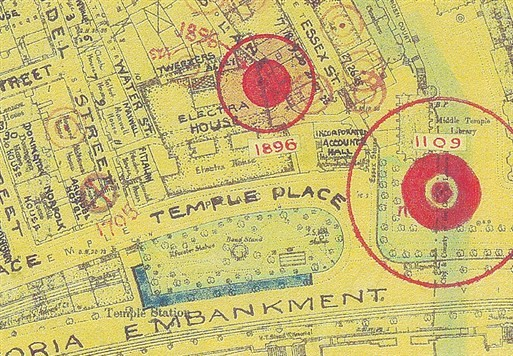
Bomb damage map showing the site where the VI flying bomb hit Electra House in 1944 (top, marked 1896) and the site of earlier damage from a parachute mine in Temple Gardens in 1940 (right)

At the south end of the lane, Two Temple Place was built in 1895. Around the same time, Bodley and Garner's London School Board Building was erected in Temple Place. It was replaced by Electra House, the headquarters of Cable & Wireless, in 1929. Its eastern side was hit by a V-1 flying bomb on 24 July 1944 during the Second World War, demolishing part of it, blocking the lane and trapping people in rubble at 28 Essex Street. Three people died, 17 were injured. The building was repaired but demolished in 1999 and replaced by Globe House, now the headquarters of British American Tobacco.

A large mixed-use development on western side of the street is known as 190 Strand, the construction of which resulted in the demolition of the modern Maltravers Street, and the enhancement of Tweezer's Alley. Three fragments of architectural sculptures by Henry Poole from the demolished United Kingdom Provident Institution offices are now located on the street.

The K2 telephone kiosk at the southern end of the lane at the junction with Temple Place is grade II listed with Historic England. The street veers to the east before a short walkway leading to Queen Elizabeth Buildings barristers' chambers on the top of the bank of the Thames, east and west of which are the lawns of Temple Gardens and trees and flowers of Victoria Embankment Gardens.

== Citations in the arts and literature ==
Milford Lane is the scene of a bawdy poem of 1716 by Charles Sackville, 6th Earl of Dorset, titled The Duel of the Crabs which recounts a battle between two armies in the pubic hair of a whore residing in Milford Lane, the first lines of which read "In Milford-lane, near to St. Clement's Steeple/There liv'd a Nymph kind to all Christian People".

== Notable residents ==
- Richard Baker, author of the Chronicle of the Kings of England. (1632–39)
