= Tom Cox (highwayman) =

English highwayman (c.1665–1690)

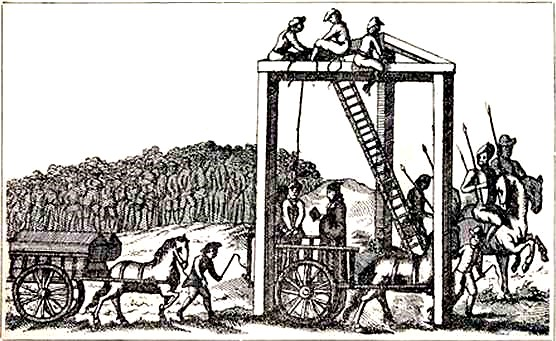
Tyburn Gallows, c.1680

Thomas Cox (c. 1665 – 12 September 1690), known as "The Handsome Highwayman", was an English highwayman, sentenced to death and hanged at Tyburn. He had a reputation for a spirited nature and it is reported that when asked if he wished to say a prayer before being hanged, he kicked the ordinary and the hangman out of the cart taking him there.

== Early life ==
Cox lived during the Restoration period. According to Alexander Smith's A Complete History of the Lives and Robberies of the Most Notorious Highwaymen, Footpads, Shoplifts and Cheats of Both Sexes (1719), Tom Cox was the youngest son of a gentleman living at Blandford, Dorsetshire.

== Career ==
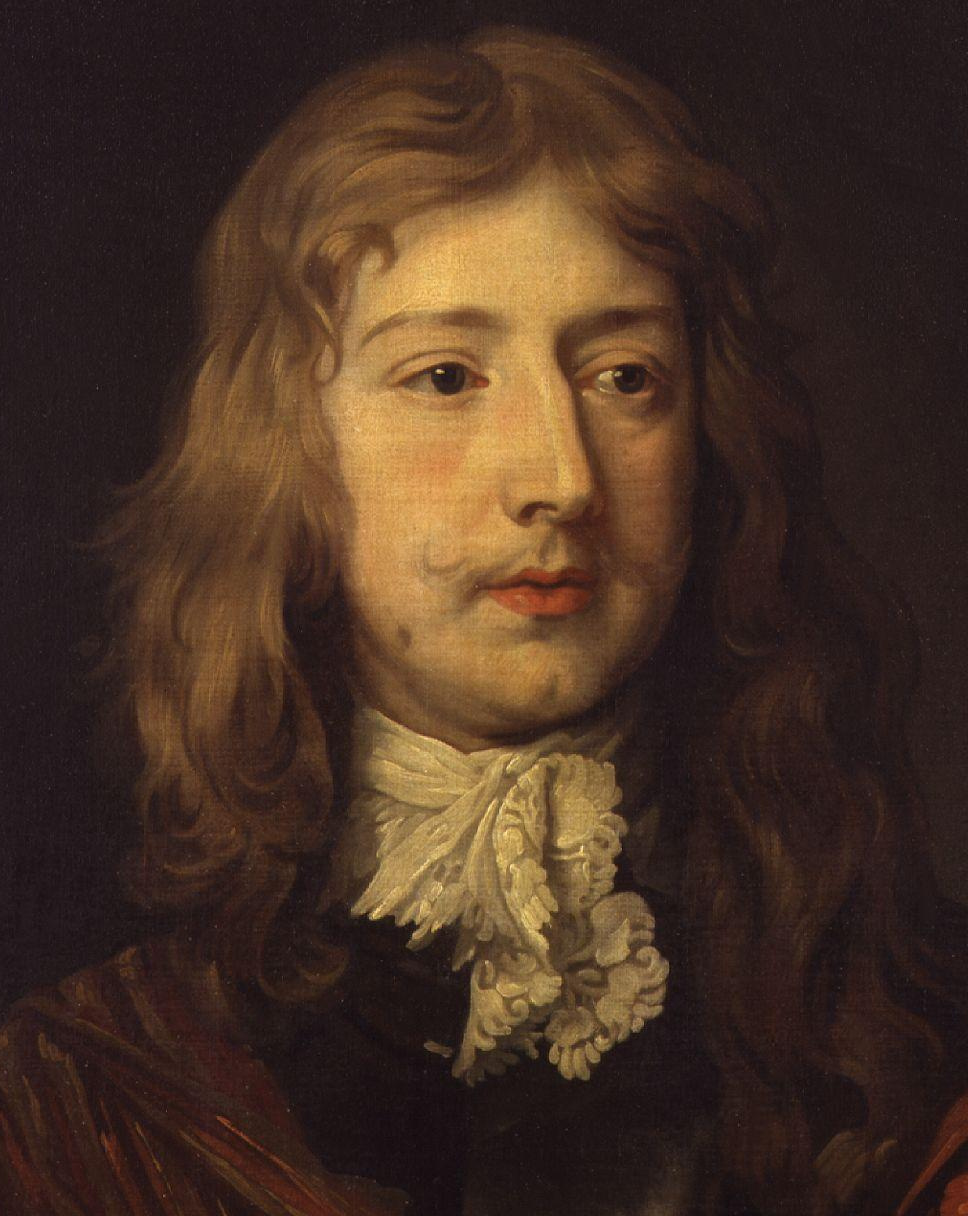
Thomas Killigrew, one of Cox's victims, by Anthony van Dyck (cropped)

Smith wrote that Cox's father left him money but having squandered it, Cox travelled to London where he fell in with a gang of highwaymen. He was tried at the assizes at Gloucester and Winchester, and for his life at Worcester, but acquitted each time. At Worcester he married a woman with a fortune of £1,500 but having dissipated it in less than two years he returned to crime. He held up Thomas Killigrew, jester to King Charles II, who asked Cox if he was in earnest. Cox is supposed to have replied, "I am in earnest, for though you live by jesting, I can't; therefore deliver your money, before a brace of balls make the sun shine through your body". In Sussex he robbed a Mr Hitchcock, a dishonest attorney of New Inn, of 350 guineas, leaving him one guinea to continue his journey. On the road from Lichfield, Cox met Madam Box, a brothel keeper of Fountain Court in the Temple, whom he knew, who told him that if he robbed her, she would see him hang, but he took her money anyway.

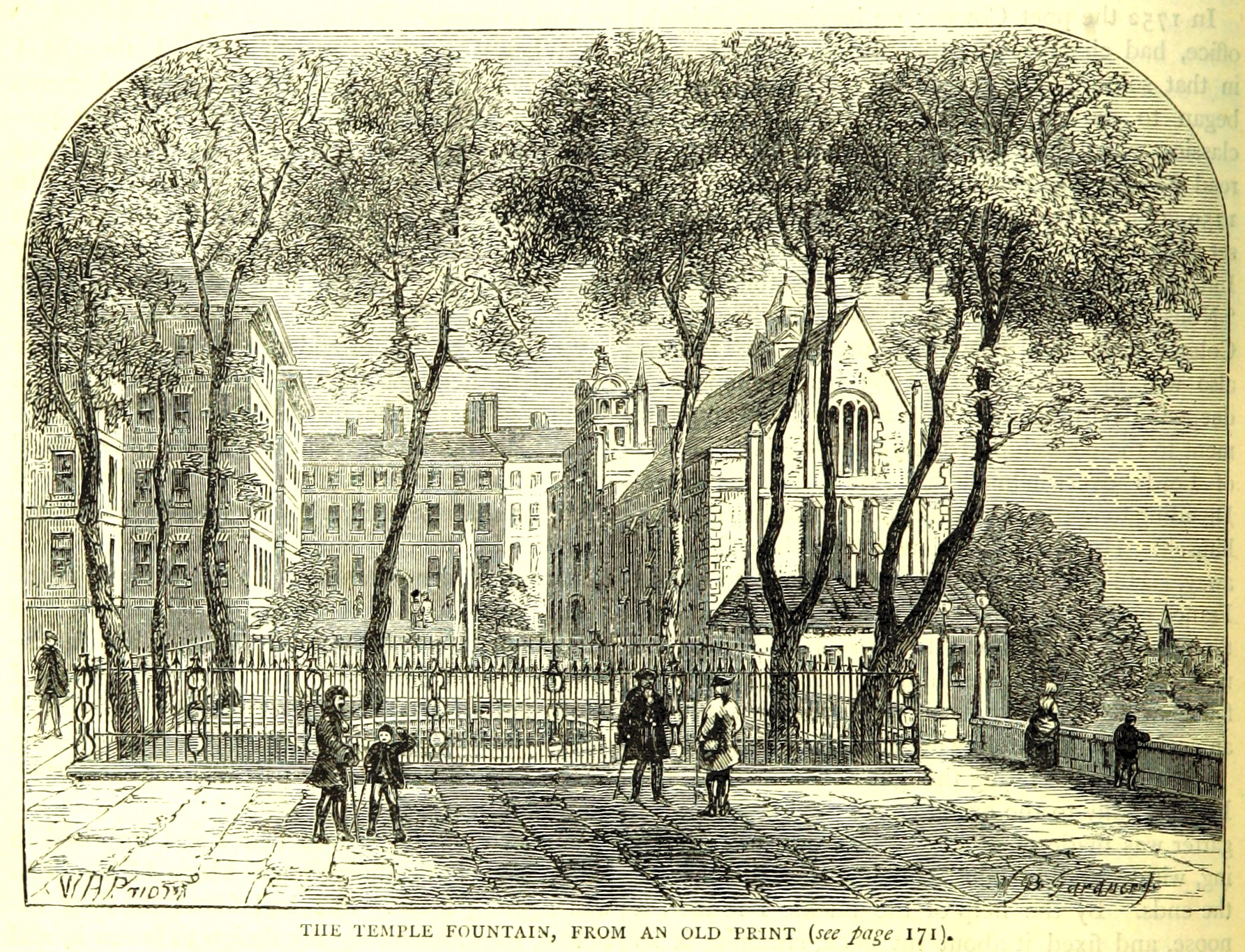
Fountain Court, Temple, home of Madam Box, brothel keeper

Cox was arrested for a highway robbery near Chard, Somerset, but according to Smith managed to break out of Ilchester prison after the jailer fell asleep drunk. He made his escape towards Coventry on a stolen horse and on the way robbed two other highwaymen when they tried to hold him up, killing one. He also robbed a nobleman he had befriended of a diamond ring and 100 guineas before killing the man's horse. His final hold-up, according to Smith, was the robbery of a farmer (Thomas Boucher) on Hounslow Heath. This last crime was Cox's undoing when the farmer, happening to be in London, saw Cox coming out of his lodgings in Essex Street near Strand, resulting in Cox's capture in nearby St Clement Danes churchyard. Cox was committed to Newgate Prison pending trial for his crimes, where he lived in luxury in the Press Yard.

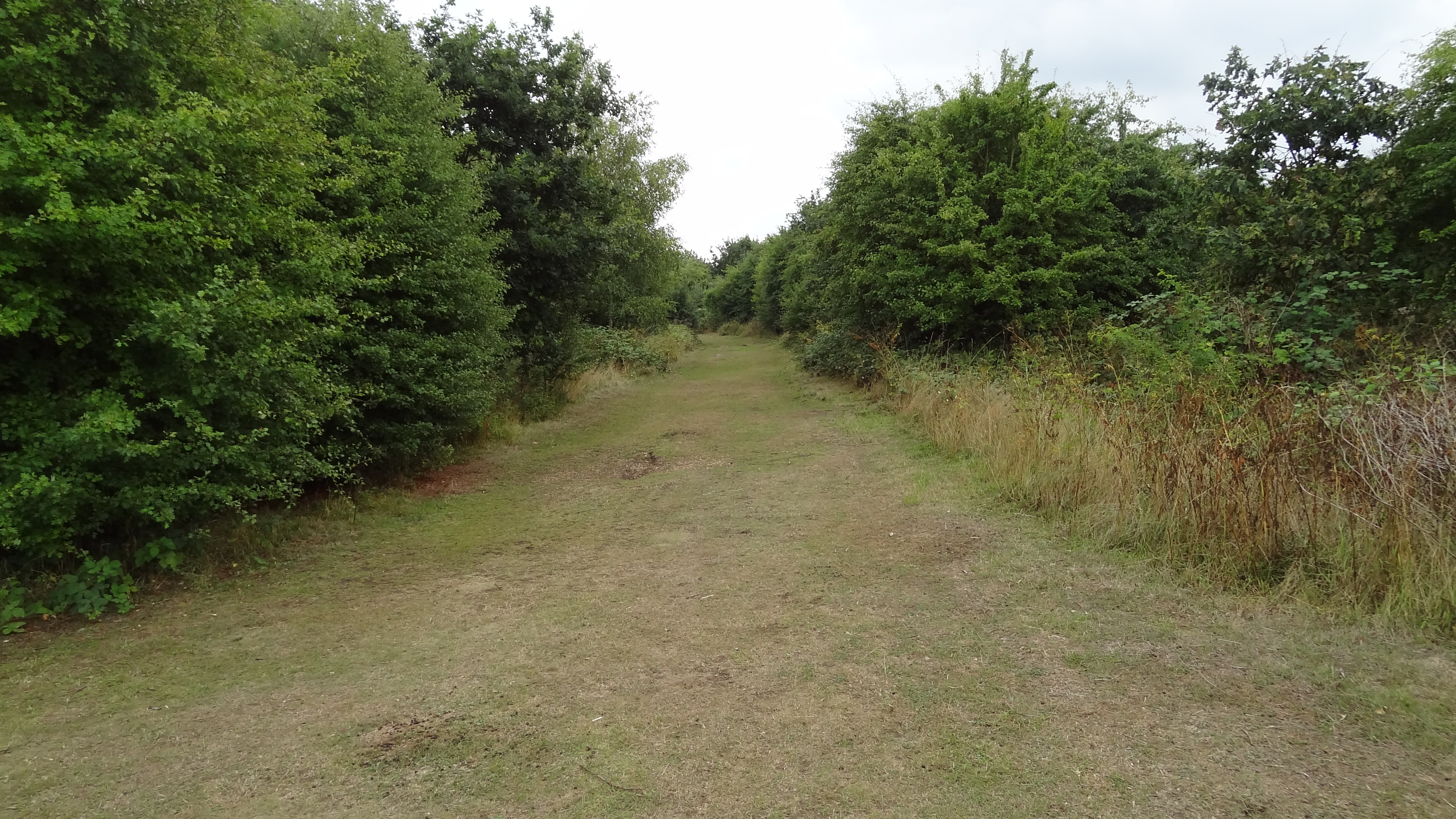
Hounslow Heath, where Cox robbed Thomas Boucher, for which he was executed.

== Death and legacy ==
Cox was sentenced to death at the Old Bailey for the robbery of Boucher and hanged at Tyburn on 12 September 1690 in his 25th year. On the way to the gallows he was asked by the ordinary, Samuel Smith, if he wished to join the other condemned men in prayer. He responded by kicking Smith and the hangman out of the cart carrying him to the gallows. Samuel Smith recorded that:

On Friday about 10 a Clock they were all 6 conveyed in 2 Carts to the Place of Execution, where being all fastned to the Tree, they were (in good order) exhorted to renew their Repentance, and to prepare themselves for their so suddain Change by Death, Mr. Ordinary taking great pains in Prayer to God for their Souls Salvation, using several cogent Arguments to prepare them to a free Confession unto Almighty God of all their former mispent Lives; to which they all readily attended except Cox and W - who were very impertinent in their Behaviour, and undecently and irreverently reflected upon the Government; for which the Ordinary gave them a suddain and a severe Check...

He was listed in James Caulfield's Blackguardiana: or, a dictionary of rogues, bawds, pimps, whores, pickpockets, shoplifters, &c. (1793) and features in a song sung by a character in the novel Rookwood (1834) by W. Harrison Ainsworth as follows:

Nor did housebreaker ever deal harder knocks
On the stubborn lid of a good strong box,
Than that prince of good fellows, TOM COX, TOM COX!
Which nobody can deny.
