= Essex Street, London =

Street in the City of Westminster

Coordinates: 51.5125°N 0.1126°W

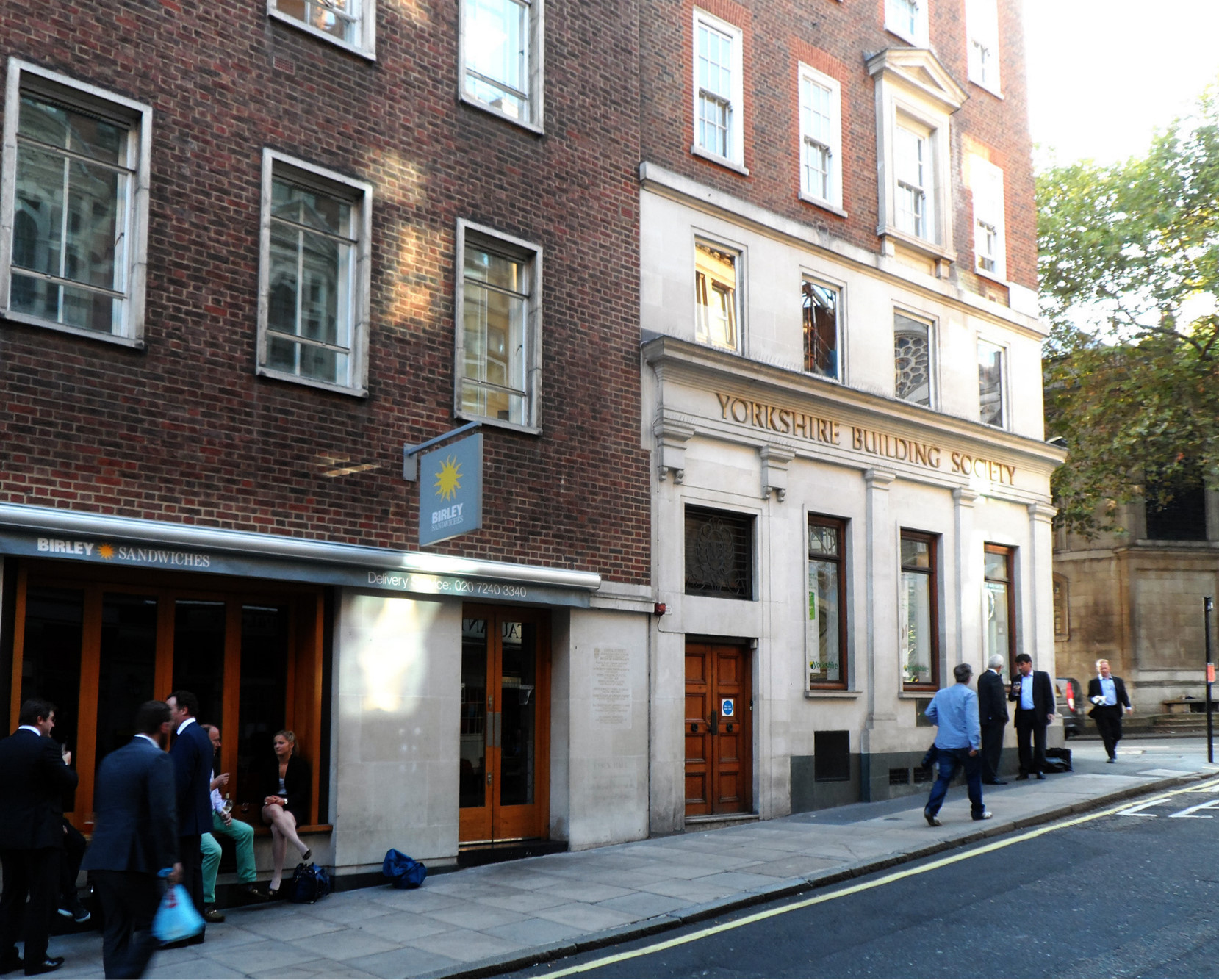
North end of Essex Street

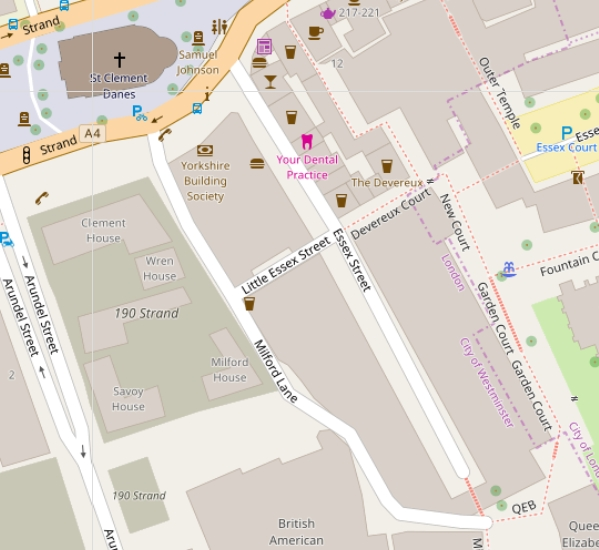
Location of Essex Street and Little Essex Street

Essex Street is a street in the City of Westminster that runs from Milford Lane in the south to Strand in the north. It is joined by Little Essex Street on its western side and Devereux Court on the eastern side. It was laid out by Nicholas Barbon in around 1675 or 1680 and contains a number of listed buildings.

== History ==
Essex Street was laid out by Nicholas Barbon between 1675 and 1680, on the grounds of the former Essex House which itself stood on the site of the Outer Temple, once owned by the Knights Templar. The highwayman Tom Cox, who was hanged at Tyburn in 1691, was captured in the nearby St Clement Danes churchyard after one of his victims spotted him coming out of his lodgings in Essex Street.

In the first half of the twentieth century, the street was known for its publisher's offices such as Chapman & Hall, and Methuen & Co. (No. 36). Macmillan were at 4 Little Essex Street until 1990. The Roman Catholic journal Merry England, edited by Wilfrid Meynell, was published from 43 Essex Street.

== Buildings ==
Essex Hall, an office building at numbers 1 to 6, is the headquarters of the British Unitarians. Prior to the Blitz, a chapel and meeting rooms were on the site, continuing the association with the first avowedly Unitarian place of worship in London, dating back to 1774, when Theophilus Lindsey founded the Essex Street Chapel.

23 Essex Street houses a firm of legal barristers.

The Edgar Wallace, a public house at No. 40, is on the site of the former Essex Head Tavern, where Samuel Johnson and Richard Brocklesby founded the Essex Head Club in 1783.

There are a number of listed buildings in the street. Numbers 11, 14, 19, 34 and 35 are all grade II listed. No. 32 is grade II* listed; California House is grade II listed; and the triumphal gateway at the southern end of the street (c.1676), which once screened it from Essex Wharf and its neighbouring wharfs beyond, is grade II listed. The gateway was damaged by bombing during the Second World War, and after repairs it was incorporated into a 1953 office building that now encloses the southern end of the street, apart from pedestrian access by steps to the southern part of Milford Lane.

== Little Essex Street ==
The Cheshire Cheese, a public house at 5 Little Essex Street, stands on a site where there has been a tavern since the 16th century. It is a Grade II listed building, which was rebuilt in 1928 by the architect Nowell Parr, on the site of an earlier pub, for the 'Style & Winch' Brewery.

== Notable former residents ==
- Sir Orlando Bridgeman, member, House of Commons and Lord Keeper of the Great Seal
- Brass Crosby, radical lawyer, member of Parliament and Lord Mayor of London
- Henry Fielding, novelist and author of Tom Jones
- James Savage, architect, had his offices in the street

== Gallery ==
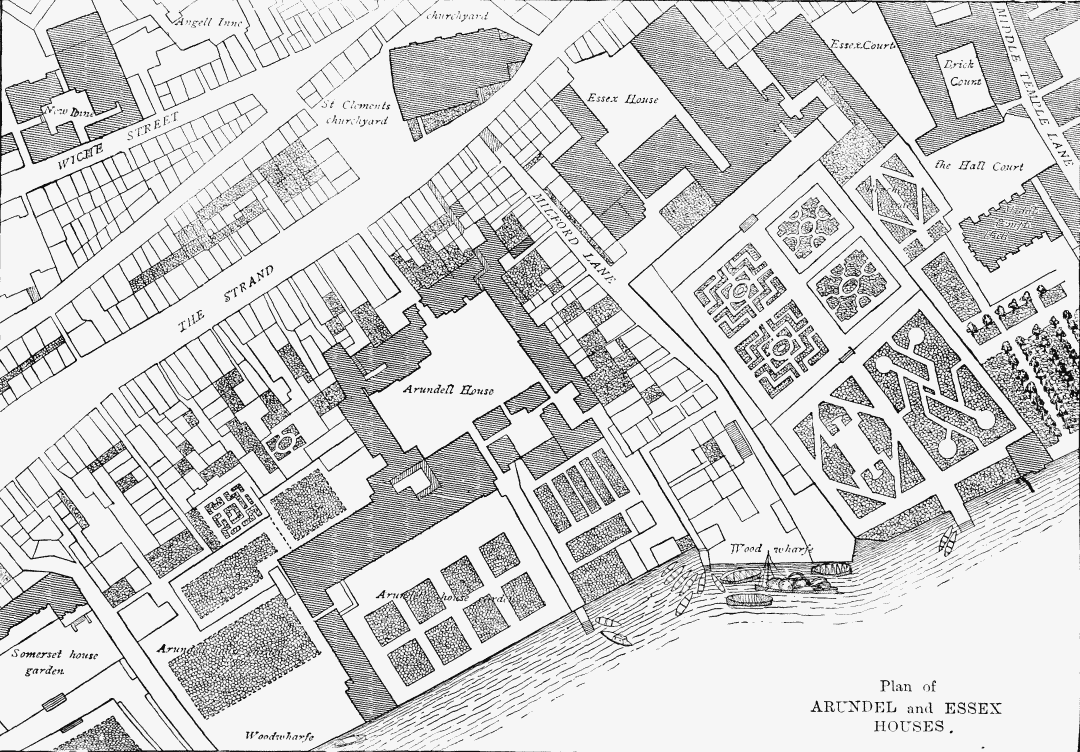
Map by Wenceslaus Hollar (c. 1677) showing Essex House and grounds before Essex Street was laid out

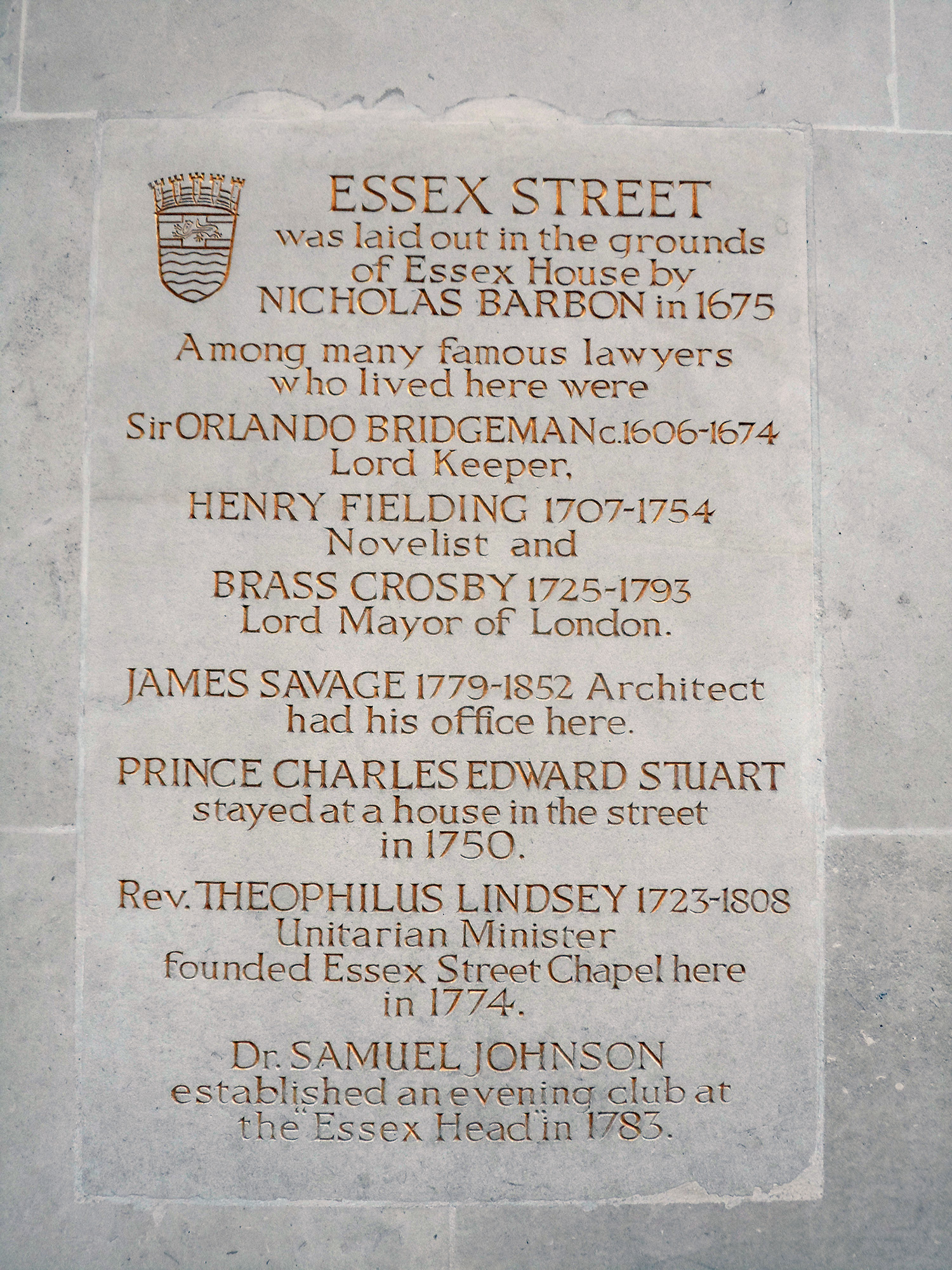
London County Council plaque on Essex Hall at 7 Essex Street

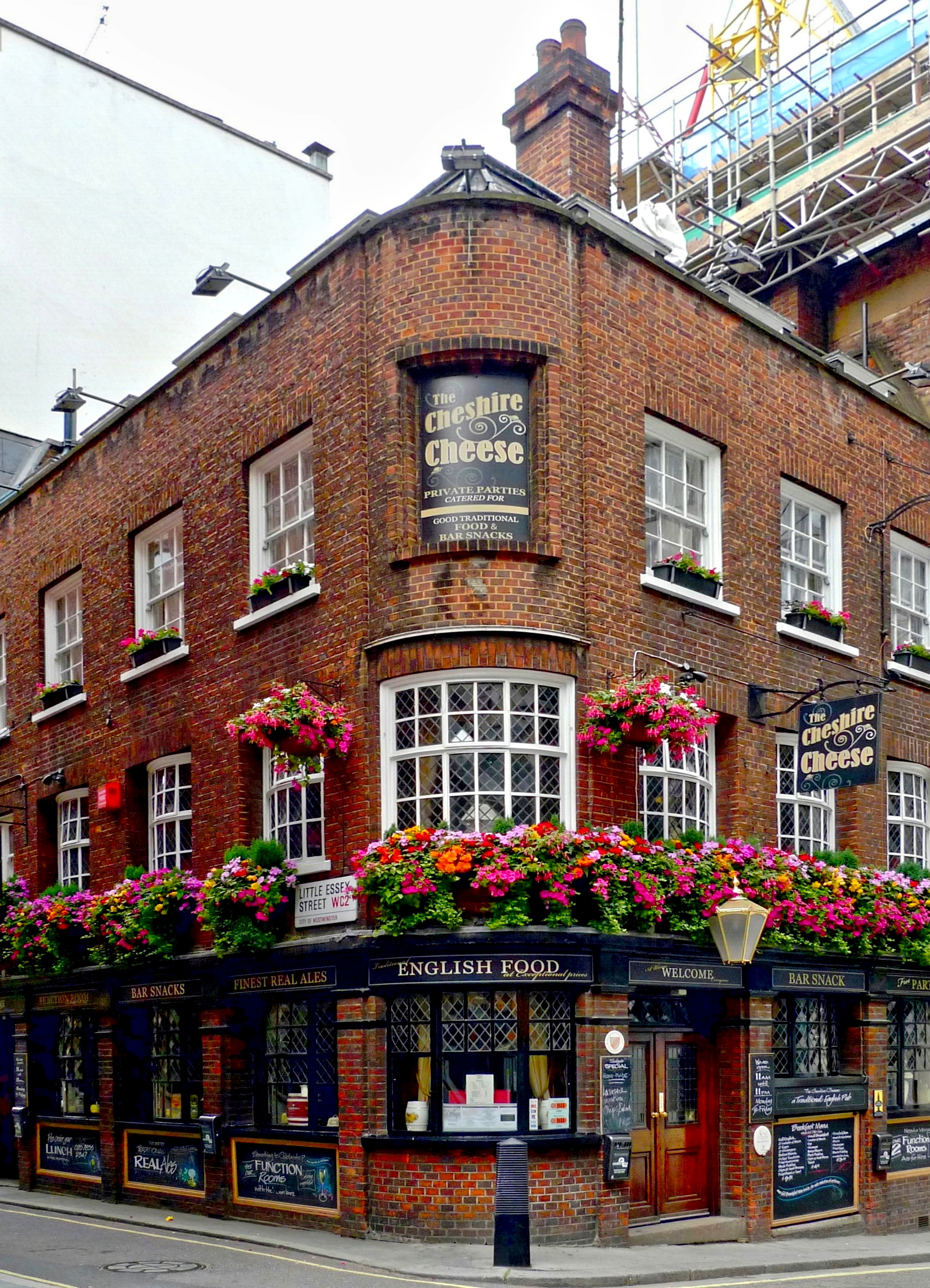
The Cheshire Cheese in Little Essex Street

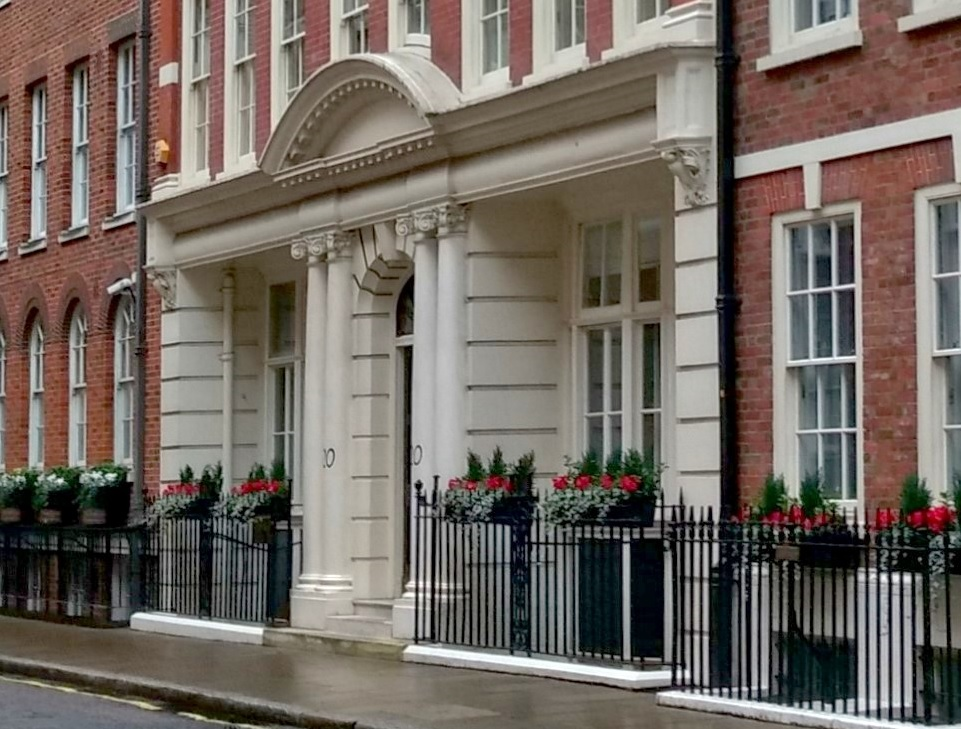
Nr. 20 Essex Street doubled as Bertram's Hotel in the 1987 Miss Marple episode "At Bertram's Hotel"

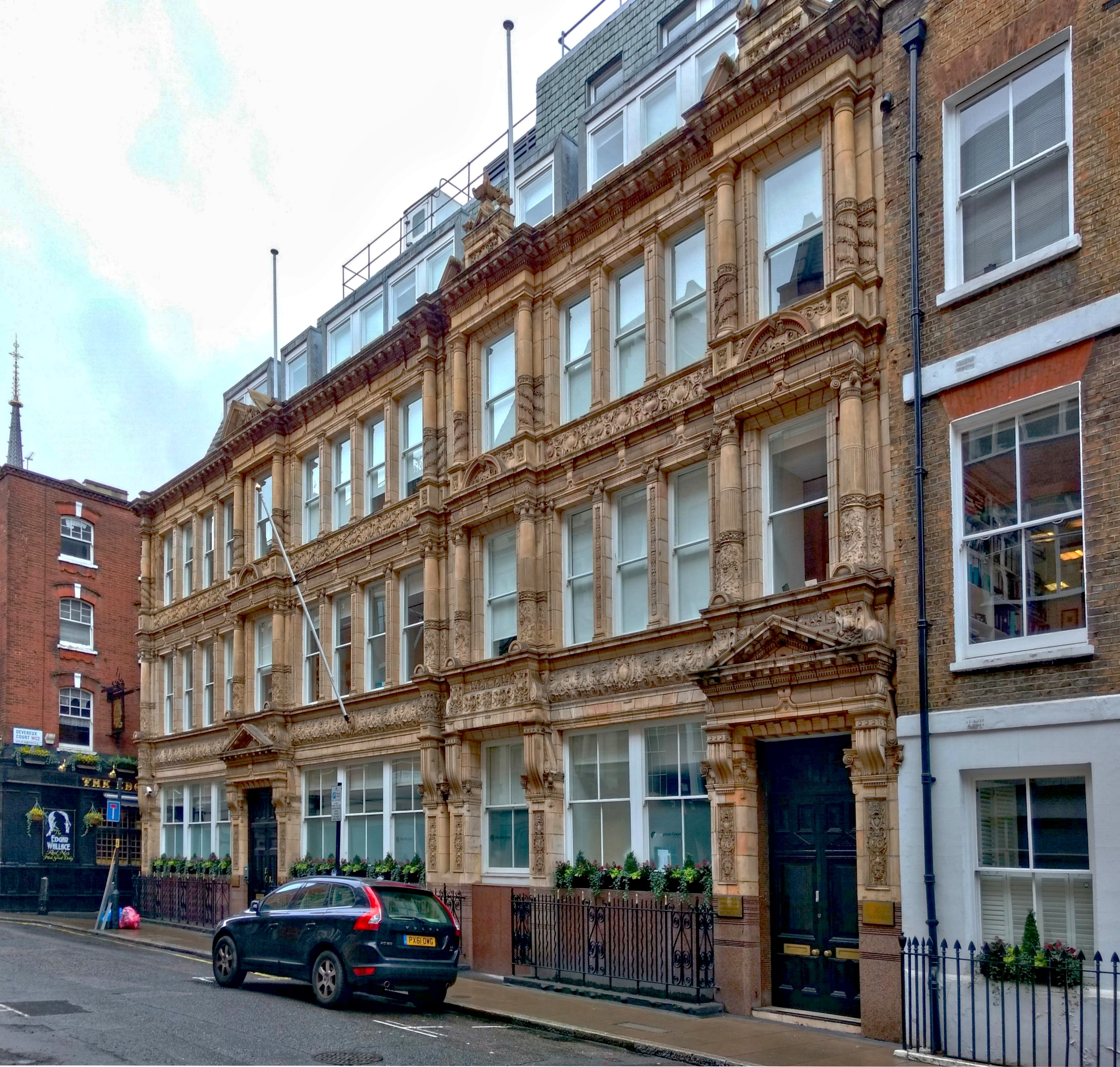
California House

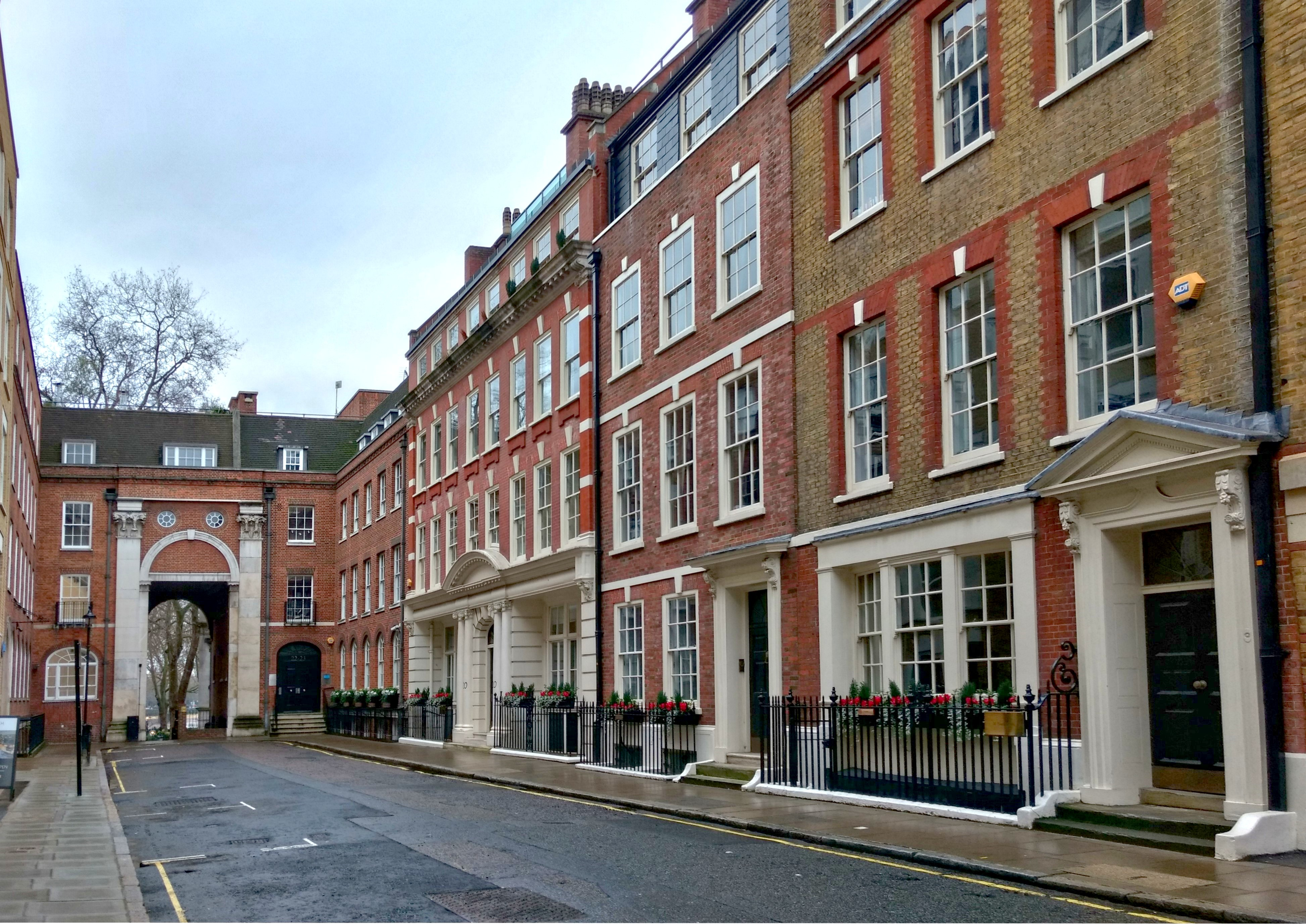
Essex Street south end with the water gate at the end

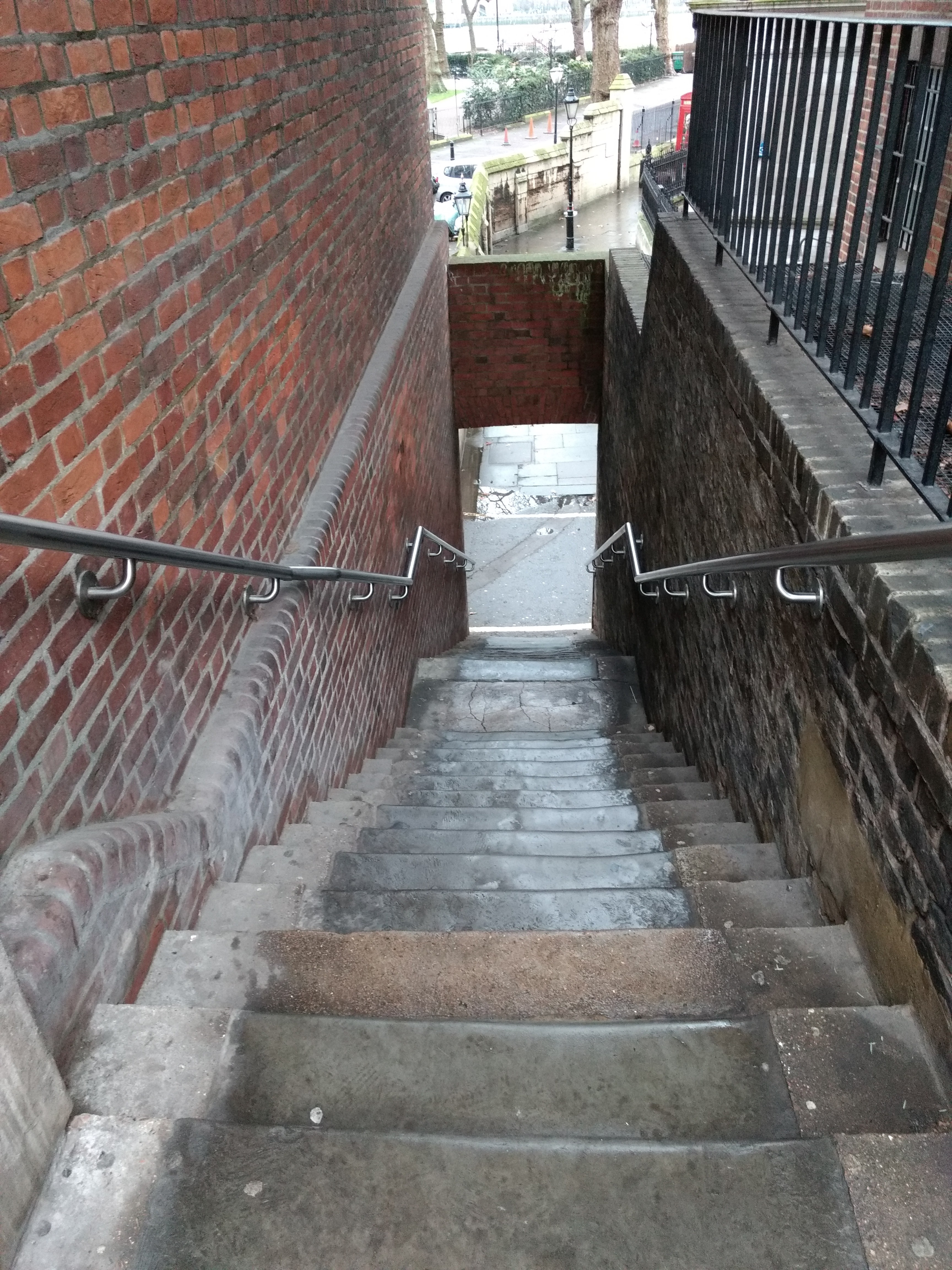
The Essex Street steps at the south end
