= Cheshire cheese (disambiguation) =

Cheshire cheese is a British variety of cheese.

Cheshire cheese may also refer to:

- Cheshire Mammoth Cheese, a giant cheese sent to Thomas Jefferson
- Ye Olde Cheshire Cheese, a pub in the City of London
- The Cheshire Cheese, a pub in the City of Westminster, London
