= 190 Strand =

Mixed-use building in London

Coordinates: 51.5125°N 0.1138°W

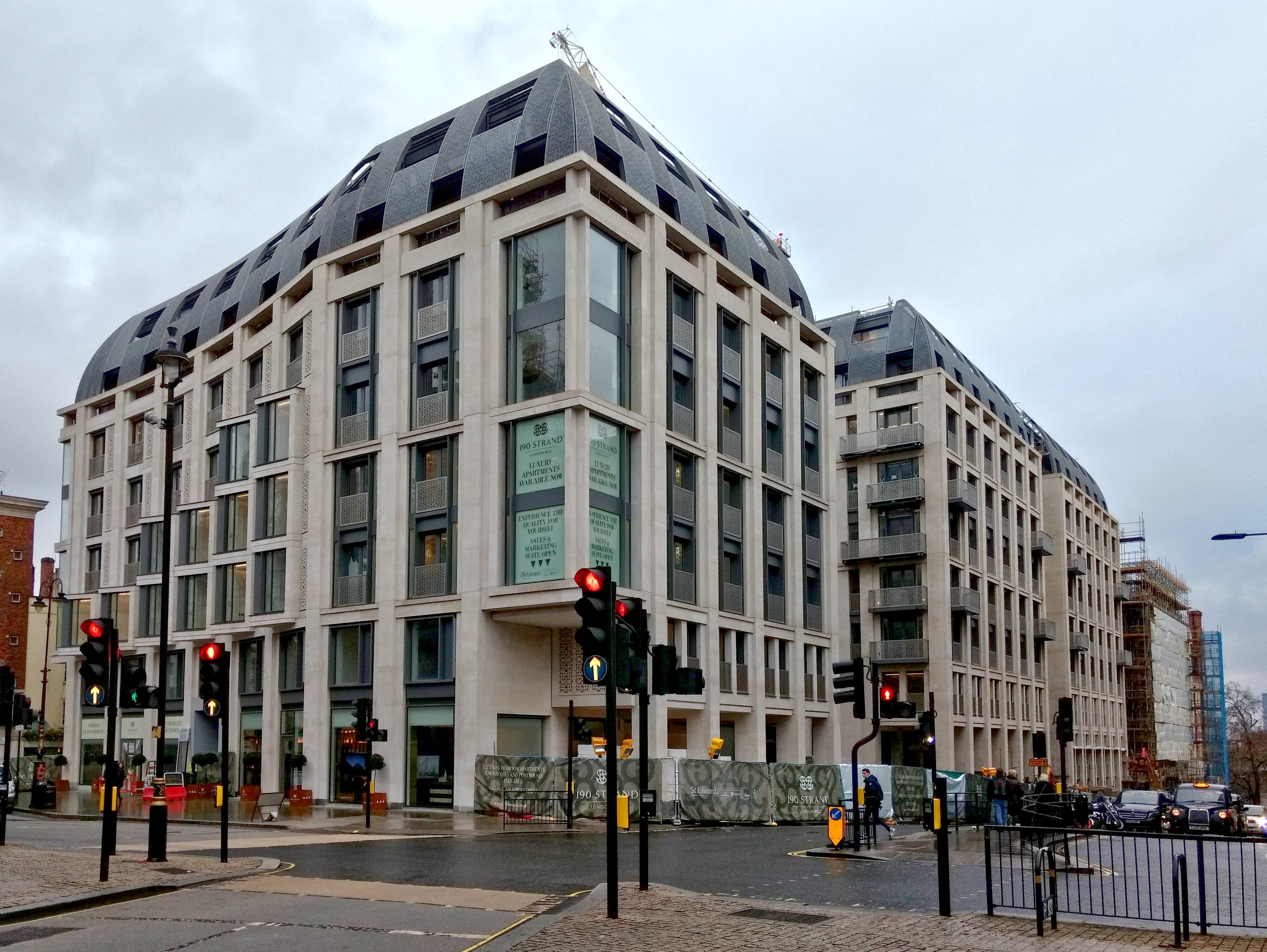
190 Strand from Strand

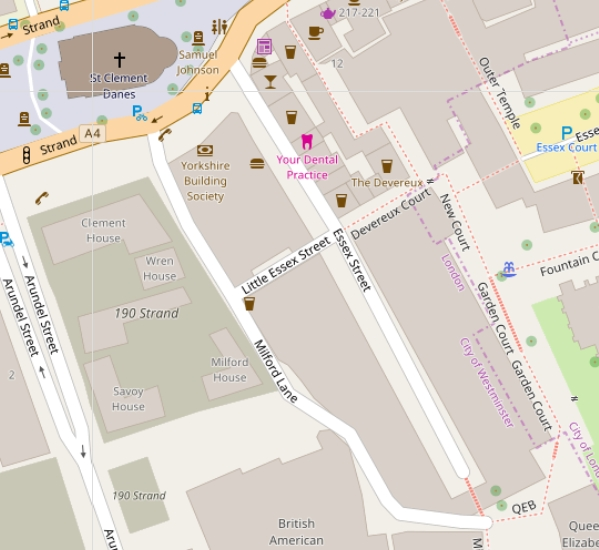
Location of 190 Strand

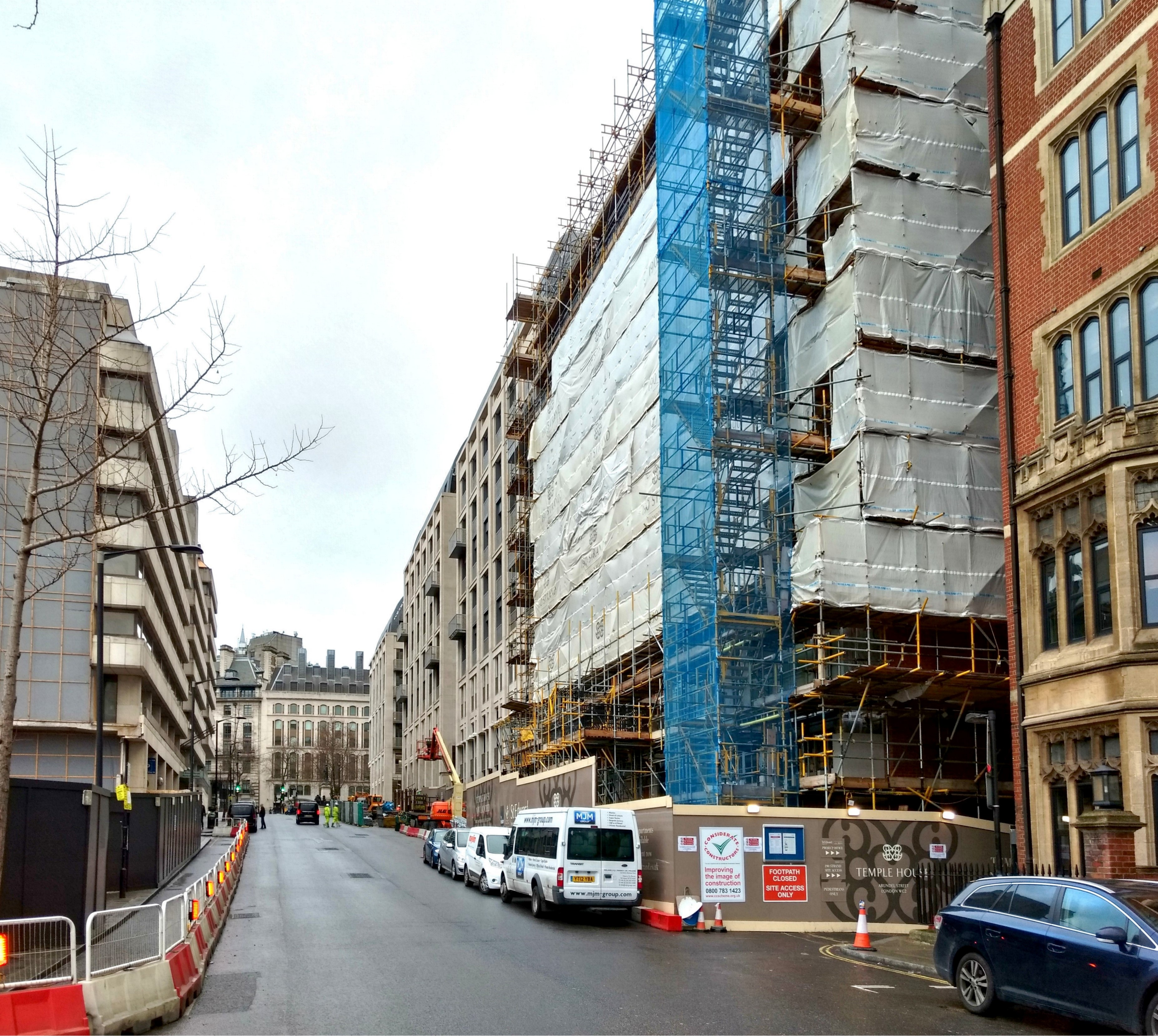
190 Strand (right) under construction from Arundel Street

190 Strand is a mixed-use building development by St Edward Homes, part of Berkeley Group Holdings, on the south side of Strand in the City of Westminster, London.

== Site ==
The development has six main buildings. The works are a mixture of structural and non-structural alterations to buildings prominent already by their height and modernity in this part of Westminster and complete demolition of certain existing edifices, their redesign and replacement.

The site measures approximately 0.5 hectares (1.2 acres) on the south side of Strand, facing St Clement Danes church, between Arundel Street and Milford Lane. Upon completion, the modern Maltravers Street, an east–west alley between Arundel Street and Milford Lane, ceased to exist as part of the approved plans, but Tweezer's Alley on the southern side has been enhanced. Immediately to the south of the site is Globe House, the headquarters of British American Tobacco.

Planning permission for the buildings was granted in 2011 to a design by GRID Architects.

== Building names ==
The principal buildings of the development have been named after local people and places. Clement House after nearby St Clement Danes church, Wren House after Sir Christopher Wren's rebuilding of St Clement Danes, Gladstone House after the statue of prime minister William Gladstone nearby on Strand, Milford House after Milford Lane, Savoy House after the Savoy Hotel, and Temple House after the Temple legal district.
