= Arundel Street =

Street in the City of Westminster, London

Coordinates: 51.5124°N 0.1142°W

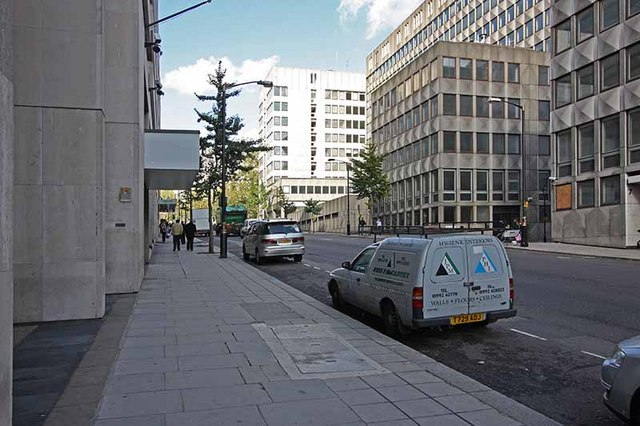
Arundel Street, looking towards Strand

Arundel Street is a street in the City of Westminster, London, that runs from Strand in the north to Temple Place in the south. It is on land once occupied by Arundel House and its gardens.

== Location ==
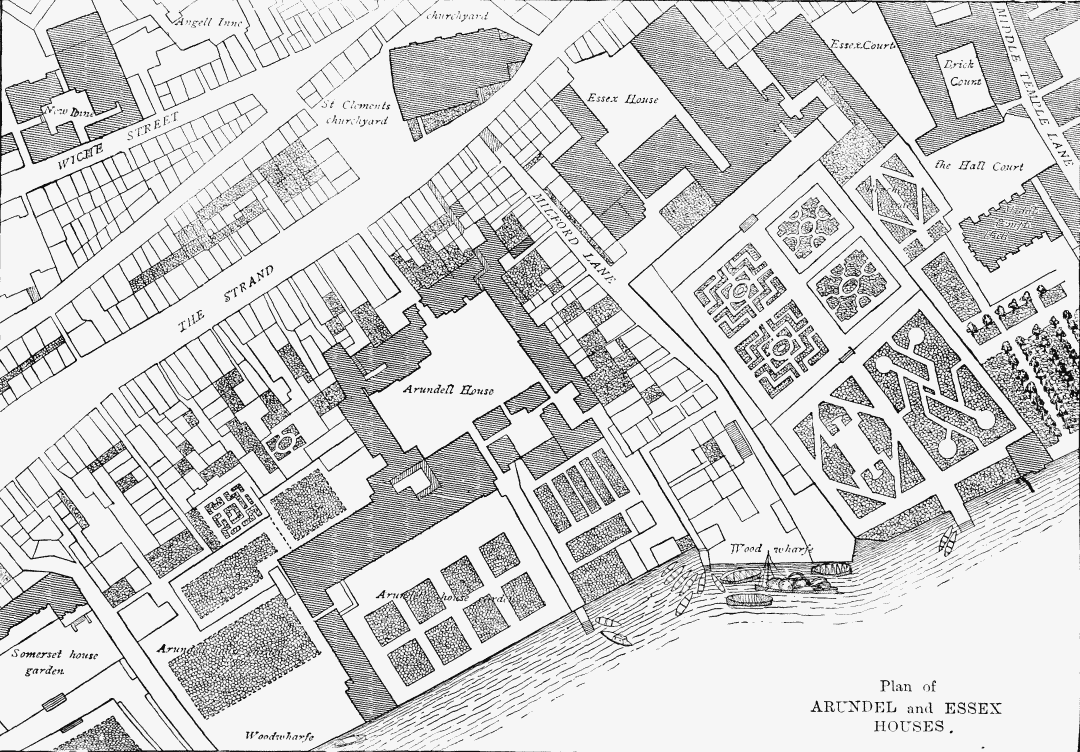
Map by Wenceslaus Hollar (c. 1670s) showing Arundel House.

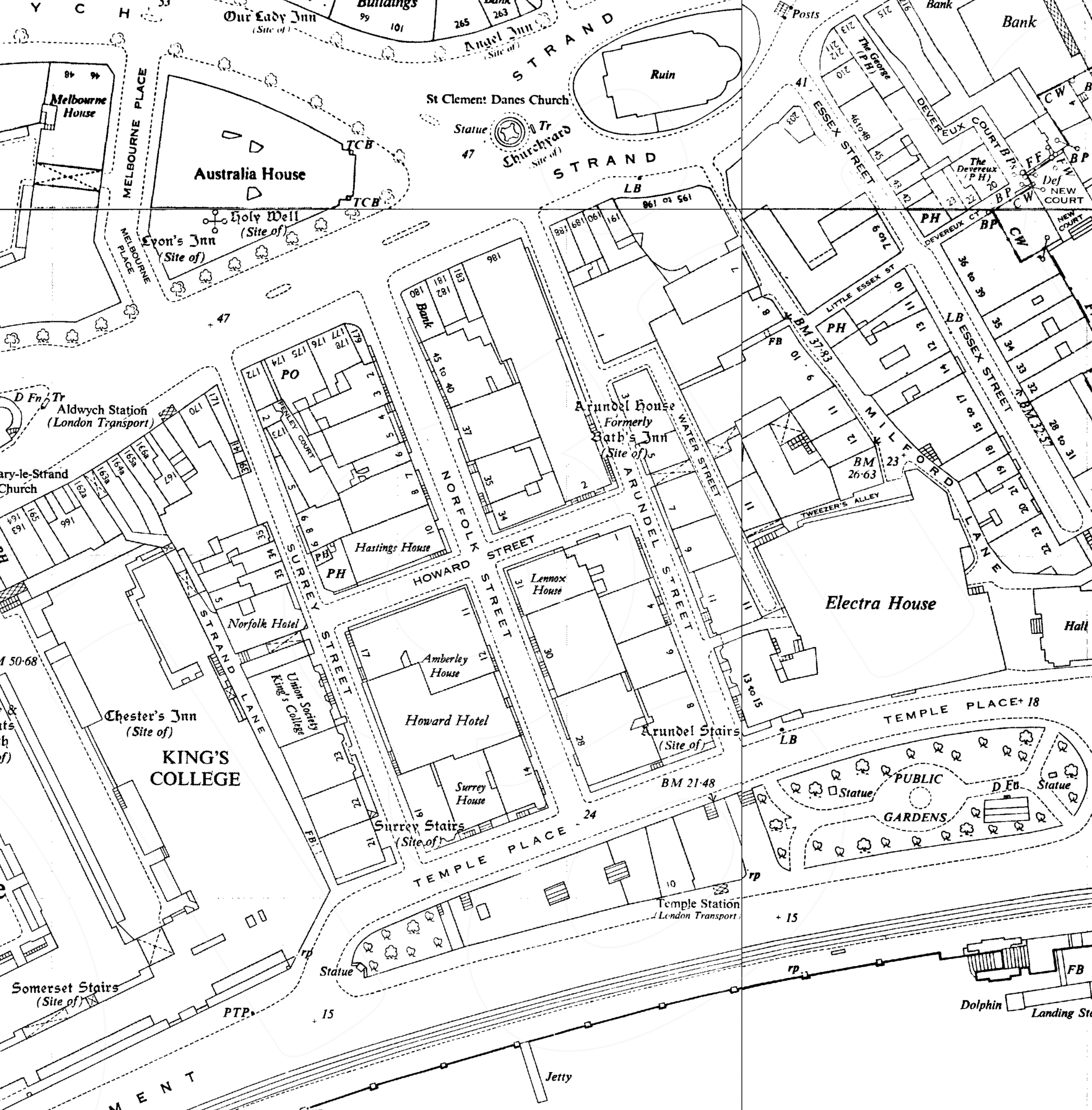
The vicinity of Arundel Street (centre) on a 1950s Ordnance Survey map.

Arundel street runs from Strand in the north to Temple Place in the south. Before the construction of the Victoria Embankment (1865–70) it ran as far as the north side of the River Thames. It is joined on its eastern side by Water Street and the modern Maltravers Street, which runs to Milford Lane in the east but was destroyed by the construction of 190 Strand. Howard Street once joined Arundel on the west but no longer exists.

== History ==
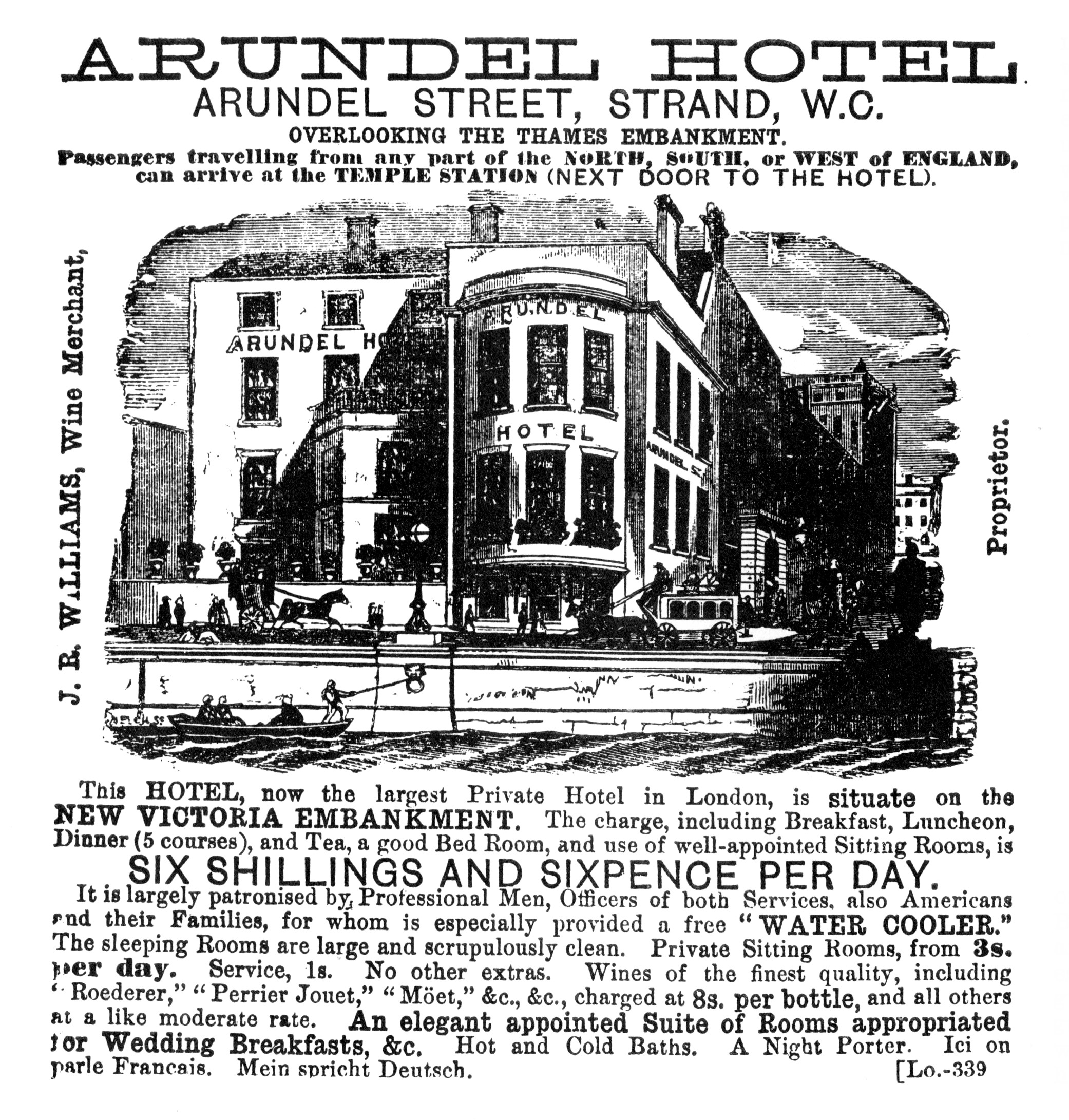
Arundel Hotel advertising, c. late 1800s.

The street is on land once occupied by Arundel House and its gardens, the property of the Howard family, Dukes of Norfolk. Arundel Street and its neighbouring streets, Howard, Norfolk, and Surrey, were all built after Arundel House was demolished by the earl of Arundel in 1678.

It is mentioned nostalgically in John Gay's Trivia (1716) as follows:

"Behold that narrow street which steep descends,
Whose buildings to the slimy shore extends;
Here Arundel's fam'd structure rear'd its frame,
The street alone retains the empty name"

The Whittington Club, formed 1847, stood on the east side at the north end on the corner with Water Street. It was designed to offer the advantages of an expensive west end club at lower cost to the middle classes and also offered educational classes.

The Arundel Hotel stood at the south end of the street on the western side at the end of the nineteenth century and start of the twentieth. It billed itself as "the largest private hotel in London", providing rooms to professional men, officers, and Americans and their families, "for whom is especially provided a free "water cooler". It was rebuilt in the late nineteenth century and the bay front that faced Victoria Embankment was replaced with a gothic design. The hotel existed until at least the mid-twentieth century.

== Buildings ==
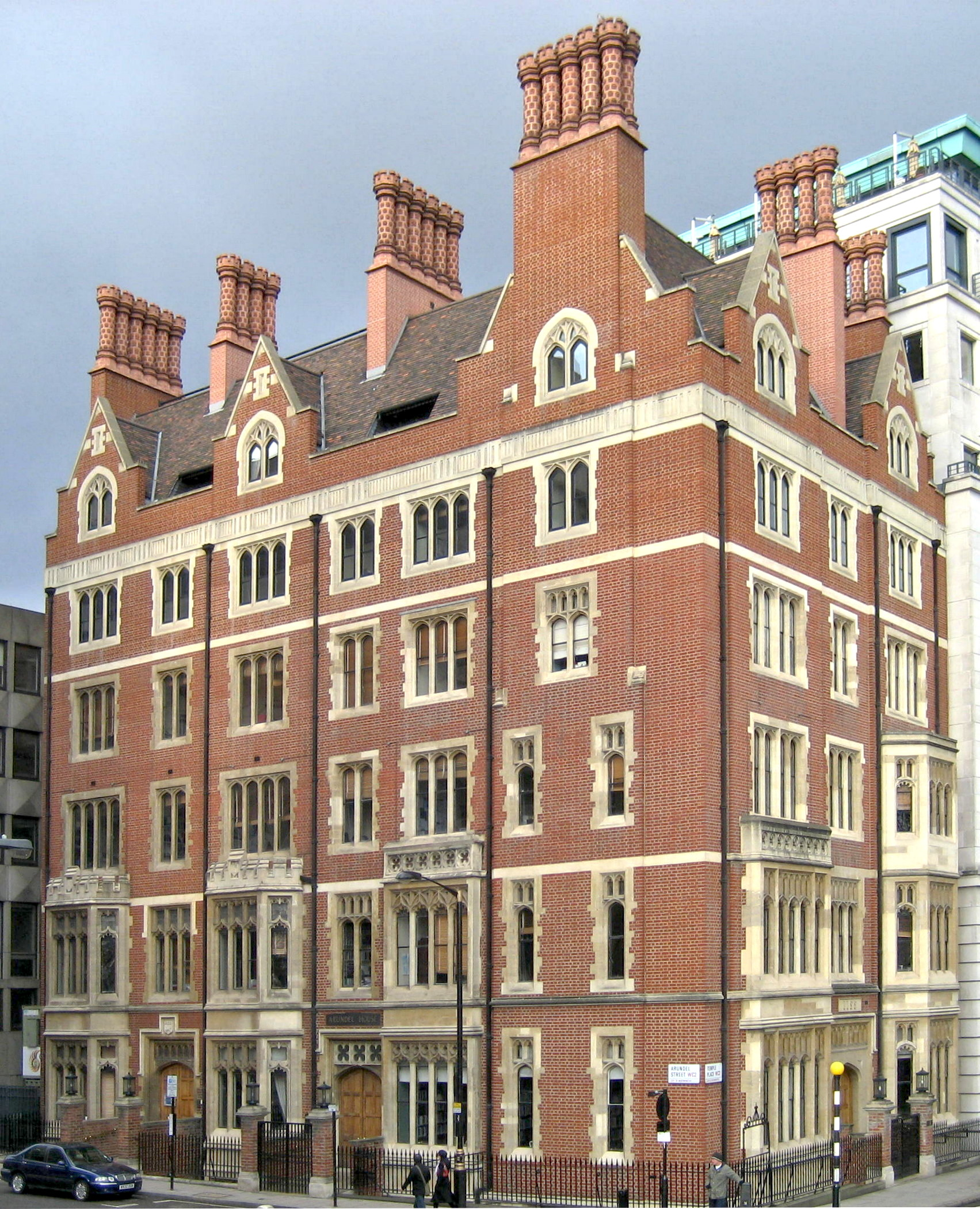
The modern Arundel House, home of the International Institute for Strategic Studies.

A large mixed-use development is underway on the eastern side of the street known as 190 Strand, as a result of which Maltravers Street will cease to exist.

At the south end on the corner with Temple Place is the modern Arundel House, home of the International Institute for Strategic Studies. The building is not on the site of the former Arundel House which was further north.

The western side of the street is taken up with office buildings and 190 Strand.

== Former inhabitants ==
Former inhabitants of Arundel Street include:

- John Anstis, Garter King at Arms.
- Eustace Budgell, writer for The Spectator and MP.
- George Darley
- Simon Harcourt, Queen Anne's Lord High Chancellor of Great Britain.
- Coventry Patmore, poet and author of The Angel in the House.
- John Howard Payne, composer of the song "Home! Sweet Home!"
- John Playford, publisher of The English Dancing Master (1651).
- Mrs Porter, tragic actress.
- Thomas Rymer, antiquarian, died at his home in the street in 1713 and was buried at nearby St Clement Danes.
