= Wilfred (Thames barge) =

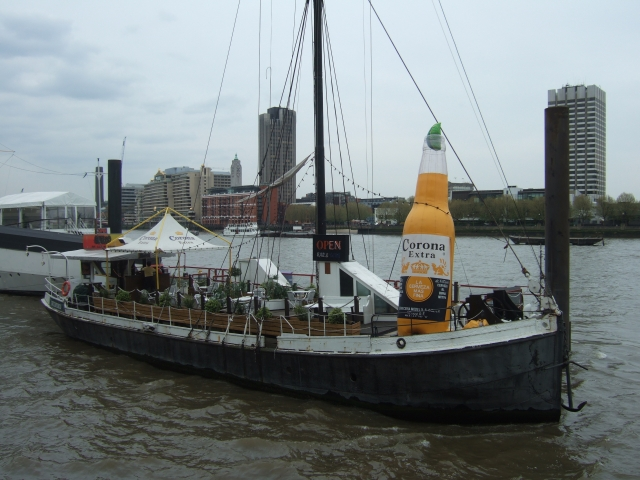
The Wilfred in 2010

Wilfred was a barge moored on the River Thames, London.

== History ==
Wilfred was built by J. Piper of East Greenwich in 1926. It was used as a cargo carrier until 1970, when she was sold into private ownership.

Until 2024, the boat was moored off Temple Pier on Victoria Embankment, London. The barge sank on 4 January 2024 during Storm Henk. It had been operating as a "floating bar" for 15 years. It was operated by Bar & Co. It was re-floated but had sustained severe damage. In February it was towed down stream to Erith for breaking up.
