= The Cheshire Cheese =

Listed pub in Temple, London, England

- The pub in 2025

General information
- Type: Public house
- Architectural style: Neo-Georgian
- Location: 5 Little Essex Street, Temple, London, England
- Coordinates: 51°30′45″N 0°06′48″W
- Year built: 1928; 98 years ago
- Client: Style & Winch Brewery
- Owner: ScottishPower UK PLC

Design and construction
- Architect: T. H. Nowell Parr
- Designations

Listed Building – Grade II
- Official name: Cheshire Cheese public house
- Designated: 24 December 2015
- Reference no.: 1431970

Website
- cheshirecheese.pub

The Cheshire Cheese is a Grade II listed public house on the corner of Little Essex Street and Milford Lane in Temple, London, England. A tavern has occupied the site since the 16th century, and a pub bearing that name has been recorded there since at least 1791. The present building was rebuilt or extensively remodelled in 1928 for Style & Winch Brewery to designs by T. H. Nowell Parr. The pub's interior is included on CAMRA's National Inventory of Historic Pub Interiors and is rated three stars for "outstanding national historic importance".

== History ==
There has been a tavern on this site since the 16th century, while a public house bearing the name Cheshire Cheese has been recorded here since at least 1791. It stands in London's Temple district, an area that developed around the Temple Church and has long been associated with the legal profession. References from the 16th, 18th and 19th centuries place the "Old Cheshire Cheese" at the junction of Little Essex Street and Milford Lane.

The present Cheshire Cheese was rebuilt or extensively remodelled in 1928 for Style & Winch Brewery to designs by T. H. Nowell Parr, an architect best known for his pubs and hotels in west London. Conceived as an "improved" public house, it formed part of an early 20th-century movement to create more spacious and comfortable premises, with facilities such as lounges and dining areas intended to appeal to a wider range of customers than the traditional pub.

The pub subsequently served as a meeting place for a range of professional, social and cultural organisations. The Elia Society, later known as the Charles Lamb Society, held its first meeting at the Cheshire Cheese on Fleet Street in 1924 and was meeting at the Little Essex Street premises during the 1930s. In the early 1990s, the Professional Contractors Group was established there and used the pub as a meeting place.

The pub is regarded by the Campaign for Real Ale (CAMRA) as having an interior of "outstanding national historic importance" and is rated three stars on its National Inventory of Historic Pub Interiors. On 24 December 2015, the Cheshire Cheese was designated a Grade II listed building.

In 2018, the pub's freehold was sold to a pension fund investor for £3.75 million after a lease had been agreed with Shepherd Neame. As of July 2026, CAMRA records the freehold owner as ScottishPower UK PLC.

== Architecture ==
=== Exterior ===
Built of London stock brick with timber windows and a slate-covered mansard roof, it extends over six levels, including a basement and cellar linked by a dumbwaiter and hoist system. Designed in a Neo-Georgian style, the building has a rounded corner, three principal storeys and an attic level within the roof. Separate entrances serve the main bar areas, while the upper floors were originally arranged for dining, accommodation and service use.

The elevations are arranged in four bays on Little Essex Street and three on Milford Lane, with projecting ground-floor windows, leaded glazing and timber entrance doors. One shortened window on the Milford Lane frontage reflects the former cellar access for deliveries. Brick pilasters divide the façades, while a recessed panel on the corner was intended to display the names of the pub and brewery. Above, the roof contains dormer windows, two brick chimney stacks and cast-iron brackets, one of which supports the pub sign.

=== Interior ===
The interior retains much of its 1928 character despite later alterations. At ground-floor level, the former saloon and public bar have been merged into a single space, although part of the original dividing screen survives. The room retains timber panelling, a decorative staircase screen with leaded glazing, a carved mirrored bar-back, exposed ceiling beams and a panelled hoist cover. The gents' toilets also retain their original urinals, although other fittings have been replaced.

The basement lounge and games room preserves similar features, including a bar, matching bar-back, timber panelling and beamed ceiling, despite some later additions. The staircase to the upper floors retains its original panelling and carved details, while the first-floor dining room continues to feature timber panelling, a fireplace surround and a beamed ceiling, although a bar and alterations to the toilets have been introduced. The former licensee's accommodation above remains largely unchanged in layout from the original 1928 design, aside from the enlargement of the top-floor kitchen into part of a former bedroom.
