= Outer Temple =

Coordinates: 51.5133°N 0.1126°W

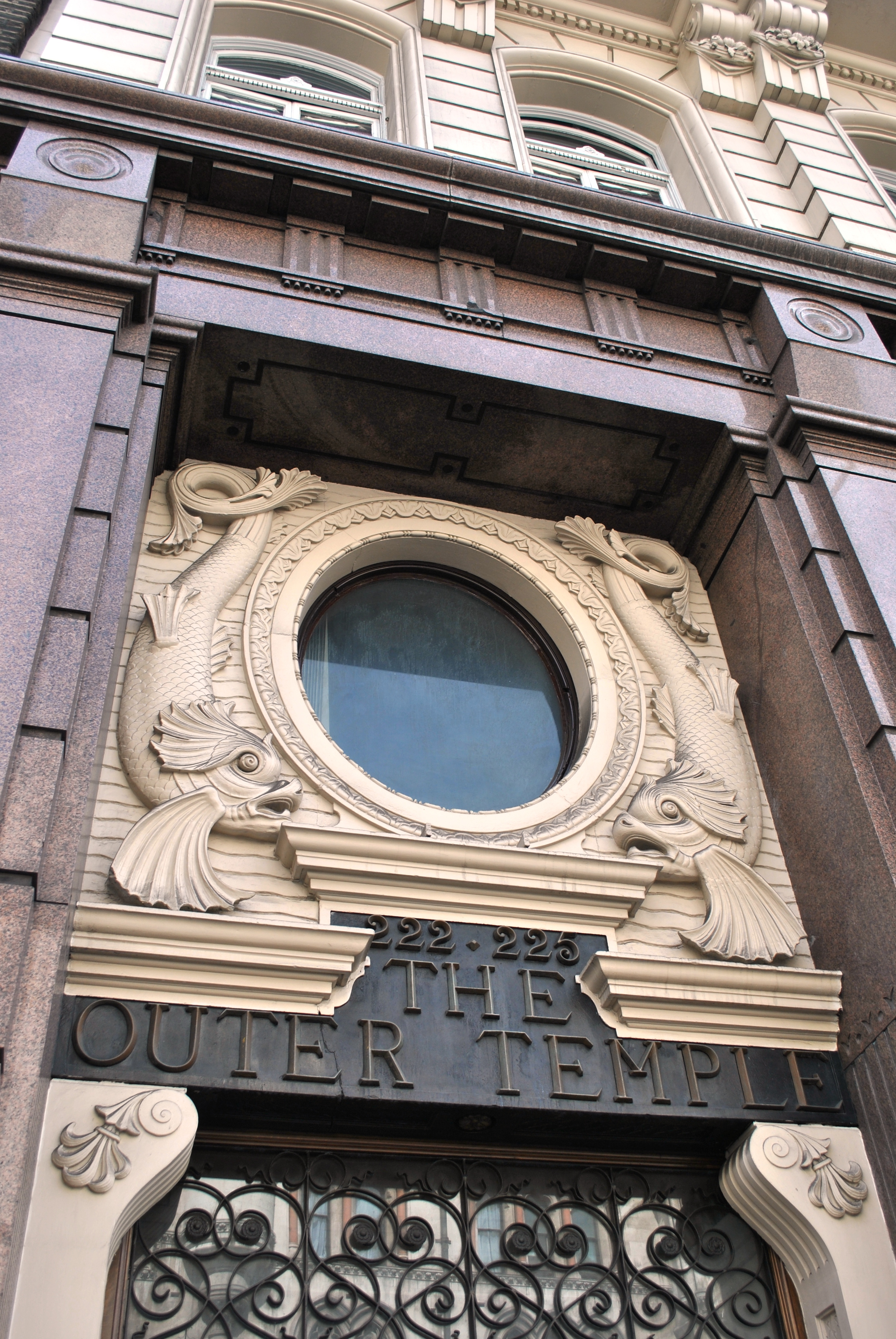
The Outer Temple, Fleet Street

The Outer Temple is a building next to the Temple area in London, just outside the City of London. In the 14th century, the property seized from the Knights Templar was divided, and that part of the Temple property then just outside London was given the name Outer Temple. It has been suggested that the name Outer Temple once also referred to an Inn of Chancery; its historical existence was first posited by A. W. B. Simpson and confirmed by John Baker in 2008. Little is known of it, other than that it lacked a hall; Baker suggests that this is the reason that it did not survive long enough to appear in many records. Other writers have insisted that it was never an inn: Sir George Buck wrote in 1612 "the Utter Temple neither is nor was ever any college or society of students". Regardless, although the present building takes the name, and is located in the area once known as outer-Temple, it is not otherwise historically connected.

== History ==
It is believed that the Inns of Chancery evolved in tandem with the Inns of Court. During the 12th and 13th century the law was taught in the City of London, primarily by the clergy. A papal bull in 1218 prohibited the clergy from practising in the secular, common law courts. As a result, law began to be practised and taught by laymen instead of by clerics. To protect their schools from competition, first Henry II and later Henry III issued proclamations prohibiting the teaching of the civil law within the City of London. The lawyers settled immediately outside the City of London as close as possible to Westminster Hall, where Magna Carta provided for a permanent court. This was the small village of Holborn, where they inhabited "hostels" or "inns", which later took their name from the landlord of the Inn in question.

Map of London about the 1300s. "Outer Temple" precinct shown at center left.

After the Temple was confiscated from the Knights Templar in 1312, King Edward II divided it between the Inner Temple and Outer Temple, being the parts of the Temple within and without the boundaries of the City of London. (The Inner Temple was in turn divided in two in 1337, the eastern part continuing to be called Inner Temple and the western part becoming known as Middle Temple. They were each leased to lawyers in 1346.)

== Controversy ==
While John Fortescue wrote of ten Inns of Chancery, each one attached to an Inn of Court "like Maids of Honour to a Princess", only nine were well known. The identification of the tenth as Outer Temple was first suggested by A. W. B. Simpson, who discovered a reference to a barrister named William Halle in the year books of the Serjeants-at-Law who was said to have come from the Outer Temple. At the time, Simpson debated whether it was a reference to a historical institution or simply a geographical address. In 2008 John Baker argued that it was most likely an institution with a discovery in the plea rolls of the Court of King's Bench of a barrister who claimed to be a "fellow of the [Outer] Temple". In 2013 John Baker discovered another member of the Outer Temple, Richard Palmer, who was sued in the Court of Common Pleas in 1523 and described as of the Exterior or Outer Temple, London.

However, this theory overlooks the existence of St George's Inn, a tenth inn of chancery which existed until the late 15th century, when it was abandoned. There is no evidence that Outer Temple was ever anything more than a barristers' chambers.

== Present-day chambers ==
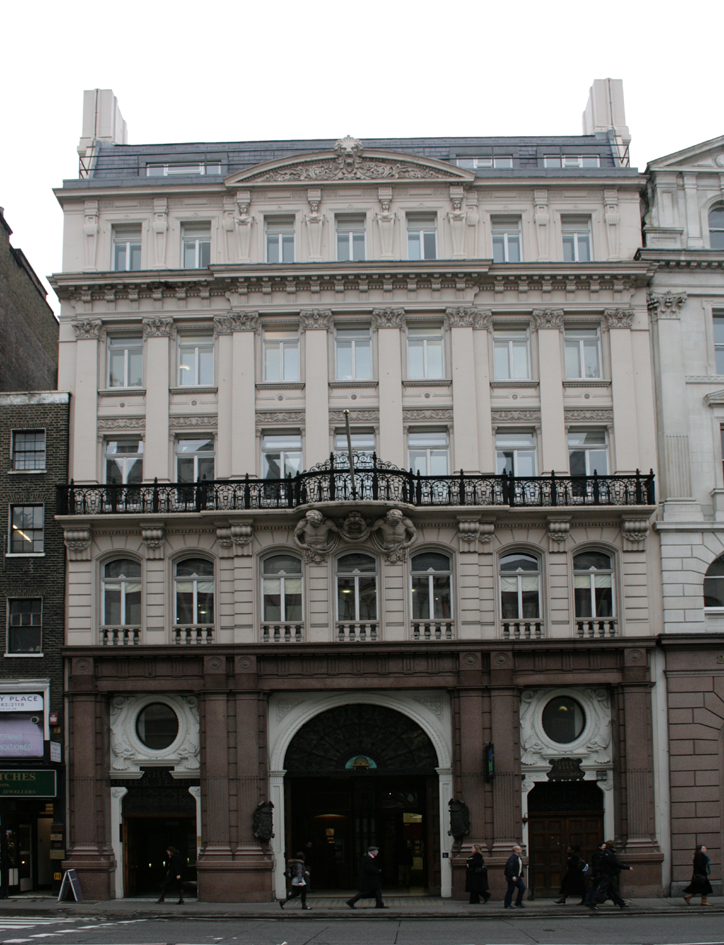
The Outer Temple building at 222 Strand - a passage through to Middle Temple leads from the left entrance

There is a 19th-century building called "The Outer Temple", situated between Strand and Essex Court/Brick Court (of the Middle Temple), just outside the Middle Temple boundary in the City of Westminster, and directly opposite the Royal Courts of Justice. It is occupied by a set of barristers' chambers named Outer Temple Chambers (as well as a branch of a retail bank) but is not directly related to the historic Outer Temple.

== In fiction ==
Horace Rumpole, the fictional barrister creation of John Mortimer, QC, claims to have eaten his dinners at the Outer Temple (which would make it an Inn of Court); Mortimer trained at the Inner Temple.

== Bibliography ==
- Baker, John (2008). "The Inn of the Outer Temple". Law Quarterly Review (124). Sweet & Maxwell. ISSN 0023-933X.
- Baker, John (2013). Collected Papers on English Legal History. Cambridge University Press. ISBN 9781107020436.
- Bellot, Hugh (1902). The Inner and Middle Temple. London: Methuen & Co.
- Loftie, W J (1895). The Inns of Court and Chancery. New York: Macmillan & Co. OCLC 592845.
- Watt, Francis; Dunbar Plunket Barton; Charles Benham (1928). The Story of the Inns of Court. Boston: Houghton Mifflin. OCLC 77565485.
