= Temple, London =

One of the main legal districts in London, England

Coordinates: 51.512°N 0.111°W

Temple
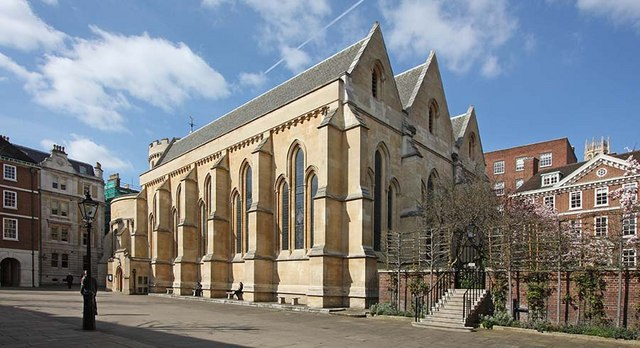
- Temple Church

- Location within Greater London
- Sui generis: City of London
- Administrative area: Greater London
- Region: London
- Country: England
- Sovereign state: United Kingdom
- Post town: LONDON
- Postcode district: EC4
- Postcode district: WC2
- Dialling code: 020
- Police: City of London
- Fire: London
- Ambulance: London
- UK Parliament: Cities of London and Westminster
- London Assembly: City and East

The Temple is an area or precinct of the City of London surrounding Temple Church. It is one of the main legal districts in London and a notable centre for English law, from the Middle Ages to the present day. It consists of the Inner Temple and the Middle Temple, which are two of the four Inns of Court and act as local authorities in place of the City of London Corporation as to almost all structures and functions. Before the establishment of these Inns of Court, the Temple area was the precinct given to the Knights Templar (who built the church) until they were suppressed in 1312, but the area has retained the name from that time. It became a centre of the legal profession soon afterwards.

The Royal Courts of Justice and Temple Bar are just to the north and Temple tube station borders to the southwest in the City of Westminster. The precinct is roughly bounded by the River Thames (the Victoria Embankment) to the south, Surrey Street to the west, the Strand and Fleet Street to the north and Carmelite Street and Whitefriars Street to the east. The intervening Essex Street, two streets east of Surrey Street, is the traditional western boundary, beyond which are affluent office/hotel and residential blocks, spread over large three street blocks that are closest to the station.

== Extent ==
Temple, formally defined, contains many barristers' chambers and solicitors' offices, as well as some notable legal institutions such as the Employment Appeal Tribunal.

Outside the jurisdiction but facing Temple tube station – in more dated use considered the Savoy and alternatively Strand or Saint Clement Danes districts – are several buildings. These include the mid-rise Arundel House that hosts the International Institute for Strategic Studies and a large multi-use site, in construction, otherwise facing the Strand, Arundel and Surrey Streets.

== Toponymy ==
Map of London in about 1300, showing several large monastic holdings in purple. The Temple is the purple precinct furthest centre-left

The name is recorded in the 12th century as Novum Templum, meaning 'New Temple'. It is named after the then 'new' church (Temple Church) and surrounding holdings once belonging to the Knights Templar. The 'Old Temple' was located in Holborn, roughly where Lincoln's Inn now stands. In addition to the church, Temple now appears in the names of Inner Temple, Middle Temple, the Temple Bar, and the nearby Temple tube station. After the Knights were suppressed in 1312, their estate, the precinct of The Temple, was first divided into Inner Temple and Outer Temple (denoting what was within the City of London and what was without). While Inner Temple was later divided into Inner and Middle, Outer Temple generally fell into disuse.

== History ==
The Temple was originally the precinct of the Knights Templar who constructed the Temple Church in honour of Solomon's Temple in Jerusalem. The Knights had two halls, whose modern successors are the Middle Temple Hall and the Inner Temple Hall. However, only the Inner Temple Hall preserves elements of the medieval hall on the site (specifically, the medieval buttery).

Upon the dissolution of the Knights Templar in 1312, Pope Clement V granted their possessions to the Knights Hospitaller. King Edward II (r. 1307–1327) ignored the claims of the Knights Hospitaller and divided the Temple into the Inner Temple and the Outer Temple, being the parts of the Temple within and without the boundaries of the City of London respectively. Not until 1324, after the prior, Thomas L'Archer, paid a substantial bribe, was the claim of the Knights Hospitaller to the Inner Temple officially recognised in England, but even then Edward II still bestowed it on his favourite, Hugh le Despencer, in spite of the Knights' rights. Upon Hugh's death in 1326, the Inner Temple passed first to the mayor of London and then in 1333 to one William de Langford, the King's clerk, for a ten-year lease.

In 1337, the Knights petitioned Edward III to rectify the grant of consecrated land to a layman. As a result, the Inner Temple was divided between the consecrated land to the east and the unconsecrated land in the west, the eastern part continuing to be called Inner Temple and the western part becoming known as Middle Temple. Langford continued to hold Middle Temple at a reduced rent. In 1346, Langford's lease having expired, the Knights Hospitaller leased both Middle and Inner Temples to lawyers from St George's Inn and Thavie's Inn respectively. However, lawyers had already occupied the Temple since 1320, when it belonged to the Earl of Lancaster.

After Henry VIII dissolved the Knights Hospitaller in the course of the English Reformation, the barristers remained as tenants of the Crown, for an annual rent of £10 for each society (of Inner and Middle Temple). Their current tenure dates from a charter granted to them by James I in 1608. Originally a grant of fee farm, the reversion was purchased from Charles II, finally giving the lawyers absolute title. In 2008, the 400th anniversary of the charter of James I was celebrated by Elizabeth II issuing new letters patent confirming the original grant.

The Outer Temple area was granted to the Bishop of Exeter, and eventually purchased by the Earl of Essex, Robert Devereux, who gave his name to Essex Street and Devereux Court, as well as Essex Court in Middle Temple.

The area of the Temple was increased when the River Thames was embanked by the Victoria Embankment, releasing land to the south which previously lay within the tidal range of the river. The original bank of the river can clearly be seen in a drop in ground level, for example in the Inner Temple Gardens or the stairs at the bottom of Essex Street.

The area suffered much damage due to enemy air raids in World War II. Many of the buildings, especially in the Inner Temple and Middle Temple inns, had to be rebuilt. Temple Church itself was badly damaged and also had to be rebuilt. Nonetheless, the Temple is rich with Grade I listed buildings.

== Inner Temple and Middle Temple ==
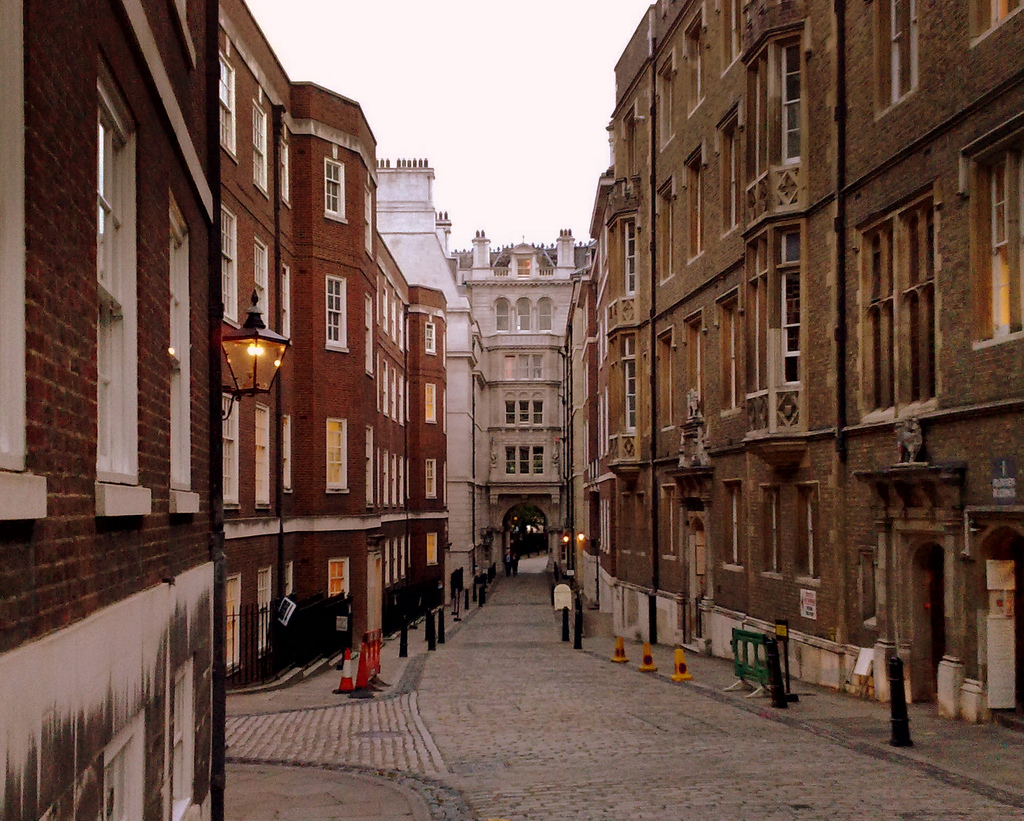
Looking down Middle Temple Lane. The buildings are occupied by barristers' chambers.

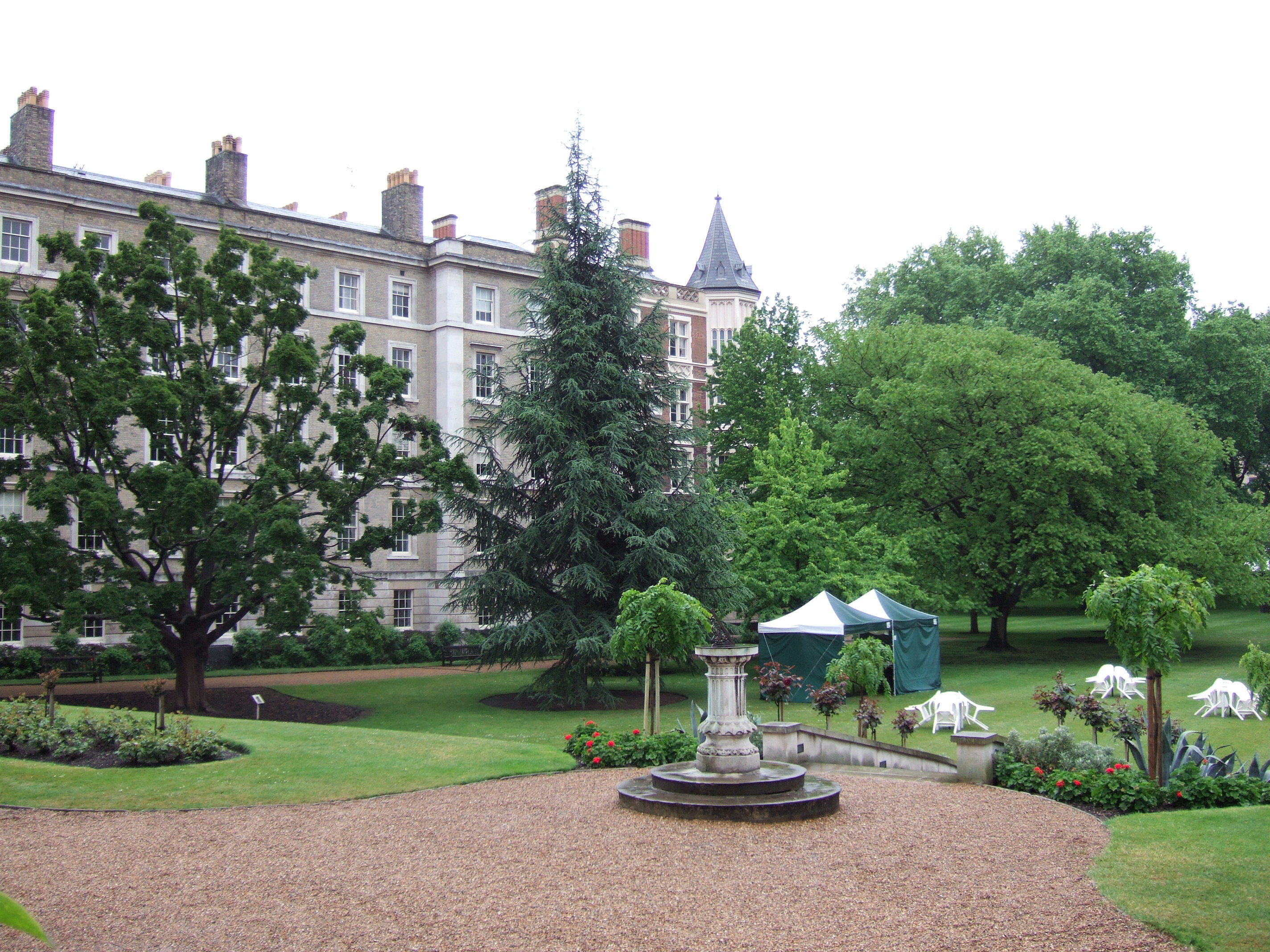
Part of the Inner Temple Garden and buildings

The core of the district lies in the City of London and consists of two Inns of Court: Inner Temple (eastern part) and Middle Temple (western part). The Temple Church is roughly central to these two inns and is governed by both of them.

The Inns have their own gardens, dining halls, libraries and administrative offices, all located in their part of the Temple. Most of the land is, however, taken up by buildings in which barristers practise from sets of rooms known as chambers. There are some enclaves and exclaves in the boundary between the two Inns.

There was a long-running dispute between the two inns concerning which one was older and which ought to have precedence over the other accordingly. This was resolved in 1620 when a tribunal of four judges declared that all four inns should be equal, "no one having right to precedence before the other".

Until the 20th century, many of the chambers in the Temple were also residential accommodation for barristers. However, shortage of space for professional purposes gradually limited the number of residential sets to the very top floors, which are largely occupied by senior barristers and judges, many of whom use them as pieds-à-terre, having their family home outside London. There are also a limited number of rooms reserved for new barristers undertaking the Bar Professional Training Course. This, coupled with a general move of population out of the City of London, has made the Temple much quieter outside working hours than it appears, for example, in the novels of Charles Dickens, which frequently allude to the Temple. Today, approximately a quarter of the chambers buildings in the Inner Temple and Middle Temple include residential accommodation, and current planning policy is to retain this where possible, to retain the special "collegiate" character of the Temple Inns of Court.

There is also a 19th-century building called "The Outer Temple", situated between Essex Court and Strand, just outside the Middle Temple boundary in the City of Westminster, but this is not part of the modern Inns of Court, has commercial landowners and is not directly related to the historic and long-defunct Outer Temple inn.

An area known as Serjeant's Inn was formerly outside the Temple, although at one time also occupied by lawyers (the Serjeants-at-Law). In 2001, it was acquired by the Inner Temple (it is adjacent and connected to King's Bench Walk in the Inner Temple) with a view to converting it into barristers' chambers. However, it was instead converted into a hotel.

=== Liberty ===
Inner Temple and Middle Temple are two of the few remaining liberties, an old name for a geographical administrative division. They are independent extra-parochial areas, historically not governed by the City of London Corporation and are equally outside the ecclesiastical jurisdiction of the Bishop of London. They are today regarded as local authorities for most purposes, but can delegate functions to the Common Council of the City of London, as provided in the Temples Order 1971. They geographically fall within the boundaries and liberties of the City of London, but can be thought of as independent enclaves. They are both part of the City ward of Farringdon Without. The Parliamentary Boundaries Act 1832 included The Temple within City of London parliamentary constituency. This change is among those which ended malapportionment and one voter voting in multiple parliamentary constituencies in England and Wales.

The southern boundary of the Temple liberties was the natural bank of the Thames until the Victoria Embankment was constructed (1865–1870). The boundary is virtually unchanged – despite this notable engineering work, which meant that the Inner and Middle Temple lost their frontage to the Thames, albeit replaced widely with gardens. Both now own associated, law-related properties, just beyond the boundary. The Embankment – a major thoroughfare with an Underground line running beneath – is on paper never part of Temple – the cusp is where the gardens meet the road, where the spring tide (rarely flooded) part of the bank stood. The City of London's comparable limit is the centre of the Thames.

== Temple Church ==
The Temple Church is a royal peculiar. It was built by the Knights Templar and consecrated in 1185. It is jointly owned by the Middle Temple and Inner Temple inns.

== Temple tube station and pier ==
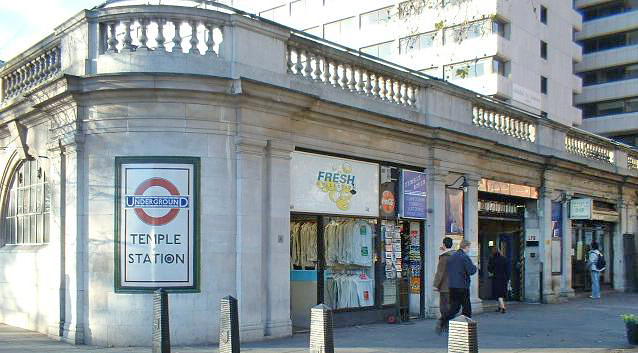
Temple tube station

Temple gives its name to Temple tube station, served by the District and Circle lines, which is immediately southwest, between Temple Place and the Victoria Embankment. There is also a Temple Pier on the Victoria Embankment, near the Tube station immediately west of the Westminster-City of London boundary; HMS Wellington is permanently moored there. The Wilfred barge was moored here until its sinking during Storm Henk in January 2024.

== See also ==
- Temple Bar, London
- Inner Temple Library
- Gray's Inn
- Lincoln's Inn
- English law

General:

- History of London
